= Bonlieu (disambiguation) =

Bonlieu is a commune in eastern France.

Bonlieu may also refer to:

- Bonlieu-sur-Roubion, commune in southeastern France
- Edith Bonlieu (1934–1995), French alpine skier
- François Bonlieu (1937–1973), French alpine skier
