= Edith Bonlieu =

French alpine skier (1934–1995)

- Undated photo of Bonlieu

Personal information
- Full name: Marie Édith Jeanne Vuarnet
- Born: 18 April 1934 Paron, France
- Died: 16 December 1995 (aged 61) near Saint-Pierre-de-Chérennes, Isère, France
- Spouse: Jean Vuarnet
- Children: 3
- Relative: François Bonlieu (brother)

Sport
- Sport: Alpine skiing

Marie Édith Jeanne Vuarnet (née Bonlieu, 18 April 1934 – 16 December 1995) was a French alpine skier. She competed in the women's downhill at the 1956 Winter Olympics, and was a three time champion in the French downhill competition. She was a member of the Order of the Solar Temple and died in a mass murder-suicide on 16 December 1995, alongside other members including her youngest son, Patrick.

== Biography ==
=== Early life and career ===
Marie Édith Jeanne Vuarnet was born 18 April 1934, in Paron, France. She came from a skiing family. She never knew her father, and had four siblings from three different fathers. Her brother was the more successful alpine skier and Olympic gold medalist François Bonlieu. She was a three time champion in the French downhill skiing competition, in 1955, 1958, and 1960.

She came second in the 1955 Zermatt downhill, losing to Luise Jaretz of Austria, five seconds slower. She competed in the women's downhill at the 1956 Winter Olympics. That year, she took first place in the Émile Allais Cup downhill race; the male first place winner was Jean Vuarnet. Two years later she and Vuarnet, then a triple French champion, married on 15 November 1958. He won the Olympic downhill gold medal, while a leg injury prevented Edith from competing in the same Olympics. They had three sons, Alain, Pierre, and Patrick, born in 1962, 1963 and 1969, respectively. Her brother François Bonlieu was murdered in 1973.

=== Solar Temple membership ===
She was a member of the notorious Order of the Solar Temple (OTS) group. She had joined the group in 1990, after being invited by another member to see leader Luc Jouret in a conference on healthy living. Edith, passionate about the environment, was appealed to by Jouret's message. Jouret encouraged her beliefs in ecology and spiritualism. She later brought her son Patrick, who she was very close to, into the OTS. She and Jean Vuarnet had been going through marital struggles at the time, to which Alain attributed her odd behavior. She grew depressed, with Vuarnet focusing on his business and her children having left home. Patrick was said to have had trouble living up to his very successful father and desired recognition which the OTS gave him. According to a later testimony from Alain, recalling her behavior, she repeated every gesture seven times, would wash the handles of doors in alcohol, and leave during dinner to see "friends". Patrick became evasive and would not communicate. She would also have to "observe" the "energies" of anyone before shaking their hands. Trying to understand her odd behavior, Alain once asked her if she was having an affair.

The group committed several acts of mass-murder suicide (a "transit", in the group's terminology) in 1994, leading to the deaths of 53 people and widespread notoriety. Their family had not known of any connection to the group prior to the mass suicides, when the names of both Edith and Patrick were mentioned in a police report; they were told of this when a journalist from L'Express showed up at their house. Patrick Vuarnet had been the person to distribute the letters declaring the 1994 suicides, after which he was questioned but not charged with any crime; he expressed to his brother that he felt guilty that he had not been in the first "transit", and that his brother "didn't understand". Upon learning of their involvement in the OTS, Jean Vuarnet was enraged.

=== Death ===
As both leaders Luc Jouret and Joseph Di Mambro had died in these suicides, the family was in some way relieved. After the suicides, Alain recalled asking Edith if she still talked to other members, to which she said she did not; however, this was a lie, both her and her son continued to secretly be members of a continuation of the OTS. They both died in a mass murder-suicide near Saint-Pierre-de-Chérennes in the Vercors in France on 16 December 1995, alongside other OTS members; the group believed that they would be "transiting" to the star Sirius. Their bodies were immolated in a star shape in a place named the Hellhole. They took sedatives and then were shot by two other members of the group. It is contested as to whether all the members of the group, including Edith, consented to death in this second transit. She died aged 61.

The bodies were discovered on the 23rd. Following her death, Jean Vuarnet wrote a book about the case, Ils ont tué ma femme et mon fils, lit. 'They killed my wife and son', telling of her behavior prior to the deaths. The Vuarnet family dispute that it was a mass suicide, proposing instead that they were murdered by outside forces.
