= 1995 Vercors massacre =

Religious mass murder-suicide

- Location: 45.0945°N 5.5000°E; Well of Hell, near Saint-Pierre-de-Chérennes, Isère, France
- Date: 16 December 1995
- Attack type: Mass shooting, mass murder-suicide
- Weapons: Two .22 LR rifles; Two .357 Magnum revolvers; Gasoline
- Deaths: 16 (including the perpetrators)
- Perpetrators: Orchestrator; Christiane Bonet; Shooters: Jean-Pierre Lardanchet; André Friedli
- Motive: Theological concept of "transit" to Sirius
- Judge: Luc Fontaine

On the morning of 16 December 1995, 16 members of the Order of the Solar Temple died in a mass murder-suicide in a clearing in the Vercors, near the village of Saint-Pierre-de-Chérennes in Isère, France. Two members of the group, Jean-Pierre Lardanchet and André Friedli, shot and killed 14 other members, including three children, before setting the bodies on fire and killing themselves. This was done in order to facilitate a spiritual voyage to the star Sirius, a "transit", as it had been in previous mass suicides.

This was the second mass murder-suicide associated with the group, following the 1994 mass murder-suicide, which had killed 53 members of the group, including both of its leaders, Joseph Di Mambro and Luc Jouret. Following this initial spate of deaths, the OTS was believed to be defunct, but was actually secretly continued by Christiane Bonet, a devoted member of the group. Bonet claimed that she could communicate with Jouret and Di Mambro in the afterlife as a medium, and gathered together the remaining OTS members, who would regularly meet together. In accordance with the previous writings of the OTS, she soon began to orchestrate a second "transit".

On 15 December 1995, the members all received a call from Bonet, after which they abruptly left their jobs and families and drove to an isolated clearing in the Vercors called the Well of Hell. According to the standard hypothesis, the members were then drugged, before Jean-Pierre Lardanchet and André Friedli shot and killed them, including in Lardanchet's case his own children, before setting the bodies alight. They then shot themselves. Several of those killed were likely unaware of the plans and had not consented in dying, though others had, and left notes behind declaring their intentions and desires in death. The bodies were found a week later following a missing persons investigation.

The case became a media sensation. Following the case, composer Michel Tabachnik was tried for allegedly having known of the deaths before and influenced the followers into death via his writings. He was acquitted in two trials in 2001 and 2006. The precise sequence of events is controversial, and various theories sprung up alleging outside involvement, though none have ever been substantiated. Further conspiracy theories were also propagated. The case, and the Solar Temple as a whole, inflamed the fight against cults in France.

== Background ==
The Order of the Solar Temple was a religious group active in several French-speaking countries, led by Joseph Di Mambro and Luc Jouret. Founded in 1984, it was a neo-Templar secret society with eclectic beliefs sourced from many different movements like Rosicrucianism, Theosophy, and the New Age. They conceptualized the transit, or mass ritual suicide, as a ritual involving magic fire, where they would undergo a spiritual voyage to the star Sirius.

In the first 1994 "transit", 53 members of the OTS died in Switzerland and Canada, including both Di Mambro and Jouret. Many members of the group did not commit mass suicide, but were murdered in this incident. It was publicly believed that the group had disbanded, however, this was not completely true, as remnants lived on. Prior to their deaths, the group had mailed a final letter containing their message to the world. In the final testament letter, it is expressed that the departed members of the OTS would welcome any member who was "worthy" of joining them in the afterlife. An excerpt from this testament included:

We, the Servants of the Rosy-Cross, in view of the urgency of the present situation, affirm that [...] we will be able to recall the last Servants capable of hearing this ultimate message [...]. Know that wherever we are, we will always reach out to those who are worthy of joining us.

This was viewed as a "call" by the remaining OTS members. According to journalist Arnaud Bédat, it functioned to comfort the remaining members, showing them that their dead friends had not abandoned them, which served to convince them of the validity of their faith in the OTS: they were just being waited for "on the other side".

=== Remaining members ===
Even a month after the initial deaths, the remaining members of the Solar Temple began to meet up, centered around Christiane Bonet. Bonet was a 50-year-old Swiss psychotherapist; journalist Arnaud Bédat described her as "a fanatic", "totally committed to the OTS's ideology". Bonet had actually been a later arrival to the OTS than most of the members to die in the 1994 set of deaths, joining in 1989. One of her friends claimed that the day Bonet joined the OTS, Bonet said to her "well, I hope we haven't joined a cult." She later donated a 100,000 Swiss franc inheritance she received to the group, as well as her whole salary of 8,000 francs; she did not ask questions and did not express doubt of the order.

Bonet was involved in the first deaths, as the day prior to the "transit" she had called the employers of two members – Elie Di Mambro and Daniel Jaton, the former being her "cosmic" partner in the group – saying they were delayed, when in actuality both had already died in Switzerland. When interviewed by the Swiss police the day after the deaths, she acted "cold, distant, and contemptuous", denying she had known anything beforehand, saying the phone calls had been to "not dramatize the situation". She did however say that Jouret had called her the day prior to the deaths, but described this call as one in which Jouret had "wanted to convey a lot of joy to me". In reality, according to his phone records, Jouret had called her eight times and had twice signaled her on her pager in the days preceding the deaths. What they discussed is not known. She bemoaned the fact that she had not been selected for inclusion in this incident, expressing envy of Jaton, who she described to the police as having likely been a perpetrator of the 1994 deaths.

Another remaining member was André Friedli. A Swiss architect, (Note: Some sources characterize Friedli as an immigration officer. Another source says that Lardanchet and Rostan had both been immigration officers.) Friedli was described as a quiet and calm man. He had joined the OTS after meeting his wife, Jocelyne Friedli, who introduced him to the group. Bédat described both of them as "[t]otally under the influence of Luc Jouret". They both lived on the OTS's Sacred Heart commune in Sainte-Anne-de-la-Pérade in Canada. After moving to Canada, Jocelyne lost her attraction to André. Jouret's remedy to this was through the OTS practice of "cosmic" coupling, and switched the pairings with another couple. Jocelyne was paired up with Bruno Klaus (later dead in the 1997 transit), while André was paired with Rose-Marie Klaus. Rose-Marie Klaus did not like André; she later denounced the group entirely, complaining about them to the media. Following the 1994 set of deaths, Friedli reconciled with his wife, and they returned to Switzerland.

Jean-Pierre Lardanchet and Patrick Rostan were both French policemen; Lardanchet had drawn his friend Rostan into the OTS in the first place after they met in 1990, where Di Mambro considered them both the group's "armed eye". On the police force, Lardanchet was known for his non-violent approach, often refusing to take his service weapon. Lardanchet was heavily in debt, described as "dull, very withdrawn", while Rostan was described as "shy" and "fragile". At his request, Lardanchet had been transferred to Annemasse, which may have been in an effort to get closer to the OTS in Switzerland. Both men had been in Switzerland during the first deaths, likely the people inside the car that had escaped from the Cheiry farm the day prior; Lardanchet was afraid that he was going to be prosecuted as the perpetrator of the Swiss killings. Both men were called as witnesses in the trials in early 1995. While being investigated, Lardanchet claimed that he was not an OTS member. As no charges were ever filed he was allowed to continue his job. Also among the continued members were Édith and Patrick Vuarnet, wife and son of gold medal Olympic skier Jean Vuarnet, Édith being an Olympian in her own right. Patrick Vuarnet had been the person to distribute the original Testament letters for the 1994 suicides, after which he was questioned but not charged with any crime; he expressed to his brother that he felt guilty that he had not been in the first "transit".

Other remaining devoted members included the Dutch executive assistant Emmy Anderson and Mercedes Faucon. Faucon was a French retired teacher, an early follower who had done cleaning labor within the group. Di Mambro, attempting to appease her for having this lowly role, would often tell her that those members who were "last here" would be "the first in the afterlife". When she was interrogated by the French police, she claimed that she had actually left the OTS two years before the deaths, but she was evasive in answering the questions and not believed by investigators. Only a few days after the 1994 incident, she gave power of attorney over her banking account to a friend (also a member of the OTS). Anderson was a Dutch executive assistant. Unusually for the OTS, which had promiscuous sexual norms, she had never had sexual relations with anyone. To Di Mambro, she represented the "androgynous prototype that exists on Sirius". When questioned by police, she was not open with them, but declared that if she had been "called" to participate in the first set of deaths, she would have done so; she praised Di Mambro as a "cosmic being" who had been a "bearer of a very different truth". Bédat described this pair as "the diehards".

== Planning ==
Following the deaths, Bonet gathered remaining members of the OTS. She convinced them that she had established contact with Jouret and Di Mambro in the afterlife, acting as a medium, which she said she had developed the abilities for following the 1994 deaths. Other members were initially skeptical of her claims, but began to believe her. About 20 former templars met in the top floor of an old building, Bonet's workplace in Geneva, every Tuesday and Friday evening. Four members of these sessions would not die in the 1995 incident; according to these survivors, the new OTS had no structure and no individual leader. In these sessions, members meditated, though there was no strict practice. Sessions conducted in this second iteration were similar to those held by Di Mambro prior to the founding of the OTS. They also discussed their dreams, and messages received "from the beyond" by members. One of these messages told the members that they would not be left to "live through a third world war", and that instead someone would come and get them prior. Messages were generally vague.

These survivors claimed that the remaining members did not discuss transiting, but that many remaining members had dreams about those who had died and that "certain things" they were not responsible for. However, by the spring of 1995, a "transit" was possibly already being planned, with the members looking for an ideal place to conduct it. A month after the first incident, several former members were seen together in a restaurant where the 1995 deaths would eventually take place, the Vercors. The group around Bonet became more distinct, and members began to communicate to each other in a coded system through their pagers, avoiding phones except for basic things.

During this period, Bonet was contacted by her elderly mother – having heard of former member Thierry Huguenin's book Le 54e discussing his time in the OTS, she wrote to Bonet expressing her concern. She worried that she would "find out about [Bonet's] departure on television", attempting to reason with her. Bonet wrote back, ignoring her concerns, and said that Huguenin (referred to as "the unspeakable") would "know what justice is reserved for him". In this letter, she said:

When the time comes, it's back to paradise. My brothers and sisters have already made this return, leaving their earthly vehicle here. [...] I want to join them soon. [...] On the other side of the veil, death is an illusion. [...] Jo [Di Mambro] allows me to be who I need to be.

This response was threatening enough that Bonet's mother sent someone to show it to Huguenin, who upon reading it was "completely shaken". According to the person who had sent him the letter, when reading the letter Huguenin noted it had "Jouret's language" and "Di Mambro's style". Huguenin took the letter as a sign that another transit was being plotted; he had promised that he would not say anything about being shown the letter, but immediately told the Fribourg police investigators who had interrogated him several months before. These police investigators did not listen, responding only in a reassuring fashion and expressing their amusement, as they viewed the OTS as a "closed case". About this time, the Friedlis told a relative that they would soon "leave the Earth", and that they were "waiting for a call". Later in the year, they visited relatives for a family celebration, who did not notice anything unusual about them.

During this same time, André Friedli wrote his will. Friedli's relatives would later find in his home highly detailed maps of the Vercors. Early in December 1995, his car was spotted in the village of Saint-Pierre-de-Chérennes, in what was possibly a reconnaissance mission. Weapons were obtained by Jean-Pierre Lardanchet and Patrick Rostan. Writings from the group found by Swiss police had previously warned that the next mass suicide would occur on a solstice; the 1995 winter solstice would occur on 22 December.

On 12 December 1995, Bonet gathered the remaining members in her office. This gathering included most of those who would later be found dead; including among them Faucon, Anderson, and Édith and Patrick Vuarnet. It also included one couple who were not found dead in the incident. This group did not include either Lardanchet or Rostan, and was also missing Dominique Masson, a French naturopath. According to the surviving couple, nothing happened in this meeting except for an agreement to meet there again in three days.

== Deaths ==
On 15 December 1995, Bonet called those who would later die one by one. Many were undergoing Christmas preparations about this time. One member informed her family that she would spend Christmas in the Vuarnet family chalet in the Alps alongside her daughter. Masson, preparing for the group meeting later, also disappeared for an event, likely with the Friedlis as her car was later found near their home. André Friedli left work early, claiming he was ill, which his coworkers thought was odd; his wife asked to leave work early after receiving a call, and was seen by her coworkers as looking worried. It is not known how many of the members knew they were going to die. Thierry Huguenin's personal theory was that only four of the members knew of the plans for death, and that the others thought the Vercors trip was instead to encounter supernatural phenomena in which they would see Di Mambro materialize, which he viewed as the only thing that would have attracted them all to one place. The future transit was intended to bring them to the star Sirius, as with the previous one.

On the night of 15 to 16 December 1995, the members disappeared from their homes. Four of them left notes; some expressed the wish to wish to "see another world". Found in Bonet's apartment was a blank sheet of paper, with the only words being "Blank page, everything is said." Alongside it was an envelope containing a letter addressed to her son, in which she told him that: "Death does not exist and is pure illusion. May we always find ourselves through the inner life". Emmy Anderson had scattered rose petals through her apartment, and had left a will. This will indicated that she knew about the plans to die, reading in part:

To all those who can still hear and understand, life is an eternal movement, an infinite coming and going. The Eternal Present places us in a time relative to the earth and for a duration that belongs to the in-breathing and out-breathing of the breath of life. I, as the carrier of light since the end of time, the times that were assigned to me on Earth are COMPLETED and I freely and voluntarily return to where I was from, to the dawn of time! [...] It's difficult for earthlings to understand such a choice, such a gesture, to voluntarily put down their earthly vehicle! So it is with all those who carry light and cosmic consciousness, who know where they're going! May human consciousness become ever more open and subtly enriched by such an experience! The work is done, and we bring back with us the quintessence of a rich experience on planet Earth.

Édith Vuarnet withdrew 10,000 Swiss francs from a bank, immediately exchanging them for French francs. She was later picked up in a nightclub parking lot on the border of France and Switzerland, where her car was found abandoned. Her son called Jean Vuarnet at 9:30 p.m. to ask where she was. At the time he was in Switzerland. The couple that survived was told that due to a setback the evening meeting was cancelled; they were possibly viewed by Bonet as not ready for the transit. According to one of them, her voice seemed normal and "cheerful" on the phone. At 9:50 p.m. Friedli called Bonet a final time. He may have been the one responsible for picking up Vuarnet. By shortly after 10 p.m. most had left Geneva and all arrived at the French village of Saint-Pierre-de-Chérennes in the Vercors mountains, before driving up narrow roads to the Faz plateau. Saint-Pierre-de-Chérennes is a small town, then with about 300 inhabitants, west of Grenoble.

According to the hypothesis of the Grenoble Gendarmerie, following this, the members then exited their cars and entered the nearby Coulmes forest, where they walked to their final destination. This required a walk of over a 1.5 kilometres (0.93 mi) over very steep terrain, in very cold weather; with them were three children, aged 6, 4, and 2, alongside the thirteen adults. They finally came to a small clearing and went down to a hollow within it, a natural basin. This location was called the Serre du page, deep in the mountains and difficult to access; near this place was a location called the Puits de l’enfer or le Trou de l'enfer, lit. 'Well of Hell' or 'the Hellhole'. It was located some 3,900 feet above the nearby Isère river in a forest preserve. They sat in a circle around a fire, where they took sedative drugs and were then unconscious.

While lying on their backs, the members were then shot dead by Jean-Pierre Lardanchet and André Friedli. The two mothers with children (Marie-France Lardanchet and Patrick Vuarnet's partner Ute Verona) had likely resisted before the killing of their children, as prior to their deaths they had each been hit in the head with a blunt object. Their skulls had signs of fracture. Each child had been shot once in the forehead, while the adults were killed by a point blank .22 Long Rifle blast to the head and also a bullet to the heart. Lardanchet's own children were two of those killed in the incident. A single victim had died from three bullets to the heart, while Patrick Rostan was the only person to have been killed by two different weapons. Following the deaths, Lardanchet and Friedli then poured gas over the bodies, setting them alight, before each shot themselves in the head with a Manurhin .357 Magnum, both police service weapons. Friedli's body fell into the fire, while Lardanchet's fell facedown on the ground.

The 14 bodies were laid out in a circle star or sunburst formation; the bodies of the other two were near them. The dead in the star were situated with their heads oriented towards the outside of the circle, with plastic bags on their heads. The bodies were charred. Near the bodies were amassed several objects, including medicine and flashlights but also guns (two .22 LR rifles and two 9mm pistols, one of which had a silencer, police service weapons). In one of the cars belonging to the Templars, a paper was found that indicated the location of the dead. The circumstances leading to the deaths were very similar to the initial 1994 incident; all of the dead were Solar Temple members or their relatives, most of them had been drugged with sedatives, and they had gunshot wounds. Investigators concluded that of the 16 dead, at least four had not died willingly. Half the dead were French, and the other half were Swiss.

Those killed in the incident were: (Note: Spellings of many of the individual's names vary between sources; the spellings of the names as used in this article are from Bédat, Bouleau & Nicolas 2000, pp. 385–413.)

- Emmy Anderson, 52
- Christiane Bonet, 50
- Mercedes Faucon, 62
- André Friedli, 39
- Jocelyne Friedli, 49
- Jean-Pierre Lardanchet, 36
- Marie-France Lardanchet, 34
- Aldwin Lardanchet, 4
- Curval Lardanchet, 2
- Enrique Massip, 46
- Dominique Masson, 43
- Patrick Rostan, 29
- Ute Verona, 34
- Tanis Verona, 6
- Édith Vuarnet, 61
- Patrick Vuarnet, 27

== Investigation ==
Two days after this, on 18 December 1995, the mother of Ute Verona, worried, went to the police, as she had not heard from either Verona or her daughter in three days. A missing person report was filed in response, and two days later Verona's employer was contacted. A colleague, who had also had OTS ties, told the police that the other followers had also disappeared. Following this the police investigation strengthened. They intended to keep the investigation a secret, but information was leaked to the Swiss newspaper Tribune de Genève which then spread to other media outlets. After this leak, on the 22nd, while watching television reports a French hunter recalled that he had seen on the 16th of December several cars registered from other places parked in Saint-Pierre-de-Chérennes, along with many footprints going into the forest. He had also noticed a smell "of burnt leather or human flesh", like "death". Following this, he reported it to police.

When the police arrived, these cars were found to belong to OTS members. They cordoned off the area and began to search for the missing Templars, with hundreds of police and several helicopters all participating in the search. The search was conducted in the rain, and the forest was very dense with many chasms. The morning of the 23rd, the hunter attempted to lead the police to where he had noticed the smell, and shortly before 9 a.m. the bodies were found. Shortly after the bodies were discovered, Grenoble's public prosecutor Jean-François Lorans opened a judicial investigation into "murder and criminal association". He stated that "We consider that the circumstances in which these murders were committed imply a degree of preparation, deliberation and premeditation that fall within the notion of organized crime. We are dealing with a real criminal organization."

The investigation was headed by judge Luc Fontaine, the examining magistrate of Grenoble. Previously a prosecutor in Bonneville, he had only been in the position for a month. The investigation ultimately concluded that the two members of the group had killed the others and then themselves. This theory was reconstructed with animal remains and was agreed to be conclusive. They concluded that there was no external involvement in the deaths on the grounds of a lack of evidence. Fontaine's investigation was criticized at the time due to this decision. The investigation was done with limited resources, and Fontaine was not relieved of his other cases while investigating, which displeased the civil parties in the case. Some believed in outside involvement, particularly Alain Leclerc, the lawyer for several of the civil parties in the case, and the relatives of several of the dead, who believed that the actual perpetrators had escaped and had never been caught. On 17 November 1998, investigating judge Luc Fontaine presented the conclusions of his inquiry into the deaths.

=== Tabachnik's trial ===
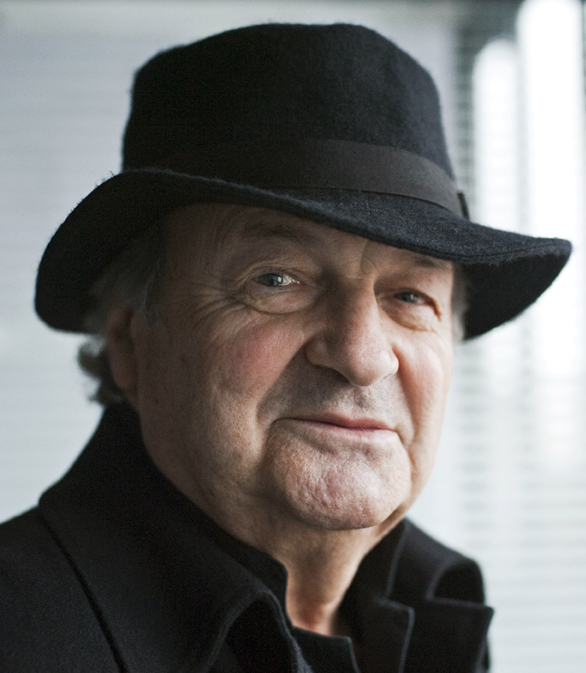
Michel Tabachnik in 2010

Composer Michel Tabachnik was investigated following the incident; Fontaine placed him under examination on 12 June 1996 for conspiracy. Prior Swiss investigations had not established any connection between Tabachnik and the 1994 deaths. The case was sent to trial in 2001. On 25 June, the court acquitted Tabachnik, on the basis that there had been no significant or conclusive proof uncovered that Tabachnik had orchestrated the killings, and his writings accused of influencing the members into suicide were deemed unlikely to have influenced the members. The case was appealed, and after several delays there was a second trial held in 2006. The appeals court upheld the lower court's ruling, and he was acquitted a second time in December 2006. Tabachnik continues to deny any involvement in the planning of the deaths.

== Aftermath ==
The case became headline news in France. As both leaders of the OTS had died in the original incident, that the incident had occurred provoked a significant response; due to the deaths of both leaders it had been unimaginable to investigators that the deaths would continue. The mayor of Saint-Pierre-de-Chérennes expressed his shock, stating "[w]e can't understand why our little village was chosen for this tragedy". He theorized that the OTS members may have been trying to find the Well of Hell. The head of police in Geneva stated that he was surprised that the first investigation had not "opened the cult members' eyes" and that it was "a colossal waste."

In the aftermath, officials of the French government and the Canadian hydroelectric utility Hydro-Québec expressed their concern that the OTS had possibly infiltrated government agencies. France formed a government watchdog designed to fight cults; a child was removed from her mother's custody temporarily, due to her past affiliation with the OTS. A spokesman for the Quebec cult-watching organization Info-Secte warned that the group continued to secretly operate, while former member Hermann Delorme said another transit might occur on the summer solstice of 1996. This did not happen.

André Piller, the judge who had presided over the investigation into the Swiss case, was the subject of attention following the second incident. The French media criticized what they perceived as the "levity" of the Swiss justice system in dealing with the case; questioned over whether the second case was preventable, he said that "[n]othing, absolutely nothing, suggested that anyone would take up the torch and organize such a tragedy". This was disputed by Huguenin, who had previously alerted the police. Piller argued they had been investigating those killed in the first set of deaths, saying that many of those killed had been wiretapped or interrogated for many hours, and that nothing they had seen gave any concrete sign of a new one; he said that Huguenin had not been able to give them any solid clues. At the same time the Geneva chief of police stated the opposite, claiming that they had no right to monitor anyone and that they had not monitored anyone in the Solar Temple. In a radio interview several months later, Piller stated that he had not had any responsibility in the deaths.

== Legacy ==
Two years later, five more members of the OTS died in a mass suicide in Quebec. The OTS case was noted as intensifying the French effort against cults. By coincidence, the deaths were discovered a day after the Guyard–Gest parliamentary report on cults in France came out. The report had more far-reaching recommendations than prior ones, with a harsher tone; the report did not mention the OTS, but the coincidence gave it increased prominence. According to cult researcher Susan J. Palmer, this second set of deaths may have been a copycat crime, a tribute to Di Mambro and Jouret's charisma; alternatively, both transits could have been driven by theological and group forces within the OTS.

Due to several strange aspects of the incident, many conspiracy theories resulted, many revolving around external involvement. One idea was that the members had actually been killed by the French government using the Barbouzes; another theory was that French anti-cult activists had actually murdered them and then staged it as a suicide. Former member Hermann Delorme had his own theory; interviewed by cult researcher Susan J. Palmer in 1995, he claimed that the second incident was actually murder by a secret "rear guard" left by the OTS to kill those who continued to practice. According to him, secret documents and tapes left by the OTS showed that that the second incident was supposed to be the final one. He believed that due to Bonet's continuing activities, this rear guard activated and killed them, "to put a complete end to the group"; he claimed the Vercors group had not resisted as this was necessary "to get to Sirius". Thierry Huguenin believed that Di Mambro had left behind instructions for the second transit to some members of the group, one of which was Bonet, saying that "I am convinced that he left a will, verbal or written, for this second journey. I knew the man too well. He was so Machiavellian." The role of French police officers in the case lead some to believe that they were a sign of infiltration or outside manipulation of the OTS.

There were also some testimonies by residents near the site that contradicted the main story, that there was no outside involvement. One woman claimed that she had seen on the night of the 14th three black Mercedes registered in Switzerland speeding through the town. Another was the story of a couple who owned a house near the town, who had come across three high-end vehicles going towards the town, before 1 a.m. on the 16th. According to the police, the occupants of these vehicles could not have had time to participate in the deaths, but it was later found out that it had occurred after 1 a.m. Fontaine believed the vehicles the couple saw were the cars of the members, searching for the Lardanchets, late arrivals. There were some criticisms as to the extent of Friedli's involvement in the hypothesis put forward by the Grenoble gendarme. While the gun was to the right of Friedli, according to his family he was left handed. According to an independent expert consulted by Friedli's brother, looking at the ballistics report, only two of the 21 shots fired could have been fired by a left handed person. Alain Vuarnet continues to believe in external involvement involving flamethrowers used to burn the bodies; a problem with this theory is that there were no other footprints besides those of the dead, and there was never a trace of any flamethrower. Many victim's families also believe in external involvement.

Twenty years after the events, Luc Fontaine, now the president of the investigation chamber of Lyon, said he was still haunted by the case. He stated of the investigation that: "I sometimes think: shouldn't we have gone deeper into this aspect, or tried to emphasize another? But in this case, each door was followed by a corridor leading to 60 other doors! And the more doors we opened, the further we got from the heart of the case. An examining magistrate is not a historian or a specialist in occult movements." Fontaine defended his investigation's ruling that there was no outside involvement, saying there was no strong evidence that this had happened. He did however acknowledge that it was not impossible. According to him, there had been two "intellectually plausible" theories, either that "the group set up and executed its project based on its esoteric ideology", or that the esotericism was a front for some other reason for the murders, but that there had been no evidence for the latter. He described the victim's families as having been "terribly hurt", looking for a rational explanation for the deaths where none existed.
