= Jean Laborie =

French bishop (1919–1996)

- Laborie (left) ordaining Luc Jouret (right) in 1984

Personal life
- Born: Jean Joseph Emile Laborie; 16 November 1919 Aude, France
- Died: 25 June 1996 (aged 76)

Religious life
- Religion: Christian
- Church: Latin Old Catholic Church

Jean Joseph Emile Laborie (16 November 1919 – 25 June 1996) was a French bishop of an independent Catholic church, the Latin Old Catholic Church in Toulouse. His early life is largely unknown, but he had little involvement in religion. The date of his ordination is controversial; a traditionalist, he rejected the reforms of the Second Vatican Council, and became active in religious activities outside of the Roman Catholic Church. He was a schismatic bishop not recognized by Catholic authorities, despite his attempts.

Catholic authorities warned to the press that he was unrecognized by the Vatican. Laborie was part of the Thuc line of independent bishops, with Thuc having consecrated him in 1977. He was sometimes controversial, with his movement having some fund scandals. Notoriously, he ordained Luc Jouret to the priesthood; Jouret was the leader of the Order of the Solar Temple who would later go on to orchestrate mass murder and suicide in the 1990s.

== Early life ==
Jean Joseph Emile Laborie was born 16 November 1919 in the Aude department of France. By his own account he spent his early life doing menial laboring jobs with no involvement in religion. Most of his early life is unknown. He did not become ordained until he was 45. The date of his ordination as a priest is controversial; some sources say he was first ordained before World War II. Some claim he was ordained by Irénée Poncelin d'Eschevannes (Patriarch of Galicia) on 30 October 1965, while a leaflet gives the date as 13 May 1965 (probably a symbolic date, as it was the date of several miracle visions).

Following the Second Vatican Council, Laborie, a traditionalist, was disturbed; he rejected modernization efforts, including the conduction of mass in languages other than Latin. In his forties he quickly discovered a vocation for religious life outside of the official Roman Catholic Church.

== Religious activities ==
He was consecrated as an independent bishop 2 October 1966 by Jean-Pierre Danyel, a bishop of the Celtic Orthodox Church. He was re-consecrated conditionally by Louis Jean Stanislaus Canivet on 26 August 1968. On 2 October 1966, he proclaimed himself bishop of Narbonne and Lavaur; his movement was called the "Old Catholic Church, French Branch" (French: Église vieille-catholique, branche française). Laborie, as well as Yves Lavigne – another figure often associated with him, who had become a bishop at the same time in 1968 from Canivet – operated Catholic services as they were done prior to the Second Vatican Council. Several notices were published in local newspapers and diocese bulletins, written by archbishop of Toulouse and the bishop of Montauban, warning that Laborie's movement was not a Catholic one as it was not in communion with the Pope.

Laborie's movement gained strong influence in Toulouse, due to its strong traditionalist leanings. They welcomed the homeless and elderly, but also had a community of younger spiritualists. They had a chapel in Toulouse and a property in Portet-sur-Garonne; they had another location in Saint-Paul-d'Espis, after Laborie noticed the large number of people making pilgrimage there. The movement joined the Ecumenical League for Christian Unity (French: Ligue œcuménique pour l'Unité Chrétienne), which aimed to unify schismatic Catholic Churches. In 1973, the movement was then the Latin Catholic Ecclesial Community French: Communauté ecclésiale catholique latine), renamed to the Latin-Traditional Catholic Community (French: Communauté catholique latine-traditionnelle) by 1993, or the Latin Catholic Church (French: Église catholique latine). The movement grew, and the Espis location was enlarged in 1979. Another church was created in 1983, Sainte-Rita in Le Mirail, where Laborie preached from. Laborie was known for his performance of alleged miracles and healing.

He tried to have his movement recognized by the Holy See, but was consistently rejected. He was a somewhat schismatic figure, not in communication with either Rome or the conference of French bishops. In 1974, he declared that Rome was considering admitting his movement; he was re-consecrated conditionally a second time on 8 February 1977 by Traditionalist Catholic Archbishop Pierre Martin Ngo Dinh Thuc. Thuc had already consecrated several other controversial figures, and was then excommunicated from the Catholic Church. Thuc's consecration of Laborie was not made public until the 1980s. The Congregation for the Doctrine of the Faith declared in 1987 that this changed nothing and they would not recognize him. Another church was built, which was inaugurated on 22 May 1983. In 1974, he ordained Jean Marie Kozik, the founder of the Fraternité Notre-Dame, a traditionalist Catholic order, and his colleague Michael Fernandez; this ordination was rejected later on due to his association with some liberal Catholic elements, so they sought other ordinations later on.

Laborie was contacted by Luc Jouret, asking him to be ordained as a priest. Laborie, appreciative of someone willing to follow in his footsteps, which was rare, agreed to this quickly. To make the ceremony more original, Jouret suggested they hold it in an actual chapel, which Laborie appreciated. Laborie still had some concerns, to which Jouret blatantly lied and suggest his motivation to become a priest was a desire to evangelize, and after becoming one he would move to Africa to preach the word of Laborie's church; his actual motive was to obtain more power over his group, gaining his own movement prestige. The ordination was done in the Château d'Auty in January 1984. He also ordained Thierry Huguenin, another member alongside Jouret, and two other members. Following this Jouret invited him to lunch in the château.

This was controversial following Jouret's orchestrations of the Solar Temple cult mass suicides in 1994. When it was revealed that Laborie had ordained Jouret, this action was harshly criticized by the other members of his church; Laborie argued that Jouret, along with the three other men he had ordained, had true faith and seemed very sympathetic. In February 1996, as a result of this and his age, he gave up ordination completely. Further, in his career Laborie had several rumors of improper fund usage as well as bad business dealings. In 1996, the movement had some 1,500 members. He had also been accused of both hypertraditionalist values and Satanism.

== Death and legacy ==
Laborie died 25 June 1996. Scholar Bernard Vignot described him as an "affable man", whose reputation was spread far beyond his region due to his service to others, especially "unfortunate people", though noted the bad aspects of his legacy such as the money scandals and the ordination of Jouret. Vignot wrote that Laborie was, though a marginal figure, representative of the kind of Christian troubled by the Vatican reforms and attempting to maintain more traditional practice. According to Vignot, Laborie had "succeeded by unorthodox means in imposing himself on the religious market", and said he had was known for his charisma and status as a miracle worker.
