= Jean Vuarnet =

French alpine skier (1933–2017)

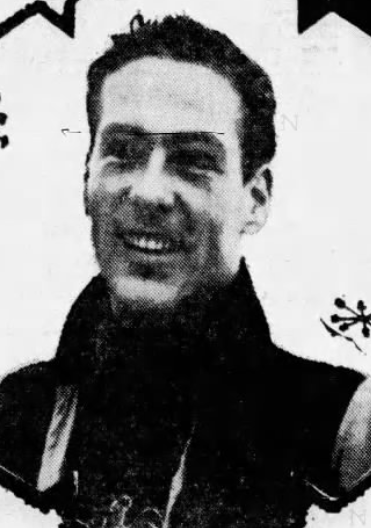
- 1961 photo of Vuarnet

Personal information
- Born: Jean Raoul Célina André Vuarnet; 18 January 1933 Le Bardo, Tunisia
- Died: 1 January 2017 (aged 83) Sallanches, Haute-Savoie, France
- Spouses: Edith Bonlieu (m. 1958; died 1995) Christiane Veillon (m. 1999; died 2012)
- Children: 4

Skiing career
- Sport: Alpine skiing ♂

Olympics
- Teams: 1 – (1960)
- Medals: 1 (1 gold)

World Championships
- Teams: 2 – (1958, 1960) (includes Olympics)
- Medals: 2 (1 gold)
Medal record
Men's alpine skiing
Representing France
Olympic Games
Gold medal – first place	1960 Squaw Valley	Downhill
World Championships
Bronze medal – third place	1958 Bad Gastein	Downhill

Jean Raoul Célina André Vuarnet (18 January 1933 – 1 January 2017) was an alpine ski racer from France. An Olympic gold medalist, he is known for inventing the "Tuck" skiing position, and was the first Olympian to win a gold medal using metal skis. Raised in Morzine, he had a childhood interest in skiing, which he pursued. He won a bronze medal in the downhill at the World Championships in 1958 at Bad Gastein, before winning gold in the same event in the 1960 Winter Olympics in Squaw Valley. Vuarnet was also the author of several books on skiing. He gave his name to the Vuarnet brand in 1961. In 1995, his wife Edith Bonlieu, a fellow Olympian, and their son Patrick both died in a mass murder-suicide of members of the Order of the Solar Temple.

== Early life ==
Jean Raoul Célina André Vuarnet was born in Le Bardo, Tunisia, on 18 January 1933. His father Victor Vuarnet was a doctor and had a medical practice there. The year after his birth, his family moved to Morzine, France, where he grew up. He was introduced to skiing as a young child, childhood friends with future director Roger Vadim. His parents divorced in 1943, after which he was sent to boarding schools in the cities of Paris and Lyon.

He attended law school at the University of Grenoble (due in part to Grenoble's location being fit for skiing), enrolling in 1952. During this period he skied competitively and was romantically involved with Christiane Veillon, a French Canadian woman two years his junior whom he met at a dance. Veillon became pregnant, and mailed him a letter announcing this, but letter was intercepted by Vuarnet's father, who did not tell his son. As a result she returned to Montreal on her own.

== Career ==
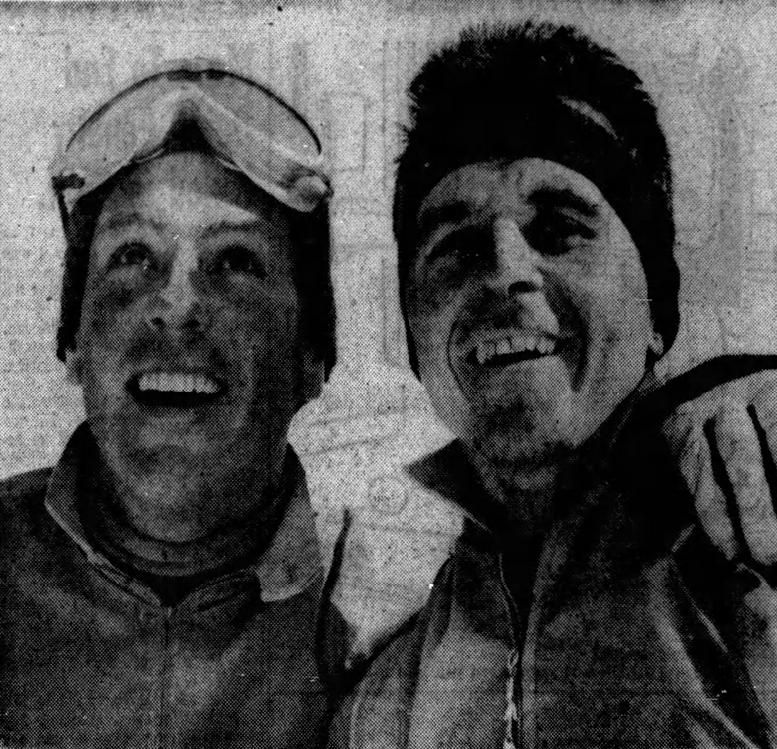
Vuarnet (left) hugging his brother-in-law François Bonlieu after Bonlieu's win in 1960

As Vuarnet believed himself to not be a natural skier, he instead focused on studying technique of successful skiers. He trained under French skier and physical education instructor Georges Joubert, and won several races (downhill, slalom, and combined) in the 1952 French University Games. He and Joubert co-authored a book on ski techniques in 1956, Ski ABC: Technique Moderne, and several other books on skiing techniques.

From 1957 to 1959, Vuarnet achieved seven titles as a French skiing champion: twice in the downhill (1958, 1959), slalom (1957, 1958) and alpine combined, and in the giant slalom (1957). He won bronze in the same event at the World Championships in 1958 at Bad Gastein in Salzburg, Austria.

The high point of Vuarnet's racing career came at age 27 at the 1960 Winter Olympics in Squaw Valley, where he won the gold medal in the downhill. The tenth racer on the course, he won by a full half-second. For this win he used the position he had invented, "the egg" (French: l'œuf), now known as The Tuck, a lower stance in which he squatted down, back parallel to the slope and leaning down, to reduce drag from wind in a bid to increase his speed. He was also the first to win an Olympic gold medal on metal skis, versus the standard wooden ones, which were given to him only a few days before the race.

After retiring from active competition, Vuarnet became head of the Italian ski team from 1968 to 1972, and vice-president of the French Ski Federation, a role in which he served from 1972 to 1974.

== Business ==
In the early 1960s, Vuarnet was asked by his hometown of Morzine to help develop the skiing area around the town. He did so by creating the purpose-build resort of Avoriaz, together with a group of young architects. Around Avoriaz he developed a new area for alpine skiing, later linked to other areas in France and Switzerland known as ehe Portes du Soleil. He was appointed the director of tourism in Morzine.

Following his Olympic victory he gave his name to the Vuarnet brand. He had used in his 1960 victory Skilynx lenses, created by Roger Pouilloux in 1957; following his victory, he met Pouilloux, and they became friends, creating the eyewear line. The brand produced a popular line of anti-glare sunglasses, as well as watches and skiwear.

== Personal life ==
In 1958, he married Edith Bonlieu, a three-time French women's ski champion and fellow Olympian, sister of François Bonlieu. They had three sons, Alain, Pierre, and Patrick, born in 1962, 1963 and 1969, respectively. Their marriage grew strained as his success increased, and Edith joined the notorious Order of the Solar Temple group, along with Patrick. The family did not know of their connection to the Solar Temple until the 1994 mass suicides, after which their names were mentioned in the police report.

After the first suicides, Edith claimed that she had nothing to do with the group anymore, but the next year, Edith and Patrick were among the members of the Solar Temple who committed mass murder-suicide in 1995 in a clearing called the "pit of hell" in France. Their bodies were found burnt in a star formation in the Vercors. Following their deaths, Vuarnet wrote a book about the case, Ils ont tué ma femme et mon fils, lit. 'They killed my wife and son', telling of her behavior prior to the deaths. The Vuarnet family dispute that it was a mass suicide, proposing instead that they were murdered by outside forces.

Following the death of Edith, he reunited with his past lover Christiane Veillon in 1996, after she sent him a condolence letter following Edith and Patrick's death. He then discovered that she had their child, Catherine, more than forty years prior. His daughter did not know that Vuarnet was her father until seven years before this. Vuarnet and Veillon married in 1996. Christiane died of a heart attack in 2012.

On the 50th anniversary of his Olympic win, a glass statue of Vuarnet was unveiled in his home town of Morzine, in the "Tuck" position.

== Death ==
After a stroke, Vuarnet died at age 83 at Sallanches, Haute-Savoie, on 1 January 2017.

== Publications ==
- Joubert, Georges; —— (1956). Ski ABC: Technique Moderne (in French). Editions Bressanes. OCLC 7713816. Translated into English by John Ceely in 1957
- —— (1961). Notre victoire olympique (in French). Paris: Arthaud. OCLC 21279520.
- —— (1996). Lettre à ceux qui ont tué ma femme et mon fils (in French). Paris: Fixot. ISBN 2-221-08301-6. OCLC 409505342.
