= Fraternité Notre-Dame =

Independent traditionalist Catholic order

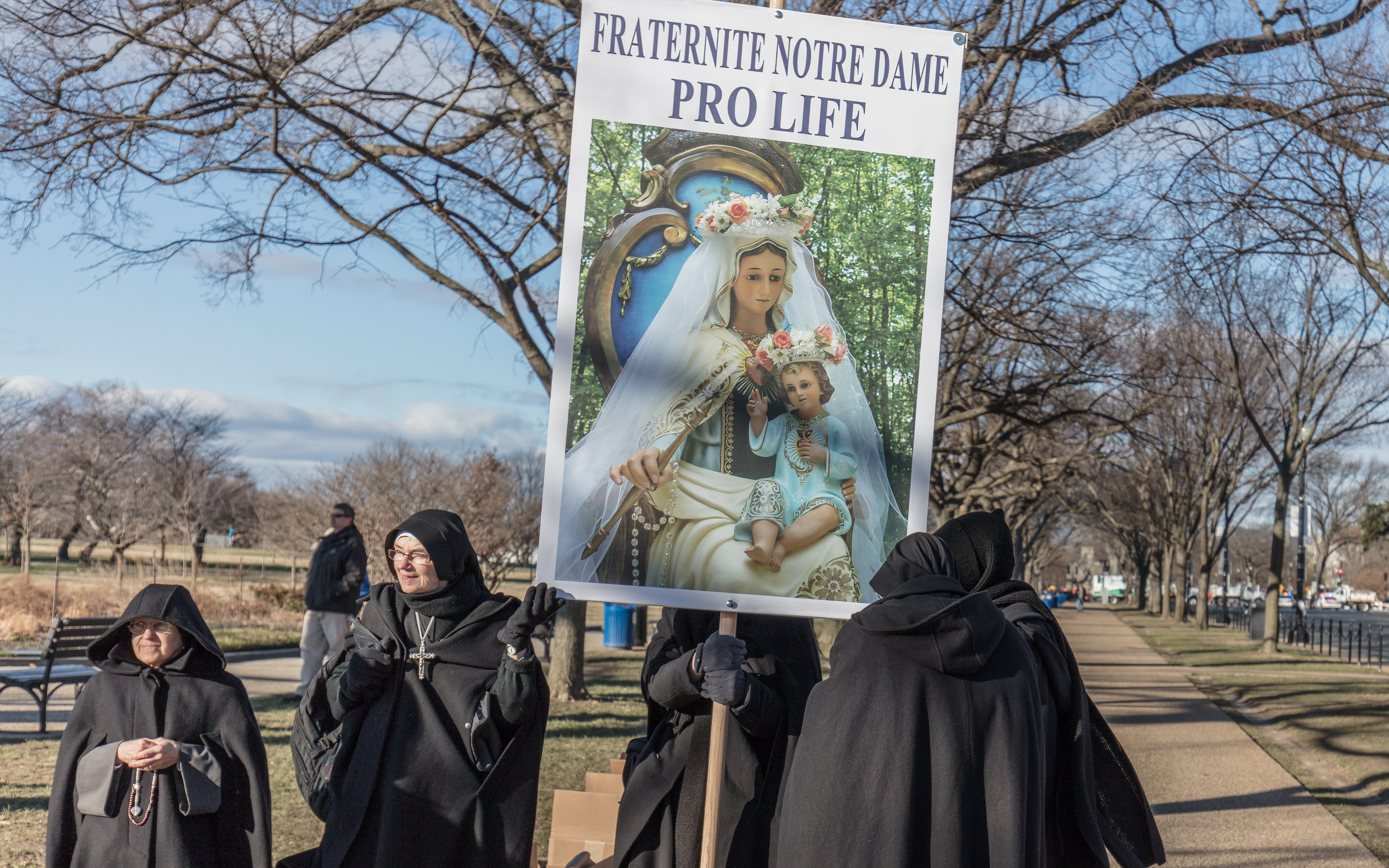
- at 2017 March for Life (Washington, D.C.)
- Formation: 1977
- Founder: Jean Marie Kozik
- Headquarters: Austin, Chicago, Illinois

Fraternité Notre-Dame is a traditionalist Catholic order of priests and nuns that is not in union with the Pope.

== Origins ==
The origins of Fraternité Notre-Dame are in the reported apparitions of the Virgin Mary in Fréchou, France. They were allegedly received in 1977 by Jean Marie Kozik, a Frenchman of Polish origin. He had been consecrated as a bishop in 1974 by Jean Laborie, a controversial bishop, and then by the dissident and excommunicated Vietnamese Archbishop Ngô Đình Thục.

== Today ==
Fraternité Notre-Dame's "Mother House" is in Austin, Chicago, yet it is not recognized by the Archdiocese of Chicago. It operates religious and humanitarian missions on four continents.

The order operates soup kitchens and weekly food pantries in Paris, New York City, San Francisco (2008), Austin, Chicago, and Ulan Bator.

A hospital for the poor has been opened in Mongolia, and it has also operated humanitarian convoys to benefit those victimized by war in Croatia, Bosnia, Kosovo, and Rwanda.

=== Chicago ===
The Fraternité Notre-Dame nuns have become fixtures at numerous Chicago area farmer's markets selling traditional French pastries to raise funds for the group.
