= Camille Pilet =

Swiss sales director (1926–1994)

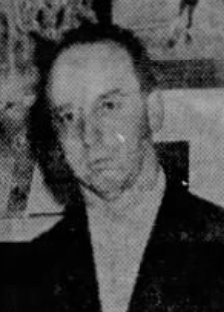
- Pilet, pictured at a watch display in 1964
- Born: February 17, 1926; La Côte-aux-Fées, Canton of Neuchâtel, Switzerland
- Died: October 5, 1994 (aged 68); Cheiry, Canton of Fribourg, Switzerland
- Employer: Piaget SA
- Organization: Order of the Solar Temple

Camille Pilet (17 February 1926 – 5 October 1994) was a Swiss member of the Order of the Solar Temple and an employee of the Swiss watch company Piaget SA for over 40 years. Pilet was influential on the growth and development of Piaget and served as its world sales director until his retirement in 1990. He was also a high-ranking member of the Solar Temple, often described as a cult, and died in their 1994 mass murder–suicide in Cheiry, Switzerland.

As Piaget's worldwide sales director, Pilet helped the company develop and was a significant influence on the brand. He assisted in the sale of Baume et Mercier to Piaget in 1964. Pilet acquired a net worth of SFr 40,000,000 through work outside of the watch business, mostly through real estate dealings. In 1981, after a heart attack, Pilet met homeopath Luc Jouret. He became a follower of Jouret and later joined the group he led, the Order of the Solar Temple. Pilet became the Solar Temple's primary financial benefactor and gave them millions of Swiss francs; as a result, he rose quickly in the order and likely kept the group from going bankrupt.

Seen in the order as the reincarnation of Joseph of Arimathea, Pilet claimed to receive messages from other dimensions and to channel messages from entities. Messages said to be received by Pilet suggested that the group "transit", what they called mass suicide. In 1994, 54 members of the Solar Temple, including Pilet, either killed themselves or were murdered in Switzerland and Canada. Pilet was likely a voluntary participant and helped to orchestrate the mass murder–suicides.

== Early life ==
Camille Pilet was born 17 February 1926 in La Côte-aux-Fées, in the Canton of Neuchâtel, Switzerland. La Côte-aux-Fées is a small town of some 500 people that borders France. Pilet had a sister. Pilet was a bachelor and never married; friends recalled him as somewhat effeminate. While he still lived in his hometown, he regularly attended church.

Pilet never received a degree from any institution. Beginning in 1945, Pilet worked as a traveling salesman. He trained as a sales clerk in Fleurier. He learned six languages, self-taught largely through disc recordings. Associates described him as a very hard worker and as resourceful.

== Watch sales career ==
In 1945, Pilet was hired by the Swiss multinational watch company Piaget SA, headquartered in his hometown, and moved to Geneva as their world sales director and manager. He helped the company to be a worldwide success and influenced the development of the brand. Assisting head Gerald Piaget, they built up a worldwide distribution network for Piaget SA, which incorporated metropolitan cities but also more exotic ones, which influenced the company's branding. In 1959, he invited three Cuban expatriates to help them develop the American market for the brand, which they accepted, signing a distribution contract with Pilet. He was known as a workaholic; associates described him as working so hard that "his wife was the company".

Pilet worked for the company for 45 years, and was promoted to world sales director after thirty years of service. The company's best salesman, he regularly traveled for Piaget around the world. He visited Australia as their sales manager through the 1960s and 1980s. He also frequently visited Los Angeles. In 1962, he transported a £20,000 collection of 500 watches to Australia, for which he had to pay a security deposit of £17,000. At its time this was the most valuable collection of its kind to be introduced in Australia. He arrived again in 1987 with a collection of 300 watches worth A$15,000,000, which were displayed. He assisted in the sale of Baume et Mercier to Piaget in 1964, and the founding of other watch companies.

His service allowed him to amass a large fortune, mostly through real estate. He also made money from selling his shares in two American watch companies. Initially he gave largely to charity and to his family. He owned properties in several countries, and at one time had a network of 40 million francs. In the early 1960s, Pilet left his hometown for his company work. In an effort to avoid Swiss taxes, he legally lived in Panama for several years, before moving to Monte Carlo. In his free time he maintained a private art collection, including works by Pablo Picasso, Salvador Dalí, and Andy Warhol. He was never officially in a relationship but began a long-term affair with an Italian woman. As part of the Solar Temple investigation, some of his financial transactions in Monaco were investigated and seen as questionable.

== Solar Temple ==
Pilet became a Rosicrucian, specifically a member of the Rosicrucian order AMORC, and had let the followers of a guru stay in his home for a time. He was known as something of a hypochondriac; after suffering a heart attack, preoccupied with his health and dieting, Pilet met in 1981 the doctor and homeopath Luc Jouret. Jouret was 21 years his junior and treated him for a heart issue and discussed with him healthy eating. Pilet, grateful for his recovery and attributing it to Jouret, became a follower and a friend. In 1987, he officially joined the Order of the Solar Temple, a group led by Jouret and Joseph Di Mambro. The Order of the Solar Temple was often described as a cult.

He rose quickly within the order, possibly due to the vast amounts of money he donated. He donated over SFr 4,000,000 to the order, its last substantial donator. It is likely that Pilet's donations kept the group from going bankrupt, and were used by the OTS to buy properties. In 1989, Pilet was initiated with the black cape, a sign of high rank in the order, much faster than the others to have achieved that rank. Relative to others already in the order, he was a relatively recent addition. He was the main financial provider of the OTS and the wealthiest businessman in the order. He frequently visited Australia for OTS purposes beginning in the late 1980s. This later led to various unsubstantiated conspiracies about the money the OTS had in their accounts there. A former group member testified that by 1988, Jouret was "living off" of Pilet's money. Pilet was extremely devoted, one of the most faithful members of the group; scholars Massimo Introvigne and Jean-François Mayer described him as a "fanatical proponent" of the OTS. Newspaper accounts portrayed him as the group's "number 3". In 1989 Di Mambro commissioned him to buy a property in Ampus, France, which was worth 2 million francs, but the sale was cancelled and the deposit, worth 100,000 francs, was lost.

Pilet worked full time for Piaget until he retired from the company in 1990. According to journalist Arnaud Bédat, early that year Jouret "fell in love" with Pilet, as testified by a former member, who said Jouret was "very much in love with him". In 1990 Pilet told his mistress of over 25 years that he could no longer be in a sexual relationship with her, claiming this was because he wanted to take a spiritual path; in reality this was because he was with Jouret. Deeply ashamed of their relationship and blaming Pilet for it, Jouret publicly mistreated Pilet. Few people in the group knew they were having a sexual relationship, with one of them being Di Mambro. He lived in the same house as Jouret in Geneva for some time. Though he owned a luxury property there, at this time Pilet returned only occasionally to La Côte-aux-Fées to visit his family; he usually went with Jouret. He jointly held several real estate companies with Di Mambro and held a joint stock company with another member of the OTS. He rented a luxury apartment next to Di Mambro's in Australia. Di Mambro asked him and other members of the OTS to purchase land in Australia for their "survival centers".

=== Mass suicide plans ===
Also that year, the group began to have several problems, including defections and investigations targeting it. In 1992, while on a trip in Switzerland, Jouret and Pilet were tipped off somehow that the OTS was being investigated in Canada, and sought out an attorney, who could not figure out why they were being searched. They failed to inform the two members of the OTS who were being strung along by a government informant; they were later arrested. Jouret was later convicted as part of the same case. Pilet and Jouret's lawyer thought he could get it overturned, but Jouret refused, fearing more publicity; their lawyer described both men as "very preoccupied by a question of image". The group began plotting a "transit", which initially was them being picked up by aliens, but evolved into the conception of the members committing mass suicide.

From their first meeting, Di Mambro declared Pilet to be the reincarnation of Joseph of Arimathea. Due to his status as the reincarnation of Joseph of Arimathea, he received a prime position within the order; he was the one to symbolize the Holy Grail and who was to receive Christ's blood during the Last Supper, therefore privileged above all to receive final messages. Within the OTS, he served as a prophet who engaged in divination. He and Di Mambro both claimed to channel from an entity called the "Heavenly Lady". In 1993 he was declared one of the only OTS members to be able to transmit messages received from other dimensions, which would be done in an altered state. The messages received by Pilet often indicated the group's plans to "depart" the Earth. The messages received by Pilet confirmed the group's belief in "Transit" and prepared the others in the group for their future mass suicides. Beginning in early 1994, Pilet had planned to re-enter the watch business with the launch of his own brand of high-end designer watches with the Swiss company Prestige Time. Due to his death this did not occur.

Several letters were written by the group declaring their intentions in mass suicide. The letters divided the dead into three groups: "Traitors", who were to be murdered, "Immortals", who had been "helped" in death (killed) by other members, and the "Awakened", who were to commit voluntary suicide. Leading up to the deaths, the most devoted members of the order were offered several videotapes, which included their beliefs and alluded to the plans. The third tape, "Joseph of Arimathea—Message", was a combination of four parts. The first was Pilet reading out messages he had received in a trance state 8 February 1994; another incorporated him reading out another work, "Du Graal à la Troisième Force". This text claims to discuss "the final Transmutation of the human into a divine man" and those who "pass through the Narrow Gate and take with them the capital Energy/Consciousness of all terrestrial Evolution, imprinted in their cells". He recounts these concepts in a trance like state while Jouret gives him the microphone. This is succeeded by what scholar Jean-Marie Abgrall described as a "strange sequence" involving 54 members of the group, and another Pilet trance message.

Two weeks before the mass suicides, Pilet bought one of the Solar Temple's three chalets in Salvan, Switzerland from Di Mambro. Jouret and Di Mambro owned the others. On 30 September, Di Mambro had a meal with some followers near Montreux in Switzerland; according to an attendee (Vuarnet) Di Mambro had asked him to meet them, including Jouret and Pilet. They were joined shortly after by Daniel Jaton, who went off to speak with Jouret. Pilet paid the bill. At an unclear time during this period the members in Salvan recorded a final video tape, later discovered by investigators, showing about a dozen of the followers in their last meal, including Jouret, Di Mambro, Pilet, and several others. During the tape, the members sing The Knights of the Round Table; in another part, Pilet tries and fails to contact the "Masters".

== Death ==
During the night from 2 to 3 October 1994, 23 members of the OTS, including Pilet, died in Cheiry, Switzerland, as part of a mass murder-suicide orchestrated by the OTS. Most were shot, some repeatedly. Pilet and another member, Renée Pfaehler, instead died of another suffocation from plastic bags. 25 people were also found dead in an OTS's chalet in Salvan. 5 other people tied to the OTS had died in a connected murder–suicide in Canada several days earlier, including a baby. On 5 October 1994, (Note: This is the date the bodies were discovered and the date they were declared to have died. The specific date of actual death of those at Cheiry is confused, but they probably died earlier, probably on October 2 or 3. Some may have also died at different times and had their bodies moved. Arnaud Bédat argued that Pilet probably died in Salvan and that his body was moved to Cheiry, as evidenced by the undated massacre video. He acknowledges that this is in contradiction to the official findings.) the bodies of those at Cheiry were discovered. He was declared to have died on October 5. Most of the dead in Cheiry were among the "Traitors" who had been murdered, except Pilet and Pfaehler, who were probably among the "Awakened". Pilet was likely one of the voluntary participants and orchestrators of the deaths, not those who were murdered: the Swiss police report on the Solar Temple said, "it is likely that Camille Pilet conducted the ceremony on the night of the tragedy in Cheiry." However, Pilet was ultimately legally declared a victim and not a perpetrator, so the cantons involved could not claim his assets.

For several days, investigators did not realize Pilet was among the dead, or Jouret or Di Mambro. Pilet was initially thought to have escaped the scene and to be hiding in Geneva, but within the week, Swiss authorities announced that he and the other high-ranking suspects were dead. His body was identified on October 11. Following his death, those that knew him expressed confusion about how he could have become involved in this situation; his friends considered it unimaginable and the discovery of his association with the OTS to be baffling. They did not know he was a member of the group until informed by newspapers. They said they would have "never expected" him to be in a cult, though they said it explained "why, for about two years, he'd been acting a little strange [...] we never knew where he was". They said he must have been "trapped" by it. The Swiss company Prestige Time, that had been planning to launch Pilet's watch brand, denied all involvement with the cult aspect.

Pilet was buried in La Côte-aux-Fées on 15 October. The funeral was held at a local church in neighboring Val-de-Travers. About 300 people attended his funeral, including several Piaget employees. The eulogy was delivered by a pastor and family friend; they read out some of the OTS's last messages explaining their deaths. The writers of a 1994 book covering Piaget's history, Montres et merveilles de Piaget, dedicated the book to Pilet.
