= François Bonlieu =

French alpine skier (1937–1973)

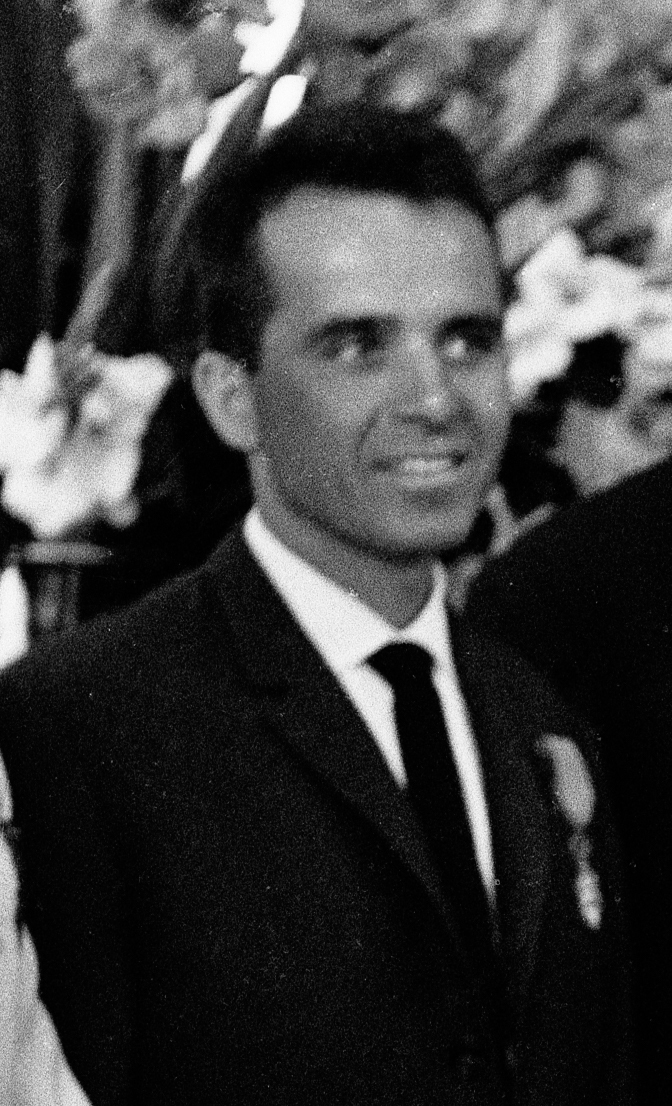
- Bonlieu, pictured in 1964

Personal information
- National team: France
- Born: François Pierre Philippe Bonlieu; 21 March 1937 Juvincourt-et-Damary, Aisne, France
- Died: 18 August 1973 (aged 36) Croisette, Cannes, France
- Height: 167 cm (5 ft 6 in)
- Weight: 60 kg (132 lb)
- Relative: Edith Bonlieu (sister)

Skiing career
- Sport: Alpine skiing
Medal record
Men's alpine skiing
Representing France
Olympic Games
Gold medal – first place	1964 Innsbruck	Giant slalom
World Championships
Gold medal – first place	1964 Innsbruck	Giant slalom
Silver medal – second place	1954 Åre	Giant slalom
Bronze medal – third place	1958 Bad Gastein	Giant slalom

François Pierre Philippe Bonlieu (21 March 1937 – 18 August 1973) was a French alpine skier. Bonlieu debuted for the French alpine skiing national team when he was 15 years old, and placed second in the Alpine World Ski Championships at the age of 17. His career was interrupted by his service in the Algerian War. He was a four time French Champion (twice in the giant slalom, once each in the slalom and Alpine combined), and won the gold medal in the 1964 Olympics in Innsbruck, Austria in the Giant slalom. Due to his short height, Bonlieu was often referred to as "the little prince" (French: Le Petite Prince).

Unlike other French skiers of the time, Bonlieu was not popular with the public and attracted little fame or celebrity. Known for his unusual and morose personality and remarks, he would often disappear for days on end. He often conflicted with and shocked his coaches and fellow skiers. He was murdered in 1973 in Cannes under unclear circumstances.

== Early life ==
François Pierre Philippe Bonlieu was born at Juvincourt-et-Damary, Aisne, on 21 March 1937. He experienced difficulty in childhood and was "virtually homeless". He had four siblings, two girls and two boys. He never knew his father. Following World War II, his mother moved to Contamines in the Alps.

He became interested in skiing at a young age while living in the Alps, and taught himself how to ski. His sister Edith Bonlieu was also an alpine skier. Edith married fellow Olympic skiing gold medalist Jean Vuarnet in 1958. Bonlieu lived with his sister and Vuarnet some of the time.

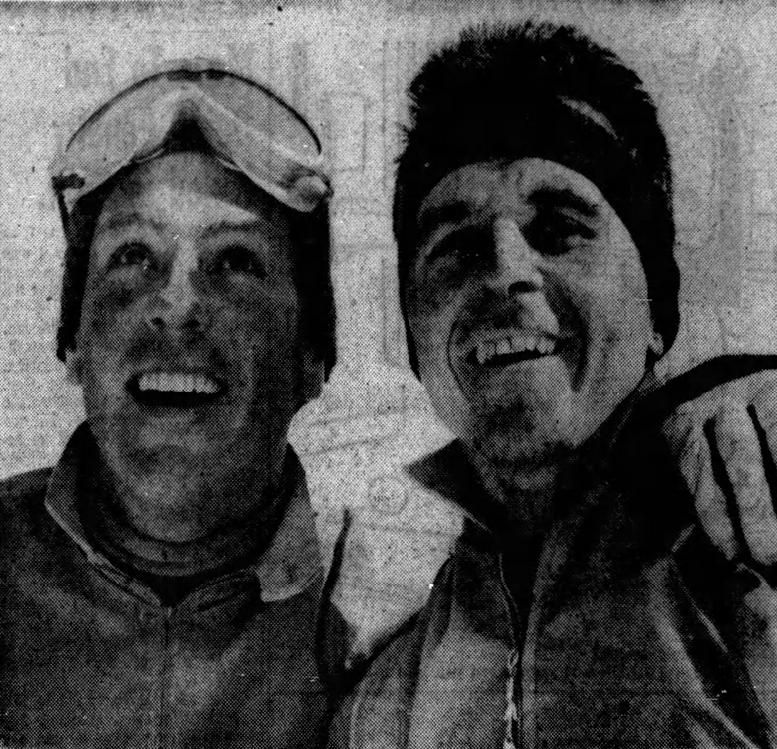
His brother-in-law Jean Vuarnet (left) hugging him after a win in 1960

== Career ==
Due to his short height, Bonlieu was often referred to as "the little prince" (French: Le Petite Prince). Bonlieu was known for his unusual, antisocial, and morose personality and remarks, which at times shocked his fellow skiers and coaches. Ski magazine called him "introspective", while fellow skier Dick Dorworth said he was a "special person in the ski world, but because he was strange and difficult to understand", and "not so much antisocial, as he was so often labeled, as un-social". He was further described as very individualistic and generally quite unhappy. Bonlieu once stated that he was only happy while skiing, which the people around him agreed with.

He was known to disappear for days on end. Unlike other French skiers of the time, Bonlieu was not popular with the public and garnered little fame or celebrity from his career. Given his personality, he was not considered marketable; Dorworth said he was "a hard man to sell. And buy." While not competing, he worked as a mountain climbing guide.

=== Early career ===
Bonlieu debuted for the French alpine skiing national team when he was 15 years old, after winning a youth cup. At the age of 17 he placed second in the Alpine World Ski Championships in Sweden in 1954. There was no public acknowledgement of his win; when he returned home, no one greeted him at the train station.

These early victories led to high expectations for his career. He garnered little success over the next decade, causing him personal difficulty. In 1956, he was on the French Olympic skiing team alongside his sister, but did not medal. He won the Kandahar slalom in 1959. The next few years his career was inactive as he served in the Algerian War, from which he returned both physically and mentally ill. Bonlieu was known to have health difficulties.

=== Later career ===
In 1960, he won the opening event of the American International Alpine ski race in the giant slalom in Mount Mansfield in the United States.

In 1964, he won the special slalom in Hindelang, beating out Billy Kidd and Bud Werner.

=== 1964 Winter Olympics ===
He competed in the 1964 Olympics in Innsbruck, Austria. Prior to the competition, he stated he was "sure he would win", and that "in eight days I will have erased 10 years of emptiness". He often conflicted with Honoré Bonnet, the coach of the French team. During the Olympics, Bonlieu again fought with coach Bonnet (as did several of the other skiers). Bonlieu privately said that he "declare[d] war" on Bonnet, which through an Austrian journalist made its way to the headlines of a Paris newspaper. Initially the quietest member of the team, he eventually yelled at Bonnet to be absolutely silent when he started skiing.

Come the Olympics, Bonlieu won a gold medal in the giant slalom. He placed a time of 1:46.71, beating out Karl Schranz and Josef Stiegler, both of Austria. He entered some of the gates unusually to make up time, including one which he entered backwards. After his win, he was carried around the arrival circle by his supporters; he stated that he had been "waiting for this for 10 years." Bonlieu also said that he had won because he had "always done the opposite of what Bonnet told me". This resulted in criticism from fellow French skiers Marielle Goitschel and Christine Goitschel, who called his comments disgusting.

Following this, all the French medal winners in the Innsbruck Winter Olympics were invited to attend the 1964 Summer Olympics in Tokyo, Japan. To the chagrin of his former teammate and then-roommate Léo Lacroix, Bonlieu did not attend any Olympic events while there, but bought a motorcycle and cruised the Japanese countryside for the entire period the Olympics ran.

== Later life ==
By 1970, he was no longer racing professionally, but still skied recreationally. He would walk around Chamoix while in his former skiing team uniform; people thought he seemed depressed at this time.

== Murder and legacy ==
On 18 August 1973, Bonlieu died at the age of 36 in Croisette in Cannes. He was found seriously injured on the night of the 16th in the basement of the Port Canto marina. Plans for a surgery were abandoned after his injury was assessed as too severe. Preliminary police inquiries were unable to determine if he had been attacked or had fallen by accident, and a full investigation was opened as a result. No one in Cannes knew him personally and no one knew how long he had been there. In 1982, fellow skier and writer Dick Dorworth of Ski magazine wrote that Bonlieu had "reportedly" been killed during a robbery, but thought that the true circumstances of his murder would remain mysterious.

In the same article, Dorworth concluded that "in the mind of a certain strain and time of skier, Bonlieu was without question the greatest free skier of all time." After his death, his sister Edith later joined the Order of the Solar Temple, a religious group often described as a cult, and died in their 1995 mass suicide.
