= Crois et meurs dans l'Ordre du temple solaire =

1996 book by Hermann Delorme

- Cover of the first Canadian edition
- Author: Hermann Delorme
- Language: French
- Subject: Order of the Solar Temple
- Published: Éditions de la Paix (Canada) Editions Favre (Switzerland)
- Publication date: 9 October 1996
- Media type: Print (paperback)
- Pages: 262
- ISBN: 2-921255-43-X
- OCLC: 47182420
- Dewey Decimal: 299
- LC Class: BP605.O77 D45 1996

Crois et meurs dans l'Ordre du temple solaire (lit. 'Believe and Die in the Order of the Solar Temple') is a 1996 book by Hermann Delorme about his experiences in the Order of the Solar Temple. The Order of the Solar Temple (OTS) was a new religious movement and secret society, often described as a cult, notorious for committing several acts of mass murder–suicide throughout the 1990s; by the time of the book's publication, 69 people had died in these incidents. The book was first published in Canada on 9 October 1996 by Éditions de la Paix, and was published in Switzerland by Editions Favre the next month. The book's preface was written by Susan J. Palmer.

The book's author, Hermann Delorme, had joined the Solar Temple in 1990 and became a close associate of one of its leaders, Luc Jouret, before an arrest and resulting scandal in 1993; Delorme afterwards left. When the mass suicides occurred the next year, he was one of the only survivors to speak to the media. In the book, Delorme writes about his experiences in the Solar Temple and denounces cults, but says it was primarily his own fault rather than brainwashing. Alongside his own personal experiences, he also writes on his theories for what led to the murders of the group, including that the murders were tied to a Canadian schism in the OTS and that the second set of deaths was the result of a rearguard left behind by the Solar Temple's leader.

Crois et meurs dans l'Ordre du temple solaire received largely positive reviews upon release, including for its insights on the Canadian operations of the Solar Temple and the insights on the Solar Temple as a whole. Most other sources from that time had focused on its European activities. Additional praise was given to the personal elements, with several reviewers noting Delorme told the story as if he was telling it to a friend. One reviewer criticized the book for treating the Solar Temple as comparable to more standard religions like Christianity and Islam, while another said it did not have many new revelations about the group. It was compared to other books on the OTS, including Les Chevaliers de la mort and Le 54e. Several months after its publication, a third Solar Temple mass suicide occurred in Canada, resulting in renewed attention to the book.

== Background ==
One of the Solar Temple's logos

The Order of the Solar Temple (French: Ordre du Temple solaire, OTS) was a new religious movement and secret society, often described as a cult, led by Joseph Di Mambro and Luc Jouret. Founded in 1984, it was a neo-Templar secret society with eclectic beliefs sourced from many different movements like Rosicrucianism, Theosophy, and the New Age. It was active in several Francophone countries. The main aim of the group was to get humanity back on the right path, as they believed the Knights Templar had sought to do before they were eliminated. There were about 500 members in the years before the mass suicides.

In October 1994, the Solar Temple committed several acts of mass suicide and murder in Salvan and Cheiry in Switzerland and in Quebec, which killed 53 members of the group. They called the deaths a "transit" and believed that through death their souls would transit to the star Sirius. In December of the next year, 16 more OTS members died in France in a similar fashion. At the time of the book's publication, 69 people had been killed in total. This resulted in international attention.

== Author ==
The author, Hermann Delorme (born c. 1948), was a former member of the Solar Temple from Quebec. Delorme is bilingual in English and French; he did translation work and taught English as a second language in Quebec. He was an insurance broker and had three children. He also had an interest in martial arts and archery. Delorme's first contact with the Solar Temple came in 1990, when, during his divorce, he met and became involved with a woman who was an adherent. While his relationship with her was short, he stayed with the Solar Temple after it ended. Delorme became close to Jouret and to Jouret's close associate Jean-Pierre Vinet. He said that, at the time, the Solar Temple gave his life meaning; in an interview, he described it as "an ego trip. The more you get involved the bigger ego you got [...] You assume you're getting to become part of a select group. The more select, the more isolated you get." When Jouret created ARCHS, a new part of the OTS, Delorme and Vinet were made leaders alongside Jouret.

In 1993, at the request of Vinet, Delorme attempted to buy guns with silencers, illegal in Canada, for the Solar Temple. Delorme said Jouret told him they needed the guns for target shooting and that the silencers were needed as not to disturb their neighbors. At this time, the Sûreté du Québec was investigating the Solar Temple, believing them to be tied to a potential terrorist group. The person Delorme approached to buy the weapons, an associate in a martial arts class, turned out to be a police double agent. In March 1993, Delorme was arrested for attempting to purchase three semi-automatic pistols with silencers. Warrants were also issued for the arrest of Vinet and Jouret.

This gun scandal made the news and drew large amounts of public attention to the OTS for the first time. Commentators accused the OTS of being a cult in the aftermath. However, come the trial, all three men pleaded guilty and received suspended sentences and a light fine. During the investigation, the police played Delorme an audiotape of telephone conversations between Vinet and Jouret. As a result, Delorme came to believe that he was being used. He then severed ties with the Solar Temple and with Jouret. The firearms scandal contributed to the paranoia of the group's leaders, and the idea of "transit" was spoken of more afterwards.

After the mass murders and suicides, Delorme spoke of his experiences in several interviews, documentaries, and news articles in several countries. He was one of only a few former members of the group to speak publicly about his experiences. He said he did not entirely regret his time in the OTS, but that he would not do it again. He later expressed disgust with the media's treatment of the Solar Temple affair and how they had treated him. Several years after the book's publication, in 2004, Delorme was living a quiet life in Quebec, where he imported and exported luxury French knives. He said he had few emotions on the subject of the OTS anymore, "just memories". He further added that: "My experience was positive. I've gained a better understanding of why people seek out this kind of community. Everyone needs a base to work from. It's attractive to people. It fills a need. When people are fragile, they need answers."

== Contents ==
The book opens with an introduction from Canadian sociologist Susan J. Palmer, who writes that Delorme dispels the myths of the Solar Temple and notes that he is one of the few Solar Temple survivors to speak of the events. She praises Delorme's courage in writing on his experiences, something few survivors had done, and his theory on what led to the deaths, and his admittance of his own faults as well as that of the OTS.

The book's main section begins with Delorme's arrest as part of the gun scandal. It also recounts the infiltration of OTS members into several prominent Canadian companies, including Molson Brewery and Hydro-Québec. Despite Jouret and Delorme's manipulation of him, he says that he cannot manage to hate either of them. Delorme recounts his devotion to and worship of Jouret, calling him the single most important figure in the Solar Temple, rather than Di Mambro, who he does not remember as similarly charismatic. He believed for some time that Jouret was in contact with aliens. He says the roots of the suicides were in Jouret's immense stubbornness, commenting that "death was the only meaning he could give to his life!" It recounts Delorme's experiences in the OTS, the conflict he experienced, what led to him eventually leaving, and the "redemptive value of the OTS tragedy". He warns about the dangers of cults and attributes their appeal to a lack of warmth in an individualistic society, so people naturally look elsewhere. Rather than try to destroy cults, he says it is best to inform and spread awareness. He notes the very high rate of adolescent suicide as evidence of this issue.

According to Delorme, the second set of Solar Temple mass murder–suicides are due to Jouret and Di Mambro appointing Jean-Pierre Lardanchet and André Friedli as "watchdogs" and a rearguard to act on their instruction. If former OTS members were to try to remake the group, Lardanchet and Friedli were to kill them. When a few former Solar Temple members did try to reconstitute the OTS, Friedli and Lardanchet acted on Jouret and Di Mambro's instructions, murdering all the others before killing themselves. This chapter was added later, after most of the manuscript was written. He says there will probably not be any more Solar Temple suicides but does not rule it out completely, writing that it may be that "some followers, resolutely stubborn, have not yet understood how dangerous it is to continue the Order's group activities. Has another rearguard been planned to ensure that the OTS does not rise from its ashes once again?"

Delorme argues the mass suicides were first planned earlier, in 1992. The highest-ranking members were to "return to Sirius" and kill themselves, while the low-ranking members were to return to normal society. Delorme believes the decision was reached in mid-1992. He claims that the killings were planned for 1993 to take place simultaneously in Quebec and Europe but were delayed due to an internal conflict between Jouret and Robert Falardeau. Falardeau was the leader of the Solar Temple in Quebec and his portion of the group was in opposition to Jouret. According to Delorme, Falardeau's group refused the mass suicide plans and so sabotaged the rest of the order; since the plan was compromised by Falardeau, the rest of the Solar Templars decided those that refused to comply with the mass suicide plan were to be murdered. The same went for the Swiss and French followers who refused to willingly die. Delorme argues that had that not happened, there would have only been 15 or so suicides and none of the murders. He considers all those who died in Salvan to be suicide and some of those in Cheiry, the rest murder.

He says he has since come to believe that the biggest problem of many people in the OTS, including himself, was ego and taking themselves too seriously. He writes that though Vinet and Jouret were especially afflicted in this regard, it was prevalent among those in the group, "so much so that I came to believe that any esoteric or initiatory approach is first and foremost the Way of the Ego." Delorme is critical of himself and considers that he is largely responsible for his time in the order and its mistakes and that brainwashing did not play a large role. He says of himself and his role that:

Nobody put a gun to my head to force me to join the OTS. I could have easily written that the people in the OTS manipulated me, enslaved me, brainwashed me, indoctrinated me. That’s in part true, the smallest part. The other part, the biggest part, came from myself.

Delorme writes that while he still does not know what the meaning of life is, he has tried to deprogram himself of what he had been taught by the OTS and to return to normal life.

The book also contains several internal OTS documents and photos that had not been previously published.

== Publication history ==
The book was first published in Canada on 9 October 1996 by the Saint-Alphonse-de-Granby-based publisher Éditions de la Paix. This edition was 262 pages long. Delorme started writing the book at the suggestion of Jean-Paul Tessier, the publisher. He said the intention was largely to explore his own experiences but said the work would "debunk a lot of myths" about the Solar Temple, as contrary to some popular theories, "there were no drugs, no money, no arms trafficking, no mafia".

In Canada, the book sold 2000 copies in less than six weeks. After the publication of the book, Delorme attended local book events in Granby. Prior to its publication on 5 September, he was hosted for a talk by the Association des auteurs des Cantons de l'Est. After its publication, it received several co-publishing offers from other countries; initially contact was made with the Swiss publisher Editions Favre, though Tessier wished for larger publishers like Bernard Fixot or Éditions Robert Laffont, to distribute the book in other counties. It was considered that the Toronto publishing house Stoddart Publishing translate it into English. In November 1996, the book was published in Lausanne, Switzerland by Favre who also distributed it to other European countries. This edition has 191 pages.

Several months after the book's release, in March 1997, a third OTS suicide occurred in Quebec, killing five people. This resulted in renewed attention to the book. Those who died were people who Delorme knew personally; unlike in prior cases, their three children were spared, to which Delorme expressed relief. He afterwards remarked that he was not surprised or upset by the third set of deaths, though he had no explanation for it. He expressed worry that some of them had been murdered rather like in prior cases but said he was not worried for his safety. He said he found the whole thing stupid and wished for a time he no longer heard about the Solar Temple.

== Reception ==
Several reviewers praised the personal connection of the story, with some saying Delorme wrote as if to a friend, telling of the lessons he had learned from the whole affair. Pierre Kolb of La Liberté said it was told "a bit like a friend reunited after years" and said that though it was somewhat overdetailed this made it seem more plausible; Kolb said the book "shows to what extent the trap of pretense, bewitchment, and manipulation can close on anyone". The Canadian newspaper L'Écho de Frontenac praised the book, writing that though it was not the only book about the OTS, "[Delorme] approaches the drama of the OTS in its most human aspect without ever compromising those who, like him, did not have to make the great journey." They called it a good read and praised Delorme's admittance that he could not be sure about aspects of the situation.

It received praise from reviewers for its information on the Canadian operations of the Solar Temple, whereas most other works focused on the European side of things. Kolb said it gave a new look outside of the typical Di Mambro–Jouret duo presented by most, with the additionally significant involvement of Vinet and Falardeau covered; he noted Delorme portrays Jouret as the truly central figure of the affair, rather than Di Mambro as in other works. Kolb compared it to fellow OTS survivor Thierry Huguenin's memoir, Le 54e, calling both books works with "great warning value [that] includes the description of the manipulative practices that were common" to the OTS. In a review of books published about the OTS, Canadian journalist Éric Clément said the book was most interesting due to Delorme's substantial role in the affair, being the person who had led to the gun scandal that had gotten police attention on the Solar Temple in the first place.

Roger Juillerat and Bruno Montpetit of the Swiss newspaper Le Matin praised the book, saying it had substantial new revelations on the case and that its theories had valid evidence. Jean-Noël Cuénod of 24 heures was critical of Le Matin for saying the book had substantial new revelations. He argued it had little new information, and what was in the book had largely already been known. Cuénod commented the book was merely proof that there was "not much new under the Temple sun". He said its supposed revelation on the deaths having been planned in 1992 was not significant, and its theory about the second set of deaths had already been put forward as a hypothesis by investigators. Jean Vigneault, writing for Le Courrier de St-Hyacinthe, was more critical, saying the book was not in-depth and was, despite Delorme's research on many topics, vague. He attributed this to a lack of previous writing experience or a lack of processing for the traumatic events. Despite Delorme's denouncing of cults, Vigneault criticized what he saw as a conflation of the OTS and "great religions" like Christianity and Islam and said this and other writing choices showed that "the effects of the brainwashing practiced by the OTS take time to fade".

After the third mass suicide in Canada, the book was discussed again by several outlets, with questions about the OTS on the mind of several commentators. One reviewer for the Canadian newspaper Le Nouvelliste compared it to Les Chevaliers de la mort, another book on the Solar Temple, in the aftermath. The reviewer noted Crois et meurs as more of a personal account and more relevant to Canada, so said Quebec-based readers may prefer Delorme's book. The reviewer also pointed out Delorme's connection with two of the men who had died in the third mass suicide and its insights on the specifically Canadian operations of the OTS.
