= Fréchou =

- Commune
- Coat of arms
- Location of Fréchou
- Location within France Location within Nouvelle-Aquitaine
- Coordinates: 44°05′09″N 0°19′18″E
- Country: France
- Region: Nouvelle-Aquitaine
- Department: Lot-et-Garonne
- Arrondissement: Nérac
- Canton: L'Albret
- Intercommunality: Albret Communauté

Government
  - Mayor (2020–2026): André Apparitio
- Area^{1}: 11.97 km^{2} (4.62 sq mi)
- Elevation: 105 m (344 ft)
- Highest elevation: 142 m (466 ft)
- Lowest elevation: 52 m (171 ft)
- Population (2023): 220
  - Density: 18/km^{2} (48/sq mi)
- Time zone: UTC+01:00 (CET)
  - Summer (DST): UTC+02:00 (CEST)
- INSEE/Postal code: 47103 /47600
- ^{1} French Land Register data, which excludes lakes, ponds, glaciers > 1 km^{2} (0.386 sq mi or 247 acres) and river estuaries.

Fréchou (French pronunciation: [fʁeʃu]; Occitan: Lo Hrèisho) is a commune in the Lot-et-Garonne department in south-western France. The town is known for being the site of the alleged apparitions that led to the founding of the dissident Traditionalist Catholic schismatic sectarian group Fraternité Notre-Dame.

== See also ==
- Communes of the Lot-et-Garonne department
