= 1994 Solar Temple massacres =

Religious mass murder-suicide

- Location: Morin-Heights, Quebec, Canada; Cheiry and Granges-sur-Salvan, Switzerland
- Date: 30 September – 5 October 1994
- Attack type: Mass suicide, mass shooting
- Weapons: Smith & Wesson .22 LR pistol, poison
- Deaths: 53 (5 in Morin-Heights, 23 in Cheiry, 25 in Salvan)
- Motive: Spiritual travel to the star Sirius through death
- Coroner: Roger C. Michaud (in Canada)
- Judge: André Piller (in Switzerland)

From 30 September to 5 October 1994, 53 members and former members of the Order of the Solar Temple died in a series of mass murders and suicides in Morin-Heights, Quebec, Canada, and in Cheiry and Salvan in Switzerland. The Solar Temple, or OTS, was founded in 1984, active in several Francophone countries. The group was led by Joseph Di Mambro with Luc Jouret as a second in command. The group had a theological doctrine that by committing suicide, one would not die, but "transit". They conceptualized the transit as a ritual involving magic fire, where they would undergo a spiritual voyage to the star Sirius where they would live on.

Following several scandals and outside pressures the group faced, this idea became more prominent. They began to plan the "transit" and wrote a letter declaring their intents and purposes in the act, called The Testament. On 30 September 1994, the Dutoit family (former members) were ritualistically murdered in Morin-Heights, including their infant child, by members Joël Egger, Jerry Genoud, and Dominique Bellaton. Di Mambro held a grievance against the Dutoits for past betrayal and may have believed their child to be the antichrist. On the night of 2 to 3 October, 23 members in Cheiry in Switzerland, many of those considered "traitors" to the movement were killed via gunshot by Egger and Jouret. Twenty five members in Salvan died from poison injections.

The bodies in Switzerland were found on 5 October. In all, 53 people died, including several children. Both Jouret and Di Mambro died in the mass suicide in Salvan. Some of the deaths were genuine suicides, but others were murdered for betraying the movement. Many members had been lured into death with the promise that money they had given to the group would be returned to them. Others may have consented to being killed by other members, but it is not known how many agreed to die. The locations were then set on fire with an automated ignition system triggered by telephone. The investigation was criticized for some of its decisions, and several aspects spawned conspiracy theories.

The group was obscure prior to the deaths, but following the discovery of the bodies and the suicides it became notorious, resulting in a media frenzy. The events strengthened the anti-cult movement in Europe and abroad. Though the group's leaders died in the incident, mass suicides and murders of remaining members followed in 1995 in France and in Canada in 1997.

== Background ==
The Order of the Solar Temple was a religious group active in several French-speaking countries, led by Joseph Di Mambro and Luc Jouret. Founded in 1984, it was a neo-Templar secret society with eclectic beliefs sourced from many different movements like Rosicrucianism, Theosophy, and the New Age. The group reached its peak of membership in January 1989, with 442 members. After the group faced internal and external scandals, it began to decline. The group was relatively unknown prior to these events.

Cheiry is a hamlet of about 280 people in the Canton of Fribourg, about 30 kilometres (19 mi) south of the Swiss city of Fribourg, while Granges-sur-Salvan is a resort town about 90 kilometres (56 mi) away from Cheiry in the Canton of Valais. Morin-Heights is a resort town near Montreal, Quebec, in the Laurentian Mountains, then with a population of 4,000. Jouret, Di Mambro, and Camille Pilet (a retired sales direct of the Piaget SA watch company) owned 3 villas in Granges-sur-Salvan, as well as a luxury condominium complex in Morin-Heights. The group owned a farm called La Rochette in Cheiry.

The "transit" concept was first introduced by Di Mambro in 1990 or 1991. It was to mean a voluntary departure of the members to another dimension in space, and they imagined the transit as a ritual involving magic fire, where they would undergo a spiritual voyage to the star Sirius. He told the members that they would be summoned on short notice, and would need to always be ready, as this could occur any day. Beginning in the late 1980s, several members began to doubt Di Mambro, with several scandals and issues disrupting its membership. In March 1993, Jouret and several other members became embroiled in a gun scandal. Following the gun scandal, Jouret became very paranoid and concerned with purported injustice. He began speaking of the transit concept previously established by Di Mambro.

Di Mambro believed his daughter Emmanuelle, the "cosmic child", to be under threat from the antichrist. He reportedly believed the antichrist was born to Antonio "Tony" and Suzanne "Nickie" Dutoit, though this interpretation has been disputed. Tony Dutoit, a Swiss citizen, was formerly very close to Di Mambro, to the point where he was considered his adopted son. Tony Dutoit was in charge of the ceremonial special effects secretly staged by the group. After 1991, he distanced himself and had threatened to reveal that the effects were fake. His wife Nicky Dutoit had been for some time responsible for educating Di Mambro's daughter. Di Mambro had previously forbidden Nicky from having children following a miscarriage, but after she left the group, she and Antonio had a son, who they named Christopher Emmanuel. The Dutoits had invited Di Mambro to be the godfather of this child, but this deeply offended him. Di Mambro was disturbed by the name similarity ('Emanuelle' versus 'Christopher Emmanuel') , the disobeying of his instructions, and that he had not been consulted in the naming of the infant.

== Planning ==
Di Mambro and Jouret's original plan seemed to have been a mass suicide in early 1993; following Jouret's arrest that year, plans for a "transit" were found on his computer by the police. However, due to the esoteric language, the police failed to understand what the documents meant. This original transit was intended to take place at a luxury house in the village of Saint-Sauveur in the Laurentians in Canada, where the OTS had an underground ceremonial crypt. After the police raid Di Mambro ordered OTS members to destroy the crypt and empty the house, viewing it as having been ruined by the intrusion; the transit plans were then postponed and moved to Switzerland. An agent of the Sûreté du Québec (SQ) claimed that if this had gone according to plan there may have been anywhere from 60 to 80 dead. According to another interpretation, however, this may have only sped up their plans.

Di Mambro, according to former members, felt cornered; he was sick, with financial issues, and worried that his lies would be uncovered. In a tape likely dating to early 1994, Jouret and Di Mambro discussed the Waco siege, saying that the Branch Davidians had "beaten us to the punch", with Di Mambro telling Jouret that "what we'll do will be even more spectacular". In another tape from early 1994, Di Mambro stated:

We are rejected by the whole world. First by the people, the people can no longer withstand us. And our Earth, fortunately she rejects us. How would we leave [otherwise]? We also reject this planet. We wait for the day we can leave ... life for me is intolerable, intolerable, I can’t go on. So think about the dynamic that will get us to go elsewhere.

Prior to the deaths, many members made comments seen as concerning by those around them: in July 1994 Jean-Pierre Vinet told Hermann Delorme, who had left the OTS by that point, that "I’m leaving definitely [...] You probably will never see me again. You don't have anything left to accomplish, but I do." Another told a relative that one day the members would depart to Venus, and that when they went there was no reason to be sad. Another member gave her daughter a will, telling her that "one never knows what might happen".

=== Preparations ===
To prepare for the transit, specific missions were given to the most faithful members. Towards the end of August, the Genouds left Switzerland and went to Canada; prior to this, Colette closed her bank account. They then bought the equipment that would be used in the Morin Heights ignition system. Bellaton arrived in Canada on 17 September. Di Mambro ordered two group members, Jerry Genoud and Joël Egger, to kill the Dutoit child.

Egger, a former rock musician, had an adolescence full of problems, with a past of drug addiction and his father dying by suicide. When he met Jouret, he "[became] his God"; he was described as "completely under the spell" of the leaders. He was the group's handyman and occasionally Di Mambro's driver. A former member described him as "a petty criminal, willful, very easy to subjugate, very fanatical but without any spiritual scope". Genoud was loyal to Jouret, having been a member of the Golden Way since 1979. According to the SQ, they found a written ritual procedure outlining how the baby had to be killed. The drugs were acquired as well, stored in a cupboard, with Jouret writing a note on what drugs to use; he noted that children could be more resistant, so the dose of sedatives must be doubled.

During the last meeting of the order, On 24 September 1994, the group was renamed as the Alliance Rose Croix (ARC), announced by Tabachnik. The group claimed the renaming was in order to reach "the irreversible stage of the return to the Father" and the "Vth Reign", which would lead to the abolition of hierarchies. The group was told that the end was near and that the planets were in formation for Solomon's Leap, and that now they must prepare. Everyone who witnessed this ceremony would die in the mass suicide, barring Patrick Vuarnet, Jean Vuarnet's son. Vuarnet, when interviewed by police, claimed that while he had actually been shown a "testament from the Rosy-Cross" on video cassette during the Avignon meeting, he had not noticed any difference with the other messages since it was always about the world ending, and that they had not seen the full thing; in this video, the "transit" is discussed with little ambiguity. Vuarnet died in the next mass suicide of the group in the Vercors in 1995.

On the 29th, many of the most faithful members gathered in Cheiry, apparently understanding what was to come. Patrick Vuarnet said that while he was not included, his mother Edith Vuarnet had attended and she described it as wonderful. One member, Joël Egger, was not included, as he was flying to Canada to execute a "mission" (to kill the Dutoits). Upon arriving in Canada, he met with Dominique Bellaton and Collette and Jerry Genoud in a chalet owned by Di Mambro in Morin-Heights. On 30 September, Di Mambro had a meal with some followers near Montreux in Switzerland; according to an attendee (Vuarnet) Di Mambro had asked him to meet them, including Jouret and Pilet. They were joined shortly after by Daniel Jaton, who went off to speak with Jouret. The only two people besides Vuarnet at this meeting who did not die in the 1994 incident were Jean-Pierre Lardanchet and Patrick Rostan. Both of them died in the following 1995 transit.

The next day, Jouret was in Salvan, where records and eyewitness testimony place him on the phone, and was seen late in the day at a restaurant with others. Several members were lured with the promise that they would get their money back. Di Mambro's son, Elie, told his coworkers that he was going to visit his father; he had previously been ideologically influenced by his father, but publicly expressed doubts and informed other members about the money issues, after which he was declared an enemy, but according to his sister still loved his father. Albert Giacobino and his friend Marie-Lou Rebaudo also went to Cheiry, on the promise that they would have money paid back to them. The same day, Daniel Jaton picked up his wife and children separately and brought them to Cheiry. At this time, Robert Falardeau (later to be killed as a "Traitor"), whom Jouret despised, was in Switzerland, having been called to sign papers with Di Mambro and get his money back, intending to return to Canada as soon as he could. He already booked a return flight, and had called his wife several times, seeming normal. His flight was delayed a single day; on 2 October, he called a friend and told them that "things are happening here" that he "[didn't] understand at all".

=== The letters ===
Di Mambro wrote four letters, known as The Testament, which contained messages of the order's beliefs. The four letters were titled "To All Those Who Can Still Understand the Voice of Wisdom ... We Address This Last Message", "The Rose+Croix", "Transit to the Future", and finally "To Lovers of Justice".

In these letters, the OTS termed the acts a "transit", which they described as "in no way a suicide in the human sense of the term". They declared that, upon death, they would acquire "solar bodies" on the star Sirius (though members also gave Jupiter or Venus as an alternative destination). One letter declared "We leave this Earth to rediscover, in complete lucidity and freedom, a Dimension of Truth and the Absolute, far from the hypocrisies and oppression of this world, with the end of producing the embryo of our future Generation." It encourages the members left behind to do the same thing, saying that they should also "transit". They also displayed a belief in the New World Order conspiracy theory, which they connected to the Order's supposed persecution.

These letters divided the dead into three groups.

- "Traitors", who were to be murdered
- "Immortals", who had been "helped" in death (killed) by other members
- "Awakened", who had committed voluntary suicide

The letters maintain a persecuted rhetoric, largely devoted to complaining about the treatment faced by Vinet and Jouret in Canada. In one letter, they harshly criticize the allegations the OTS had received in several countries (Australia, Switzerland, Martinique, Canada, and France) as "deceitful", but especially complain about the SQ and the Q-37 investigation. They blamed their wish to leave the earth on systematic government persecution (who they said were in league with Opus Dei and the Mafia). In the "To Lovers of Justice" letter, they compared their treatment to the Branch Davidians and the Waco siege, calling this a "particularly troubling coincidence". A letter also claimed a mass suicide had occurred in Sydney on 6 January 1994. According to the New South Wales Police, this did not occur. They say they may return one day, and that "The Rose+Croix has definitely not finished surprising you".

Patrick Vuarnet was instructed by Di Mambro to mail the Testament letters to roughly 300 people, including to the media, other followers and a number of political and public figures, including Charles Pasqua and Bill Clinton. This was to be done 5 October. These letters were also sent out to newspapers and the religious historian Jean-François Mayer. They were postmarked from "D.Part" and "Tran Sit Corp", mailed from "33 Golden Strasse, 8011 ZURICH". (Note: Allusions to various beliefs of the OTS. "Golden Strasse" refers to the Golden Way, 33 for the "33 Elder Brothers of the Rosicrucian Order". D. Part is a pun - "Depart". Zurich is where Di Mambro claimed to have met the "masters".) A fifth, shorter letter was also given to Vuarnet, printed in the same font as the others. This was also found in a search of Di Mambro's apartment, and read:

Following the tragic Cheiry Transit, we wish to make it clear, on behalf of the Rosy Cross, that we deplore and totally disassociate ourselves from the barbaric, incompetent and aberrant behavior of Doctor Luc Jouret. Taking the decision to act on his own authority, against all our rules, he has transgressed our code of honor and is the cause of a veritable carnage that should have been a Transit carried out in Honor, Peace and Light. His departure does not correspond to the Ethics we represent and defend to posterity.

== Deaths ==
=== Dutoit family murders ===
On 30 September 1994, at about 5 p.m. the Dutoits were lured to the chalet in Morin-Heights, having been invited to dinner by Bellaton. According to the sequence of events by investigators, upon entering the house someone, likely Bellaton, lured Tony Dutoit to the basement bathroom. Waiting behind the door were Egger and Genoud, who knocked him unconscious with several dozen hits to the head with a baseball bat. He struggled, but was stabbed repeatedly and died. As ordered by Di Mambro, these murders were carried out in a ritualistic fashion. Nicky was stabbed eight times in the back, four times in the throat, and once in each breast (each number of symbolic importance), while her husband was stabbed fifty times in the back. She, likely knowing what had happened to her husband, did not resist. Their child was stabbed six times, both with a knife and a wooden stake through the heart. The two adults died from multiple stab wounds and having their throats slit.

Bellaton and Egger left for Switzerland at 10:10 p.m. the same day, using the Dutoits' car to drive to the airport. The Genouds spent the next four days cleaning up the scene, removing the blood residue, and preparing for death. On 4 October they set incendiary timers to go off and, while wearing robes and medals, laid out on a bed. The Genouds ingested soporifics, before dying of asphyxiation from smoke inhalation when the fires began. They jammed chairs under the doorknobs to prevent responders reaching them to interrupt their suicides. The bodies of the Dutoits were hidden in a storage closet by the Genouds, wrapped in blankets and a carpet and hidden in a cellar alcove. Their child's body was found hidden behind a water heater, inside a plastic bag with the stake. Antonio's body was also found with a plastic bag over his head. According to telephone records, Di Mambro was informed of the success of the plan.

Those who died in the incident were:

- Antonio Dutoit, 36
- Suzanne Dutoit, 34
- Christopher Dutoit, 3 months
- Jerry Genoud, 39
- Colette Genoud, 63

=== Cheiry massacre ===
During the night from 2 to 3 October 1994, 23 died in Cheiry. Two victims, Albert Giacobino and Marie-Lou Rebaudo, were likely killed first, with Rebaudo being shot, the evidence showing she had tried to defend herself, and Giacobino being smothered. Their bodies were found far away from the others, indicating that someone may have tried to hide them. Some of the victims had died much earlier than the others, and following their deaths their bodies were moved. Some of the dead were shot more than three times in the head. Eight of the dead had plastic bags over their heads: this may have been done to burn their faces faster. 20 of the dead had been shot with one gun; 21 of them had died from gunshot wounds, previously drugged with sleeping pills, with another two dying of suffocation from plastic bags (Pilet and Pfaehler).

Several of the bodies in Cheiry showed signs of a struggle. 8 of the bodies in Cheiry were arranged in a circle shape, with the bodies radiating out like wheel spokes; all were wearing silk capes of white, black or gold. Some of the dead had their hands tied. The bodies were all located in a room beyond a corridor only accessible through a secret door, from a salon, itself hidden. This room was full of religious and esoteric symbolism, including a sword, crosses, chalices, and occult ritual items. Past that room was another smaller one, octagonal shaped with walls covered with mirrors, where 3 more bodies were located. In a room adjacent to this there was another body, which was by itself. The depot in the Cheiry crypt where the bodies were found had its doors held closed with a wire being put between the door handles and the frame. 52 spent shells were found in Cheiry.

In the hours before the deaths in Cheiry, Daniel Jaton repeatedly called Jouret, Di Mambro, and Egger on the phone, likely playing a significant role; under his body was found the same string used to tie two victims in Cheiry, and some of the substances used in the killings were found in his home. Victims had been killed with a Smith & Wesson .22 LR pistol, bought by Egger the previous year. Egger also set up the ignition system used to burn the building down. The ones who had killed the others in Cheiry were Egger and Jouret, though it is possible they were not the only ones. Following the deaths in Cheiry, Jouret was recorded as calling Di Mambro, possibly to inform him that it had been a success, and shortly after so did Egger. At about 6 a.m. Jouret left Cheiry for Salvan. At about 8 a.m., the Cheiry mailman witnessed a red Ford Fiesta, containing 3 or 4 young men, (Note: According to Bédat et al., the police suspected that these men had been Egger, Lardanchet, Rostan, and Vuarnet, but this was never proven and they were all (minus Egger) released after questioning. The investigation never concluded who these men were. Lardanchet, Rostan, and Vuarnet later died in the 1995 transit, which Lardanchet was one of the perpetrators of. As noted by Bédat et al. Lardanchet and Rostan's alibi is not possible.) coming from the farm and heading down to the village. Soon after, he saw the same men near the cemetery near a car that belonged to Colette Genoud, where they found her will.

=== Salvan massacre ===
At this time, Di Mambro was in Salvan; he, with several of the most faithful, were seen at a restaurant there on 3 October. They were noted to have an "absent and sad air" and barely ate. By this time Di Mambro may have already had his son Elie killed as a "traitor", the first death in Salvan: his body was found alone, off to the side from the others. On 4 October at 6:30 a.m, Joselyne Di Mambro called the wife of Robert Falardeau, who, sensing that something was wrong, asked where her husband was. Joselyne told her that her husband was with Michel Tabachnik and not to worry (in reality, at this time Tabachnik was conducting an orchestra in Denmark and her husband was already dead). At 10 a.m., Jouret was seen in a grocery store buying garbage bags of different sizes, later used to cover the heads of the dead. The fires in Morin-Heights were discovered by the police at 1:40 p.m. in Swiss time.

At 4 p.m., Jouret called a locksmith from the Les Roches de cristal chalet, pretending he had lost his keys. According to Thierry Huguenin, Jouret and Di Mambro had planned for there to be exactly 54 dead, in connection with 54 Templars who had been burned at the stake in the fourteenth century. This was to allow an immediate magic contact with these departed Templars. Huguenin had met with Di Mambro near Salvan that day, but became uncomfortable and sensed danger, smelling gasoline. When the locksmith arrived and the door opened, Huguenin fled the scene at the last minute, which left the death toll at only 53. Vuarnet arrived and was given the transit letters by Di Mambro: he later said he did not notice anything strange, except that several members had a strange expression, especially Egger, who he said "wasn't in his right mind". What happened after this is not known.

At 11:33 p.m., Di Mambro called Egger a final time, a 39-second call. Egger shortly after triggered the remote-control ignition system via telephone. From 11:42 p.m. to 12:12 a.m. he called the Cheiry farm three times, triggering the ignition system, before doing the same to the group's hideout in Aubignan and one of Di Mambro's apartments in Territet. However while many of the OTS properties had been rigged to burn, several of the ignition systems failed, and only the Cheiry farm and two chalets in Salvan burned. The fires were ignited with a sophisticated automatic ignition system, involving timers, phones, heating rods and plastic bags full of the chemicals gasoline and benzene.

25 were found dead in Granges-sur-Salvan. The bodies were spread around two of the chalets, while one was empty. Most of the bodies in Salvan were burned beyond recognition, and Jouret and Di Mambro's bodies had to be identified via dental records. The gun used in the Cheiry killings was found in Salvan. The dead had been injected with a curare, opioid and benzodiazepine-based poison. Among the opioids and benzodiazepines found were fentanyl, flunitrazepam, metoclopramide, and diazepam. According to the investigative report, it is likely that the fatal injections at Salvan were done by Line Lheureux (an anesthesiologist), with Annie Egger doing the same to the children. A note found on Di Mambro's body, written by him, declared: "Your Transit must be assured of total success, but that depends on you."

At some time during this period (investigators could never place exactly when) (Note: According to Bédat, the presence of the Ostiguys and Egger means it only could have happened on 1 October, before Cheiry, as after that Ostiguy died in Cheiry and Egger had only returned to Switzerland on 30 September.) the members in Salvan recorded a final video tape, later discovered by investigators, showing about a dozen of the followers in their last meal, including Jouret, Di Mambro, Pilet, the Eggers, and several others. During the tape, the members sing The Knights of the Round Table; in another part, Pilet tries and fails to contact the "Masters". The members then drink something and fall asleep. The film ends showing two of the children, before moving to Di Mambro's wife, all already dead. This may have indicated that the dead were killed prior and others were moved to Cheiry, though this point was never raised by investigators.

Those who died in the incident were:

Cheiry

- Françoise Belanger, 55
- Guy Berenger, 60
- Leopoldo Cabrera Gil, 39
- Robert Falardeau, 47
- Albert Giacobino, 72
- Jocelyne Grand'Maison, 44
- Daniel Jaton, 49
- Madeleine Jaton, 47
- Armelle Jaton, 16
- Lionel Jaton, 18
- Nicole Koymans, 66
- Robert Ostiguy, 50
- Françoise Ostiguy, 47
- Fabienne Paulus, 40
- Jean-Léon Paulus, 49
- Christian Pechot, 49
- Christine Pechot, 50
- Sébastien Pechot, 12
- Marie-Christine Pertue, 42
- Renée Pfaehler, 79
- Camille Pilet, 68
- Marie-Louise Rebaudo, 52
- Séverine Vullien, 23

Salvan

- Dominique Bellaton, 36
- Caroline Berenger, 4
- Madeline Berenger, 38
- Bernadette Bise, 58
- Carole Cadorette, 39
- Odile Dancet, 48
- Siegfried "Elie" Di Mambro, 25
- Emmanuelle Di Mambro, 12
- Joselyne Di Mambro, 45
- Joseph Di Mambro, 70
- Joël Egger, 35
- Annie Egger, 30
- Martin Germain, 54
- Cécile Germain, 53
- Luc Jouret, 47
- Josiane Kesseler, 43
- Pauline Lemonde, 56
- Jacques Levy, 37
- Annie Levy, 42
- Line Lheureux-Bod, 56
- Vanina Lheureux-Bod, 10
- Fabienne Noirjean, 35
- Maryse Severino, 46
- Aude Severino, 15
- Jean-Pierre Vinet, 55

Most of those killed in Salvan were long time members, including both Di Mambro and Jouret, as well as Di Mambro's wife, mistresses, and daughter Emmanuelle. Also killed was his son Elie, who had previously distanced himself from the group. Both the killers of the Dutoits, Joël Egger and Dominique Bellaton, also died in Salvan. Vinet, Cadorette, and Lemonde (all dying in Salvan) were considered among the "Awakened". The "Immortals" all died at Salvan; according to academics Shannon Clusel and Susan J. Palmer it is not known how many of them consented to death prior, and how many were simply murdered, but according to journalist Arnaud Bédat everyone at Salvan likely agreed to die, with the exception of Elie.

Many of the dead in Cheiry were among the "Traitors", except Pilet and Pfaehler, who were probably "Awakened"; also included among the "Traitors" were the Dutoits. Everyone in Cheiry was killed. Some of those who died in Cheiry were murdered for revenge, but others were still close to the group. Of the dead, seven were children, four of which were in Salvan and three in Cheiry. It is not known whether their parents all knowingly brought their children with them to die. There were 15 Awakened, 30 Immortals, and 8 Traitors.

The members, including the dead, were noted to be, relative to other cults, high status and influential individuals. They included Jocelyne Grand’Maison, one of the business correspondents of the Canadian newspaper Le Journal de Québec, Robert Ostiguy, a wealthy businessman and the mayor of Richelieu, Quebec, Guy Berenger, a nuclear engineer from France, and Robert Falardeau, who was an official for the Government of Quebec. Jean-Pierre Vinet had been an official at Hydro-Québec, the state-operated power utility of Quebec.

== Discovery ==
On 4 October 1994, the bodies of the Genouds were found in the burned out chalet; the next day the bodies of the Dutoits were found in the building's cellar. On 1 a.m. on 5 October, Swiss examining magistrate André Piller was called by the police to respond to a fire at Cheiry, arriving half an hour later. At the scene, firefighters attempted to save the house, while Piller and the responding police entered the nearby farmhouse; there, they found the body of Albert Giacobino with a plastic bag over his head, alongside an ignition system that had not gone off. They initially believed, upon discovering this, that it might be a suicide alongside the fire, but realized that the forensic evidence contradicted this. Continuing to search, they then found a hidden salon full of briefcases, in which they found papers mentioning the Order of the Solar Temple. At about 4 a.m., the investigators discovered the secret door within the salon, there finding the corridor that lead to the rooms with the bodies in them. Soon after this they heard news of the fire in Granges-sur-Salvan, of the three villas; when the fires there died down, they found the bodies in Salvan.

These two fires were connected when a car belonging to Egger, who lived in the Cheiry house, was found parked outside the Salvan commune. The next day, the Canadian police realized that there was likely a connection between the Morin-Heights fire and the Swiss ones as the properties were owned by the same men. The day the affair was discovered, Piller invited small groups of journalists to the Cheiry scene to take pictures. That day he promoted the theory of mass suicide, despite the forensic evidence that could indicate otherwise; two days later he announced that the secret sanctuary beneath the Cheiry compound would be destroyed, saying that this was in order to not "shock believers or attract the curious". It was viewed unnecessary to keep since there were, in his view, no outside perpetrators and no need to search. This fueled conspiracy theories.

== Investigation ==
Due to Swiss federalism and the different jurisdictions the OTS was active in, the case came under the jurisdiction of three cantons, and the investigation was headed by three different examining magistrates. Attempting to resolve this and centralize the investigation, they created a crisis unit entitled "Helios" to facilitate communicate between them, as well as the separate investigation in Canada. This was largely ineffective, with the three magistrates working largely independently while the investigators attempted to collaborate. In 1996, the 200 page Hélios report was submitted to the examining magistrates Piller, Jean-Pascal Jaquemet and Dumartheray, the summary of the investigation conducted by the cantonal police. It was partially released to the families of the dead, and was obtained by journalist Arnaud Bédat. The Canadian investigators later complained the Swiss investigators had "muzzled" them.

The investigation of the Canton of Valais, headed by Jean-Pascal Jacquemet, was less high-profile than Piller's; however, they did not investigate thoroughly, and left behind many items that journalists would later find. Several months after the deaths, two journalists from France 2 visited the ruins of the Salvan chalet and found, in the kitchen garbage can, audio cassettes in excellent condition, recording telephone conversations between followers who had been spied on by Di Mambro. Extracts from the tapes were later broadcast and deemed to be in line with the order's beliefs and theses. The leadership of the OTS cared deeply about the group's legacy, and spent a large amount of time preemptively creating a "legend" through both the manifestos they mailed to various media and scholarly sources, and by destroying all evidence that would have conflicted with their own story. This plan was disrupted, as some of the ignition devices had failed. This failure left behind a large number of the Temple's written documents, some of which were found on the group's surviving computers, as well as audio and video cassettes, able to be looked through by investigators. Thanks to the documents found, the police were able to understand the workings of the community and recognize some of its members, including Michel Tabachnik.

As the bodies were so badly burned, it was not immediately realized that several members, including several of the main people involved like Jouret, Di Mambro, Pilet, Egger, and Bellaton were among the dead, resulting in an international manhunt as the Swiss police suspected they had escaped. When their bodies were identified, this was called off and the police instead began looking for other sources. The final body identifications were completed a month after the deaths. The autopsies were handled by the University of Lausanne's Institute for Legal Medicine.

Despite some suspicions that Vuarnet, Lardanchet and Rostan were involved in the Cheiry transit (as the three men in the Ford Fiesta) they were released, and the police eventually concluded that there was no proof to establish that any of them had been at Cheiry. Vuarnet claimed that he had little memory of the day, while the two police officers claimed they had been with another OTS follower Ute Verona, and had driven to the TGV station. However the time range for this to have occurred is too short for the rest of their movement placements on that day.

There is some disagreement on the antichrist motivation as to the Dutoit killings, as promoted by the SQ. Huguenin contests the theory, saying that while the group did believe there was an antichrist, it was not the Dutoit child and was still alive. Louis-Marie Belanger was skeptical over the entire account, arguing the stake had been placed there after the fact. According to sociologists John R. Hall and Philip Schuyler, the SQ's account of this should be taken with a grain of salt as, due to their personal involvement in the investigation and the complaints the OTS had lodged against them in their "transit" note, they would naturally prefer a theological interpretation of motive. According to Hall and Schuyler the Dutoit deaths were more likely vengeance for Tony's betrayal of the group.

== Aftermath ==
On 6 October the OTS was officially banned in Quebec. Shortly after, the deaths were widely compared by the news media to both Jonestown and the more recent Waco siege. Due in part due to the difficulty of explaining many aspects of the OTS, conspiracy theories were common. As described by Susan J. Palmer in 1996, "false or unverifiable trails have been laid: secondhand testimonies are traded by journalists, ghost-written apostate memoirs are in progress and conspiracy theories abound". The news, while it was still not known that the leaders had died along with the other members, initially portrayed the deaths as financially motivated as a kind of gang, who had gathered massive amounts of money, until the leaders were revealed to have died with the rest. Early stories put forward the idea that they had 93 million dollars in their accounts, due to a mistaken statement by police, but it eventually came out that they had little money left in their accounts.

It was initially debated whether it was suicide or murder. In 1996, the Swiss magistrate investigating concluded that of the 53 deaths, only 15 could be confirmed as voluntary suicides. These 15 were the core "Awakened" members. It is not known for certain how many were actually voluntary. After the event, some other members declared their continued support for the group's ideas, and even regretted not having been chosen for the "transit". One former member told Piller that:

Listen. They all wanted the Transit, but they didn’t have the courage to go. I might not have had the courage either, and I would have been happy if someone had helped me. If it was necessary. Why not?

The bodies of the Genouds were never claimed by their families, being buried in December 1994 in a communal plot in Quebec. Mostly in an attempt to discourage devoted former members from visiting their graves, the location of the graves of Jouret and Di Mambro were not officially released, with authorities describing it as "top secret". As neither of their families came to claim their bodies, they were both cremated following their autopsies. According to the three journalists Arnaud Bédat, Gilles Bouleau, and Bernard Nicolas, who investigated the case, as the canton where the death occurred has jurisdiction in Switzerland, they were buried secretly under an unmarked slab in a cemetery in Sion, Switzerland.

In the wake of the deaths, fear of cults took hold of the French and Swiss populations. The group immediately became well known. Many scholarly theories have been advanced as to what led to the group's actions, though the exact cause is not agreed upon. Though the group's leaders died in the incident, two other mass suicides/murders of remaining members followed in 1995 in France and in Canada in 1997, following up on the transit letter's call to do so. Patrick Vuarnet, who had mailed the transit letters, died in the 1995 incident, as did Lardanchet and Rostan. A luxury chalet was built on top of the house in Salvan where the deaths occurred, which had been bought by a Dutch couple, 25 years later. In the total of OTS deaths, including the later incidents, 74 people died. Only one member was ever put on trial, Michel Tabachnik, following the 1995 deaths in the Vercors, but he was declared innocent in two separate trials.
