= Barbouzes =

Group of armed counterinsurgents in Algeria

The Barbouzes ("bearded ones", or "fake-beards") were a group of armed counterinsurgents formed to suppress the Organisation Armée Secrète (OAS) in Algeria from 1961 to 1962, when OAS militants defeated them. Working clandestinely and outside the legal parameters of the French Army and police, the Barbouzes used violent terrorist tactics in an attempt to defeat the OAS.

== Origins ==
In the summer of 1961, when Algiers was under regular terrorist attack from the anti-independence paramilitary organisation, the OAS, three supporters of General Charles de Gaulle met in Paris to discuss their plans for response. Jacques Dauer, Louis Joxe, and Raymond Schmittlein founded the Mouvement pour la communauté, established in 1959 (MPC, referred to as Mouvement pour la Coopération in Algiers), to support General de Gaulle's political ambitions in Algeria. It was agreed that the MPC's propaganda posters were no longer sufficient and that more drastic action was needed.

Lucien Bitterlin was chosen to be the director of the new agents. Bitterlin had been a member of the MPC since its foundation, and had been living in Algiers since 1960. Members were recruited from a wide array of French society; existing MPC supporters, former soldiers, and labourers made up the group of several hundred. The Barbouzes coordinated with the Police Judiciaire under Michel Hacq, whose team were named ‘Mission C’.

== The Barbouzes in Algeria ==
In 1961, French recruits began arriving in Algeria. Bitterlin was approached by a French military colonel who supplied him with weapons, gave him permission to breach curfew, and requested he “plastiquer several activist cafes in Algiers”. (to plastiquer was to use a form of plastic-based bomb to destroy local buildings, for which the Barbouzes became notorious). Soon, news of the Barbouzes had reached the press. Their membership and political activities, however, were strictly secret, since the French government could not admit knowledge of and involvement in an illegal terrorist group.

Because many OAS leaders had emerged from the French military and therefore had connections with the military and French Secret Service, the French army and police in Algeria were largely ill-equipped to counter their attacks. Covert operations were seen as a necessary, drastic means for de Gaulle; the Barbouzes were tasked with "infiltrating the OAS, disrupting its operations, and sometimes assassinating its leaders". Far from attempting to arrest OAS members and hand them over to the authorities, the agents were "mandated to kill".

The OAS claimed to have known about the presence of the Barbouzes, having become suspicious about the increasing numbers of MPC posters, the bombing of several OAS cafes, and the sudden arrival of large groups of foreign men into Algeria. As a result, the attacks were by no means one-sided; the OAS orchestrated various attacks on Barbouzes hideouts, including on New Year's Eve of 1961.

By the end of 1961, fighting between the Barbouzes and the OAS had escalated. French Prime Minister Michel Debré criticised their tactics, saying Algeria had already seen enough bloodshed.

== Fall of the Barbouzes ==
In 1962, the Barbouzes could no longer maintain their cover against the OAS. They were eventually wiped out as a result of two major attacks; one on their residence in early 1962, and the second on the Hotel Rajah in February, where the OAS had learned that the remaining Barbouzes were in hiding.

Their defeat was not seen as a great symbolic victory for the OAS; after all, the Barbouzes had succeeded in killing around 100 OAS members, and public opinion largely saw them as no more than a gang of hit men hired and paid for by the French government.

== Sources ==
- Crenshaw, Martha, ed. (2010). The Consequences of Counter-Terrorism. Russell Sage Foundation.
- Harrison, Alexander (1989). Challenging de Gaulle: The OAS and the Counterrevolution in Algeria, 1954–1962. Praeger Publishing.
- Hughes, Geraint (2010). "The Use of Undercover Military Units in Counter-Terrorist Operations: A Historical Analysis With Reference to Contemporary Anti-Terrorism". Small Wars and Insurgencies. 24 (1).
- Monneret, Jean (October 1998). "Les « Barbouzes » Contre L'OAS : Nouveau Regard". Guerre Mondiale et Conflits Contemporains (in French). 191. Presses Universitaires de France. JSTOR 25732521.
