= Luc Jouret =

Belgian homeopath (1947–1994)

- Photo of Jouret used to advertise a 1991 lecture
- Born: Luc Georges Marc Jean Jouret; 18 October 1947; Kikwit, Belgian Congo
- Died: 5 October 1994 (aged 46); Salvan, Valais, Switzerland
- Cause of death: Suicide
- Citizenship: Belgium; France; Canada
- Education: Université libre de Bruxelles
- Occupations: Doctor, homeopath
- Organization: Order of the Solar Temple
- Spouse: Marie-Christine Pertué (m. 1980–1985) Marie-France Paré (m. 1989–1991)
- Children: 2

Luc Georges Marc Jean Jouret (18 October 1947 – 5 October 1994) was a Belgian doctor and homeopath. Jouret founded the Order of the Solar Temple (OTS) with Joseph Di Mambro in 1984. He committed suicide in the Swiss village of Salvan on 5 October 1994 as part of a mass murder–suicide. While Di Mambro was the true leader of the group, Jouret was its outward image and primary recruiter.

Born in the Belgian Congo, Jouret received his doctorate in medicine from the Université libre de Bruxelles in 1974. After suffering a serious illness, Jouret lost faith in modern medicine; he began practicing homeopathy and other kinds of alternative medicine. He also served for some time in the Belgian Army and participated in the Battle of Kolwezi. He was known as an excellent public speaker, and gave lectures on alternative medicine alongside New Age topics. In 1981, he met Joseph Di Mambro while lecturing for his Golden Way Foundation, with whom he became close. At Di Mambro's direction Jouret took control of the neo-Templar Renewed Order of the Temple group following the death of its leader, Julien Origas; he was ousted shortly after. Di Mambro and Jouret then formed a schismatic group, the Order of the Solar Temple.

Jouret was the Solar Temple's public face, but in his role internal to the group, he was subservient to Di Mambro. Following stressors within the group, including Jouret's arrest for directing members to illegally buy silencers in Canada, he and Di Mambro became increasingly paranoid, and the group's ideological concept of travelling to another dimension would grow more prominent. They began to plot a mass murder–suicide which they called a "transit". Jouret, alongside Joël Egger, shot and killed 23 OTS members in Cheiry. Jouret then died of suicide by poisoning, alongside 24 other members of the Solar Temple in Salvan, Switzerland.

== Early life ==
Luc Georges Marc Jean Jouret was born on 18 October 1947 in Kikwit, in the Belgian Congo. He was the second son of Napoléon and Fernande Jouret (née Jeanmott), both Belgian. His father Napoléon Jouret had studied in Germanic languages and was a local government official in Belgium, while Fernande was a housewife. After the birth of Jouret's older brother in Belgium in 1946, Jouret's parents moved to the Belgian Congo, where they settled in Kikwit; at the time, the colonial administration of the territory needed more civil servants, and Napoléon took up a job in territorial administration.

Jouret was born a year later; he was a sickly child, suffering from rickets, pulmonary issues, whooping cough, as well as nutritional issues. Due to the lack of medical equipment and the climate in the Congo, his family returned to Belgium when he was 18 months old. By the age of three he had recovered under his mother's care, though he remained fragile in health. They returned to the Congo and settled in Matadi where a third son was born in 1951. Napoléon switched careers into teaching Germanic languages to Belgian children, both black and white, and the family moved to Luluabourg. In 1954, when Jouret was six, he fractured his skull after being hit by a cyclist. His family, fearing for his life, returned to Dour, Belgium for good. A fourth child, a daughter, was born two years later.

As a teenager Jouret, now in better health, began to excel at sports, particularly judo and climbing. He aimed to become a teacher in physical education. In 1966, he enrolled in the prestigious Université libre de Bruxelles with a scholarship; his brother, also a student there, described him as a "serious idealist" at the time, not interested in money. Following May 68, communism was popular at the school, and Jouret was an especially devoted communist. Napoléon Jouret, then a school administrative manager, was an avid secularist and progressive critic of Belgian society. He created an organization opposing Catholic influence in Wallonia, of which he was president. At home however he was disciplinarian and occasionally physically abusive. Jouret's older brother said that while he was not abused, he believed Jouret was. Jouret left home at about 21 years of age, under violent circumstances. A later patient of Jouret said that he had complained to him later in life of the lack of freedom and strictness of his upbringing.

== Homeopathy and esotericism ==
At the age of 20, Jouret began to experience severe pain and was diagnosed with coxarthrosis (hip osteoarthritis), a diagnosis unusual for someone his age. As a result of this he spent 14 months mostly immobilized in bed and subject to constant medical care, an event which he described as making him lose his faith in modern medicine. Faced with the reality that he would no longer be able to become an athlete as he had wanted, Jouret was distraught.

Visiting students discussed with Jouret homeopathy and alternative medicine, and he set up an appointment with a homeopath. Jouret's condition seemed to improve after a year, but he was still unable to achieve his previous aims, instead choosing to focus on medicine. As he could not regularly attend the classes due to his illness, he had to repeat the course, wasting two years of effort. Gradually Jouret's condition began to improve, which he attributed to homeopathy, and he received his medical degree. Jouret became interested in a variety of alternative medicine, including iridology, macrobiotics, and acupuncture in addition to homeopathy. Jouret also became interested in politics, particularly Maoism, and joined the Union of Communist Students. Interested in both China's history of traditional medicine and its communist politics, he decided to travel to China.

During his college years he joined the Walloon Communist Youth, which resulted in the police placing him under surveillance. He graduated with a doctorate in medicine from the Université libre de Bruxelles in 1974. Two years after graduation, in 1976, he joined the Belgian Army, saying it was "the best way to infiltrate the Army with Communist ideas", and became a paratrooper. While in the army he participated in the Battle of Kolwezi, a joint French and Belgian airborne operation which resulted in the liberation of hostages from the city of Kolwezi. For some time he practiced conventional medicine, before he began to practice homeopathy. (Note: Some sources say he discovered alternative medicine while travelling in India, but others say his interest in it started in college.) Following his time in the army, he began a formal study of homeopathy and qualified as a homeopathic practitioner in France. He travelled widely studying various forms of alternative and spiritual healing; it is known that he visited the Philippines in 1977, and he later stated he had visited China, Peru, and India.

=== First marriage and association with Di Mambro ===
In 1977, both Jouret and his female companion Marie-Christine Pertué, a French sophrologist four years his junior, became affiliated with the World Teacher Trust (WTT). The WTT, founded by Ekkirala Krishnamacharya, combined theosophical Master ideas with homeopathic ones. They both visited Krischnamacharya in India, and were important players in promoting the WTT in Europe (after meeting Di Mambro, Jouret disassociated from the WTT). In 1980, Jouret and Pertué married, which allowed Jouret to acquire French citizenship in 1982. He established a homeopathic practice, initially in Belgium, starting in the late 1970s. At the beginning of the 1980s he settled in Annemasse, France, not far from the Swiss border, and began to practice homeopathy there, where he was very successful.

Among the groups for which he lectured was the Golden Way Foundation, a New Age group in Geneva, Switzerland, and he became close friends with the foundation's leader, Joseph Di Mambro. They met in late 1980. Jouret was immediately a favorite of Di Mambro; he encouraged his ambitions and exempted him from a member's typical work. Soon after, he stopped contacting his family and largely abandoned his former friends. In one letter to a former friend, he wrote that he had "changed his life" and "had a lot of work to do" but that if he could he would see them again. According to a friend, Jouret deeply wished for other people to recognize him, which Di Mambro gave him (as well as money); in his view, Di Mambro had done to Jouret what he had done to everyone else. Moral standards that applied to normal members of the group, particularly around sex, were not applied to Jouret, and he was given large amounts of funds.

At the time he met Di Mambro, Jouret was having marital and personal problems. Pertué and Jouret had only recently gotten married, but they continually argued; Jouret aggravated Pertué's anorexic tendencies by policing her diet making sure she was vegetarian. About this time Pertué told Jouret that she was pregnant, to his elation. Jouret was extremely excited to be a father, and also saw fatherhood from an esoteric angle. Their son, Sébastien Jouret, was born in 1981. Sébastien was born with a serious congenital heart defect, and was taken to the intensive care unit at the Brussels University Hospital. He died four days later. Sébastien's funeral was conducted secretly with no one else invited; Jouret left highly specific requirements for the gravestone. A tornado later destroyed the cemetery his son was buried in, and the grave of Jouret's son was the only marker left standing, while heavier markers were swept away. Di Mambro told Jouret that this experience was sent to him from higher powers so that he could understand his mission on earth in the cemetery. He later expressed to his friends that he was reassured by the fact that his son had died "pure"; he told another that he was relieved his son was dead because had he lived his life would have been limited due to the defect. Jouret became depressed following the death of his son, and Pertué would not recover; she abandoned her life plans, refused to eat and also began to believe that the child was not actually Jouret's and was conceived without sexual intercourse.

== Order of the Solar Temple ==
Di Mambro arranged for Jouret to meet Julien Origas, the founder of the Renewed Order of the Temple (ORT), who Di Mambro was close to. Jouret joined ORT in 1981. Jouret and Origas became quite close, and Origas may have appointed Jouret to be his successor. In 1983, after the death of Origas, Di Mambro urged Jouret to take over ORT, and he became its new grand master the same year. Within the year Origas's daughter forced him out of the group over a dispute involving leadership and funds, resulting in a schism with half of ORT going with Jouret. Jouret then formed and lead a schismatic group of 30 ORT members, which opened branches in Martinique and Quebec. The same year, Michel Tabachnik was made president of the Golden Way Foundation.

Di Mambro forced Jouret to divorce Pertué, claiming they had a "cosmic incompatibility" and that she was "unworthy" of him. In a letter in 1983, Jouret told their friends he and Pertué had mutually decided on a divorce. In a ceremony, Pertué was "emptied" of her "spiritual content", and condemned to wander until the day she died; Jouret was advised not to contact her, however they did interact occasionally in the following years. Despite her harsh treatment by the group, she did not leave. Following their divorce, Pertué devoted herself to the group, developing anorexia, depression, and other mental health issues; Jouret, however, was told by Di Mambro that he was the reincarnation of Saint Bernard of Clairvaux – he viewed Jouret as too important for such a "mediocre wife". Pertué and Jouret officially divorced in 1985. However, she told her family that she would continue to live with him. Following separation from Pertué, Jouret engaged in numerous brief relationships with women, with whom he would often be physically and verbally violent towards. From one of these relationships he had a son born out of wedlock in late 1983, whom he acknowledged as his a year later.

In 1984, Jouret and Di Mambro formed the International Chivalric Order of the Solar Tradition in Geneva, which would later become the Order of the Solar Temple. Jouret was the outward image and primary recruiter for this organization, though Di Mambro was the actual leader. However, according to former member Thierry Huguenin, inside the order Jouret was simply like everyone else having a job to do; he was the "Grand Master", but Di Mambro was the "secret master" unknown to the public. In 1984, Jouret was ordained as a priest by Jean Laborie, a "self-proclaimed bishop" and dissident Roman Catholic. Laborie had been contacted by Jouret, asking him to be ordained. Laborie, appreciative of someone willing to follow in his footsteps, which was rare, agreed to this quickly. To make the ceremony more original, Jouret suggested they hold it in an actual chapel, which Laborie appreciated. Laborie still had some concerns, to which Jouret blatantly lied and suggested his motivation to become a priest was a desire to evangelize, and after becoming one said he would move to Africa to preach the word of Laborie's church. His actual motive was to obtain more power over the group, gaining the movement prestige. The ordination was done in the Castle of Auty in January 1984. Laborie also ordained Thierry Huguenin, another member alongside Jouret, and two other members.

=== Lecturing and conferences ===
By this time Jouret was traveling widely through French-speaking Europe, Eastern Canada and Martinique as an inspirational speaker. He traveled a wide conference and lecture circuit in hotels and universities in several countries. His specific presentations included ones titled: "Old Age: The Doorway to Eternal Youth", "Love and Biology", and "Christ, the Sphinx, and the New Man". Jouret was a popular lecturer to Francophone audiences in both North America and Europe, with one commentator describing him as "something of a phenomenon". His publications and lecture recordings were sold in several New Age bookstores and health food shops. He lectured to the public from a homeopathic and New Age persona, providing a path to the secret society beneath – usually, at least some who attended his lectures were interested. Jouret was known as an excellent speaker, and according to former member Hermann Delorme:

You start listening and by God, you know, you just all of a sudden feel so attracted to what he is saying. You talk about the universe, you talk about how man is made of four ingredients and how the stars are made of these same four ingredients. Then you go back to Egypt and Egyptology, and then somewhere along the line comes the possibility of extraterrestrials. And it goes on and it goes on like that. But the more you hear, the less you understand, and therefore, the more you want to know. You slowly get caught up in the web.

As part of a larger investigation into new religious movements in Switzerland in the late 80s, religious historian Jean-François Mayer attended one of his conferences. After the lecture, pamphlets were distributed and attendees were told that if they wished to know more they could file an application, where they were then invited to another lecture to learn more about the group. At this lecture, fewer than 10 people expressed interest and by several months later only one person out of the group had joined the OTS.

=== Apocalypse predictions ===
Jouret spent much time in Martinique, starting in 1984. The OTS had more than 100 members there, mostly inherited from ORT's branch. At the head of the Martinique branch was Pierre Celtan, who in his decision making would always refer to Jouret (himself always referring to Di Mambro); he was described as "seduced" by Jouret. Jouret began to give more Amenta Club conferences there, to hundreds of listeners, the wealthiest of whom were drawn into the group. While never publicly denigrating the beliefs of the Martinicans, knowing he had to take into account their beliefs in order to appeal to them, Jouret expressed his annoyance with the Martinicans to a friend, Claude Giron. He told Giron that while he tried to be comfortable with all the races, "it must be recognized that they have different abilities". Jouret was noted to act "haughty, distant, or frankly contemptuous" to black members of the Solar Temple in Martinique, while accepting the whites.

Within a few months, he convinced the members in Martinique that they needed a new sanctuary, which he invited them to contribute to buying. In 1986, he told the Martinicans that the island would sink into the ocean by the end of the year. The members were terrified, but Jouret gave them a solution, which was to move to the group's Canadian base, which he said would be protected due to it sitting upon a large granite plate with a strong magnetic field. Jouret predicted that Quebec would be spared from the apocalypse. He told the Martinican members that if they did not move to Quebec, they would die; 30 members took up this offer, selling their houses and leaving the spouses and children who did not want to go along. Jouret advised them to not pay taxes and borrow huge amounts of money, used to fund the new location in Quebec, as after they died it would not matter. After the new year rolled around and Martinique still existed, members wondered if he could have made a mistake. He assured them that it was merely a "remission", but that the apocalypse would soon come and it was more important than ever to maintain the location in Canada.

Following the 1988 Saguenay earthquake, the view held by Jouret and other Templars that Quebec would be a safe haven from the impending apocalypse was damaged, which was the main reason they had moved to Canada. Members of the Sacred Heart commune began to criticize his leadership and his predictions (viewing them as too specific). The farm was also not self-sustaining, and the commune was close to bankruptcy. The members of the Sacred Heart commune disliked Jouret, accusing him of a lack of financial transparency and sexual exploitation of women. He was viewed as a dictator by the Quebec members of the group, and was also not present often as he constantly traveled. There was a resulting power struggle between the Quebec and Swiss Templars. Canadian members began to question him, and Jouret was replaced as the Grand Master of the Sacred Heart commune by Robert Falardeau in about 1990. The Archedia clubs were dissolved in 1991, and at about the same time New Age bookstores in Europe began refusing to host Jouret and his conferences.

However, Jouret could still give conferences in Canada. Jouret founded a separate group, l’Académie de Recherche et Connaissance des Hautes Sciences or ARCHS (a pun on the "ark of survival"), taking several loyal members with him. Hermann Delorme was made president of ARCHS, but this was actually a ceremonial role with little meaning. His close friend Jean-Pierre Vinet, a vice president in the Hydro-Québec company, helped him transition to a different role, lecturing for management; several officials of Hydro-Québec then joined ARCHS. Jouret, having given up his profession as a homeopath to devote himself fully to the OTS, began lecturing on personal development at various companies, universities and banks, mainly in Quebec. Di Mambro, who had a dim view of these lectures as "disseminating the ideas and principles of the OTS to the public", began sabotaging the lectures. Jouret eventually abandoned his activities and became totally dependent on Di Mambro. He slowly became less prominent in the leadership role of the Solar Temple and quit its executive committee in January 1993.

=== Second marriage and affairs ===
On 1 April 1989, Jouret married his second wife, Marie-France Paré, a Canadian woman 12 years his junior. He was her third husband. Their wedding was held in Ottawa while the reception was held in the group's elaborate commune in Saint-Sauveur. They married in a civil ceremony, to which he invited Di Mambro and some of his relatives, who had not seen him in several years. They were shocked by the luxury, which they saw at odds with their simple upbringing, and found the wedding bizarre. Jouret claimed he was in love with her, but in reality the marriage was probably so he could acquire Canadian citizenship, which he did following their marriage.

Following their marriage Paré was his secretary, attaché and an officer of some of the OTS's companies. They did not live together at any point. During this marriage, he had numerous affairs with other women, and also a homosexual affair with Camille Pilet, the OTS's financer. Pilet was 21 years Jouret's senior. They met in 1981, when Jouret, as his doctor, treated him for a heart issue. Pilet, grateful for his recovery, became a follower and a friend. He was a very wealthy sales director for the Piaget watch company and several other watch companies, with a network of 40 million francs, and something of hypochondriac. He officially joined the OTS in 1987, and rose quickly within the group, which took much of his fortune. A former group member testified that by 1988, Jouret was "living off" of Pilet's money, as well as the donations of other people and various inheritances. He received several million francs from Pilet.

Beginning in early 1990, Arnaud Bédat said Jouret "fell in love" with Pilet, as testified by a former member, who said he was "very much in love with him". In 1990 Pilet told his mistress of over 25 years that he could no longer meet her, claiming this was because he wanted to take a spiritual path; in reality this was because he was with Jouret. Deeply ashamed of their relationship and blaming Pilet for it, Jouret publicly mistreated Pilet. Few people in the group knew they were having a sexual relationship, with one of them being Di Mambro. Jouret and Paré ultimately separated on 11 September 1991, and divorced after 20 months on 8 December 1991. She survived the OTS deaths and spoke of her shock following them. Jouret may have also had a relationship with Jean-Pierre Vinet, though this is less certain. Both Vinet and Pilet died in the mass murder-suicides, likely two of the willing participants and orchestrators.

=== Legal issues ===
Members in Martinique were beginning to be frustrated with Jouret, viewing him as a dictator who was controlling and intruded unnecessarily into their private lives. In 1990, Michel Branchi, a member of the Martinican Communist Party and correspondent for the Martinican branch of the anti-cult group ADFI, who happened to have a relative in the OTS, organized a meeting between the families of members and Jouret in order to "attack" him. Questioned by their relatives about, among other things, why couldn't they see their relatives and what the money was used for, Jouret refused to answer and invoked his rank in the group, wishing for respect. A relative of one member insulted him, and Branchi said that if he did not leave Martinique they would take the "necessary measures". At the same time, other Templar movements in Martinique were threatening his livelihood; he returned to Canada. This incident deeply affected the group. Jouret was terrified, and expressed to a friend that he had no choice but to leave in light of the threats he had received. He asked Giron to add to the group's survival kits iodine, to help them survive a nuclear explosion. Giron expressed to Jouret that his "trap" was "money and women". Every summer solstice Jouret sent all the members a message; in the message in 1991, Jouret instead sent an "indecipherable cosmic jumble", invoking a variety of esoteric elements.

In March 1993, two members of the OTS – Jean Pierre Vinet and Hermann Delorme – were arrested for attempting to purchase three semiautomatic guns with silencers, which are illegal in Canada; this came after Jouret had encouraged them to buy the weapons. A warrant for Jouret's arrest was issued, which could not be carried out as he was in Europe, and the Canadian press's attention was drawn to the OTS. He was caught on a police wiretap saying:

When I see the violence unleashed around me, around us. I'm talking about Jo and myself, for example, because we don't accept that we're part of a very specific figure at the end of time. [...] My God, what a circus. It's becoming terrible. We're living a crazy, crazy end... [...] If you only knew what you have to do to keep the machine going, you have no idea. Anyway, in short, we're coming to the end. [...] What a planet, my God, what the hell did we do to land on this shit.

Vinet and Delorme appeared in court on the charge of trafficking prohibited weapons on 30 June 1993. Jouret appeared 15 July, on the grounds of arms trafficking and conspiracy. He pleaded guilty, but obtained conditional discharge at his request, which kept his criminal record clean and allowed him to keep practicing medicine. The judge believed that the weapons purchases had been made in a "defensive context", and that the individuals involved had already been punished by the media coverage. Jouret and the other two men were given only a light and symbolic sentence after the crime: one year of unsupervised probation and a $1000 fine intended to be paid to the Red Cross. Jouret was silent during the trial, and immediately returned to Switzerland, having spent less than 24 hours in Quebec. In the aftermath the media took interest in the group; the Canadian press began to report, using information gained from police wiretaps, conversations between members of the OTS, which they described as a "doomsday cult".

Following the gun scandal, Jouret became very paranoid and concerned with purported injustice, as well as the legal investigation he faced in several countries. Delorme never spoke to him again after the incident, but Vinet told him that Jouret was "changed" and that he became a "tired, tired, tired, disappointed, disillusioned person". He began speaking of the "transit" concept previously established by Di Mambro. His physical condition began to deteriorate, and he did not sleep; instead, he spent the nights reading comic books. According to a former member, he constantly repeated that he was "sick of it" and that they had to "stop it". In June 1994, he called his mother and tell her that, if anything happened to him, to not worry, as he had already done a lot in his life. His mother was extremely worried about him due to his obsession with the apocalypse and his pessimistic outlook. The next month he called a former friend who had recently become slightly distanced from the group; Jouret begged him to meet up. According to this friend, Jouret was anxious and felt threatened, but would not say why.

== Mass suicide ==
Di Mambro wrote four letters, known as The Testament, which contained messages of the order's beliefs. In these letters, the OTS termed the acts a "transit", which they described as "in no way a suicide in the human sense of the term". They declared that, upon death, they would acquire "solar bodies" on the star Sirius (though members also gave Jupiter or Venus as an alternative destination). The letters maintain a persecuted rhetoric, largely devoted to complaining about the treatment faced by Vinet and Jouret in Canada. In one letter, they harshly criticize the allegations the OTS had received in several countries as "deceitful", but especially complain about the SQ and the Q-37 investigation.

On 30 September, Di Mambro had a meal with some followers near Montreux in Switzerland; according to an attendee (Vuarnet) Di Mambro had asked him to meet them, including Jouret and Pilet. They were joined shortly after by Daniel Jaton, who went off to speak with Jouret. The next day, Jouret was in Salvan, where records and eyewitness testimony place him on the phone, and was seen late in the day at a restaurant with others. During the night from 2 to 3 October 1994, 23 died in Cheiry, shot to death. The ones who had killed the others in Cheiry were Joël Egger and Jouret, though it is possible they were not the only ones. Following the deaths in Cheiry, Jouret was recorded as calling Di Mambro, possibly to inform him that it had been a success, and shortly after so did Egger. At about 6 a.m. Jouret left Cheiry for Salvan. Pertué had been invited to Cheiry; several of the dead in Cheiry had been killed as "traitors" to the movement. Hall and Schuyler noted she may have been killed for more "personal" reasons; she was killed with two bullets to the head.

In a final, fifth note, Jouret was blamed for the group's actions in Cheiry. A note was found in Di Mambro's chalet, which read:

Following the tragic Cheiry Transit, we wish to make it clear, on behalf of the Rosy Cross, that we deplore and totally disassociate ourselves from the barbaric, incompetent and aberrant behavior of Doctor Luc Jouret. Taking the decision to act on his own authority, against all our rules, he has transgressed our code of honor and is the cause of a veritable carnage that should have been a Transit carried out in Honor, Peace and Light. His departure does not correspond to the Ethics we represent and defend to posterity.

25 were found dead in Granges-sur-Salvan. Most of the bodies in Salvan were burned beyond recognition, and Jouret and Di Mambro's bodies had to be identified via dental records. The dead at Salvan had been injected with poison. According to the investigative report, it is likely that the fatal injections at Salvan were done by Line Lheureux. According to the coroner report, Jouret died of the drugs he ingested prior to the fire. His body was found in the second chalet in Salvan, having fallen on a beam from the intermediate floor.

Following the deaths, it was not immediately realized that Jouret was among the dead. The investigating judge issued a warrant for his arrest, but within a week it was found that he, along with all the main suspects in the deaths, were dead. Mostly in an attempt to discourage devoted former members from visiting their graves, the location of the graves of Jouret and Di Mambro were not officially released, with authorities describing it as "top secret". As neither of their families came to claim their bodies, they were both cremated following their autopsies. According to journalist Arnaud Bédat, who investigated the case, as the canton where the death occurred has jurisdiction in Switzerland, they were both buried secretly under an unmarked slab in a cemetery in Sion, Switzerland.

The Solar Temple disbanded after Di Mambro and Jouret's deaths, though in 1995 another group of 16 OTS members committed suicide and in 1997 five more followed, following the first group.

== Publications ==
- —— (1992). Médecine et conscience (in French). Louise Courteau. ISBN 2-89239-152-0. OCLC 26808052.
