= Saint-Pierre-de-Chérennes =

- Commune
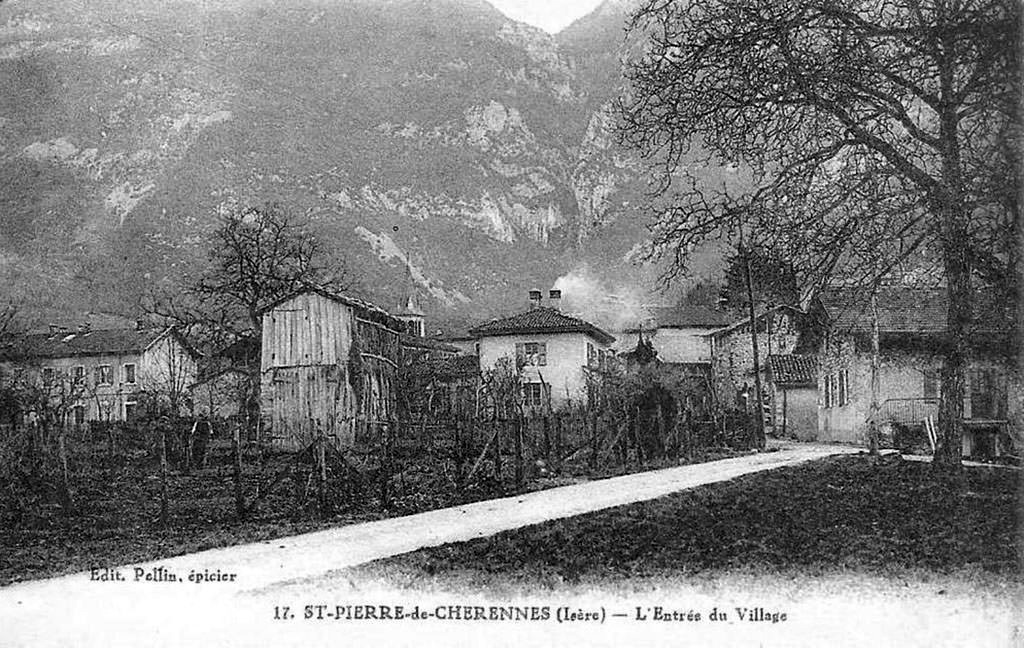
- Saint-Pierre-de-Chérennes at the start of the 20th century
- Location of Saint-Pierre-de-Chérennes
- Location within France Location within Auvergne-Rhône-Alpes
- Coordinates: 45°07′19″N 5°21′47″E
- Country: France
- Region: Auvergne-Rhône-Alpes
- Department: Isère
- Arrondissement: Grenoble
- Canton: Le Sud Grésivaudan

Government
  - Mayor (2020–2026): André Romey
- Area^{1}: 12.03 km^{2} (4.64 sq mi)
- Elevation: 303 m (994 ft)
- Highest elevation: 1,400 m (4,600 ft)
- Lowest elevation: 170 m (560 ft)
- Population (2023): 461
  - Density: 38.3/km^{2} (99.3/sq mi)
- Time zone: UTC+01:00 (CET)
  - Summer (DST): UTC+02:00 (CEST)
- INSEE/Postal code: 38443 /38160
- ^{1} French Land Register data, which excludes lakes, ponds, glaciers > 1 km^{2} (0.386 sq mi or 247 acres) and river estuaries.

Saint-Pierre-de-Chérennes (French pronunciation: [sɛ̃ pjɛʁ də ʃeʁɛn]) is a commune in the Isère department in southeastern France.

== Population ==
Historical population
Year	Pop.	±% p.a.
1968	200	—
1975	182	−1.34%
1982	235	+3.72%
1990	278	+2.12%
1999	355	+2.75%
2007	454	+3.12%
2012	486	+1.37%
2017	464	−0.92%
2023	461	−0.11%
Source: INSEE

== See also ==
- Communes of the Isère department
- Parc naturel régional du Vercors
