= Renewed Order of the Temple =

Neo-Templar group

- Ordre rénové du Temple
- Header from the ORT's periodical
- Abbreviation: ORT
- Classification: Neo-Templar; Rosicrucian
- Grand master: Julien Origas
- Language: French
- Headquarters: Auty, Tarn-et-Garonne
- Founder: Raymond Bernard
- Origin: 1970; France
- Separations: Order of the Solar Temple

The Renewed Order of the Temple (French: Ordre rénové du Temple), (Note: Some translate this as Renovated Order of the Temple.) abbreviated as ORT, was a neo-Templar revivalist order. The ORT was established in 1970 by Raymond Bernard at the suggestion of Julien Origas, both members of the Rosicrucian organization AMORC, which it initially had a relation to. It was also part of the Arginy movement of neo-Templar organizations, influenced by Jacques Breyer.

Bernard was the group's first president, but shortly after Origas succeeded Bernard, who stayed the secret grand master of the ORT. AMORC's leader grew worried about the ORT's increasing popularity threatening its international status, and Bernard left in 1972, leaving Origas the grand master. Origas, upon taking control, recreated the group's doctrine away from Rosicrucianism and incorporated aspects of the American religious organization "I AM" Activity. Origas was a former member of the Gestapo, and the affiliation of ORT with some far-right groups drew criticism.

Origas led the group until his death in 1983. He was succeeded by Luc Jouret, who was forced out by relatives of Origas in a dispute. The group then split in two, with one faction being led by Origas's widow and Gregorio Baccolini. This faction had 500 members as of 1997. The other, led by Jouret and his associate Joseph Di Mambro, became the Order of the Solar Temple; the Order of the Solar Temple would go on to commit several large scale mass murder-suicides throughout the 1990s.

== Background ==
AMORC is the largest contemporary Rosicrucian organization, structured into lodges which performed initiation rituals into specific degrees. Raymond Bernard was the legate of AMORC in the Francophone world and the second highest person in the organization's entire hierarchy. Julien Origas was also a member of AMORC; he had been involved with the Gestapo during World War II, for which he served three years in prison. Jacques Breyer initiated a resurgence of Templar groups, neo-Templarism, in France in 1952. This "Arginy renaissance" was tied to a claimed mystical experience in the Castle of Arginy, where Breyer said he had been initiated into a chain of succession stretching back to the initial Knights Templar. This resulted in the founding of the Sovereign Order of the Solar Temple (OSTS), which was formally created in 1966. Many of Breyer's ideas were apocalyptic, speaking of the end of the world and how to escape it. During the 1960s, both Bernard and Origas became affiliated with Breyer's Templar revivalist movement.

After this, Bernard decided that controlling a parallel neo-Templar order to AMORC would help keep AMORC members also desiring Templar initiation within the milieu of the organization. In 1968, Bernard initiated Origas and Robert Devaux (also an AMORC associate) as Knights Templar, at the Chartres Cathedral. The creation of this group was supposedly validated by a "White Cardinal" apparition that had appeared to Bernard in Rome, who initiated him as a Templar. This was published in a 1969 book by Bernard. Bernard later admitted that this apparition was purely fictional, along with several other of his claimed mystical sightings, but said all were based on "deeply moving personal mystical experiences".

== History ==
=== Founding and early years ===
In October 1970, Bernard incorporated the Renewed Order of the Temple (French: Ordre rénové du Temple, ORT) as an association at the suggestion of Origas. Initially, its headquarters were in Perdreauville, in a house owned by an AMORC member. Its founding board, legally, was Raymond Bernard and two others. Following the founding of ORT, Origas was crowned "King of Jerusalem" in a ceremony, using an actual crown. Bernard was the first president of the ORT, but a year later asked Origas to replace him as president. Origas accepted, but returned in a letter that this was only done with the understanding that Origas would be Bernard's "straw man". ORT was close to AMORC, and appealed to occultists who were interested in joining a neo-Templar order; it quickly became the largest neo-Templar group. It combined Templar and Rosicrucian concepts. It was invitation only, with an admission fee of 35 francs and an annual membership fee of 180.

In this period from 1971–72, the ORT grew to a membership of hundreds. The ORT was one of the first groups of its nature to use correspondence courses, which helped its membership increase. It utilized a double structure, where Bernard was the secret grand master and real leader, but with Origas as the formal president of the organization. This was done in order to keep the ORT subservient but also separate from AMORC, a structure which was accepted by AMORC Imperator Ralph M. Lewis in October 1972. They were endorsed in AMORC's official bulletin in 1970, who said they were the only legitimate Templar group. Lewis grew concerned over the ORT's increasing success negatively impacting AMORC's international performance, with Bernard leaving as a result. Origas would then become the actual grand master of the ORT. After he left, Bernard began discouraging AMORC members from joining the ORT, though kept up a good personal relationship with Origas.

=== Origas's leadership ===
Following Origas becoming the grand master, he altered the doctrine of the order, changing the doctrine to be instead based on the American religious movement "I AM" Activity. He became affiliated with a French splinter group of I AM created by Angela von Bast, the Saint Germain Foundation, but broke off with her in 1977, after which he affiliated with the parent organization of I AM. The group began to draw more concepts from Angela and from Breyer, revolving around messages given by the Ascended Masters of the Grand Lodge of Agartha and ideas about the end of the world. Origas led members of the far-right to join ORT, and had an affiliation with European white supremacist and neo-Nazi groups. The group as a whole later had involvement with the far-right, inviting members from the Internationale Noire far-right and receiving mail for neo-fascist Italian activists. This resulted in some resignations within the ORT.

The ORT had some ties to the Sovereign and Military Order of the Temple of Jerusalem (OSMTJ) led by Alfred Zappelli. The groups, though remaining separate, had some common activities; there may have been a secret order that brought together members of both organizations, which the other members did not know about. This group had ideas relating to an imminent apocalypse and ascended masters which walked the earth, among which they counted Origas and the leader of the Saint Germain Foundation, Angela. Members of the unified group would pray to both Origas and Angela, and believed both would be important figures in the apocalypse. Later ORT and the OSMTJ would have disagreements.

Origas was negatively portrayed by the French media, who criticized him for his affiliation with white supremacy and the far-right. These relations and connections to the Saint Germain Foundation, as well as SAC, led to him splitting from AMORC. Origas was also known to have a "difficult" personality, which led to several schisms within the order which formed several other organizations. Among these schismatic groups were the Fraternité johannite pour la résurgence templière (JFRT), Ordre des veilleurs du Temple (OVDT), and the Cercle du Temple et du Saint-Graal (CTSG). In spite of this, ORT and Breyer kept good relations and the group believed the Arginy Renaissance to be extremely important. Its main headquarters were located in the Château d'Auty in Auty, where Origas was stationed.

On 21 March 1981, the ORT and the OSTS convened in Geneva with a third organization, the Golden Way Foundation. The Golden Way Foundation was founded by one Joseph Di Mambro, and was recognized by Breyer as part of his Arginy movement. During this ceremony, the ORT and the OSTS renewed an allegiance to a "once and future" secret Master of the Temple with supremacy over both organizations (though this meeting did not represent a merger between the groups). The goal of this meeting was to establish "Templar unity". Present at this ceremony was Luc Jouret, a well known homeopath and member of the Golden Way Foundation who Di Mambro was close to. Origas was impressed by Jouret, and invited him to come to Auty with him and join ORT. Jouret was initiated into ORT, quickly rising into its leadership ranks. Jouret and Origas became quite close. He may have appointed Jouret to be his successor and the next grand master. Origas died 20 August 1983, and Jouret officiated his funeral.

== After Origas's death ==
Following his death, the ideas of the group would deviate further. Di Mambro urged Jouret to take over the order, and he became its new grand master in 1983. Jouret was initially accepted by the remaining ORT members as successor. However, he began introducing new and foreign concepts into ORT, inspired by Di Mambro's ideas. Origas's wife Germaine and daughter Catherine opposed him in his leadership of the group. Jouret was never consecrated as grand master, which was an important process to many esoteric groups, and he was not an officer in the legal aspects of the organization; as a reaction to his new ideas, Gregorio Baccolini, a Catholic Benedictine priest and the ORT Grand Prior, alongside Origas's family, used this to oust him in 1984. In 1984, ORT was identified as a "very dangerous" group in a publication by the CCMM, a French anti-cult group, with the publication connecting it to Jouret.

Following this, the group split into two. Jouret had no legal right to the ORT name, so he founded a splinter group in Geneva, Switzerland upon his ousting, alongside Di Mambro. In the schism, Jouret took many of the members with him. (Note: Chryssides says the majority went with Catherine, while Hall & Schuyler say the majority went with Jouret.) Jouret later claimed that this schism had been the will of the ascended masters, who had appeared to him two years prior and revealed to him a 13 year plan until the world ended. It was first called the ORT–Solar Tradition before being renamed the International Order of Chivalry Solar Tradition (OICST) and finally the Order of the Solar Temple (OTS). The OTS was dually schismatic and a direct continuation of the original ORT, with occult-apocalyptic teachings descended from that of Breyer and Origas, which it tied to other apocalyptic concepts, and some white supremacist ideas. After Jouret and Di Mambro consulted him, Breyer attempted to mediate the schism, suggesting the groups separate with goodwill, not seeing a problem with creating more Arginy organizations; however, he suggested that Jouret and Di Mambro's group transfer to Canada to spread the movement. Breyer's mediation did not work and the groups grew to dislike one another. ORT already had some Canadian administration in Trois-Rivières and Quebec City, which were led by Robert Falardeau.

The other branch of ORT continued, led by Origas's widow Germaine Origas and Baccolini. Germaine was interim president until 1987, after which they appointed a William M. as the president, with Germaine becoming the treasurer; the group did not have a grand master. Germaine became leader in 1992, with a table of nine members managing. Not being able to afford the management of the Auty Castle, it became headed in the Toulouse region of France, in Caussade, and mostly in Francophone Africa and Brazil. As of 1997 it had some 500 members. The OTS later became notorious for the mass murder-suicides committed by it in the 1990s, which killed most of its high ranking members. Following the OTS suicides, Germaine denounced the OTS and denied that the ORT was a cult, saying that they had "no connection with it", but admitted that Jouret had frequented the organization and said that he had tried to take over the group, after which they had ousted him. She said she was concerned that the "naive and fragile" members had stayed with him.
