= Raymond Bernard =

Raymond Bernard may refer to:

- Raymond Bernard (filmmaker) (1891–1977), French filmmaker
- Raymond Bernard (esotericist) (1923–2006), French esotericist and freemason
- Walter Siegmeister (1903–1965), also known as Raymond W. Bernard, American esotericist
