= Julien Origas =

French Rosicrucian (1920–1983)

- Undated photo of Origas
- Born: 27 March 1920; Breitenbach, Bas-Rhin, Alsace, France
- Died: 20 August 1983 (aged 63)
- Other name: Humbert de Frankenbourg
- Spouse: Germaine Origas

Julien Origas (27 March 1920 – 20 August 1983), sometimes known by his alias Humbert de Frankenbourg, (Note: Variously spelled. Hall and Schuyler spell it "Humbert de Frackembourgde" while Walliss spells it "Humbert de Frankembourgde", both quoting a 1984 letter by Martinique ADFI president Lucien Zécler, itself citing a 1984 anti-cult publication that connected Origas to Jouret. Bédat et al. spell it "Humbert de Frankenburg". Caillet spells it "Humbert de Frankenbourg", which was the spelling used in actual letters by Origas.) was a French Rosicrucian. In his 20s, he was sentenced to prison by the French government for collaborating with the Nazi occupation, for which he received several years in prison, though he was amnestied after serving two. Following his release from prison, he became interested in esotericism, and joined AMORC, a large Rosicrucian organization.

He later split from the organization following criticism over ties Origas had with neo-Nazi groups and ideas, and other more controversial occult organizations. Alongside Raymond Bernard, another French esotericist, he founded the Renewed Order of the Temple, a neo-Templar order close to AMORC; after Bernard left the organization he was the sole leader. The group became increasingly apocalyptic following its independence from AMORC.

== Early life ==
Julien Origas was born 27 March 1920. He was of Alsatian origin, born in Breitenbach, Bas-Rhin, in France. He was an office worker in the factories of the Matford manufacturing company in Strasbourg. During World War II, the workers of the company evacuated to Bordeaux, where Origas went as well, before he became a driver and interpreter for the Nazi Organisation Todt in Rochefort during the occupation.

During the German occupation, Origas worked for the Gestapo, the specifics of the position and why are disputed. His family alleged he had used his position in the Organisation Todt to help Jews and resistance fighters escape. This led to his arrest by his superiors in 1943; according to this story he was given two choices, either be deported to the Guernsey concentration camp or be incorporated into the Gestapo, of which he chose the latter. He was moved to Brest the next year, where he served in the Gestapo under Georg Roeder. A posthumous anti-cult publication said he had been the "former head of the Gestapo at Brest". These later narratives were sensationalist and in the context of the Solar Temple, and claimed he was the leader of the whole Brest Gestapo. According to occultism scholar Serge Caillet, Origas had been a language interpreter for the Gestapo, and possibly a minor official.

He was ambushed by Breton resistance fighters and was wounded, before being picked up by fleeing Germans. Origas escaped and hid with the aid of friends in Alsace, but in 1947 was charged and convicted for collaboration with the enemy. He was sentenced to four years in prison by the Military Tribunal of Rennes for collaboration the next year, but was amnestied in 1950 after serving only 3.

== Esotericism ==
Origas joined AMORC in the period of 1951–1952, shortly following his release from prison; this was in a period where AMORC was regaining power in France. He was married to Germaine Origas, also a member of AMORC. He participated in many occult orders, including the French Saint Germain Foundation in Marseille; he came into contact with high ranking AMORC figure Jeanne Guesdon, reached the 12th degree in the organization, and became the chaplain of the Parisian Rosicrucian lodge. He was also the head of a Paris-based group of the traditional Martinist Order, where he was a significant figure. He at times went by the alias "Humbert de Frankenbourg", his "Knight name".

During the 1960s, he became affiliated with the neo-Templar revalist movement started by esotericist Jacques Breyer. He was also interested in Knights Templar revival movements; he likely joined the Sovereign Order of the Solar Temple, a neo-Templar movement, in 1965, affiliated with Jean-Louise Marsan and Breyer. Interested in these Templar revival movements, of which he was particularly drawn to the apocalyptic aspects, he suggested to fellow AMORC member Raymond Bernard the founding of a Renewed Order of the Temple (ORT), to which Bernard agreed. Following the founding of ORT, Origas was crowned "King of Jerusalem" in a ceremony, using an actual crown. ORT was close to AMORC, and appealed to occultists who were interested in joining a neo-Templar order; it quickly became the largest neo-Templar group. Bernard was the first president of the ORT, but a year later asked Origas to replace him as president. Origas accepted, but returned in a letter that this was only done with the understanding that Origas would be Bernard's "straw man". Bernard quickly let Origas take control, leaving ORT entirely in the following years, and it was then led entirely by Origas.

Even prior to the founding of ORT, he was affiliated with Alfred Zappelli, the leader of the Sovereign and Military Order of the Temple of Jerusalem (OSMTJ). Both organizations later had some connections, but would disagree later. Origas was negatively portrayed by the French media, who criticized him for his affiliation with European white supremacist and neo-Nazi groups. These ideals and connections to the Saint Germain Foundation led to him splitting from AMORC, and ORT became independent of it; the group experienced several schisms, forming various other organizations, and began to draw more concepts from Angela and from Breyer, revolving around messages given by the ascended masters and ideas about the end of the world. Origas was also known to have a "difficult" personality, which led to several schisms within the order.

Origas also visited with the Golden Way Foundation (which involved Joseph Di Mambro, and later became the Order of the Solar Temple); one ex member of the OTS described Julien Origas, Joseph Di Mambro and Breyer as "the three chums who spoke of esoteric things" during these early meetings. Di Mambro and Origas were quite close, and in 1981 Di Mambro arranged for Origas to meet Luc Jouret (a Belgian homeopath, invited by Di Mambro to speak at Golden Way the previous year), and that year Jouret joined ORT. Jouret, a former communist, and Origas, a neo-Nazi, were quite close, and Origas may have appointed Jouret to be his successor.

== Death and legacy ==
Origas died 20 August 1983. Jouret officiated his funeral. Following his death, the ideas of the group only became more bizarre. Jouret became leader of ORT after he died, and attempted to be recognized in this position, but this was opposed by Germaine and Catherine Origas, Origas' daughter – the dispute may have also involved group funds. Less than a year later he was forced out of the group, taking many of the members with him. (Note: Chryssides says the majority went with Catherine, while Hall and Schuyler say the majority went with Jouret.)

As a result, ORT split in two. One group (the one led by Jouret, with 30 former ORT members) later formed the International Chivalric Order of the Solar Tradition (OICTS), later the Order of the Solar Temple (OTS), which was both a continuation of and a schism from ORT. OICTS was a continuation of ORT as well as a schismatic group. Jouret later claimed that this schism had been the will of the ascended masters, who had appeared to him two years prior and revealed to him a 13-year plan until the world ended.

In 1984, ORT was identified as a "very dangerous" group in a publication by the Centre contre les manipulations mentales, a French anti-cult group. The Order of the Solar Temple later became notorious for the mass murder-suicides committed by its members in the 1990s, which killed most of its high-ranking members. The OTS inherited from Origas white supremacist ideas and apocalyptic ideology.
