= Auty =

Auty may refer to:

== People ==
- Chris Auty (born 1957), British film executive, journalist and producer
- Clint Auty (born 1969), Australian cricket player
- Josh Auty (born 1990), British speedway rider
- Martyn Auty (born 1951), English film and television producer
- Peter Auty (born 1969), English operatic tenor
- Wilf Auty (1881–1951), English rugby union player

== Places ==
- Auty, Tarn-et-Garonne, commune in the Tarn-et-Garonne department in the Occitanie region in southern France
