= Diana: Death of a Goddess =

2004 book by David Cohen

- Cover of the first edition
- Author: David Cohen
- Language: English
- Subject: Princess Diana
- Publisher: Century
- Publication date: 2004
- Publication place: United Kingdom
- Pages: 263
- ISBN: 1-84413-795-3
- OCLC: 224109942

Diana: Death of a Goddess is a book about the death of Diana, Princess of Wales by psychiatrist and documentarian David Cohen. It was published in 2004 by Century, an imprint of Random House. A continuation of Cohen's 2003 documentary film on the same topic, Diana: The Night She Died, the book explores conspiracies surrounding the event and concludes that her death was at least partially accidental. It also connects her death and the circumstances around it to the Order of the Solar Temple, a cult notorious for several mass suicides in the 1990s.

The book was a bestseller. It received mixed reviews; its research and some of its conclusions were praised. Some reviewers called it sensationalized, while others praised it for not being sensational. Some criticism was targeted at the book's theories about the Solar Temple, previously expounded in a different documentary by the same author, which were criticized as unsubstantiated and inconsistent with the known facts about that group.

== Background ==
=== Author ===
David Cohen was born in Haifa, Israel. As a child, he lived in Paris and Geneva, before moving to the United Kingdom. He has a PhD in psychology and is a psychiatrist. He has directed several documentaries and written other books of an "exploratory" nature. He was nominated for a BAFTA award for his creation of a film on the Soham murders.

=== Previous documentaries ===
In 1996, Cohen made a documentary about the French Order of the Solar Temple (OTS) cult, which had many of its members die in a series of mass suicides in the 1990s. The documentary was titled "Death of the Solar Temple" (part of the Witness documentary series) and aired on Channel 4. It debates the official telling of the deaths. Following the release of this film, Cohen was contacted by a man calling himself "Guy Leroux", refusing to reveal his true identity, who gave him information claiming to prove Grace Kelly's involvement in the order. Leroux claimed to have been a former member of the OTS and Di Mambro's personal driver. He claimed that Kelly had been initiated, along with several other famous people, into the OTS in 1982. According to Leroux, Kelly's death, deemed an accident, was actually a plot by the group's leader after she stopped paying them, and the massacres were actually a plot by the Italian mafia. Cohen used this information to make another documentary on Grace Kelly, "Secret Lives: Grace Kelly", alongside David Carr-Brown. It aired on Channel 4 in December 1997.

Following the release of the Kelly documentary, Swiss journalist Arnaud Bédat, who researched the OTS, tracked Leroux down and interviewed him. Bédat, having found out his real identity, Guy Mouyrin, said that Leroux had lied about multiple elements of his history and also had multiple prior criminal convictions for fraud, theft, blackmail, and document forgery. He was known by those around him as someone who made up stories, and was then wanted by the Swiss police for over 100 instances of fraud and robbery, known as a "professional con artist". None of the former members of the Solar Temple could recall having ever met Leroux, and the story was contradictory to facts about the Solar Temple, as it had not even existed when the initiation of Kelly had supposedly taken place in 1982 (the OTS was founded in 1984). Kelly's name is also not mentioned in the relatively complete lists of Solar Temple members that were left behind.

When questioned about this by Bédat, Cohen admitted that he did not thoroughly check Leroux's background, and did not know his real identity (or that he was wanted by Swiss police). Cohen himself said in 2017 that he was "convinced that Guy believed the story he had been told", and admitted that the idea was far-fetched. After her death, Leroux also told Cohen that someone else (who he knew through the Solar Temple connection) had told him that they had been paid £500,000 to kill Princess Diana, but it went wrong. Following this he started a documentary on DIana, and in 2003, Cohen released a documentary about Diana's death, Diana: The Night She Died, which aired on Channel 5. In 2017, he made an updated version of the 2003 film, Diana: 20 Years On. He followed the 2003 documentary up with Diana: Death of a Goddess.

== Publication history ==
The book was published in 2004 by Century, an imprint of Random House. It was again published by Arrow (also an imprint of Random House) in 2005. The book was a bestseller.

== Contents ==
The book is largely based on interview testimony, including police contacts and intelligence officials, as well as the person who claimed he had been hired to kill Diana. The book's back cover displays what is purported to be a photo of the car that crashed, shortly before it occurred, while the book's cover claims that it contains "SENSATIONAL new material" on her death. The photo is not actually the last known photo before the crash.

In the prologue, Cohen then discusses how Guy had contacted him shortly after Diana's death, and how he had met Guy and the story of the Order of the Solar Temple, as well as Guy's claimed involvement in the organization, and the connection to Grace Kelly. Cohen claims that he had been able to confirm most of Guy's information. Following her death, Guy gave him new information that was claimed to show a parallel the Grace Kelly death, with a plot to kill her. Cohen says that he is generally skeptical of conspiracy theories, and that the book is the result of his attempt to confirm or deny what Guy had told him about the plot to kill Diana.

After tracing the history of Diana's relationships and her previous life, he traces the chronology of the crash and the police and paparazzi involvement. He criticizes the French investigation. He accuses them of silencing the witnesses, and not investigating a claim that Diana had cocaine in Diana's bag, which he says they covered up. The book also investigates the death of James Andanson, a paparazzo photographer who Cohen connects to the case through the claimed Fiat Uno. He argues Andanson may have been a secret service agent. He also connects Prince Charles to the Solar Temple. Cohen also disputes the idea that Henri Paul was drunk at the time of the crash. Cohen argues that it is plausible given what he knows that Charles's associates decided to kill Diana to make sure that she did not cause him problems. He concludes that there was a conspiracy, but the crash was "at least partly" an accident.

== Reception ==
Diana: Death of a Goddess received mixed reviews. Beryl Bainbridge writing for New Statesman called it a "good read" that "goes a long way towards raising doubts" about the official ruling of the case. She said the book "uncovers much that was deliberately concealed", and praised it for being informational without becoming sensational, saying the book gave a "riveting" account of Henri Paul's life. The Sunday Age said the book's title "reflects the idealised and cult-like status" that Diana had achieved after her death. They contrasted this to the book itself, which they noted never used the word goddess, calling it not an attempt to explore her appeal, but instead "the most sensational investigation to date of what happened in the tunnel below the Place de l'Alma in Paris." Gary Manning, a reviewer from the Telegraph-Journal, said that despite its title it did not offer much insight into the perception of Diana or her status as a "goddess". The Weekend Australian said the book "appears to have been written and edited in haste", with "appalling punctuation, frequent repetition and spelling errors", probably in an effort to make sure it was published before the inquest into Diana's death began.

Manning said that if one read the book "without considering who the victims were", one would come to the conclusion that the only coverup was one of "pervasive ineptitude". He said Cohen offered psychological insight into the case, but that he found himself unconvinced by Cohen's proposed evidence for conspiracy, with the "strings [being] too tenuous" and it not leading to any "solid conclusion". The Sunday Age'said it presented "credible sounding evidence" to the idea that "the truth lies at both ends of the spectrum" (between conspiracy or pure accident). Manning called the information the book provided on the final hours of Diana's life, as well as the "monumental number of questionable actions and decisions" fascinating, and said the book was a clear condemnation of the incompetence of the authorities. The Weekend Australian said that its "well-rounded conclusions" and "detective work" were persuasive. In the book Diana: The Last Days, author Martyn Gregory wrote that the "input of Fayed and John Macnamara is all over Cohen’s work" on Diana, which damaged their quality.

The book's theories connecting the Solar Temple were criticized by some commentators. The Sunday Age said that though many of Cohen's conclusions seemed credible, the Solar Temple link required "a stretch of the imagination". Manning noted the connection as "a strand in the conspiracy web that hasn't been examined before". Jean-François Mayer, a researcher of the Solar Temple, cited the book as one of many works promoting "far-fetched rumors linking the Solar Temple to all kinds of criminal cases and other mysterious events", with Cohen speaking to dubious figures in his investigation on the group. He said that there was no trace of any such tie substantiated by the investigation into the OTS.

The claim of the connection to Grace Kelly likely stems from the fact that Jean-Louis Marsan, the Grand Master of the Sovereign Order of the Solar Temple (OSTS), was a childhood friend of Rainier III, Prince of Monaco, Kelly's husband. Despite the name, the OSTS was a different neo-Templar order and had little to no connection to the Solar Temple, though Marsan had met its leader on one occasion.
