= Order of the Solar Temple =

Esoteric new religious movement (1984–1997)

- Ordre du Temple solaire
- One of the OTS's logos and symbols
- Abbreviation: OTS
- Type: New religious movement
- Classification: Neo-Templar; Rosicrucian; New Age
- Language: French
- Founder: Joseph Di Mambro, Luc Jouret
- Origin: 1984; Geneva, Switzerland
- Separated from: Renewed Order of the Temple
- Defunct: 1997; 29 years ago
- Members: 442 (at peak)
- Other names: International Chivalric Order of the Solar Tradition, ORT–Solar Tradition, Golden Way Foundation, The Pyramid, Order TS, Hermetica Fraternitas Templi Universali, Alliance Rosy-Cross

The Order of the Solar Temple (French: Ordre du Temple solaire, OTS), or simply the Solar Temple, (Note: The OTS had many names. Formerly the ORT–Solar Tradition or the International Chivalric Order of the Solar Tradition (French: Ordre international chevaleresque de Tradition solaire, OICTS or OICST), was renamed Alliance Rosy-Cross (French: Alliance Rose Croix) or ARC (of which the public name was the Association for Cultural Research) shortly before its end. Also known in English as the Order TS and the Hermetica Fraternitas Templi Universali) was a new religious movement and secret society, often described as a cult, notorious for the mass deaths of many of its members in several mass murders and suicides throughout the 1990s. The OTS was a neo-Templar order, claiming to be a continuation of the Knights Templar, and incorporated an eclectic range of beliefs with aspects of Rosicrucianism, Theosophy, and New Age ideas. It was led by Joseph Di Mambro, with Luc Jouret as a spokesman and second in command. It was founded in 1984, in Geneva, Switzerland.

Di Mambro, a French jeweler and esotericist with a history of fraud, co-led the group with Jouret, a Belgian homeopath known for lecturing on alternative medicine and spirituality. Di Mambro had founded several past esoteric groups, and had previous affiliation with a number of other organizations. This included The Pyramid and the Golden Way Foundation, a New Age group founded by Di Mambro that the OTS replaced. The OTS was founded by Jouret and Di Mambro out of a schism from the separate neo-Templar group the Renewed Order of the Temple (ORT), which Jouret had taken over and then been kicked out of. The group was active throughout several French-speaking countries. Its practices focused largely on ritualistic elements, with beliefs in the ascended master figures of Theosophy, who they believed resided on the star Sirius. Its members were largely affluent former Catholics.

Following increasing legal and media scandal, including investigations over arms trafficking and pressure from an ex-member, as well as conflict within the group, the founders began to prepare for what they described as "transit" to Sirius. In 1994, Di Mambro first ordered the murder of a family of ex-members in Quebec, before orchestrating mass suicide and mass murder on two communes in Switzerland. In the following years, there were two other mass suicides of former OTS members in France in 1995 and in Quebec in 1997. In total, 74 people died in the course of these events; it is not known how many of the specific deaths were murder and how many were suicides.

The OTS was a major factor that led to the strengthening of the anti-cult movement in Europe, particularly in Francophone Europe. Due to the death of all high ranking members of the organization, the only one alive to be held responsible was Swiss composer Michel Tabachnik, who had involvement with Di Mambro and was the president of the Golden Way Foundation. Tabachnik was tried in France after the second mass suicide, but was acquitted twice in two trials, found to be innocent on all counts. In the aftermath, many conspiracy theories revolving around the events resulted, some alleging government and organized crime involvement.

== Classification ==
The Templar Cross used by the OTS

The precise definition or classification as to what kind of movement the Solar Temple was by academics is inconsistent; scholars have labeled it variously as an esoteric new religious movement, a neo-Templar group, a Rosicrucian organization, a doomsday or suicide cult, a new magical movement, a magical-esoteric religion, or a secret society, among others. Stephen A. Kent and Melodie Campbell classified the group as a UFO religion. According to Henrik Bogdan, how the OTS is classified depends on "how these labels are defined and what aspects of the OTS are emphasized."

Shannon Clusel and Susan J. Palmer described the OTS as a neo-Templar movement influenced by the philosophies of Rosicrucianism, Theosophy, and the New Age. Bogdan emphasized their status as a masonic initiatory society. Massimo Introvigne has classified them as one of many neo-Templar movements, organizations that claim, through adherence to a set of myths about the secret survival of the Knights Templar, to be a continuation of that movement. Such groups were often affiliated with masonic rites and freemasonry.

The organization was described by the Quebec coroner investigating the case as incorporating a variety of traditions but as primarily inspired by occultism due to its belief in pseudoscientific practices and practices unrecognized by other religions, which required special initiation. Palmer viewed the Solar Temple as fitting within anthropologist Mary Douglas's conception of a "strong group, weak grid" society (with a strong sense of social cohesion, or group, and a weak clarity of group meanings system, or grid), due to the immense pressure it placed on individual members in combination with its "vague and confusing classification system". These societies, according to Douglas, often exhibit a dualistic cosmology, in which the group does not view justice as winning over evil forces.

== Organization ==
The group used many names during its existence, sometimes multiple at once. Following the deaths, "Solar Temple" has been used as the overall common term. The "Order of the Solar Temple" formally was only a part of the larger organization; many members of the "core" of the organization were never actual members of the OTS proper. Many aspects of the group's organizational structure were in flux, as is the case in many NRMs; the organization had several layers, compared to a Chinese box by scholars. The most public face of the organization was the Amenta Club (later Atlanta), which had Luc Jouret lecture on New Age-related issues, including ecology, homeopathy, and naturopathy; it was the Amenta Club from which recruitment was done to the more secretive and ritualistic Archedia Clubs. The third, and apparently most secretive layer, was the International Order of Chivalry Solar Tradition, or the Order of the Solar Temple.

The OTS had a strict hierarchy with three degrees, in the structure of an initiatory Masonic society: the Frères du Parvis, Chevaliers de l’Alliance, and Frères des Temps Anciens (the Brothers of the Court, Knights of the Alliance, and Brothers of the Former Times). The three levels of membership corresponded to the three degrees of initiation: initiates, awakened souls, and immortals. For each degree, a rite of initiation was undergone by the member; specifics of each ceremony varied, but in one ritual ("The Dubbing of a Knight") the officiants were mentioned as: Priest, Deacon, Ritual Master, Matre, Chaplain, Sentinel, Master of Ceremonies, Guardian, and Escorts. The precise relation of these hierarchies to the organization at large is unclear, with the degrees possibly constituting an even more selective group, which some sources call the Synarchy of the Temple. Outside of this framework was the fourth organization, the Golden Way Foundation (previously La Pyramide), which was the parent structure of both the Archedia and Amenta clubs. Members of the OTS paid a monthly membership fee and lived communally.

== Beliefs and practices ==
The beliefs of the OTS were extremely eclectic, with members mixing elements from several different traditions, among them Egyptian mythology, East Asian folk medicine, Rosicrucianism, some gnostic ideas, and ecological apocalypticism. Its members explored a variety of occult subjects, with occultists of varying systems of beliefs being invited to do workshops for the OTS. The Order did not have one coherent method of syncretizing its system of eclectic beliefs; they did not have a "normative theology", instead utilizing allegory and symbolism to clarify their own beliefs in this context. The more distinct beliefs of the OTS (e.g., reincarnation and or the Brotherhood) were hidden.

As an esoteric movement, the teachings of the OTS were elaborated upon only to those deemed advanced enough in the organization. Members progressed through several related movements: the Amenta Club, the Archedia Club, and the OICST. Most of the dead were the high ranking members, with those left surviving being the lower ranking who had less access to the ideas of the group; this has caused difficulties in investigating their beliefs by scholars. Many members of the OTS were wealthy and socially successful, in contrast to many other cults; members were often middle-aged professionals who were highly cultured. This drew from its approach, elitist and interested in aesthetics, with a religious view that was non-fundamentalist. Its members were almost exclusively cultural Catholics, to whom it offered a type of religious mysticism and ritual that had been minimized by the Catholic Church in the previous decades.

Commentators have suggested influences from Eastern religions; Emmanuelle was referred to as an avatar, though this term was not used in any philosophical sense, and Jouret believed the world to be in the Kali Yuga, as in Hinduism. Jouret's usage of the term was not in line with Hindu usage, being a much shorter period (6,000 instead of 432,000 years), more similar to Western astrological ideas. These and related concepts are widespread within New Age and Theosophical movements, and any further inspiration is contested. According to Chyrissides, Di Mambro's contrasting of Emmanuelle as the avatar with the Antichrist showed that he still thought in a quasi-Christian manner. In one of their letters, they displayed a belief in the New World Order conspiracy theory.

The OTS took a large portion of its ideology from the French alchemist Jacques Breyer, inheriting his work's occult-apocalyptic themes. His books were circulated within the organization; It also asserted the arrival of the end of time; one chart calculates the "End of Incarnation" as "1999.8". Other years it gave were 2147, 2156, or 2666, though it also said that others were possible, as they were based on simple calculations. The precise date was viewed as less important than the preparation for the end itself. In another chart, Breyer relates that, based on the year Jesus is estimated to have been born, that the "Grand Monarchy" of the world "ought to Leave this world around 1995–96." The OTS was heavily influenced by the theosophist Alice Bailey. In particular, the preoccupation with the star Sirius and her emphasis on the theosophical concept of the Ascended Masters had influenced the Rosicrucian revival; Di Mambro also utilized her Great Invocation to begin Temple ceremonies. Jacques Breyer, and the New Age movement generally, had drawn heavily from Bailey's ideas. Bailey also introduced the "reappearance of the Christ" concept, where Jesus had been a medium for the "Christ", who, towards the end of the 20th century, as long as a certain set of conditions were fulfilled, would reappear to herald a new age, which would coincide with the drawing of the Masters close to humanity.

Jouret defined seven principles of the Order of the Solar Temple, which were taken basically unaltered from Breyer's Sovereign Order of the Solar Temple (OSTS). The OSTS wrote their seven principles as follows:

1. Re-establishing the correct notions of authority and power in the world.
2. Affirming the primacy of the spiritual over the temporal.
3. Giving back to man the conscience of his dignity.
4. Helping humanity through its transition.
5. Participating in the Assumption of the Earth in its three frameworks: body, soul, and spirit.
6. Contributing to the union of the Churches and working towards the meeting of Christianity and Islam.
7. Preparing for the return of Christ in solar glory.

=== Ascended Masters and Sirius ===
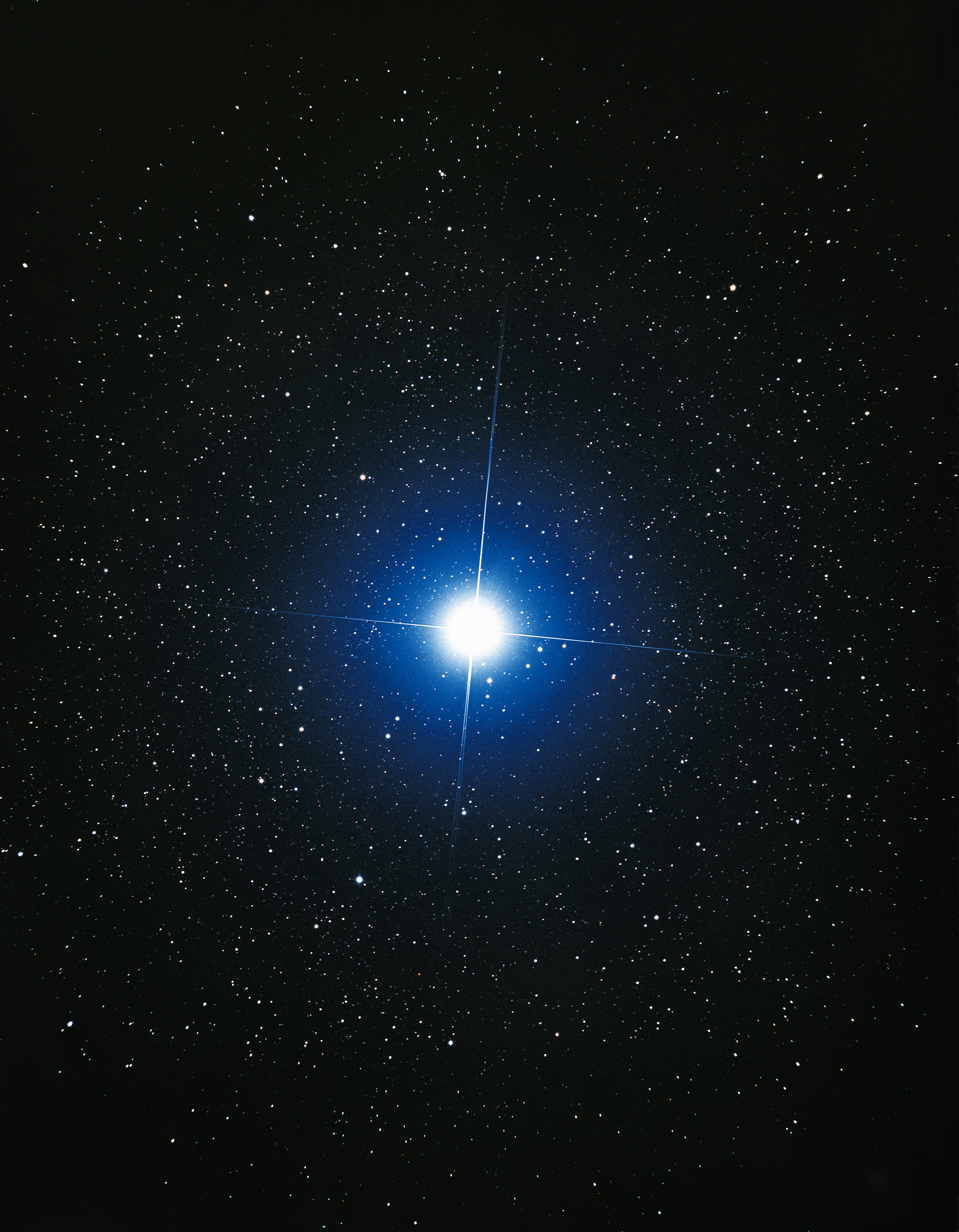
The star Sirius

In OTS theology, the star Sirius was a focal point, as the "Blue Star" that had appeared roughly 26,000 years ago. Following the appearance of the star, the universe's history could be divided into several "ages", viewing the present moment as being one in which the world was moving from the Age of Pisces to the Age of Aquarius; this belief in the astrological ages was shared with several other New Age and occult groups. In the OTS's view, the arrival of the Age of Aquarius would result in the apocalypse, with the Earth being consumed by fire. The OTS then aimed to create a group of souls dedicated to surviving this apocalypse.

The OTS believed Sirius to be the home of the "Ascended Masters" (also called the Great White Brotherhood). The OTS conceived of the Ascended Masters as having arrived on earth, where they inhabited Agartha (an underground spiritual realm popular in esoteric thought). Their belief in the Ascended Masters was shared by the Theosophical Society. The Masters were, in the OTS's conception, effectively souls with the ability to manifest in physical form; both the Masters and human beings were perceived as souls who were merely temporarily occupying their bodies, and at the time of death would move on to another. The OTS believed that advanced or elite members could, at will, "de-corporealize", in accordance with their degree of initiation into the OTS.

=== Reincarnation ===
Both the Masters and human beings were believed to be capable of reincarnation, a key aspect of OTS theology. OTS members believed themselves to be reincarnated versions of the original Templars who had been burned at the stake with grandmaster Jacques de Molay, and even further, members of a class of people who had been reborn since ancient times, whose purpose in the world was to fulfill a "cosmic mission". Di Mambro personally claimed he was a reincarnation of, among others, an Egyptian pharaoh, one of the Twelve Disciples, Longinus (the Roman soldier who pierced Jesus's side during the crucifixion) (Note: As noted by Chryssides, the lives of the apostle and Longinus would have overlapped in time. Chryssides notes this as either a mistake on the informant's end or, alternatively, a sign that Di Mambro may have "had little regard for doctrinal consistency".) and an Ascended Master, Manatanus. Jouret claimed he was a reincarnation of Bernard of Clairvaux, founder of the original Knights Templar. Di Mambro often revealed these past lives to members, in the process giving them new spiritual identities. In doing this, according to Susan J. Palmer, both drama and the illusion of spiritual progress were applied to the member's time in the group.

The OTS was said to believe that souls had no gender, however Chryssides notes this is difficult to reconcile with the "cosmic marriage" doctrine, as well as the explicitly gendered nature of the Ascended Masters who were always consistent in gender throughout their incarnations. One former OTS member expressed the idea that the "inner self" was sexless, with there being no difference between the souls of the sexes. The "Cosmic Child" was always referred to as a he, despite being a girl.

=== Cosmic coupling ===
One important OTS practice was "cosmic coupling" or "cosmic marriage". Following Di Mambro's reveal of a member's past lives, either Di Mambro or Jouret — though Jouret himself was forced by Di Mambro to separate from his wife due to "cosmic incompatibility" — forced apart married couples and put them with other members. A ceremony was performed bonding the "discarnate archetypal forms" of the paired members. Di Mambro himself was bonded with Bellaton in a ceremony (viewed as the reincarnation of Hatshepsut). Di Mambro claimed he did this as the will of the "Cosmic Masters".

The goal of these cosmic couples was to birth seven or nine elite "cosmic children", one of whom was his daughter Emmanuelle (another included Tabachnik's son). According to Di Mambro, these seven children would form "the conscience of the new humanity" and were raised to fulfill this role. The "Cosmic Child" Emmanuelle was the subject of worship by group members; though her specific role in the group is unclear it was unique in the group. She underwent a special baptism of water from the Jordan River and Jerusalem-sourced chrismal oil. At the time of the mass suicides, there were only five cosmic children. In splitting up a couple, Di Mambro explained to them that their "karmic cycle" had been fulfilled; they were reassigned to a new partner, whereupon they were sent off on a mission together.

These pairings often had large age gaps: Dominique Bellaton (in her 30s) was paired with Patrick Vuarnet who was 14 years younger and Thierry Huguenin's marriage was broken apart and his wife (in her 30s) was matched with Di Mambro's 14 year old son. Another cosmic couple had a 30-year age gap. Bruno Klaus, upon leaving his wife at Di Mambro's order, declared: "The Masters have decided. I am going to live with another woman". While marriage was idealized in the OTS, the leaders encouraged defamilialization through this practice. Ex-members often complained they were forced into these cosmic unions, though other ex-members said the OTS did not intrude in their personal or family lives.

=== Ritual ===
Ritual was an important aspect of the OTS's beliefs, described as its "core activity" by scholar Hendrik Bogdan. According to George D. Chryssides, what the OTS offered was a "mystical mood" that was available to all, not just those who were "spiritually gifted"; in a way similar to traditional Catholicism, through ritual the core messages of the group could be made available to those who were not well versed in the systems of thought used to understand it. There were a number of initiation rituals, of a Masonic nature – not in being directly related to actual freemasonry, but in their type of ritual practice, which once it was established afterwards spread outside of freemasonry. The OTS's initiation rituals were typical of neo-Templar groups but also incorporated aspects of New Age, Rosicrucian and alchemical practice.

One initiation ritual, the "Reception Ceremony" of the Hermetica Fraternitas Templi Universali (the name for the OTS in the English speaking world), which was the official initiation into the first degree Templi Noviciae, member candidates called aspirants are first given a copy of the oath they will take so they can become familiar with it (an uncommon practice for other Masonic initiatory societies). The ritual objects used for the ritual include: a Templar cross, a sword, a three branched candelabrum with white candles, a vase containing a red rose, a red cushion, an altar, a sacred book (e.g. a Bible open to the Gospel of John), a red votive candle, and crosses, which are given out to the initiates. The ritual must include six officiants for the initiates. Compared to other Masonic rituals, it starts simply, with the playing of Bach's Toccata and the lighting of the votive candle, before the assembly is brought in, the candelabrum is lit and the chief officiant of the ritual opens and calls for prayer.

The chief officiant then explains the ritual's purpose and tells those present to meditate on the importance of what is about to happen. The aspirants are then brought in, and Gregorian chants are played; the chief officiant asks them if they wish to continue. They are informed that by taking the oath it reaches "beyond human limitation", and once they take the oath their life will be towards the "Path of Service, of Light, and Unity", and that the member's "field of consciousness will broaden and your scale of values will change, giving the full significance to the notions of Honour, Loyalty, Courage, Disciple and Effort", whose concerns should now be to "preserve and respect the Consciousness of Life, to maintain Harmony and radiate Love". Following this, the Vigia (a role probably restricted to female OTS members) or the chancellor would tell the aspirants the meaning of the ritual items used, before the aspirants are made to approach the altar, kneel on their right knee and place their right hand on the book, and read their oath aloud, before signing it. After this is completed, the chief officiant declares that they have reached the degree and gives them a cross as the emblem of the Order, which they are told has been blessed by an "Official Priest" and that all members should wear it during meetings.

Then, at the end, the "Templar Psalm" is read thrice. This psalm is included in many Solar Temple initiation rituals, and reads:

NON NOBIS DOMINE NON NOBIS / SED NOMINI TUO DA GLORIAM transl. NOT FOR US, LORD, NOT FOR US / BUT TO THY NAME GIVE GLORY

After, the chief officiant extinguishes the flames of the candles and candelabrum and announces the end of his work. Hallelujah is then played and everyone except the "Master of Ceremonies" and the "Guardian" positions leave. Another Order TS (the English aspect of the OTS) ritual, "The Dubbing of a Knight" (not an admission ritual, but probably a second degree ritual), states that the knighthood can only be granted by either the Grand Master (Di Mambro), the Deputy Grand Master, or "a dignitary" appointed by the Order. It is Catholic in nature and includes a mass performed at the same time. The oath given in this ritual reads thus:

I [blank] swear here and now a solemn oath to nobly serve the cause of the Temple, in a spirit of detachment and humility.

I shall strive in all circumstances to maintain a worthy and just attitude, not only with regard to my co-disciples, but also whenever I represent our Venerable Order in the world.

I promise to respect the sacred rules of the Temple which rule our Venerable Order, to live them permanently in accordance with the Ethic which constitutes its force and to obey the directives of my Superiors without reserve.

I commit my self to respect and conform to the customs and laws of the countries in which I might be called to serve.

In another ritual, the "Traditional Ritual for the Donning of the Talar", which is more complicated, the candidate is "purified" and sheds their clothes, standing only in their underwear to "cast[...] off all impurities". Scholar Hendrik Bogdan noted several of its lines as "particularly ominous" in light of the deaths. In one part it is stated that

always remain worthy
of wearing this Sacred Robe
whatever may happen,
even if your physical life is in danger,
for you will soon learn
that physical life is of no importance.

As well as the rituals of initiation, there were mystical or magical rituals. Underground sanctuaries were built by the group, hidden behind false walls and only accessible through secret passageways; to enter them, a member would have to take a ritual number of 22 steps (probably a reference to the 22 paths of the Tree of Life in Kabbalah). In one ceremony attended by religious historian Jean-François Mayer in the summer of 1987, designed to commemorate the summer solstice, the OTS members held a bonfire in the French countryside. Following their lighting of the fire, there were instructions and the members turned around the fire only clockwise. Mayer said during the event that it was ritual, whereupon a member corrected him and said it was not merely ritual but "something much more".

One of these rituals was where ranking members could supposedly witness the masters manifest in the underground chambers of the group, in what were actually holographic shows by Antonio Dutoit. OTS rituals may have involved hallucinogens, and utilized visual effects as well as music. Among the utilized effects were lightning effects, through which the masters and ritual objects like the Holy Grail were seen to appear. In order to achieve the community of souls that would survive the apocalypse, the OTS invoked sex magic, in which sexual activities are performed in order to acquire spiritual gain, though how much this was actually practiced is unclear. A former member alleged that Di Mambro would have sex with members of both sexes, and convinced men in the group that sex with him "reharmonize[d] the chakras". Jouret was said to practice this more readily than Di Mambro; Jouret was known to have sexual relations with both men and women in the group.

=== Transit ===
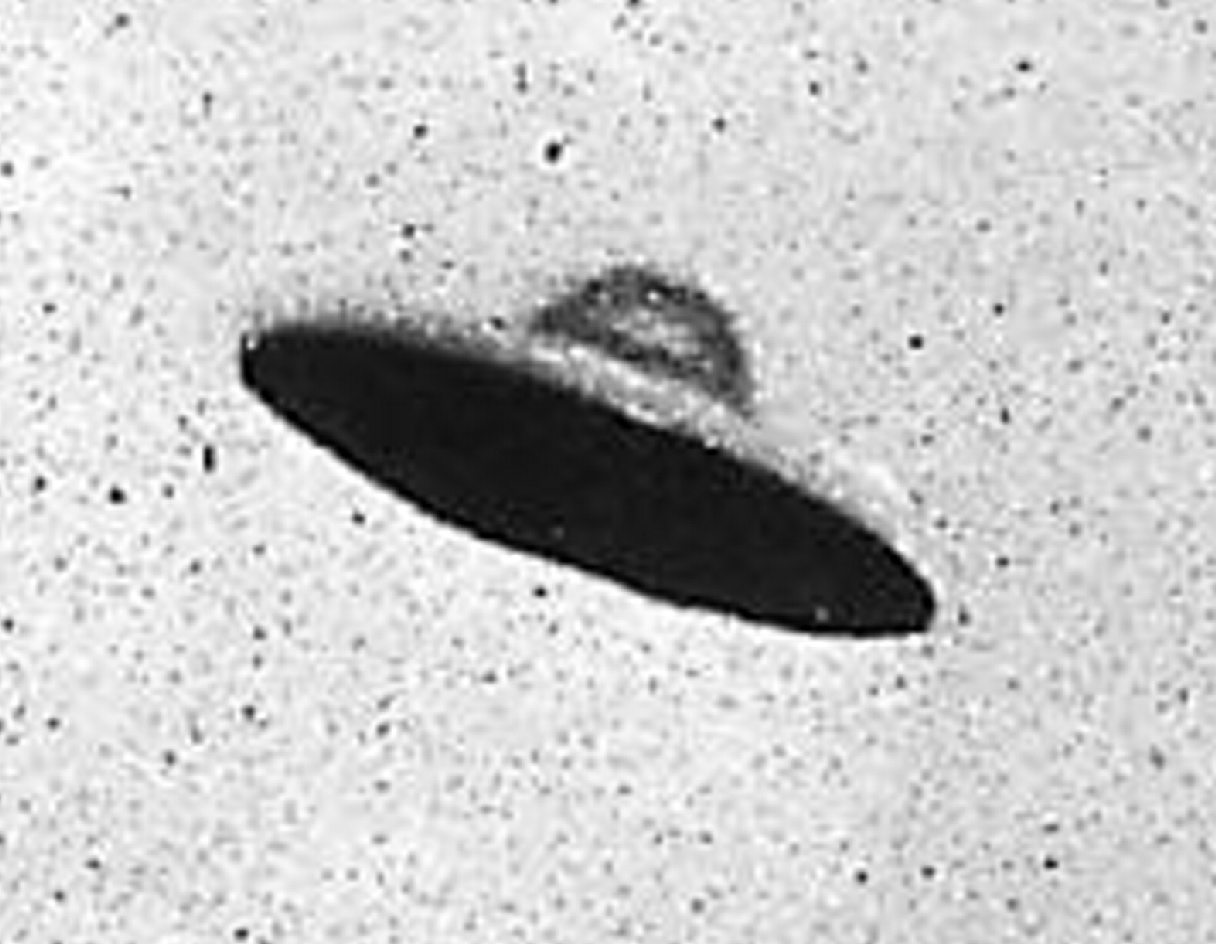
A supposed image of a flying saucer, metaphorically evoked as a method of "transit"

The "transit" terminology and concept is derived from AMORC, which Di Mambro had been a member of. AMORC uses "transit" as a term meaning death, among other vocabulary the OTS borrowed from the organization. AMORC, as with the OTS, saw death as merely a "transition", in which the physical body separates from the soul; unlike the soul, the physical body will change and decay.

The concept had first been brought up by Di Mambro in 1990 or 1991. It was to mean a voluntary departure of the members to another dimension in space, or an act of consent to bring the "germ of life" to another planet. He told the members that they would be summoned on short notice, and would need to be ready as this could occur any day. They conceptualized the transit as a ritual involving magic fire, where they would undergo a spiritual voyage to the star Sirius. According to Di Mambro, he did not know yet how they would transit, though he metaphorically evoked the idea of being picked up by a flying saucer or passing across a mirror. OTS members were familiar with similar ideas prior: in 1987, Jouret had for sale at one of his lectures a comic book,Voyage Intemporel, that tells a narrative of a group of UFO believers who are picked up before a great cataclysm. Following the gun scandal, Jouret began speaking of the transit concept as well.

Palmer argued that the transit could have been viewed as a solution for many of the problems the OTS faced. It prevented the "loss of charisma" that Di Mambro would have to deal with given his old age and illness, as well as his suffering personal relationships with others. The problems of succession that the group faced, with conflict between Jouret and Di Mambro and Jouret's leadership problems in Canada, would also be solved. One interpretation was that it may have been a funeral intended for a Pharaoh (as Di Mambro was interested in Egyptian mythology), intended to bring Di Mambro's "retinue" with him into the afterlife and keep his power.

According to the later testimony of members, they did not interpret it as mass suicide, with one stating that they believed the transit was instead the idea of being saved from disaster. Members otherwise interpreted it innocuously or as an ephemeral concept, such as one interpretation of the transit being that the group would simply move to another geographical location or leave Geneva. According to Mayer, the transit concept was perhaps not a break with the OTS's earlier survivalist ideas, but instead a continuation, a survival in other dimensions where this one was irreversibly doomed. Academic Massimo Introvigne wrote that their suicide "elude[s] easy comparisons with Jonestown and Waco", but was actually far more comparable to the later Heaven's Gate group.

== History ==
=== Background ===
The OTS was one of numerous neo-Templar organizations active in France and Switzerland in the nineteenth and twentieth centuries. These organizations followed a tradition of claiming unbroken descent from a lineage of grand masters that claimed to go back to the original medieval Knights Templar; the original Knights Templar had been dissolved by Pope Clement V following accusations of witchcraft and heresy at the beginning of the fourteenth century. In 1310, 54 Templar knights were burned at the stake, and four years later the Grand Master and a local leader were as well. French esotericist and alchemist Jacques Breyer initiated a resurgence of neo-Templar groups in France in 1952. This "Arginy renaissance" was tied to a claimed mystical experience in the Castle of Arginy, which led to the founding of the Sovereign Order of the Solar Temple (OSTS), which was formally created in 1966.

Joseph Di Mambro was a French jeweler with an interest in esotericism. After scamming a business partner in the late 1960s, Di Mambro fled France, before returning to Pont-Saint-Esprit in 1972 and acting as a psychiatrist. Soon after, he was sentenced to six months in prison for writing bad checks, breaching patient trust, and for impersonating a psychiatrist. In the late 1960s, he became a member and lodge leader of the AMORC organization in Nîmes, France. AMORC is the largest contemporary Rosicrucian organization, structured into lodges which performed initiation rituals into specific degrees. Luc Jouret was a Belgian homeopath. He traveled widely studying various forms of alternative and spiritual healing, before settling in Annemasse and practicing homeopathy there.

=== The Pyramid and Golden Way ===
In 1973, Di Mambro founded and became president of the Center for the Preparation of the New Age (French: Centre de Préparation à l'Age Nouveau, CPAN). (Note: According to Bogdan, CPAN was the first iteration of the OTS and therefore it started in 1973. Others say the OTS was founded in 1978 with the Golden Way or 1984 as a schism from ORT.) CPAN was a yoga school, but also presented itself as a "cultural center for relaxation". In 1976, eight people including Di Mambro, most of whom lived together, formed a building society in Collonges-sous-Salève and bought a building that they called "The Pyramid" (French: La Pyramide). The group was also called by its members the Fraternity of the Pyramid (French: Fraternité de la pyramide). This hid an esoteric society, consecrated as the Temple of the Great White Universal Lodge, Pyramid Sub-Lodge 24 June 1976. In June 1977, Di Mambro met orchestral conductor Michel Tabachnik, who, having an interest in esotericism, attended and became a member.

On 12 July 1978, Di Mambro founded the Golden Way Foundation (French: Fondation Golden Way). The Golden Way became the center of activities in Di Mambro's variety of groups. Several members donated large amounts of money, allowing them to buy a property in Saconnex-d'Arve (Geneva) which hosted meetings, including for non-members. The Golden Way functioned as a "front" for a smaller group of people, the "Fraternity", which undertook secret esoteric rites. The Fraternity, like many other New Age organizations in the 1970s, had communal ideals, holding all their property communally. This attracted members — one member had previously been in the Scottish Findhorn New Age group — but also disappointed them when the reality of the group failed to live up to the ideal. As well as the Fraternity there was the "Community", which was made up of members who kept their income and paid for rent/food and drink.

While the group's headquarters were impressive, the group lacked a successful communicator with which to spread its ideas. In 1981, Jouret was invited as a speaker, and spoke about homeopathic medicine at one of their conferences. Di Mambro was impressed by him, and invited Jouret to join, and he was officially accepted into the group alongside his wife on 30 May 1982, where he quickly rose in the ranks. Di Mambro then told others that Jouret possessed charisma, so he should be the frontman for the group, while Di Mambro controlled it from behind the scenes. Jouret became the group's "propagandist" and began giving lectures promoting it in 1983.

=== Cosmic child ===
In June 1981, Di Mambro, then 57, began an affair with then 21-year-old Dominique Bellaton. He later claimed to receive a revelation from the "masters" that Bellaton would produce a "cosmic child" through theogamy. (Note: Referring to the concept of conceiving a child through divine intervention without sexual relations.) About that time, Jouret founded the Amenta Club (later renamed simply Amenta, then Atlanta). In 1982, Di Mambro announced that a "great mission" awaited the foundation. He also announced that a "child-king" was to be born into the community. Di Mambro had actually impregnated Dominique Bellaton, a former manicurist, who was well known in Geneva and had previously had several affairs with businessmen. Di Mambro claimed that this child's conception was created from the power of his mind and Immaculate Conception.

Their child, initially named Anne Bellaton, was born on 22 March 1982. The child was viewed as "the Christ of the new generation", but was born female, something attributed by Di Mambro to human imperfection (believing the child's mother being human had led to an imperfect Christ). Di Mambro claimed the child was an Avatar, a male soul trapped in a female body. She was then renamed Emmanuelle (the male version, Emmanuel, being Jesus's messianic name), but was referred to with male pronouns. He required Emmanuelle to wear gloves and a helmet to protect her purity as the "cosmic child", who he considered the "messiah-avatar" of the planet's new age.

=== Renewed Order of the Temple ===
In 1970, French legate of AMORC Raymond Bernard established the neo-Templar group the Renewed Order of the Temple (ORT) at the suggestion of Julien Origas, who was given control of the group shortly after. During a meeting of the ORT and the OSTS with the Golden Way Foundation in 1981, Julien Origas met Jouret. Origas was impressed by him, and invited him to come to Auty with him and join ORT. Jouret was initiated into ORT, quickly rising into its leadership ranks. Jouret and Origas became close, and Origas may have appointed Jouret to be his successor and the next Grand Master.

Origas died in 1983, after which Di Mambro urged Jouret to take over the order, and he became its new grand master that year. The same year, Michel Tabachnik was made president of the Golden Way Foundation. Jouret was initially accepted by the remaining ORT members as successor, but began introducing new and foreign concepts into the ORT, inspired by Di Mambro's ideas. Jouret was never consecrated as Grand Master, which was an important process to many esoteric groups, and he was not an officer in the legal aspects of the organization; this was used to oust him in 1984.

=== Founding ===
Following this, the ORT schismed. Jouret had no legal right to the ORT name, so he founded a splinter group in Geneva, Switzerland upon his ousting, alongside Di Mambro, in 1984. Jouret later claimed that this schism had been the will of the ascended masters, who had appeared to him two years prior and revealed to him a 13 year plan until the world ended. This group was formally created 21 June 1984, and at the time of its creation the Golden Way Foundation was formally dissolved (though "Golden Way" was still used to refer to the group's Geneva commune, that still had 50 members).

It was first called the ORT–Solar Tradition before being renamed the International Chivalric Order of the Solar Tradition (French: Ordre international chevaleresque de Tradition solaire, OICTS or OICST) and finally the Order of the Solar Temple (OTS). (Note: The "Order of the Solar Temple" may have initially been the inner circle of the OICST before becoming its main title.) Jouret, a compelling speaker, was the "front man" for this organization, though Di Mambro was the actual leader.

=== Activities ===
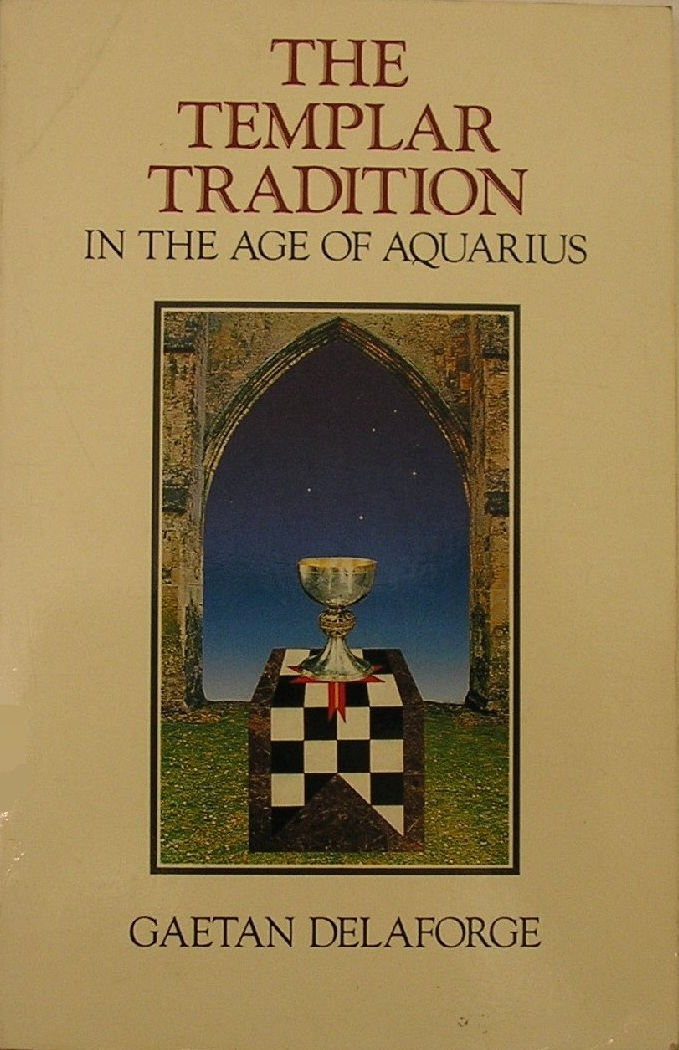
Cover of The Templar Tradition in the Age of Aquarius, produced to spread the OTS's belief

The OTS was dually schismatic and a direct continuation of the original ORT, with occult-apocalyptic teachings descended from that of Jacques Breyer and Origas, which it tied to other apocalyptic concepts, and some white supremacist ideas from Origas. Breyer attempted to mediate the schism, suggesting the groups separate with goodwill; Breyer's mediation did not work and the OTS and the other branch of ORT grew to dislike one another. He suggested that Jouret and Di Mambro's group transfer to Canada to spread the movement. The ORT already had some Canadian administration in Trois-Rivières and Quebec City, which were led by Robert Falardeau. To convince him to help them find land in Canada, Falardeau was given the title of "grand financier" by Jouret and Di Mambro.

From then on, the group's most active locations were in French-speaking Europe and Quebec; from Quebec, the group intended to spread its influence to the United States, and began a translation project to make OTS ideas available to English speakers. This was mostly unsuccessful, as the OTS never had more than a few American members. In the English speaking world, the OTS went by the names Order TS and Hermetica Fraternitas Templi Universali. In 1987, a member of the order using the pseudonym Gaetan Delaforge wrote The Templar Tradition in the Age of Aquarius in English to spread the order's Templar ideas into the United States. The book argues that the Templars survived to the modern day, and that the OTS was its ultimate successor, and was spread in occultist circles.

In 1985, Di Mambro decided to set up a survival center in Canada in the event of nuclear war. An estate, named Sacred Heart (French: Sacré-Coeur) was purchased in Sainte-Anne-de-la-Pérade, Quebec, to create an organic farm. The organization set up several subsidiaries, both official and hidden, to finance these real estate purchases; Di Mambro made a profit by reselling his stakes in these purchases to members. Di Mambro asked Tabachnik to draw up a series of writings to inspire him to rise in ranks within the order, called the Archées. Many of the Order's concepts and principles were inspired by these writings, third degree initiatory texts. Written between 1984 and 1989, they were made up of 21 articles, each ranging from 15 to 20 pages. They were considered difficult to understand even by members of the OTS. In 1987, Camille Pilet, then the worldwide sales director of the Swiss watch company Piaget SA, officially joined the OTS. He donated several million Swiss francs to the order. It is likely that Pilet's donations kept the group from going bankrupt, and were used by the OTS to buy properties. He was the main financial provider of the OTS and the wealthiest businessman in the order.

The group reached its membership height in January 1989, with 442 members: 187 in Metropolitan France, 90 in Switzerland, 86 in Canada, 53 in Martinique, 16 in the US, and 10 in Spain, from which they gained more than $36,000 in monthly revenue overall. Most members of the OTS had little contact with the leadership, and little or no idea of their violent plans. Some financially successful members individually donated amounts ranging from the hundreds of thousands to millions of dollars to the group, to finance the "life centers"; however, some of the money was instead used to fund the leader's own travel expenses, and cost of living expenses for OTS members who did not have other support. The group began to have financial problems.

=== Decline ===
Beginning in the late 1980s, several members began to doubt Di Mambro. In 1990, Di Mambro's son Elie discovered that the apparitions that appeared during OTS ceremonies were faked, operated by Tony Dutoit, who confirmed this before leaving the group. Elie, who also realized that the "masters" his father presented did not exist, then revealed this to other members. Some members explained the falsification away as necessary to keep "weaker souls" in the group, but numerous other members, whose faith in the group had been previously damaged by the silencer scandal, left the group and demanded a reimbursement of money they had donated. Joseph Di Mambro promised to return the sums requested, but several OTS members resigned in quick succession in 1990, leaving only the core group of OTS members. Many people, including Elie and many high-ranking members, left.

The Archedia clubs were dissolved in 1991. The members of the Sacred Heart commune disliked Jouret, accusing him of a lack of financial transparency and sexual exploitation of women. He was viewed as a dictator by the Quebec members of the group, and was also not present often as he constantly traveled. There was a resulting power struggle between the Quebec and Swiss templars. As a result Jouret slowly became less prominent in the leadership role of the Solar Temple and quit its executive committee in January 1993.

=== Anti-cult movement ===
The OTS had largely escaped negative public attention from the anti-cult movement in the 1980s, other than two lines about Jouret published in a French anti-cult booklet in 1984. He and the group were left out of later 1980s editions. In 1991, a former member, Rose-Marie Klaus, contacted a Montreal cult-watching organization, Info-Secte; they subsequently produced a letter warning other organizations in Canada about the group.

Klaus's husband had left her for a "cosmic marriage" to another woman, and she wanted money she had given to the organization returned; she sued the group, and attempted to get the OTS negative press coverage. While her husband Bruno Klaus (who would die in the 1997 mass suicide) had been getting increasingly involved in the OTS, Rose-Marie was growing less involved, but continued to live with him near the group's compound. One day, Bruno arrived home and told her that the OTS masters had decided that he was to be with another woman; Rose-Marie, upset by this, asked Jouret to mediate between them. His solution to this issue followed the OTS practice of "cosmic coupling", which ignored "earthy marriage"; he set Rose-Marie up with another man, André Friedli, later one of the killers in the 1995 incident. Rose-Marie was not satisfied with this and it lasted only briefly. She stated that "I saw later that this man went with other women, the women had other men. It was very mixed up."

For several years after this, she repeatedly tried to get Bruno back, having a "foot inside, but always one outside" the OTS community, but eventually gave up and began contacting anti-cult groups. On 10 September 1991, following several Martinicans leaving the island to join the OTS, the president of Martinique's branch of the Association for the Defense of Families and Individuals (the leading French anti-cult group), sent a letter asking various Canadian associations for information on the group. In 1992, after an invitation from a French cult-watching organization, Klaus visited Martinique, where she denounced the group. Her statements were picked up by the local media.

=== Gun scandal ===
The next year the group encountered further trouble. Canadian police, then investigating Q-37 (a mysterious group that threatened to assassinate Canadian public officials, which was eventually determined to have never existed), believed the OTS may have been involved. Soon after, the group's locations in Quebec were raided and two members were arrested for possession of illegal weapons. Jouret had asked the men to buy three semi-automatic guns with silencers, illegal in Canada, resulting in their arrest. Jouret and the other two men were given only light sentences (one year of unsupervised probation and a $1,000 fine to be paid to the Red Cross), but in the aftermath the media took interest in the group. The Canadian press began to report, using information gained from police wiretaps of conversations between members of the OTS, which they described as a "doomsday cult".

Though Jouret had encouraged some members of the OTS to learn to shoot, at the time, members of Info-Secte believed the group to be of a survivalist nature, and that they intended to use the weapons to defend themselves after an apocalypse; a representative of Info-Secte publicly expressed his confusion as to why they needed silencers for this purpose. Even tabloid newspapers, which ran lurid stories about the organization, did not indicate they believed them capable of violence. In March 1993, some members of the group tried to convince the press that the OTS was harmless and mostly dedicated to moral improvement and gardening, and denied allegations of being a cult.

Following the arrests, other countries and agencies began investigating as well. Two days after the men were arrested, the Sûreté du Québec announced an inquiry into the financial aspects of the group, with the Australian police launching a parallel investigation later in the year. A bulletin from Interpol alleged that Di Mambro and Odile Dancet had been involved in two banking transactions in Australia, each worth $93 million. In 1994, the French authorities delayed the issue of a passport to Di Mambro's wife, Jocelyne, because of an investigation. At the same time, a former member of the OTS, Thierry Huguenin, called Di Mambro and demanded his money back, threatening to file a criminal complaint. In February 1994 a photocopied letter was mailed to about 100 members revealing financial misuse; this made both Di Mambro and Jouret furious. In March, the Canadian RCMP were helping the Australian Federal Police investigate possible money-laundering by the OTS, and the Swiss authorities also received Australian bulletins. No evidence of money-laundering was found, but the accusations fed conspiracy theories.

The OTS viewed itself as increasingly persecuted, though according to Jean-François Mayer, there was little actual opposition to the group, with Quebec Public Security Minister Claude Ryan explicitly stating the government would not surveil cult members in the wake of reports on the group and denying information claiming the group had planned to commit terrorist attacks in Canada. The leadership believed the increasing legal and media attention to be both a conspiracy against the OTS and a sign of the Kali Yuga, and the group's ideas became increasingly focused on environmental destruction and ecological collapse.

Compounding the difficulties, Di Mambro also began having issues with Emmanuelle. Though she had been raised from birth to be a messiah figure, by the age of 12 she had become uncooperative, rejecting her role in the group and taking an interest in typical teenage pop culture. He believed her to be under threat from the Antichrist, who, he believed, was born to Tony and Nicky Dutoit in summer 1994. Di Mambro had previously forbidden Nicky from giving birth, but after she left the group had a son, Christopher Emmanuel. Di Mambro, deeply offended by the name similarity, the disobeying of his instructions, and that he had not been consulted in the naming of the infant, ordered the family murdered later in 1994.

== Mass murders and suicides ==
=== Planning ===
Given the scale of the issues facing the group's leaders, it was decided they would "transit" to Sirius. The OTS described transit as "in no way a suicide in the human sense of the term". In their view, traitors would be simply murdered, while "weaker" members would be "helped" to transit, and the remaining members considered strong enough would kill themselves. Members believed that, upon death, they would acquire "solar bodies" in a faraway location in space (typically given as the star Sirius, but alternatively Jupiter or Venus). The group's leaders wrote four letters expressing these views, known as The Testament, which contained expressions of the order's beliefs. Patrick Vuarnet was instructed by Di Mambro to mail the Testament letters to several people. Shortly before the end of the group, the OTS was renamed Alliance Rosy-Cross (French: Alliance Rose Croix, ARC, with the public name Association for Cultural Research) in a final meeting in September 1994, though this may have actually been intended as a new organization.

The Testament letters divided the dead into three groups.

- "Traitors", who were murdered
- "Immortals", who had been "helped" in death (killed) by other members
- "Awakened", who had committed voluntary suicide

=== Morin-Heights, Cheiry and Salvan ===
On 30 September 1994, the Dutoits were lured to Di Mambro's chalet in Morin-Heights by Dominique Bellaton. Two members, Joël Egger and Jerry Genoud, killed the family, including the three-month-old child, stabbing them repeatedly. As ordered by Di Mambro, these murders were carried out in a ritualistic fashion. Bellaton and Egger left for Switzerland the same day; the Genouds spent the next four days cleaning the scene and preparing for death. On 4 October they set incendiary timers to go off and burn the house down, dying as a result.

During the night from 2 to 3 October 1994, 23 died in Cheiry. Twenty of the dead had been shot with one gun; 21 of them had died from gunshot wounds after being drugged with sleeping pills, with another two suffocated in plastic bags. Egger and Jouret are known killers in this event, though it is possible they were not the only ones. In Salvan, the dead had been injected with poison; according to the investigative report, it is likely that the fatal injections at Salvan were done by Line Lheureux, with Annie Egger doing the same to the children. On the morning of 5 October, the Testament letters were mailed out.

On 4 October 1994, the bodies of the Genouds were found in the burned-out chalet; the next day the bodies of the Dutoits were found in the building's cellar. On 5 October, Swiss examining magistrate André Piller was called by the police to a fire in Cheiry, where bodies had been discovered. Soon after this they heard news of the fire in Granges-sur-Salvan; when the fire died down, bodies were discovered. These two fires were connected when Egger's car, who lived in the Cheiry house, was found parked outside the Salvan commune; the next day, the Canadian police realized that there was likely a connection between the Morin-Heights fire and the Swiss fires as the properties were owned by the same men.

The leadership of the OTS cared deeply about the group's legacy, and spent a large amount of time preemptively creating a "legend" through both the manifestos they mailed to various media and scholarly sources, and by destroying all evidence that would have conflicted with their own story. This plan was disrupted, as some of the incendiary devices had failed. This left behind a large number of the Temple's written documents, some of which were found on the group's surviving computers, as well as audio and video cassettes.

According to Thierry Huguenin, Jouret and Di Mambro had planned for there to be exactly 54 dead, in connection with 54 Templars who had been burned at the stake in the fourteenth century. This was to allow an immediate magic contact with these departed Templars. However, Huguenin, having sensed danger, escaped at the last minute, leaving the death toll at only 53. After the event, some other members declared their continued support for the group's ideas, and even regretted not having been chosen for transit. A Swiss magistrate concluded that of the 52 deaths, only fifteen could be confirmed as suicides.

=== Vercors ===
On the morning of 16 December 1995, 14 members of the OTS, including three children, were immolated in a circular star-formation in an isolated clearing on the Vercors Massif, near Saint-Pierre-de-Chérennes in France. Two other bodies were found near them. The investigation conducted by the Grenoble Gendarmerie hypothesized that the 14 people, including three children, took sedative pills; then Jean-Pierre Lardanchet and André Friedli shot each member in the head one by one with two .22 caliber rifles. After that, they poured gasoline on the bodies and set them on fire, before they both shot themselves in the head with two .357 Magnum revolvers. The bodies of the two perpetrators were found alongside the burned ones. On 23 December 1995, the 16 bodies were discovered after a missing persons investigation by the gendarmerie, after having been led to the bodies by a hunter.

The plot had been orchestrated by Christiane Bonet, a devoted former member of the OTS who said she could commune with Jouret and Di Mambro from the afterlife. Some of those who died left behind notes where they discussed that they would "see another world". Investigators concluded that of the 16 dead, at least four had not died willingly.

=== Saint-Casimir ===
On 22 March 1997, five members of the Solar Temple died in a mass suicide in Saint-Casimir, Quebec, burning their house down with them inside. The dead included two couples: Chantal and Didier Quèze, as well as Pauline Riou and Bruno Klaus (Rose-Marie Klaus's ex-husband), and one of their parents. Responding officers found three teenage survivors at the scene, the children of the Quèzes, who were found to be drugged. Following the first failed attempt to initiate the mass suicide (that included them against their will), the children had negotiated their right to live with their parents, who eventually agreed that they did not have to die. Following this, the adults continually failed to burn the house down, becoming increasingly sick, until eventually the teenagers burned the house down at their parents' request.

The children were ultimately not charged with any crime, as the fact that they had been drugged and the influence the cult could have had on them was viewed as mitigating their responsibility. The adults had mailed a transit letter to several Canadian news outlets, in which they explained that they had taken their own lives believing that their deaths would let them "transit" to another planet to continue living.

=== Legal proceedings ===
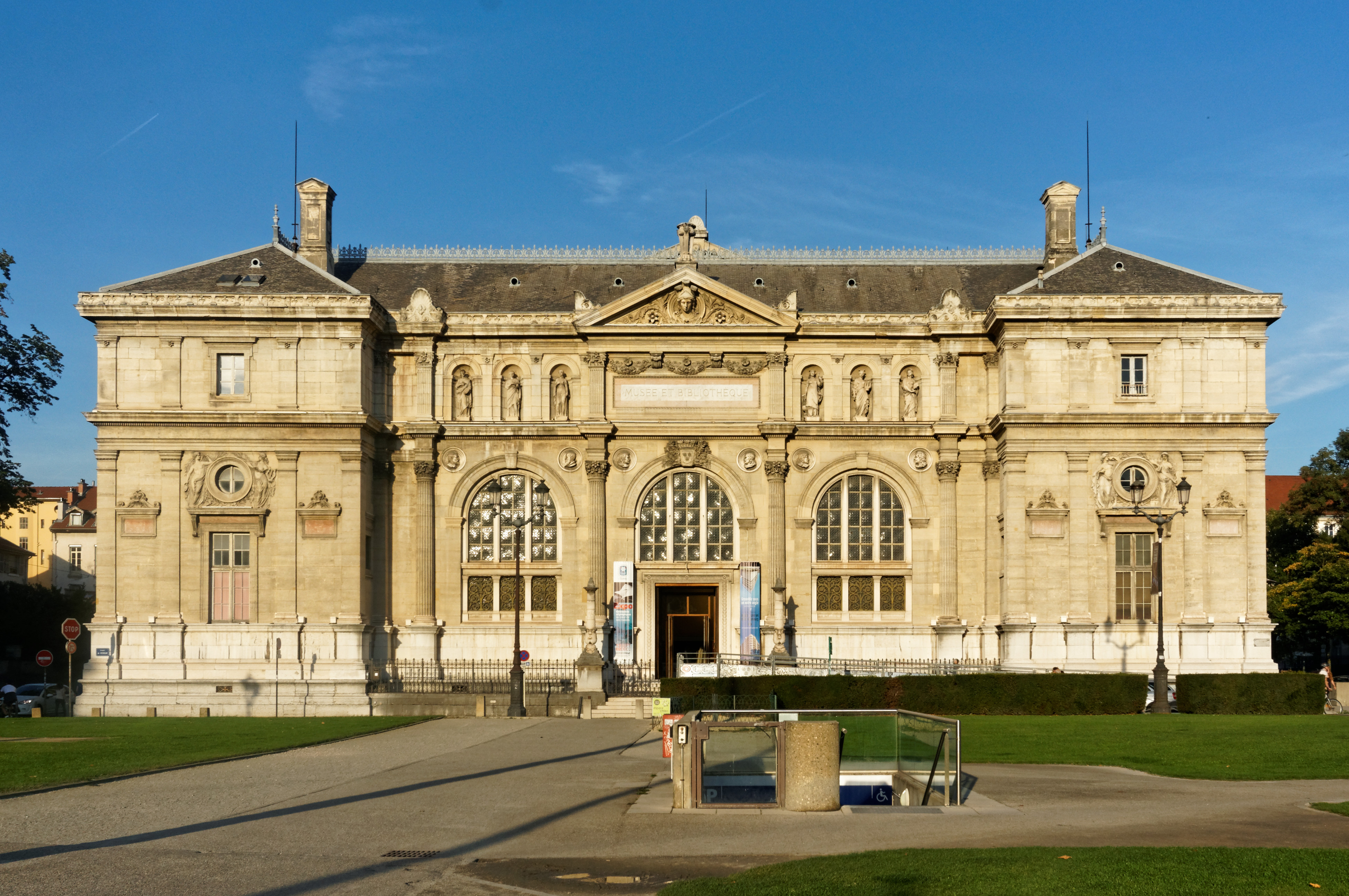
Grenoble's former museum-library, the location of the 2001 trial

On 23 December 1995, during the journal de 13 heures program on the French channel TF1, journalist Gilles Bouleau claimed that the group had survived and united behind Michel Tabachnik, indirectly declaring that Tabachnik was the mastermind behind the Vercors incident. Tabachnik was investigated following the incident; Fontaine placed him under examination on 12 June 1996 for conspiracy. At the time of the investigation, due to the death of the two leaders in Salvan in 1994, Tabachnik was the only defendant in the case. The examining magistrate considered that Tabachnik, through his writings and his conferences, could have incited followers to commit suicide. He was therefore charged with participation in a criminal conspiracy.

On 13 April 2001, at the Grenoble Museum-Library, which had been transformed for the occasion, the court trial of Michel Tabachnik for "criminal conspiracy" began. The plaintiffs' side split into two camps; one camp, led by Alain Vuarnet, felt that the trial should not focus on Tabachnik's responsibility but on the investigation itself, which they felt had not been thorough. Another, led by the anti-cult group UNADFI, believed that Tabachnik and his writings were the cause of the mass suicides, and that cults must be eradicated. On 25 June 2001, the court acquitted Tabachnik, on the basis that there had been no conclusive proof found of any involvement, and his writings accused of influencing the members into death were deemed unlikely to have influenced them. The public prosecutor appealed the criminal court's decision, and Tabachnik was tried again in a second trial beginning 24 October 2006. The appeals court upheld the lower court's ruling, and he was acquitted a second time in December 2006.

== Aftermath ==
That the initial suicides had occurred in Switzerland was a source of shock, as Switzerland is "a country not normally associated with scenarios of doom". The demographics of the Solar Temple resulted in further surprise: the members of the OTS were noted as not conforming to the usual idea of a cultist, vulnerable and easy to influence. The members of the Solar Temple were largely instead respected members of society in powerful positions, middle-aged, many affluent: Robert Ostiguy was the mayor of the town of Richelieu, Quebec, the high ranking OTS member Camille Pilet was in the designer watch business and was a former salesman for Piaget SA, Robert Falardeau was a Canadian government official, Jocelyne Grand'Maison was a journalist for Le Journal de Québec, and Patrick and Edith Vuarnet were the son and wife, respectively, of Olympics gold medalist Jean Vuarnet. This seeming contradiction contributed to the shock felt by the public.

Western Europe's view of cult groups was impacted even more substantially than the deaths at Jonestown had impacted the American perspective on such groups. Similar incidents, like the Aum Shinrikyo sarin attack on the Tokyo subway in 1995, and the two further OTS suicides, cemented this impression. The Solar Temple immediately became well known in France. In the wake of the deaths, fear of cults took hold of the French and Swiss populations. The group's actions gave a major boost to the European anti-cult movement, which had existed for some decades but with little official support. They were a major factor in the toughening of the fight against cults in Western Europe, resulting in a general rise in opposition against purported cults. It prompted European governments to begin to monitor new and nontraditional religious movements, and also influenced the American anti-cult movement. Several parliamentary inquests were held into the issue after the Solar Temple deaths. Following the deaths, on 29 June 1995 the French National Assembly voted, unanimously, to appoint the Guyard Commission to study the phenomenon of cults. These inquests resulted in official reports on the issue from France, Belgium, and the Swiss canton of Geneva which were strictly anti-cult in stance; later reports were less so. After the deaths, Swiss cantonal authorities founded the Centre intercantonal d'information sur les croyances, an organization meant to provide information on religious groups.

Discussions about why the Solar Temple went through with the mass suicides, and why members continued to do so for several years after the first incident and by which time both leaders were dead, have varied in their conclusions. Early studies of the Solar Temple were confused by the assumption that Jouret, not Di Mambro, was the primary leader; Jouret believed himself to be secondary to and had deferred to Di Mambro, despite their occasional disagreements, so theories shifted once that was realized. Some scholars, for example Susan J. Palmer, considered a loss of charisma and manipulation by Di Mambro as the driving factor in the OTS deaths, viewing him as one paranoid man and that the whole OTS had acted on his delusions. When the deaths continued long after Di Mambro was dead, however, this explanation was seen by some as unsatisfactory for the whole story; some scholars (e.g. Catherine Wessinger and John R. Hall) considered the OTS as a group rather than focusing on individuals, saying it was a "fragile" millenarian group, unstable and easily ignited by the barest external pressure, like the police investigations. Others, including Massimo Introvigne and Jean-François Mayer, have argued their beliefs were especially problematic; they argued that in addition to the other noted factors, Di Mambro's ideology was inherently apocalyptic. Popular conceptions in the media blamed it on the brainwashing of the members by the group; there were also a variety of conspiracy theories at play that presented the group as a cover for something more nefarious.

Several books have been published about the case. Several former members of the OTS wrote memoirs, including Tabachnik and Thierry Huguenin. Many journalists authored books on the OTS, including Arnaud Bédat, Gilles Bouleau and Bernard Nicolas, who authored Les Chevaliers de la mort. It has also been the subject of works from academics, including The Order of the Solar Temple: The Temple of Death and Les Mythes du Temple Solaire.

=== Media response ===
Many different narratives about what exactly had happened and what had led to the deaths resulted. Initial media and anti-cult movement responses focused largely on the idea that the members had been brainwashed, but when the relative affluence of the members was realized, they were considered by some to not fit the typical conception of a brainwashing victim.

In the following years, the French media accused other cults/sects of being like the Solar Temple, plotting their own mass suicides; included among them the Unification Church and Scientology, as well as Aumists and Raëlians. The Raëlians were particularly affected by this, repeatedly accused of plotting mass suicide. The leader of the Raëlians, Raël, responded to the affair by saying: "If those idiots in the Solar Temple decided to kill themselves, that is not our problem" and "why do the journalists always call me for comment when there's a collective suicide? I don’t want to die! I want to be around to piss them off for a long time!" The Raëlians put out a press release stating that suicide was against their belief system. The Aumists were also affected, being told by the police that there was a rumor they would commit mass suicide "like the Solar Temple". In January 1998, a group called the Atman Foundation was suspected of plotting ritual suicide in the Teide National Park in the Canary Islands; police of the island had announced they had prevented another OTS suicide, which made headlines around the world. It was later clarified that they were unrelated groups. Later investigations of that group failed to turn up proof of the ritual suicide allegation, and the leader was acquitted of all charges.

In the trial and media coverage of Néo-Phare, a small French cult, the group was frequently compared to the Solar Temple. Le Figaro declared it the "new OTS", and journalists compared the leader Arnaud Mussy to Jouret and Di Mambro. Psychologist and cult expert Jean-Marie Abgrall said during the trial of that group that they were like the Solar Temple, as both groups recorded their meetings and practiced swinging. A former member discussed with the news a comparison between Néo-Phare's doctrine and the Solar Temple's concept of going to Sirius, and in one instance, TF1 producers (who wanted the exclusive rights to make a documentary about the case) wanted them to look like the Solar Temple, surprised at their lack of belief similarities, and when they found out they did not have many, they left. Susan Palmer argued the trial of Mussy may have been an attempt by the French justice system to compensate for the innocent verdict in the Tabachnik trial. The OTS suicides had shocked the French public, and due to the failure of the justice system to convict the only person who ever went on trial in the case, there was no "satisfying" conclusion, deeply frustrating the French authorities.

=== Conspiracy theories ===
Due in part due to the difficulty of explaining many aspects of the OTS, conspiracy theories were common. One former member claimed that the evidence of murder had been fabricated by the Sûreté du Québec; another claimed that the murders were actually a CIA operation to cover up a deal Jimmy Carter had supposedly made with a group of aliens living in an underground laboratory in Nevada. In 1996, a documentary was in production that claimed that Jouret was actually still alive. According to Susan J. Palmer, "false or unverifiable trails have been laid: secondhand testimonies are traded by journalists, ghost-written apostate memoirs are in progress and conspiracy theories abound." It was seen as suspicious that the members of a cult were affluent and respected members of society, not fitting the typical idea of a brainwashing victim. Narratives then shifted to a conspiratorial one, in which the OTS was not actually a cult but a front for something else entirely.

The specifics of this narrative vary; some have involved the far-right, terrorism, organized crime, money-laundering, and the secret services of several countries. The claims that the OTS had 93 million dollars in their accounts was found to have resulted from a misreading of a fax, and there was no evidence ever found of money laundering. The accusations nevertheless fueled conspiracy theories and press speculation. In one theory, commentators alleged connections between the OTS and various political scandals, citing alleged links between Jouret and members of Gladio. While some neo-Templar movements to which the OTS was a successor had ties to the right-wing Service d'Action Civique, there were no known ties to the OTS itself; through the claimed association with the SAC the OTS was implicated in a variety of political scandals.

Many books have been written by journalists promoting different conspiracy theories, but no significant evidence of them has ever surfaced, and they were dismissed by investigators in both Canada and Switzerland. Other conspiracies linked the OTS to famous people and events, although none of these claims have been substantiated. In one example, David Cohen, in his 2004 book Diana: Death of a Goddess, attempted to link the OTS to both Princess of Monaco Grace Kelly and then-Prince Charles. The theory was based on testimony by a well-known Swiss fraudster and does not align with known facts about the OTS.
