= Jacques Breyer =

French esoteric writer (1922–1996)

- Breyer in 1982
- Born: Jacques Roger Jean Breyer; 27 March 1922; Noyon, Oise, France
- Died: 25 April 1996 (aged 74); Le Pouliguen, Loire-Atlantique, France
- Notable work: Arcanes Solaires: Ou les secrets du Temple Solaire, Terre-Omega

Jacques Roger Jean Breyer (27 March 1922 – 25 April 1996) was a French esotericist, alchemist and writer. He published and wrote various books on esoteric topics; his works included apocalyptic teachings and themes. He launched the "Arginy Renaissance", a rebirth of an independent wing of esoteric neo-Templar groups — groups that claimed to be revivals of the Knights Templar — in France in the 1950s. He was influential in the development of many of these organizations, including the Order of the Solar Temple, notorious for its several mass murders.

== Early life ==
Jacques Roger Jean Breyer was born 27 March 1922 in Noyon, Oise, in France. He was raised in Anjou, born to a family of wine sellers. His secondary education was interrupted by the outbreak of the Second World War; he joined the French Resistance, where he was a second lieutenant helping the Comet Line. He was arrested by the Gestapo in April of 1944, and then deported to a concentration camp in Buchenwald and then Flöha. While there he met and befriended writer Robert Desnos.

Following the liberation of France, he was ill with tuberculosis – visiting the Pyrenees for treatment, his mother gifted him a few items that had belonged to her father, one of which was a grimoire of herbal medicine. Following this, he became interested in esotericism.

== Esotericism ==
In 1951, he contacted the owners of the Castle of Arginy, trying to interpret a possible esoteric meaning to the graffiti on the keep walls. The following spring, he moved into the farmhouse next to it, where he lived for the next seven years; while living there, he cared for its animals and the sick, lectured in Lyon and Paris, and perform theurgy in its dungeon.

That year he met a journalist attempting to write an article on the site, Marcel Veyre de Bagot, who he befriended and attempted theurgy alongside. Breyer viewed this as the start of a rebirth of the Knights Templar (later called the "Arginy Renaissance"), the medieval Order of the Temple. Breyer's actions in Arginy led to a second, independent branch of neo-Templar groups (compared with the main OSMTJ organizations that had existed for many years).

=== Sovereign Order of the Solar Temple ===
Breyer began to acquire a circle of freemason and occultist orbiters, including Armand Barbault, Jean de Foucault, Victor Michon, Vincent Planque, Pierre de Ribaucourt, Maxime de Roquemaur, and Jean Roux. Later inclusions were Jean Soucasse, then Robert Chabrier, Bernard Wiernick, and Georges Sourp. Roquemaur claimed he was a descendant of a branch of the original Templars, who had secretly survived in Ethiopia, carrying on a supposed esoteric legacy from these original Templars. Roquemaur and Breyer then proceeded to found the Sovereign Order of the Solar Temple (OSTS), members of which founded several other Masonic organizations in France.

In this period, he wrote his first two books, Dante Alchimiste in 1957 and Arcanes Solaires: Ou les secrets du Temple Solaire two years later. Breyer claimed that he had discovered a document dated to the 1700s in the French BnF, which allegedly stated that the final Grand Master of the Knights Templar, Jacques de Molay, had passed on his authority to his nephew; further, he identified Arginy as the original location at which the Templars had been founded. He said that relics would be found at the family estate of this nephew – no relics were found, but Breyer started workshops in Ergonia which drew the interest of others.

He claimed these writings related directly to knowledge possessed by the original Knights Templar, though he later denounced these works as "incomplete" and "inaccurate". The OSTS's ideology focused on heavily apocalyptic elements, including the "Solar Christ" concept. Breyer claimed that he had founded the OSTS at the suggestion of the "Masters of the Temple", who he said were the spirits of the Knights Templar. Breyer became greatly influential on subsequent neo-Templar groups and was viewed as a spiritual mentor by many in them. Breyer resigned from the OSTS in 1964, after which the OSTS was embroiled in crisis; they reorganized again in 1966 and 1973.

He then left Arginy and moved to Paris in 1959, where he encouraged the founding of a conference center, workshops and a publishing house. While he directed some research workshops, he lived and worked alone. He was made Master in the Willermoz Lodge of Lyon (related to the Grande Loge Nationale Française) two years later; however, he was never a formal member of any Masonic group. He was also a contributor to the La voix solaire magazine, for which he wrote articles, and published a play based on Tarot cards, Oubah. Breyer's thought was apocalyptic, teaching of an imminent destruction which he dated to 1995.

=== Order of the Solar Temple ===
He was invited as a guest speaker for the Golden Way Foundation (later, the Order of the Solar Temple (OTS). The organization studied his work, and took symbols from it. He attended meetings from the group in 1985 in Geneva, and one ex member of the OTS described Julien Origas, Joseph Di Mambro and Breyer as "the three chums who spoke of esoteric things" during these early meetings.

Breyer's ideology was greatly influential on the development of the OTS, and they circulated his books within the organization. The OTS had inherited from Breyer's works occult-apocalyptic themes. In late 1987 he dissociated himself from the group and its two leaders, Joseph Di Mambro and Luc Jouret, as their ideas and doctrine were growing increasingly incompatible with his. Later, the OTS changed some of its doctrine, drawing away from aspect's of Breyer's work, through lessening the emphasis on Christianity. Following the mass suicides and murders by members of the group in 1994, he strongly condemned their actions, saying what they had done was incompatible with his system of belief and his works.

Following his death, during the trial of Michel Tabachnik over the OTS deaths in 2001, his name was brought up, with the prosecution presenting Breyer as a "secret master" of the OTS. They also argued that esoteric texts written by Tabachnik were very similar to works by Breyer, and that Breyer's works had been "of a nature to scare anyone who gave credit to his words since he dated the cataclysm". This was denied by Tabachnik, who said he had only met Breyer infrequently and that he could not understand most of his writings. In contradiction to the prosecution's portrayal of Breyer, a former member defended him, saying that he was a "loner" who had been used by Di Mambro. She said that the day after the deaths were publicized, he had called her, crying, and that he had said the OTS "[did not] understand anything" and that what they had done was "not life". Breyer was only indirectly related to the OTS, contrary to their claims. Lawyer Alain Leclerc, who was also involved in the OTS trial, represented Breyer's family after his death.

== Works ==
Breyer was a prolific author. Religious historian Jean-François Mayer described Breyer's work as having a "very particular and rather hermetic style". Occultism scholar Serge Caillet described his "most important" work as being 1972's Terre-Omega, described as a "metaphysical thesis based on lines". Dante Alchimiste focuses on the relationship between alchemy and the work the Divine Comedy. Breyer's book Arcanes Solaires: Ou les secrets du Temple Solaire espouses the "solar Christ" concept that was key to the OSTS; Mayer described it as a "rather difficult work". Arcanes Solaires contains several charts and alchemical formations, many of which are based upon ancient thought about triangles, including the Star of David, which Breyer claims is unrelated to Jews but was actually sourced from an unrelated "revealed religion". Breyer interprets the triangle as resting along the line of historical time, where sages can move in and out of reality and where the "Solar Depository" can be carried in and out of time if said sages "coordinate their actions with rare dates of high energy".

The book also discusses the Age of Pisces astrological concept, which it also ties to the triangle, with seven-colored rainbow rays representing the different ages on the bottom side of the triangle. The work says the Age of Pisces began with the birth of Jesus and connects it to the Book of Revelation in a chart. The last phase of this age had begun in 1848, and was split in two, with the first half of the last age concluding in 2002. The book ends with a study of the eponymous "secret of the solar temple". He splits the history of mankind into six ages, which were each dominated by one religion; this age was said to be dominated by Christianity, which would be the final religion, and the end of this age would be the end, with humanity moving on to the new, celestial Earth once it concluded.

Breyer says that leading up to the end of this age, that "After Struggles on all Planes, Union achieved between Sulfur and Mercury. (Grand Monarchy. Temple. Apotheosis. Truth.) 'Fire!'" It also says the world had reached the end of time; one chart calculates the "End of Incarnation" as "1999.8". Other dates he gave were 2147, 2156, or 2666, though said others were possible, as they were based on simple calculations. The precise date was viewed as less important than the preparation for the end. In another chart, he says that based on the year Jesus had been born (four years before the start of the first millennium) that the "Grand Monarchy" of the world "ought to Leave this world around 1995–96."

== Death ==
Breyer died 25 April 1996 in Le Pouliguen, Loire-Atlantique.

== Publications ==
- —— (1957). Dante Alchimiste: Interprétation alchimique de la Divine Comédie (in French). Paris: La Colombe / Editions du Vieux Colombier.
- —— (1959). Arcanes Solaires: Ou les secrets du Temple Solaire (in French). Paris: La Colombe / Editions du Vieux Colombier.
- —— (1972). Terre-Omega: Clefs initiatiques pour survivre a l'Apocalypse (in French). Paris: Robert Dumas Editeur.
- —— (1978). Les Forces Occultes du Bonsaï: Horticulture Sacrée (in French). Paris.
- —— (1979). Au Dessus des Tombeaux (in French). Paris: Éditions Ergonia.
- —— (1984). Vaincre la seconde mort (in French). Paris: Le Bibliophore.
- —— (1989). Le philosophe: L'ecologie spiritualiste (in French). Paris: Éditions Ergonia.
- —— (1992). Il Faut Souffrir pour Être Beau (in French). Paris: Éditions Ergonia.
- —— (1994). Ésotérisme: Clefs Opératives Vérifiées (in French). Paris: Éditions Ergonia.
