= Raymond Bernard (esotericist) =

French esotericist (1923–2006)

- Undated photo of Bernard
- Born: Raymond Antoine Bernard; 19 May 1923; Bourg-d’Oisans, Isère, France
- Died: 10 January 2006 (aged 82)
- Organization(s): AMORC, Renewed Order of the Temple, CIRCES, OSTI
- Spouse: Yvonne Noyrey (m. 1951)
- Children: Christian Bernard

Raymond Antoine Bernard (19 May 1923 – 10 January 2006) was a French esotericist, Rosicrucian, and freemason. Bernard was a member or founder of a number of different esoteric orders across decades. He was the grand master of French AMORC, a large Rosicrucian order, in Francophone countries. As part of AMORC, he founded the neo-Templar order the Renewed Order of the Temple with Julien Origas. Bernard left that order a few years later and gave leadership of it over to Origas.

Bernard left AMORC under uncertain circumstances in 1977 and was replaced in his position as grand master by his son, Christian Bernard. After leaving AMORC, Bernard founded the esoteric orders OSTI and CIRCES. As part of CIRCES, he was a personal advisor or friend to the president of Cameroon, Paul Biya. His connection to Biya attracted attention and controversy over the large financial donations Biya made to him and his orders, though their precise relationship is unclear. He was particularly active in spreading Rosicrucianism in Africa, and wrote several allegorical works about esotericism topics.

== Early life ==
Raymond Antoine Bernard was born in Bourg-d’Oisans, Isère on 19 May 1923. He was raised in a Catholic family who had origins in Dauphiné. Bernard attended secondary school in Grenoble. He studied law at a school in Grenoble, though his studies were interrupted by World War II. He married Yvonne Noyrey in Bourg-d'Oisans on 19 February 1951. Their son Christian Bernard was born in November of that year.

== Esotericism ==
=== AMORC ===
In 1941, he was introduced to esotericism by an English Rosicrucian by the name of Edith Lynn, and a few years later he came into contact with Jeanne Guesdon, as well as Ralph M. Lewis, both high ranking AMORC figures. In 1952 he was admitted to AMORC's inner knighthood, and Lewis appointed him an administrator of the organization in 1965; Lewis then appointed him as AMORC's grand master in Francophone countries, a post he held from 1959 to 1977. He served many positions in the organization, structuring it in Francophone nations (especially African ones). Beginning in 1956 he was the grand master and "Supreme Legate of the Imperator".

Due to the resulting success, he acquired a château for AMORC in 1969, which became the headquarters of the Francophone Grand Lodge in 1973. In the 1950s, he was also involved in Italian Freemasonry, and joined the French Grande Lodge nationale française Opéra, where he achieved the three symbolic grades given out by the organization. At this time, he was initiated into the Ordre martiniste traditionnel (OMT), which Lewis gave him the responsibility to re-establish in France; he did this alongside AMORC, though given the reputation OMT had in the United States this was made difficult. In 1963, Raymond Bernard met with Anton Leuprecht, supreme head of the Autonomous Grand Priories of the OSMTJ (those who did not follow Antonio Fontes), and received a personal document recognizing him.

In 1970, he founded the Renewed Order of the Temple (ORT) of which he became the secret grand master until 1972. The group was founded at the suggestion of Julien Origas, also a member of AMORC, to which Bernard enthusiastically agreed. The creation of this group was supposedly validated by a "White Cardinal" apparition that had appeared to Bernard in Rome, who initiated him as a Templar. This was published in a 1969 book by Bernard. Bernard later admitted that this apparition was purely fictional, along with several other of his claimed mystical sightings, but said all were based on "deeply moving personal mystical experiences". He left this group entirely in the following years, and it was then led by Origas.

Sources are unclear on the circumstances under which Bernard left AMORC. Some say he resigned as grand master in 1977, or that he had to step down. Serge Toussaint, a future grand master of French AMORC, declared in 2014 that he had actually been expelled, and that AMORC had nothing to do with any of his later endeavors. He was replaced as grand master and legate by his son Christian Bernard. Bernard would later become Imperator (leader) of AMORC as a whole.

=== CIRCES and OSTI ===
After Bernard resigned as grand master of French AMORC, he founded several other Rosicrucian orders. He fully resigned from AMORC in 1987, after which he founded the Centre international de recherches et d'études spirituelles (CIRCES, founded 1988, later renamed Comité d'Initiatives et de réalisations caritatives et sociales) which aimed to continue Templar ideals but did not claim a direct lineage from the original Templars.

He founded the Sovereign Order of the Initiatic Temple (French: Ordre souverain du Temple initiatique, OSTI) in 1971. He was grand master, however this order was largely dormant until 1988, after he left AMORC. Bernard was the grand master of both groups, and they merged in 1993, with CIRCES becoming the charity wing of the OSTI as the Comité d'initiatives et de réalisations caritatives et sociales. In the late 1990s he entrusted responsibility of the organization to Yves Jayet, giving him the status of grand master, after which he had no direct control. He joined the Grande Loge de France in 1991 following his departure from AMORC. Bernard ceased being grand master of CIRCES in 1997.

Bernard wrote several books that included representations of esoteric elements like Agartha, Rosicrucian orders, as well as an occult world government controlled by a figured called "Maha"; these were allegorical works, though many took them literally.

=== Affiliation with Paul Biya ===
CIRCES was popular in Cameroon, and from 1987 on Bernard began spending longer periods in the country. The president of Cameroon, Paul Biya, was a Rosicrucian and donated 40 million francs to the organization in return for Bernard's services. It is likely that Biya was a member of CIRCES. Biya often invited Bernard to Yaoundé, the country's capital. Bernard was also his personal adviser, to whom he granted a several million Franc allowance. Bernard said he advised him on cultural matters. Biya gave CIRCES and the OSTI tens of millions of francs in the period of 1988 to 1992. 11.2 million Francs were transferred from Cameroon's National Hydrocarbons Company (SNH), connected to the government, to Bernard's personal account.

When asked by investigators, Bernard claimed the money was for "advice" valued 600,000 francs, a sale of the Bernard Buffet painting "Vanity" for 5 million francs, and said that the last six million francs were to CIRCES and had been credited to his personal account by mistake, thereafter refunded. CIRCES was also given 2 million francs from SNH and 40 million from Biya personally. An organization called FAO gave CIRCES 20 million Francs; it was concluded this was the UN agency The Food and Agriculture Organization United Nations, though FAO later denied this and Bernard indicated the money may have again come from Biya. He said that he was not sure where that donation had come from. Biya was an honorary president of CIRCES; Bernard said that a few other African presidents (Omar Bongo, Gnassingbé Eyadéma, Félix Houphouët-Boigny) were also honorary presidents of CIRCES. This connection resulted in substantial media attention and controversy, though the precise relationship between the two is uncertain.

In the 1990s Bernard was investigated as part of the investigation into the Order of the Solar Temple, a neo-Templar group and schism from ORT that committed several acts of mass murder–suicide. Bernard was interrogated about his ties to its leader esotericist Joseph Di Mambro (described by investigators as someone "close" to him) as well as his financial ties to Biya. Bernard did not otherwise work and was retired, but at this time had an estimated network of about 20 million francs. When the Cameroonian presidency was questioned about this connection by Le Monde in 2000, they declined to comment. They separately said Bernard was not an advisor but an "old friend". They did not comment on the financial transactions. The large financial donations were not inherently a crime but they were seen as curious to investigators. Ultimately, no indication of Bernard's responsibility in the Solar Temple case was established and he was not indicted. The financial aspect was seen as too tangential to the Solar Temple case to further investigate.

== Later life and death ==
His influence is significant in Africa, where he spread AMORC through French-speaking countries and their heads of state. Scholar Peter Geschiere said that he may have been involved in "important transfers of money" in Francophone Africa.

Bernard died on 10 January 2006. CIRCES continued to exist as of 2008, and also had an English branch. In 2012, associates of Bernard created a bilingual website to reignite interest in his works, which was launched on his birthday on 19 May; it is organized by specific event, and also discusses the mission of the OSTI.

== Publications ==
- —— (1968). Les maisons secrètes de la R+C (in French).
- —— (1968). Rendez-vous secret à Rome (in French).
- —— (1968). L'Empire Invisible (in French).
- —— (1970). Messages du sanctum céleste (in French). Éditions Rosicruciennes.
- —— (1971). Fragments de sagesse rosicrucienne (in French). Éditions Rosicruciennes.
- —— (1973). Nouveaux messages du sanctum céleste (in French).
- —— (1976). Rencontres avec l'Insolite (in French).
- —— (1978). Lettres de nulle part (in French). Éditions Rosicruciennes.
- —— (1994). La Cathédrale cosmique (in French). Dervy.
- —— (1995). Enseignements du maîtres de la connaissance (in French). Dervy.
