= Sovereign Order of the Solar Temple =

Neo-Templar group

- Ordre souverain du Temple solaire
- The OSTS's flag
- Abbreviation: OSTS
- Classification: Neo-Templar
- Grand Master: Jean-Louis Marsan
- Language: French
- Founder: Jacques Breyer, Maxime de Roquemaure
- Origin: 1952
- Defunct: 1994

The Sovereign Order of the Solar Temple (French: Ordre souverain du Temple solaire), abbreviated as OSTS, was a neo-Templar revivalist order and secret society. It claimed to be a direct continuation of the Knights Templar. It was founded by French esotericist Jacques Breyer and Maxime de Roquemaure in 1952, and was formally established in 1966 in Monaco. Its Grand Master was Jean-Louis Marsan. The order was dissolved in 1994.

Despite the similar name, the Sovereign Order of the Solar Temple is only indirectly related to the Order of the Solar Temple (OTS), which would notoriously end up committing mass murder-suicide in the 1990s, though they are often conflated or confused. Despite the lack of direct relation, the OSTS was ideologically influential on the OTS, which took many of its concepts and ideas directly.

== Background ==
Neo-Templarism is a term used to refer to several orders and organizations which claim to descend from or to have revived the original Knights Templar; the claims of descent are false and are widely criticized by medievalist historians. Such orders mostly descend from Bernard-Raymond Fabré-Palaprat, who claimed that he had discovered evidence of such descent.

A second branch of neo-Templarism, independent from prior groups that descended from Fabré-Palaprat, was created by French esotericist and author Jacques Breyer. Breyer had experienced what he claimed was a mystical experience in the Castle of Arginy in 1952. The Arginy castle is tied to legends of supposed Templar treasure and Templar mysticism. After the experience in the castle, Breyer met the occultist Maxime de Roquemaure, who claimed that he was part of a branch of an order that descended directly from the original Templars, which had secretly survived in Ethiopia. From this experience grew a circle around Breyer and several other movements, including both the OSTS and the Ordre du Temple cosmique (OTC).

== Beliefs and practices ==
Many of the OSTS's ideas were explicitly apocalyptic and involved the idea of the end of the world and the return of the "Solar Christ", with Marsan positioning himself as the 23rd Templar grand master in a direct continuation from the original Templars. Marsan was only known publicly mononymously, as "Jean". Its beliefs, syncretic in nature, were inspired by Christian esoteric thought, and they accepted the Pope's authority, denying all prior attempts to revive the Templars, though viewed the actions of the pope who had shut down the original Templars as an "affront". The group had some Christian elements and practiced a liturgical "Essene rite". Breyer later wrote a book on the Solar Christ concept, in which he claimed the Arginy castle was the founding site of the Templars. Other elements incorporated UFO and alien beliefs.

The group had a strict hierarchy. Women were welcome in the order (given the title of amazone blanche), but all members had to be at least 18 years old. Many members were high ranking or well established people in society: CEOs, company executives, police officers. Members of the group would celebrate the "resurgence" at the Arginy castle, and new members would be initiated at the castle at this time. Other locations relevant to Templar history would also be visited. Members would wear a standard dress at their holiday meetings; the order's standard was a black and white checkered gonfalon. Its motto was Rien pour nous!, lit. 'Nothing for us!'

The order's beliefs were set out in a book called Pourquoi la resurgence de l'Ordre du Temple? (lit. 'Why the resurgence of the Order of the Temple?') The volumes of the book were sold for very high prices at the group meetings. The principles of the group were defined as follows:

1. Re-establishing the correct notions of authority and power in the world.
2. Affirming the primacy of the spiritual over the temporal.
3. Giving back to man the conscience of his dignity.
4. Helping humanity through its transition.
5. Participating in the Assumption of the Earth in its three frameworks: body, soul, and spirit.
6. Contributing to the union of the Churches and working towards the meeting of Christianity and Islam.
7. Preparing for the return of Christ in solar glory.

== History ==
The Sovereign Order of the Solar Temple (French: Ordre souverain du Temple solaire, OSTS) was created in 1952 by Breyer and de Roquemaure. Breyer claimed that he had founded the OSTS at the suggestion of the "Masters of the Temple", who he said were the spirits of the Knights Templar. The OSTS brought together many neo-Templars, including ones from the French Riviera. Some of the initial members of the OSTS were involved in the founding the National Grand Lodge of France Opéra. One member of this order was the far-right activist and suspected terrorist Yves Guillou.

In the late 1950s and early 1960s, Breyer experienced some personal problems that led to him withdrawing from esotericism and stepping away from the order. Breyer resigned in 1964, resulting in a crisis, but the group reformed in 1966 and 1973. For Grand Master, Jean-Louis Marsan was elected. Marsan, born 1923, was a socialite from Monaco. The order was officially established 24 June 1966. It was incorporated the next year in Monaco. Esotericist Julien Origas probably joined in 1965, with Marsan as his "godfather". The group made public statements to the French press and held press conferences in 1973, stating its aims and goals.

It requested that the bishops of France begin the process to rehabilitate the Knights Templar, seeking an audience with the Pope, that same year. At the time, one commentator thought the group was a hoax intended to mock modern Templars. Paris Match criticized them in their coverage, receiving a letter in response from Marsan where he attempted to rebut their allegations. Their existence was criticized by other claimed Templars, who argued against them reviving a group which they said had never died, or viewing it as an unsatisfactory revival. Beginning in 1978, the Order had some members in Canada. That year, the Ordre du Temple cosmique formed out of the order, from a schism.

On 21 March 1981, the ORT and the OSTS convened in Geneva with a third organization, the Golden Way Foundation. The Golden Way Foundation was founded by one Joseph Di Mambro, and was recognized by Breyer as part of his Arginy movement. During this ceremony, the ORT and the OSTS renewed an allegiance to a "once and future" secret Master of the Temple with supremacy over both organizations (though this meeting did not represent a merger between the groups). Attending were Marsan, Di Mambro, and Luc Jouret. This meeting was in an effort to achieve "Templar unity" in order to bring the groups closer together or fuse. That year, the OSTS began to have issues, with arguments breaking out over its rites. The group schismed into two, one which embraced a more New Age and mystic appeal, and the other maintaining the original Templar origins; Guillou and some of his associates joined the former.

Marsan died in 1982. Following his death, he was succeeded by Jean Soucasse. The order was dissolved in 1994. Despite several attempts to revive it, it is defunct. Breyer died in 1996.

== Legacy ==
Despite the similar name, the Sovereign Order of the Solar Temple is only indirectly related to the Order of the Solar Temple, which would notoriously end up committing mass murder-suicide in the 1990s, though they are often conflated or confused. Marsan, also known as "Loulou", was a childhood friend of Rainier III, Prince of Monaco, which resulted in a conspiracy theory that the OTS was involved in the death of Rainer's wife, Grace Kelly. In reality, there is no evidence that they had any relation to the organization or that they were members of even the OSTS.

Breyer and the OSTS were however influential on the OTS's ideology. Di Mambro, leader of the Golden Way Foundation and later the OTS, viewed the 1981 meeting with the OSTS and ORT as the true founding of the Solar Temple. The OTS took the seven principles almost verbatim from OSTS publications.
