= Centre intercantonal d'information sur les croyances =

Swiss cult watching organization

- Centre intercantonal d'information sur les croyances et sur les activités des groupements à caractère spirituel, religieux ou ésotérique
- Abbreviation: CIC
- Formation: 2001; 25 years ago
- Headquarters: Geneva
- Location: Switzerland
- Official language: French
- Director: Manéli Farahmand
- Website: cic-info.ch

The Centre intercantonal d'information sur les croyances (CIC) is a publicly funded Swiss organization based in Geneva that provides information on religious beliefs in French-speaking Switzerland. Founded after the deaths of many members of the Order of the Solar Temple cult in the 1990s, it aims to provide neutral resources on information related to religious beliefs, particularly when it comes to new religious movements. It was established in 2001.

== History ==
CIC was founded when, following the Order of the Solar Temple deaths in the 1990s, the cantons of Geneva, Vaud, Valais and Ticino decided to fund the creation of an information center focusing on religious beliefs in 2001. There had been a report that showed a lack of information on cults in Switzerland in 1997 as a result. The new organization aimed to both be preventative of future issues and to address the Swiss population's concerns following the Solar Temple deaths.

Other cantons could join the proposal, though the Canton of Fribourg rejected it. Government representatives of Fribourg argued that intervention on cults was needed on a country-wide level, not just in French-speaking regions, and that given Fribourg as a canton is bilingual it would not participate in an organization that would leave out its German speaking population. The state councilor further pointed out that they disagreed with the classification of some specific movements as dangerous (namely Jehovah's Witnesses and the Salvation Army). The management committee of the National Council of Switzerland declared matters of beliefs were the responsibility of the cantons.

The organization is based in Geneva. The director at the time of its founding was Nicole Durisch. As of 2024, the director of CIC is Manéli Farahmand.

== Operations ==
CIC mostly deals with new religious movements, migrant religion, as well as related ideas, such as spiritual therapies. It receives an average of 500 reports a year, on a variety of groups and movements. CIC staff are trained in the study and sociology of religion and the organization aims for cooperation with relevant academia; it is not an anti-cult group. It aims to provide neutral information on religious beliefs.

CIC provides consultation on the topic of religious beliefs, as well as documentation, research resources and referrals to psychological and legal help.
