= Auty, Tarn-et-Garonne =

Auty
- Commune
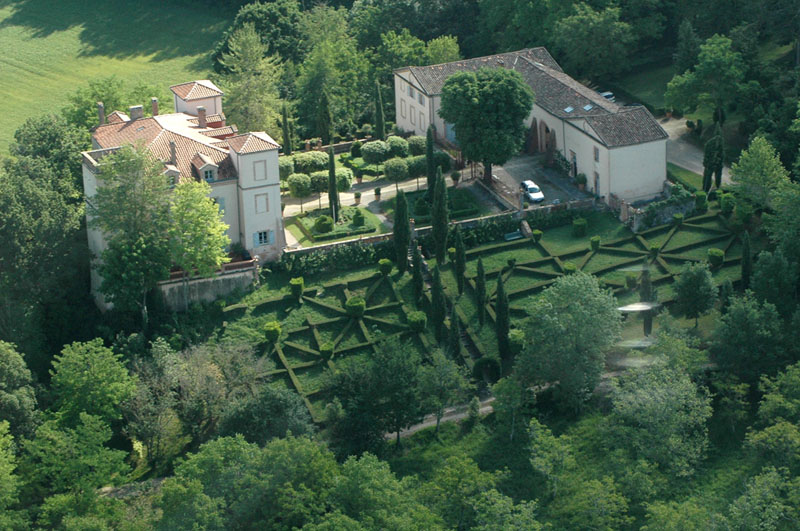
- Château d'Auty
- Location of Auty
- Location within France Location within Occitanie
- Coordinates: 44°11′31″N 1°28′05″E
- Country: France
- Region: Occitania
- Department: Tarn-et-Garonne
- Arrondissement: Montauban
- Canton: Quercy-Aveyron
- Intercommunality: CC Quercy Caussadais

Government
  - Mayor (2020–2026): Gérard Craïs
- Area^{1}: 7.42 km^{2} (2.86 sq mi)
- Elevation: 220 m (720 ft)
- Highest elevation: 218 m (715 ft)
- Lowest elevation: 123 m (404 ft)
- Population (2023): 142
  - Density: 19.1/km^{2} (49.6/sq mi)
- Time zone: UTC+01:00 (CET)
  - Summer (DST): UTC+02:00 (CEST)
- INSEE/Postal code: 82007 /82220
- ^{1} French Land Register data, which excludes lakes, ponds, glaciers > 1 km^{2} (0.386 sq mi or 247 acres) and river estuaries.

Auty (French pronunciation: [oti]; Occitan: Autí) is a small village commune located in the Tarn-et-Garonne department in the northern Occitanie region of southern France.

== History ==
The primary headquarters of the neo-Templar group the Renewed Order of the Temple were in Auty, in the Château d'Auty.

== See also ==
- Communes of the Tarn-et-Garonne department
