= Breitenbach, Bas-Rhin =

Breitenbach Braitebàch
- Commune
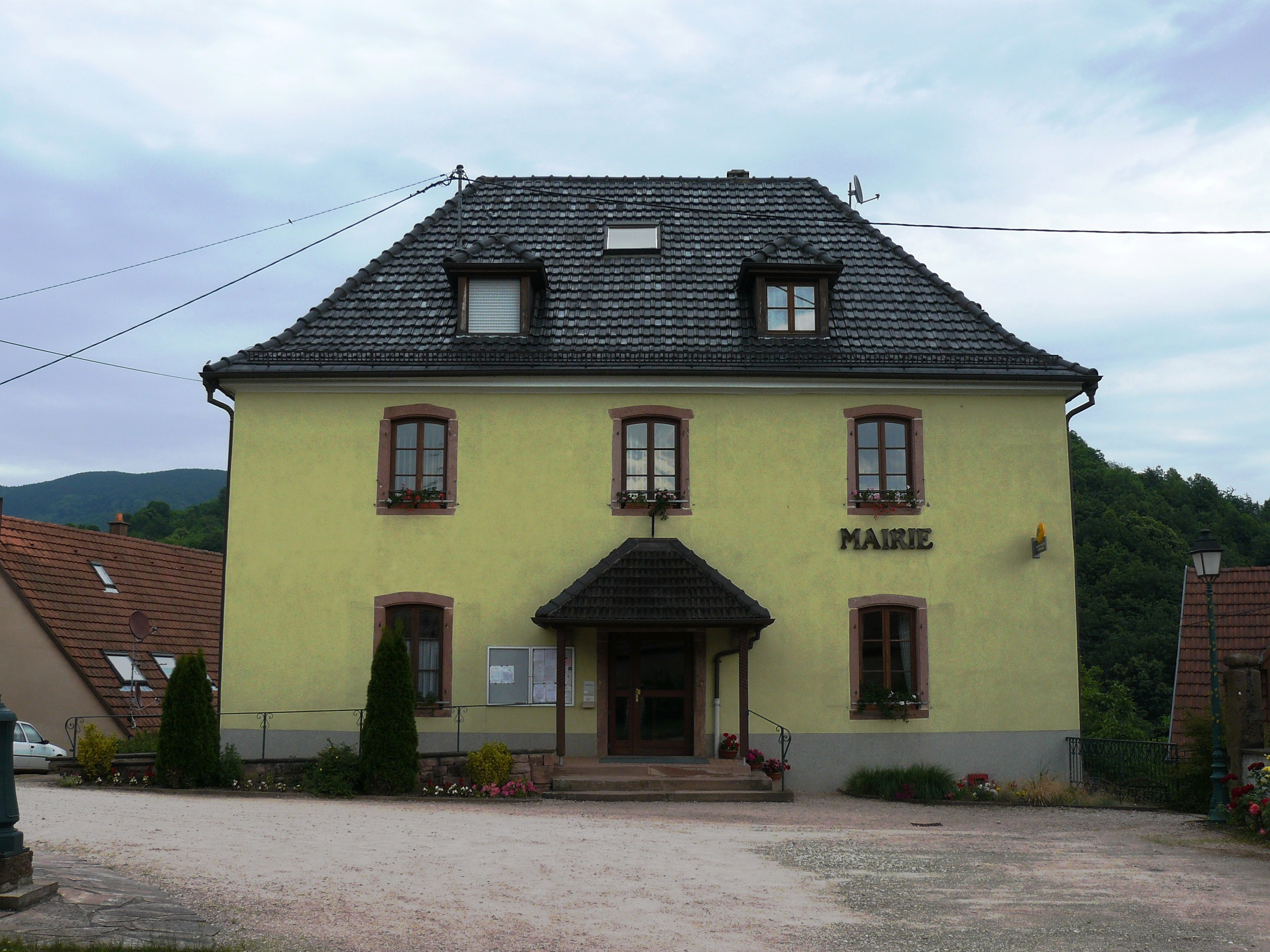
- The town hall in Breitenbach

- Coat of arms
- Location of Breitenbach
- Location within France Location within Grand Est
- Coordinates: 48°21′56″N 7°17′30″E
- Country: France
- Region: Grand Est
- Department: Bas-Rhin
- Arrondissement: Sélestat-Erstein
- Canton: Mutzig

Government
  - Mayor (2020–2026): Jean-Pierre Piela
- Area^{1}: 11.73 km^{2} (4.53 sq mi)
- Highest elevation: 1,073 m (3,520 ft)
- Lowest elevation: 304 m (997 ft)
- Population (2023): 686
  - Density: 58.5/km^{2} (151/sq mi)
- Time zone: UTC+01:00 (CET)
  - Summer (DST): UTC+02:00 (CEST)
- INSEE/Postal code: 67063 /67220
- ^{1} French Land Register data, which excludes lakes, ponds, glaciers > 1 km^{2} (0.386 sq mi or 247 acres) and river estuaries.

Breitenbach (Alsatian: Braitebàch) is a commune in the Bas-Rhin department in Alsace in north-eastern France.

== See also ==
- Communes of the Bas-Rhin department
