= Joseph Di Mambro =

French esotericist (1924–1994)

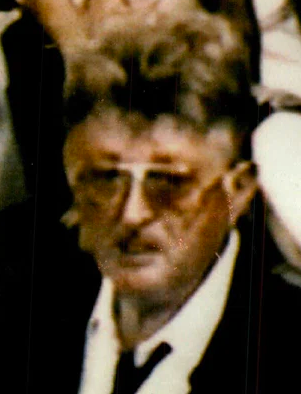
- Di Mambro at Brisbane Airport, 1993
- Born: Joseph Léonce Di Mambro; 19 August 1924; Pont-Saint-Esprit, France
- Died: 5 October 1994 (aged 70); Salvan, Valais, Switzerland
- Cause of death: Suicide
- Organization: Order of the Solar Temple
- Spouse: Jeannine Saltet (m. 1944, divorced) Hélène Ghersi (m. 1966, divorced) Joselyne Duplessis (m. 1977; death 1994)
- Children: 5

Joseph Léonce Di Mambro (19 August 1924 – 5 October 1994) was a French esotericist who founded and led the Order of the Solar Temple alongside Luc Jouret. Di Mambro had been associated with a variety of esoteric groups before founding OTS. He was convicted of several counts of fraud, including impersonation of a psychiatrist. He founded the Solar Temple with Jouret in 1984. He committed suicide in the Swiss village of Salvan on 5 October 1994 as part of a mass murder–suicide.

Born in 1924 in France, the son of an Italian immigrant, Di Mambro was apprenticed as a watchmaker and jeweler in his teenage years. After World War II, Di Mambro joined the Rosicrucian organization AMORC. In the late 1960s, Di Mambro scammed a business partner and then fled France, before returning several years later. In 1972 he was sentenced to several months in prison on unrelated charges. Afterwards, he founded several New Age and spiritual groups, including the Golden Way Foundation, and met Luc Jouret in the 1980s. Under Di Mambro's direction Jouret took control of the neo-Templar Renewed Order of the Temple group; he was ousted shortly after, but Di Mambro and Jouret then formed a schismatic group, the Order of the Solar Temple.

While Jouret was considered by the public to be the figurehead of the group, Di Mambro was the true head of the organization. Following stressors within the group, Di Mambro and Jouret became increasingly paranoid, and the group's ideological concept of "transiting" to another dimension would grow more prominent. They began to plot a mass murder–suicide which they called a "transit". In October 1994, many members were murdered in Cheiry under his direction. Di Mambro himself died of suicide by poisoning, alongside 24 other members of the Solar Temple in Salvan, Switzerland.

== Early life ==
Joseph Léonce Di Mambro was born 19 August 1924 in Pont-Saint-Esprit, a town in the Gard department of France, the oldest of three siblings. His father, Raphaël Di Mambro, was an immigrant from Northern Italy, a glassworker. His mother Fernande Marie Raoux was a seamstress. Di Mambro was regularly bullied in school for his Italian heritage. While extremely close to his mother, he hated his father and his sister; he viewed his father as lacking ambition.

His family was not particularly religious, though Fernande would sometimes attend church, and Di Mambro was fond of the atmosphere of mass. At the age of 16, he gained an apprenticeship as a jeweler and watchmaker. At a young age, he viewed himself as better than other youth, apart from the rest. When the glassworking facilities closed down during the occupation of France (as the Nazis had little interest in glass work), his father instead made weapons for the Nazis, as did many other workers at the time. When some of his associates joined the French Resistance, he distanced himself from them, while also trying to avoid being incorporated into the STO (the Vichy France compulsory work program for the unemployed). His friends stated that the occupation made him secretive and distrustful of others.

Towards the end of the war, the occupying Germans attempted to hunt down the remaining resistance fighters and those who refused to participate in the work program, and many went into hiding. Possibly in an effort to avoid forced labor and being moved to Germany during the occupation, Di Mambro married Jeannine Saltet on 11 March 1944, having a single child in the relationship, Bernard. He did not attend school for long, preferring music; after the war he was part of an orchestra. Saltet was also a musician and would later become a music teacher. After a friend's family's house was raided by German officials and burnt to the ground for collaborating with the French Resistance, Di Mambro's house was also searched; his family was spared by the Germans due to the fact he played the violin, as the German officer was a musician. Following the liberation of France, his father disappeared under mysterious circumstances and was never found. Di Mambro did not mourn him for long.

== Esotericism ==
Di Mambro was then known to be interested in spiritualism. He opened a jewelry store, where he fixed watches and surrounded himself with luxury goods, noted to be obsessed with appearances. After the war, his business began to do badly, and Di Mambro instead decided to make a living as a medium. He became well known locally for supposedly mystical abilities.

Starting in the 1950s, Di Mambro became involved in esoteric groups. He attended an AMORC meeting in 1955, which was then one of the most active groups, and became affiliated with them, joining in 1956. AMORC was then the largest Rosicrucian order. He became convinced that he was a "great spirit" from the ancient past. He quickly learned about AMORC teachings, joining a group in Nîmes. He regularly attended the lodge, learning AMORC teachings. He claimed to develop psychological abilities as a result of this, particularly immense concentration. He became head of an AMORC lodge in Nîmes in 1956, which lasted until 1958. While Di Mambro found little respect elsewhere, he commanded respect in AMORC, training as an initiate over the next few years. He became skilled at manipulating others, speaking of visions in a way that commanded the attention of those around him. Soon after, he learned of the Knights Templar, and became fascinated. By 1966, he had divorced his first wife; that year, he married again to Hélène Ghersi, who he lived with in Pont-Saint-Esprit. He soon introduced her to occultism.

=== Fraud convictions ===
In 1967, he met Albert Boiron, a technician. Di Mambro convinced him to join him in the jewellery business, and they began to work together out of Di Mambro's apartment. Di Mambro introduced Boiron to spiritualism, which Boiron became very interested in. After working together for a few years, Di Mambro suggested they move their workshop to the basement, and Boiron agreed; however, soon after this move, Di Mambro disappeared, along with all of Boiron's gold, jewels, and jewellery. Boiron hired a lawyer in an effort to track him down, but was unsuccessful, and never saw Di Mambro again.

At this time, Mambro was in Tel Aviv with his wife and their two children, with his wife expecting their third child, as he believed that his child being born in Israel would grant it an "exceptional" destiny. Their child, Élie, was born in November 1969 in Tel Aviv. This was the third child of Hélène and Di Mambro. While in Israel, he continued to express interest in the occult, writing a letter to his friend Guy Bérenger discussing occult sentiments. He left AMORC in 1970. Believing that his past actions had been forgotten, Di Mambro moved back to Pont-Saint-Esprit in 1972, and acted as a psychologist. Soon after, he was sentenced to six months in prison for writing bad checks, breaching patient trust, and for impersonating a psychiatrist.

=== Group leadership ===
Di Mambro approached members of the Sovereign Military Order of the Temple of Jerusalem (OSMTJ), a Templar order that met in Geneva. Di Mambro founded in 1973 the Centre for the Preparation of the New Age in Collonges-sous-Salève. Two years later, a Geneva-based community known as La Pyramide, founded by Di Mambro, began meeting regularly in a house in the Geneva countryside, for community, discussion and mutual support on topics such as diet and spirituality.

About 1977, he divorced Ghersi, following several instances of him cheating on her. In 1977, he married Joselyne Duplessis, a 28-year-old woman from Lyons (Di Mambro, meanwhile, was 55). They had met through occult circles; Joselyne could not have children, which Di Mambro did not mind as by that time he already had four. According to someone who knew them, they got on very well, and were extremely close, keeping no secrets from each other. However, they were noted to not act affectionate to one another. As Duplessis was Di Mambro's wife, she quickly gained power within the community and was distant and cold to the rest. She wrote out his sermons, and did not mind Di Mambro's constant cheating on her, which she tolerated without complaint.

A fire occurred in 1979, which has been suggested to have possibly been an insurance scam by Di Mambro. Orchestral conductor Michel Tabachnik attended, enjoyed the atmosphere, and became a member, where in 1977, he met Di Mambro, who suggested he take over the community and structure it. The following year, the two men created the Golden Way Foundation, of which Tabachnik became president. Di Mambro was perceived by Foundation members as a medium and as a "walk-in" being (a being who takes on the body of another with their consent).

In 1982, Di Mambro announced that a "great mission" awaited the foundation. He also announced that a "child-king" was to be born into the community. Di Mambro had actually impregnated Dominique Bellaton, a former manicurist, who was well known in Geneva and had previously had several affairs with businessmen. Bellaton's parents had brought her to Di Mambro at the age of 19, worried about her interest in men and drugs; Di Mambro told her that she was the reincarnation of Hatshepsut, and made her his main mistress. Di Mambro claimed that this child's conception was created from the power of his mind and Immaculate Conception. This was backed up in a ceremony, in which one of the invisible Masters pointed a sword shining a beam of light at Bellaton's throat (the sword was actually fitted with a lightbulb).

Their child, initially named Anne Bellaton, was born on 22 March 1982. Joselyne did not mind this, and agreed to take care of the child even though it was not hers. The child was viewed as "the Christ of the new generation", but was born female, something attributed by Di Mambro to human imperfection (believing the child's mother being human had led to an imperfect Christ). Di Mambro claimed the child was an Avatar, a male soul trapped in a female body. She was then renamed Emmanuelle but was referred to with male pronouns. In January 1986 Di Mambro legally recognized the child as his biologically at the French Consulate in Quebec.

Jouret gave a number of lectures in which he defended the existence of a link between a spiritual approach and homeopathy. Having noticed Luc Jouret's good elocution and communication skills, Di Mambro decided to meet him, and was charmed. He invited Jouret to join the Golden Way, where he quickly rose in the ranks. In 1983, after the death of Julien Origas, leader of the neo-Templar order the Renewed Order of the Temple (ORT), Di Mambro urged Jouret to take over the order, and he became its new Grand Master the same year, before he was expelled by Origas's daughter.

== Solar Temple ==
In 1984, Jouret and Di Mambro formed the International Chivalric Order of the Solar Tradition (French: ordre international chevaleresque de Tradition solaire, OICTS) in Geneva, which would later become the Order of the Solar Temple. Jouret was the outward image and primary recruiter for this organization, though Di Mambro was the actual leader. However, according to former member Thierry Huguenin, inside the order Jouret was simply like everyone else having a job to do; he was the grand master, but Di Mambro was the secret master unknown to the public.

Di Mambro variously claimed to be a reincarnation of Osiris, Akhenaten, Moses, and the Italian occultist Cagliostro. He pretended to receive his orders as the leader of the group from mysterious masters. Di Mambro ordered his followers in their personal lives, particularly the OTS practice of cosmic coupling, which forced apart married couples and put them with other members, which he claimed as the will of the "Cosmic Masters". A former member alleged that Di Mambro would have sex with members of both sexes, and convinced men in the group that sex with him "reharmonize[d] the chakras". This sometimes involved practices like sodomy and sexual relations with other males, though Jouret was said to be more engaged in that than Di Mambro was.

=== Decline ===
Beginning in the late 1980s, several members began to doubt Di Mambro, and several scandals and issues rocked its membership. Elie wrote a letter to his father, accusing him of being a monster. He then returned to the group, but upon his return discovered his father's prop closet used to fake the mystical apparitions that appeared in OTS ceremonies. They were operated by Antonio "Tony" Dutoit. Dutoit confirmed this and left the group. Dutoit, a Swiss citizen, was formerly very close to Di Mambro, to the point where he was considered his adopted son. He was the one in charge of the ceremonial special effects staged by the group. After 1991, he distanced himself and had threatened to reveal that the effects were fake. His wife Nicky Dutoit had been for some time responsible for educating Di Mambro's daughter. Elie, who also realized that the "masters" his father presented did not exist, then revealed this to other members.

In response, some members left the group and demanded a reimbursement of money they had donated. Di Mambro promised to return the sums requested, but several OTS members resigned in quick succession in 1990, leaving only the core group of OTS members. The leaders began to monitor members who said they wanted to leave the OTS. Some were spied on, others had their phones tapped. Many members, including Di Mambro's own son and many high-ranking members, left. In the 1990s, Jouret, having given up his profession as a homeopath to devote himself fully to the OTS, began lecturing on personal development at various companies, universities and banks in several countries. Di Mambro, who had a dim view of these lectures, began sabotaging Jouret, who eventually abandoned his activities and became totally dependent on Di Mambro.

Di Mambro also believed his daughter Emmanuelle, the "cosmic child", to be under threat from the antichrist; he reportedly believed the antichrist was born to the Dutoit couple, though this interpretation has been disputed. Di Mambro had previously forbidden Nicky from having children following a miscarriage, but after she left the group, she and Antonio had a son, who they named Christopher Emmanuel. The Dutoits had invited Di Mambro to be the godfather of this child; Di Mambro was deeply offended by both the name similarity and the disobeying of his instructions. Di Mambro was also having health issues: he had kidney failure, diabetes, and became incontinent, having to wear diapers. He also told Thierry Huguenin that he had cancer. Compounding the difficulties, Di Mambro also began having issues with Emmanuelle. Though she had been raised from birth to be a messiah figure, by the age of 12 she had become uncooperative, rejecting her role in the group and taking an interest in typical teenage pop culture. Bellaton was also irritated with him using her home to throw parties without her permission; she also was engaging in a "non-cosmic" relationship with OTS member Patrick Vuarnet.

The concept of "transit" was first brought up by Di Mambro in 1990 or 1991. It was to mean a voluntary departure of the members to another dimension in space, or an act of consent to bring the "germ of life" to another planet. He told the members that they would be summoned on short notice, and would need to be ready as this could occur any day. They conceptualized the transit as a ritual involving magic fire, where they would undergo a spiritual voyage to the star Sirius. In March 1993, Jouret and several other members became embroiled in a gun scandal. Properties were raided by police in March of that year, and several members were arrested. Di Mambro and Jouret's original plan seemed to have been a mass suicide in the spring of 1993; following Jouret's arrest that year, plans for a "transit" were found on his computer. However, due to the esoteric language, the police failed to understand what the documents meant.

This original transit was intended to take place at a luxury house in the village of Saint-Sauveur in the Laurentians in Canada, where the OTS had an underground ceremonial crypt. After the police raid Di Mambro ordered OTS members to destroy the crypt and empty the house, viewing it as having been ruined by the intrusion; the transit plans were then postponed and moved to Switzerland. According to another interpretation, however, this may have only sped up their plans. In a tape likely dating to spring 1994, Jouret and Di Mambro discussed the Waco siege, saying that the Branch Davidians had "beaten us to the punch", with Di Mambro telling Jouret that "what we’ll do will be even more spectacular". He also ordered the Dutoit family to be murdered.

== Mass suicide ==
Di Mambro wrote four letters, known as The Testament, which contained messages of the order's beliefs. In these letters, the OTS termed the acts a "transit", which they described as "in no way a suicide in the human sense of the term". They declared that, upon death, they would acquire "solar bodies" on the star Sirius. The letters maintain a persecuted rhetoric. In one letter, they harshly criticize the allegations the OTS had received in several countries (Australia, Switzerland, Martinique, Canada, and France) as "deceitful", but especially complain about their SQ and the Q-37 investigation. They blamed their wish to leave the earth on systematic government persecution. On 30 September 1994, the Dutoits were lured to the chalet in Morin-Heights, having been invited to dinner by Bellaton. As ordered by Di Mambro, these murders were carried out in a ritualistic fashion. On 4 October the Genouds set incendiary timers to go off and, while wearing robes and medals, laid out on a bed, dying of asphyxiation from smoke inhalation when the fires began. According to telephone records, Di Mambro was informed of the success of the plan.

On 30 September, Di Mambro had a meal with some followers near Montreux in Switzerland; according to an attendee (Vuarnet) Di Mambro had asked him to meet them, including Jouret and Pilet. During the night from 2 to 3 October 1994, 23 died in Cheiry. The ones who had killed the others in Cheiry were Egger and Jouret, though it is possible they were not the only ones. Following the deaths in Cheiry, Jouret was recorded as calling Di Mambro, possibly to inform him that it had been a success, and shortly after so did Egger. On 3 October, Di Mambro was in Salvan; he, with several of the most faithful, were seen at a restaurant there. They were noted to have an "absent and sad air" and barely ate. By this time Di Mambro may have already had his son Elie killed as a "traitor", the first death in Salvan: his body was found alone, off to the side from the others. In a final, fifth note found in Di Mambro's chalet, blame for the Cheiry killings was shifted onto Jouret. Separately, the passports of Di Mambro and his wife were mailed to French Minister of the Interior Charles Pasqua.

25 were found dead in Granges-sur-Salvan. Most of the bodies in Salvan were burned beyond recognition, and Jouret and Di Mambro's bodies had to be identified via dental records. The dead had been injected with poison. According to the investigative report, it is likely that the fatal injections at Salvan were done by Line Lheureux. A note found on Di Mambro's body, written by him, declared: "Your Transit must be assured of total success, but that depends on you." According to the coroner report, Di Mambro died of the drugs he ingested prior to the fire. His body was found in the first chalet in Salvan, on the intermediate floor, near the body of Emmanuelle. Jocelyne Di Mambro died in a similar manner, her body found in a room of the upper floor of the same building.

Mostly in an attempt to discourage devoted former members from visiting their graves, the location of the graves of Jouret and Di Mambro were not officially released, with authorities describing it as "top secret". As neither of their families came to claim their bodies, they were both cremated following their autopsies. According to journalist Arnaud Bédat, who investigated the case, as the canton where the death occurred has jurisdiction in Switzerland, they were both buried secretly under an unmarked slab in a cemetery in Sion, Switzerland.

The Solar Temple disbanded after Di Mambro and Jouret's deaths, though in 1995 another group of 16 OTS members committed suicide and in 1997 five more followed, following the first group.
