= Castle of Arginy =

French castle

- Château d'Arginy
- Charentay, Rhône, Auvergne-Rhône-Alpes, France
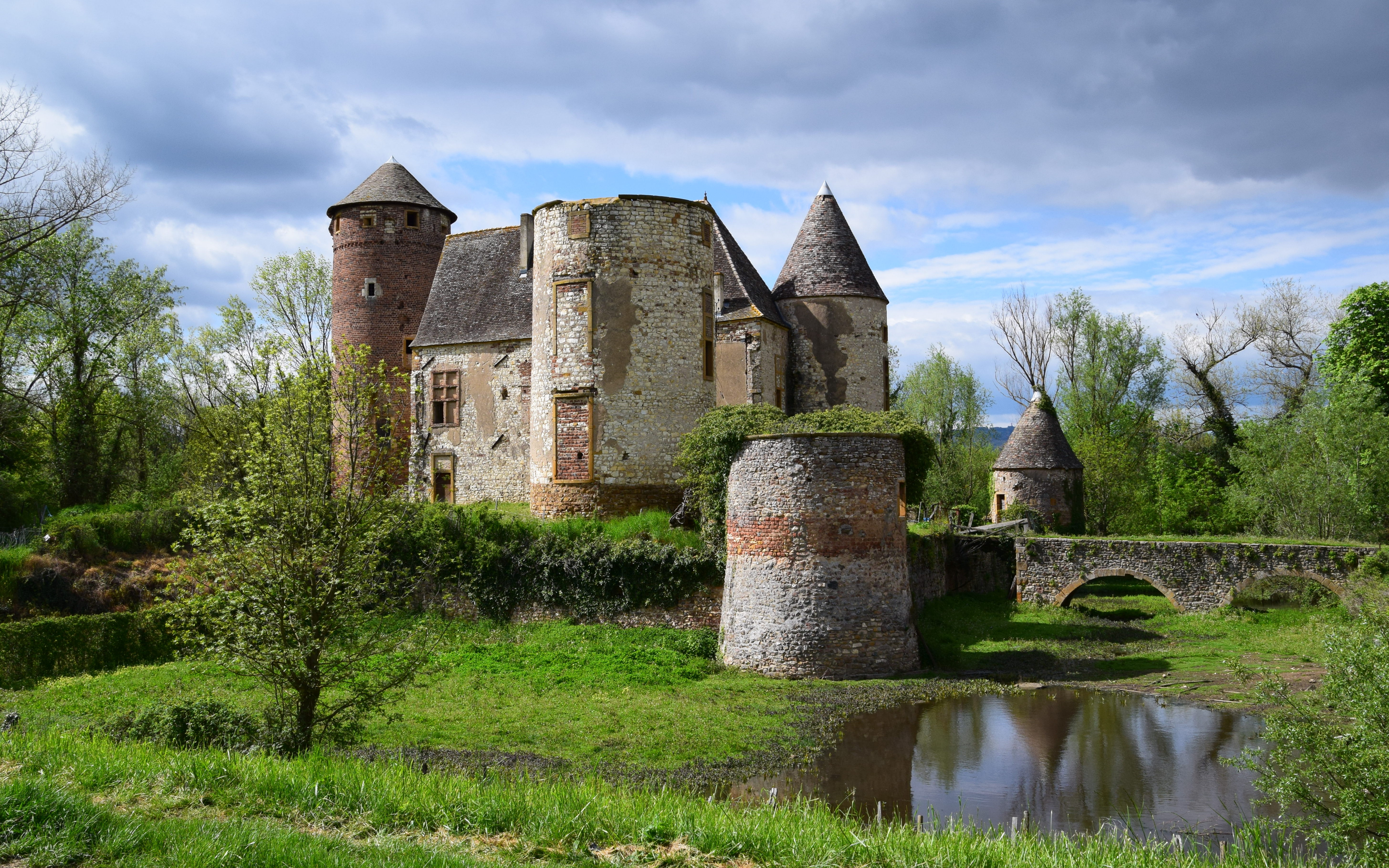
- Photo of the castle in 2016

Site information
- Type: Castle

Location
- Coordinates: 46.083°N 4.68948°E

Site history
- Built: 14th century

Garrison information
- Designations: Monument historique

The Castle of Arginy (French: Château d'Arginy) is a medieval French castle. It was built in the mid-14th century. It is located in the commune of Charentay, in the Rhône department of Auvergne-Rhône-Alpes, France. It is considered a partial historic monument by France. The castle is associated with Knights Templar legends.

== Description ==
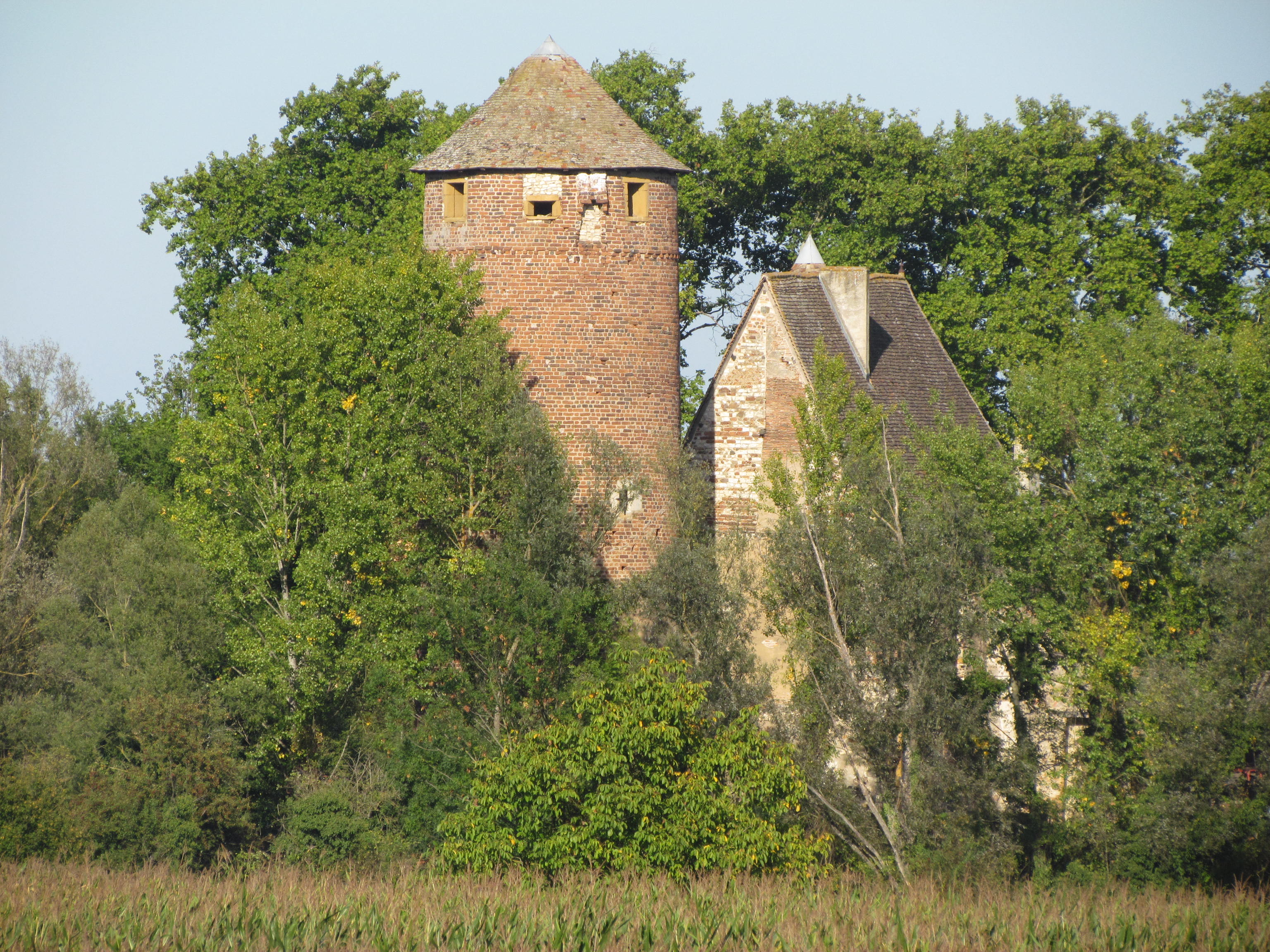
The castle in 2011

The castle is located in the commune of Charentay, in Auvergne-Rhône-Alpes, France. It is highly representative of building styles in the northern Lyonnais and Dombes regions.

The castle itself consisted of two concentric enclosures. The low, quadrangular outer enclosure was flanked by four circular turrets at the corners, and was built at the same time as the lower courtyard. The quadrangular inner enclosure, formed of dwellings arranged around a small courtyard is flanked by three round turrets. Only one wing of this enclosure remains, and only two turrets do. In the last corner, stands the brick master tower, built in the 13th century, cylindrical on the outside and octagonal on the inside.

== History ==
The castle was probably founded after the Beaujeu family sold the property to Guillaume du Vernet or Verneys, a member of the bourgeoisie from Montbrison. In 1374, Guichard de Verneys paid hommage at the castle. The du Vernet family owned it until either 1455 or the beginning of the 16th century, when it passed to various lower ranking families. In July 1974 the castle was decreed a partial historic monument (only the facades and roofs of the château and outbuildings, as well as the moat, are listed).

The castle is associated with legends of the medieval Knights Templar order. According to legend, the last Grand Master of the Order of the Temple, Jacques de Molay, received his nephew, Guichard de Beaujeu, in prison to ask him to hide the Templar treasure at Arginy. French esotericist Jacques Breyer lived in the castle for some time, where he claimed he had mystical experiences. Based on a document that he claimed to find, Breyer identified the castle as the place that Hugues de Payens had originally founded the Knights Templar; he searched for relics in the estates of de Beaujeau's relatives to prove this but none were ever found. He would later create a resurgence of neo-Templar groups after his experiences in the castle, called the "Arginy Renaissance".
