= Bibliography of the Order of the Solar Temple =

The Templar cross used by the OTS

Following the Order of the Solar Temple affair – a case that gained international notoriety when members of the group, a then-obscure neo-Templar group, orchestrated several mass suicides and mass murders in the 1990s – there have been several books and studies published about the events and organization. The case became a media sensation, with many conspiracy theories promoted by the media. As described by Susan J. Palmer, "false or unverifiable trails have been laid: secondhand testimonies are traded by journalists, ghost-written apostate memoirs are in progress and conspiracy theories abound." The OTS itself also published several writings espousing its beliefs.

Several academic studies have been published, focusing mostly on ideological aspects such as violence, leader charisma, and the concept of apocalypticism. Journalists also wrote books, such as Arnaud Bédat, Gilles Bouleau and Bernard Nicolas's 1996 work Les Chevaliers de la mort. The journalist Renaud Marhic also wrote a book on the case. Former members of the group also wrote memoirs, including Thierry Huguenin's Le 54e and Hermann Delorme's Crois et meurs dans l'Ordre du temple solaire. The first book on the OTS, Vie et Mort de l'Ordre du Temple Solaire, written by journalist Raphaël Aubert and theologian Carl-A. Keller, was published only two months after the first deaths.

== OTS publications ==
=== Survivre à l'An 2000 ===
- Les Cahiers de Sarah: Survivre à l'An 2000 (in French). Toronto: Éditions Atlanta. 1986. ISBN 2-9800811-0-8, ISBN 2-9800811-1-6.

Name translated as, variously, 'How to Survive the Year 2000', 'Survival Beyond the Year 2000', or 'Surviving the Year 2000'.

Published in two volumes in Toronto by the OTS's Éditions Atlanta, it was originally intended as a series but only ever had the two volumes. It is prefaced by Jouret, Jacques Breyer, and Christian Pechot. The first volume tells of the group's occultist doctrine. It compares the apocalypse with Atlantis, and predicts that the ultimate apocalypse will happen before 1999 and be foretold by signs in the sky. It also teaches of the coming of a "solar race". The second, 150 pages long, is a guide on how to survive the apocalypse, going over what to store and how to do first aid, and how to survive nuclear, chemical and bacteriological attacks.

The second volume opens with a claimed letter from Nostradamus, and mixes scientific writings with a plethora of occultist and science fiction writers. The first aid information is largely copied from Red Cross and NATO manuals. It has been seen as evidencing the group's survivalist nature, and how they had initially had an optimistic message. Jean-François Mayer noted that "nothing in these volumes would lead one to suspect suicidal tendencies; to the contrary, it seemed as if the adepts hoped to find themselves among those who survived the apocalypse unscathed." Massimo Introvigne noted the second volume as being written "in the style of American survivalist literature."

=== The Templar Tradition in the Age of Aquarius ===
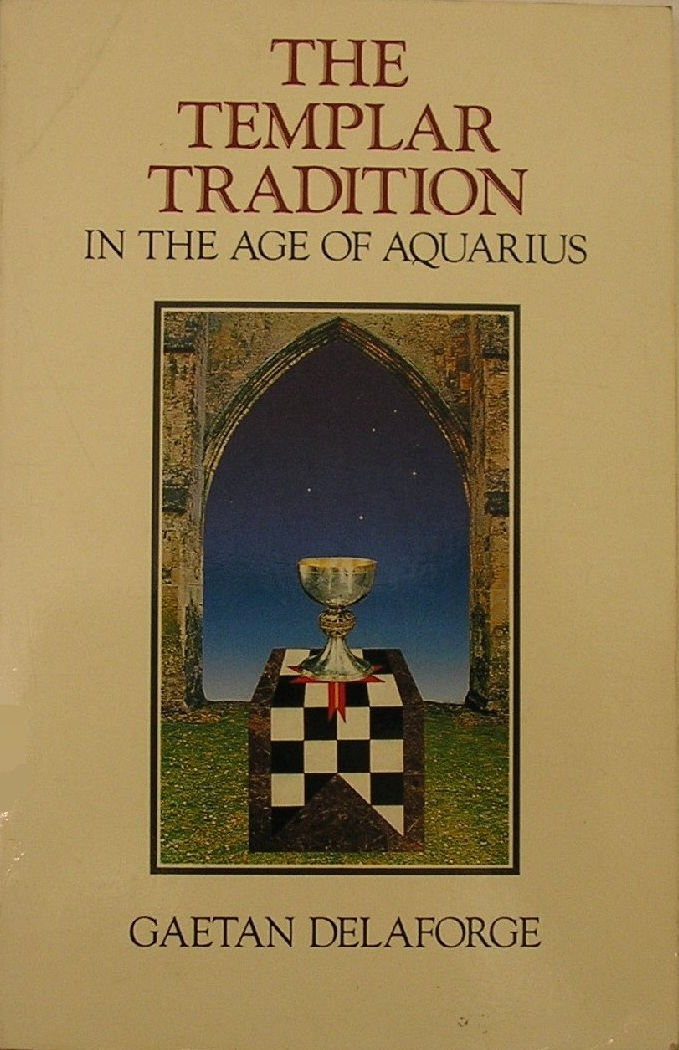
Cover of The Templar Tradition in the Age of Aquarius, produced to spread the OTS's beliefs

- Delaforge, Gaetan (1987). The Templar Tradition in the Age of Aquarius. Putney: Threshold Books. ISBN 0-939660-17-2.

Written in English under the pseudonym Gaetan Delaforge. The person behind the pseudonym is a North American OTS member who survived and later defected. It was published in the United States by Threshold Books in 1987, to spread the order's Templar ideas into the United States. The book argues that the Templars survived to the modern day, and that the OTS was its ultimate successor. It was dispersed throughout occult and theosophical circles. Introvigne described it as a "curious book". It spread false claims about the excavation of supposed Templar treasure, and was traced as the source of these claims by one historian. These claims are unsourced and were described by writer Joel Levy as "almost certainly pure invention".

The same year, "Gaetan Delaforge" also wrote the article "The Templar Tradition: Yesterday and Today", which appeared in the Winter 1987-1988 issue, issue 6, of the magazine Gnosis.

== Academic literature ==
Books and book chapters written by academic authors.

=== English ===
- Bogdan, Henrik (2014). "The Order of the Solar Temple". In Lewis, James R.; Petersen, Jesper Aa. (eds.). Controversial New Religions (2nd ed.). New York: Oxford University Press. pp. 286–301. ISBN 978-0-19-931531-4.
- —— (2014). "Purification, Illumination, and Death: The Murder-Suicides of the Order of the Solar Temple". In Lewis, James R.; Cusack, Carole M. (eds.). Sacred Suicide. Ashgate New Religions. Farnham: Ashgate. pp. 55–71. ISBN 978-1-4094-5086-3.
- Bromley, David G.; Melton, J. Gordon, eds. (2002). Cults, Religion, and Violence. Cambridge University Press. ISBN 978-0-521-66064-8.
- Clusel, Shannon; Palmer, Susan J. (2020). "The Solar Temple in Quebec and the Saint-Casimir "Transit"". In Palmer, Susan J.; Geoffroy, Martin; Gareau, Paul L. (eds.). The Mystical Geography of Quebec: Catholic Schisms and New Religious Movements. Palgrave Studies in New Religions and Alternative Spiritualities. Cham: Palgrave Macmillan. pp. 217–245. ISBN 978-3-030-33061-3.
- Côté, Pauline, ed. (2001). Chercheurs de dieux dans l'espace public - Frontier Religions in Public Space. Actexpress (in English and French). University of Ottawa Press. doi:10.1353/book.12414. ISBN 978-2-7603-2693-4. ISSN 1480-4743.
- Daniels, Ted (1999). "The Order of the Solar Temple". A Doomsday Reader: Prophets, Predictors, and Hucksters of Salvation. New York University Press. pp. 144–153. ISBN 978-0-8147-1909-1.
- Hall, John R.; Schuyler, Philip D.; Trinh, Sylvaine (2000). Apocalypse Observed: Religious Movements and Violence in North America, Europe, and Japan. New York: Routledge. ISBN 978-0-203-97766-8.
- Introvigne, Massimo (2000). "The Magic of Death: The Suicides of the Solar Temple". In Wessinger, Catherine (ed.). Millennialism, Persecution, and Violence: Historical Cases. Syracuse University Press. pp. 138–157. ISBN 978-0-8156-0599-7.
- Lewis, James R. (2004). "The Solar Temple "Transits": Beyond the Millennialist Hypothesis". In Lewis, James R.; Petersen, Jesper Aagaard (eds.). Controversial New Religions (1st ed.). New York: Oxford University Press. pp. 295–317. ISBN 978-0-19-515682-9.
- ——, ed. (2006). The Order of the Solar Temple: The Temple of Death. Controversial New Religions. Aldershot: Ashgate. ISBN 978-0-7546-5285-4.
- ——, ed. (2011). Violence and New Religious Movements. New York: Oxford University Press. ISBN 978-0-19-973563-1.
- Mayer, Jean-François (2014). "The Order of the Solar Temple: From Apocalypse to Court". In Richardson, James T.; Bellanger, François (eds.). Legal Cases, New Religious Movements, and Minority Faiths. Ashgate Inform Series on Minority Religions and Spiritual Movements. Farnham: Ashgate. pp. 38–54. ISBN 978-1-4724-2874-5.
- Richardson, James T., ed. (2004). Regulating Religion: Case Studies from Around the Globe. Critical Issues in Social Justice. New York: Kluwer Academic/Plenum Publishers. ISBN 978-0-306-47887-1.
- Walliss, John (2004). Apocalyptic Trajectories: Millenarianism and Violence in the Contemporary World. Oxford: Peter Lang. ISBN 978-3-03910-290-7.
- Wessinger, Catherine (2000). "Other Cases Briefly Considered: Solar Temple and Heaven's Gate". How the Millennium Comes Violently: From Jonestown to Heaven's Gate. New York: Seven Bridges Press. pp. 218–252. ISBN 978-1-889119-24-3.

=== Non-English ===
- Abgrall, Jean-Marie (1999). "L'Ordre du Temple solaire". Les sectes de l'apocalypse: gourous de l'an 2000 (in French). Paris: Calmann-Lévy. pp. 171–207. ISBN 2-7021-2954-4.
- Caillet, Serge (1997). L'Ordre rénové du Temple: Aux racines du Temple solaire (in French). Paris: Dervy. ISBN 978-2-85076-924-5.
- Campiche, Roland J. (1995). Quand les sectes affolent: Ordre du Temple Solaire, médias et fin de millénaire (in French). Geneva: Labor et Fides. ISBN 978-2-8309-0794-0.
- Côté, Pauline, ed. (2001). Chercheurs de dieux dans l'espace public - Frontier Religions in Public Space. Actexpress (in English and French). University of Ottawa Press. doi:10.1353/book.12414. ISBN 978-2-7603-2693-4. ISSN 1480-4743.
- Haefliger, Stéphane (1996). La société d'excommunication: Salvan, les médias et l'Ordre du Temple solaire (in French). Sierre: Monographic. ISBN 978-2-88341-055-8.
- Introvigne, Massimo (1995). Idee che uccidono: Jonestown, Waco, il Tempio Solare (in Italian). Milan: Mimep-Docete. ISBN 88-86242-10-7.
- —— (1996). Les Veilleurs de l'Apocalypse: Millénarisme et nouvelles religions au seuil de l'an 2000 (in French). Paris: Claire Vigne. ISBN 978-2-84193-024-1.
- Maniscalco, Maria Luisa (1999). L'ultimo passo insieme: I suicidi collettivi dell'Ordine del tempio solare (in Italian). Rome: Philos. ISBN 88-86589-14-X.
- Mayer, Jean-François (1996). Les Mythes du Temple Solaire (in French). Geneva: Georg. ISBN 2-8257-0554-3.
- —— (1999). "Les chevaliers de l'Apocalypse : l'Ordre du Temple Solaire et ses adeptes". In Champion, Françoise; Cohen, Martine (eds.). Sectes et Démocratie (in French). Paris: Éditions du Seuil. pp. 205–223. ISBN 2-02-031209-3.

== Journalism ==
Books written by journalists.

- Aubert, Raphaël; Keller, Carl-A. (1994). Vie et Mort de l'Ordre du Temple Solaire (in French). Vevey: Éd. de l'Aire Éd. Jouvence. ISBN 978-2-88353-080-5.
- Bédat, Arnaud; Bouleau, Gilles; Nicolas, Bernard (1996). Les Chevaliers de la mort: Enquête et révélations sur l'Ordre du Temple Solaire (in French). Montreal: TF1 Éditions. ISBN 978-2-89111-707-4.
- ——; ——; —— (2000). L'Ordre du Temple solaire: Les Secrets d'une manipulation (in French). Paris: Flammarion. ISBN 978-2-08-067842-3.
- Cohen, David (2004). Diana: Death of a Goddess. London: Century. ISBN 1-84413-795-3.
- Chaumeil, Jean-Luc (2001). L'Affaire de l'ordre du Temple solaire: Le dossier secret (in French). Benfeld: ACM Édition. ISBN 978-2-84087-116-3.
- Facon, Roger (1995). Vérité et révélations sur l'ordre du Temple solaire: Opération Faust, chronique d'un massacre annoncé (in French). Brussels: Savoir pour Être. ISBN 978-2-87387-068-3.
- —— (2023). Les Templiers du Feu (in French). Saint-Nazaire-en-Royans: Energeia. ISBN 979-10-93492-60-5.
- Fusier, Maurice (2003). Des Mots qui font des morts: Le proces Tabachnik et le Temple Solaire (in French). Bursinel: Pandora Publishing. ISBN 978-2-9700386-0-3.
- —— (2006). Secret d'Etat ? Enquête au cœur d'une secte... Ordre du Temple solaire... (in French). Brignais: Editions des Traboules. ISBN 978-2-915681-16-1.
- —— (2010). O.T.S.: l'impossible procès (in French). Brignais: Editions des Traboules. ISBN 978-2-915681-87-1.
- Leleu, Christophe (1995). La Secte du Temple Solaire: Explications autour d'un massacre (in French). Paris: Claire Vigne. ISBN 978-2-84193-004-3.
- Marhic, Renaud (1995). Enquête sur les extrémistes de l'occulte: de la loge P2 à l'ordre du temple solaire (in French). Bordeaux: Horizon Chimérique. ISBN 978-2-907202-56-5.
  - —— (1996). L'Ordre du Temple Solaire: Enquête sur les extrémistes de l'Occulte II (in French). Bordeaux: Horizon Chimérique. ISBN 2-907202-58-8. An expanded second edition.
- Vailly, René de (1995). La vérité sur l'Ordre du Temple Solaire (in French). Outremont: Les Éd. Qubecour. ISBN 978-2-7640-0005-2.

== Memoirs ==
Books written by those with personal involvement in the OTS, either as an ex-member or a relative of a member.

- Dauvergne, Charles (2008). Temple Solaire, un ex-dignitaire parle: Vingt ans au soleil du Temple (in French). Paris: Desclée de Brouwer. ISBN 978-2-220-06036-1.
- Delorme, Hermann (1996). Crois et meurs dans l'Ordre du temple solaire (in French). Saint-Alphonse-de-Granby: Editions de la Paix. ISBN 2-921255-43-X.
- Guillaume, Denis (1997). Luc Jouret toujours vivant! (in French). Saint-Zénon: Louise Courteau Éditrice. ISBN 2-89239-194-6.
- Huguenin, Thierry (1995). Le 54e (in French). Paris: Fixot. ISBN 978-2-221-08045-0.
- Jaton, Rose-Marie (1999). Ordre du temple solaire: En quête de vérité (in French). Geneva: Slatkine. ISBN 978-2-05-101785-5.
- Tabachnik, Michel (1997). Bouc émissaire: dans le piège du Temple solaire (in French). Paris: Michel Lafon. ISBN 978-2-84098-308-8.
- Vuarnet, Alain (2007). Ma rage de vivre: Un destin dans la tourmente de l'Ordre du Temple solaire (in French). Monaco: Éditions du Rocher. ISBN 978-2-268-06268-6.
- Vuarnet, Jean (1996). Lettre à ceux qui ont tué ma femme et mon fils (in French). Paris: Fixot. ISBN 978-2-286-10270-8.

== Journal articles ==
- Haught, James A. (1995). "And Now, the Solar Temple". Free Inquiry. 15 (1): 31. ISSN 0272-0701.
- Introvigne, Massimo (July 1995). "Ordeal by Fire: The Tragedy of the Solar Temple". Religion. 25 (3): 267–283. doi:10.1006/reli.1995.0023. ISSN 0048-721X.
- Krompecher, T; Brandt-Casadevall, C; Horisberger, B; Perrier, M; Zollinger, U (June 2000). "The challenge of identification following the tragedy of the Solar Temple (Cheiry/Salvan, Switzerland)". Forensic Science International. 110 (3): 215–226. doi:10.1016/S0379-0738(00)00176-6. ISSN 1875-1741.
- Mayer, Jean-François (January 1993). "Des Templiers pour l'Ere du Verseau: les Clubs Archédia (1984–1991) et l'Ordre international chevaleresque Tradition Solaire". Mouvements Religieux (in French) (153): 2–10. ISSN 0242-7931.
- Mayer, Jean-François (April 1999). ""Our Terrestrial Journey is Coming to an End": The Last Voyage of the Solar Temple". Nova Religio. 2 (2). Translated by Siegler, Elijah: 172–196. doi:10.1525/nr.1999.2.2.172. ISSN 1092-6690.
- Palmer, Susan J. (October 1996). "Purity and Danger in the Solar Temple". Journal of Contemporary Religion. 11 (3): 303–318. doi:10.1080/13537909608580777. ISSN 1353-7903.
- Rouiller, Sybille; Gilbert, Philippe; Baumgartner, Aline (2024). "Dépasser « l'irrationnel » avec la pensée critique : l'Ordre du Temple Solaire (OTS) comme étude de cas en sciences des religions" [Overcoming the "irrational" with critical thinking: the Order of the Solar Temple (OTS) as a case study in religious studies]. Zeitschrift für Religionskunde / Revue de didactique des sciences des religions (in French) (12): 117–136. doi:10.26034/fr.zfrk.2024.4702. ISSN 2297-6469.

== Documentaries ==
- Cohen, David; Brown, David Carr (8 October 1995). "Death of the Solar Temple". Witness. Channel 4.
- Giguère, Nicole (1997). Aller simple pour Sirius (Television production) (in Canadian French). Verseau International.
- Boisset, Yves (2005). Les Mystères sanglants de l'OTS (Television production). Infrarouge (in French). France 2.
- Brénéol, Nicolas; Rouiller, Raphaël (2022). Temple Solaire: l'enquête impossible (Television production) (in French). TMC.
- Lemasson, Éric; Georgeault, Eric; Ledu, Lionel; Bequet, Annie-Claude (21 March 1996). "Soleil trompeur". Envoyé spécial. Episode 244 (in French). France 2.
- Joucla, Bruno (2022). La Secte (Television production) (in Swiss French). Salto.
- Morath, Pierre; Lemasson, Éric (February 2023). La Fraternité (Television production) (in Swiss French). Radio Télévision Suisse.

== Reports ==
- Mayer, Jean-François (13 November 1998). Apocalyptic Millennialism in the West: The Case of the Solar Temple (Report). Critical Incident Analysis Group at the University of Virginia.
- Michaud, Roger C. (June 1996). Ordre du Temple solaire: rapport d'investigation du coroner au sujet des décès survenus à Morin Heights et en relation avec ceux survenus à Cheiry et à Salvan: liste des décès dans le Vercors (France) (Report) (in Canadian French). Montreal: Bureau du coroner.
- Naud, Yvon (8 October 1997). Rapport d'investigation du Coroner (Report) (in Canadian French). Montreal: Bureau du coroner.
