= Trial of Michel Tabachnik =

French court case

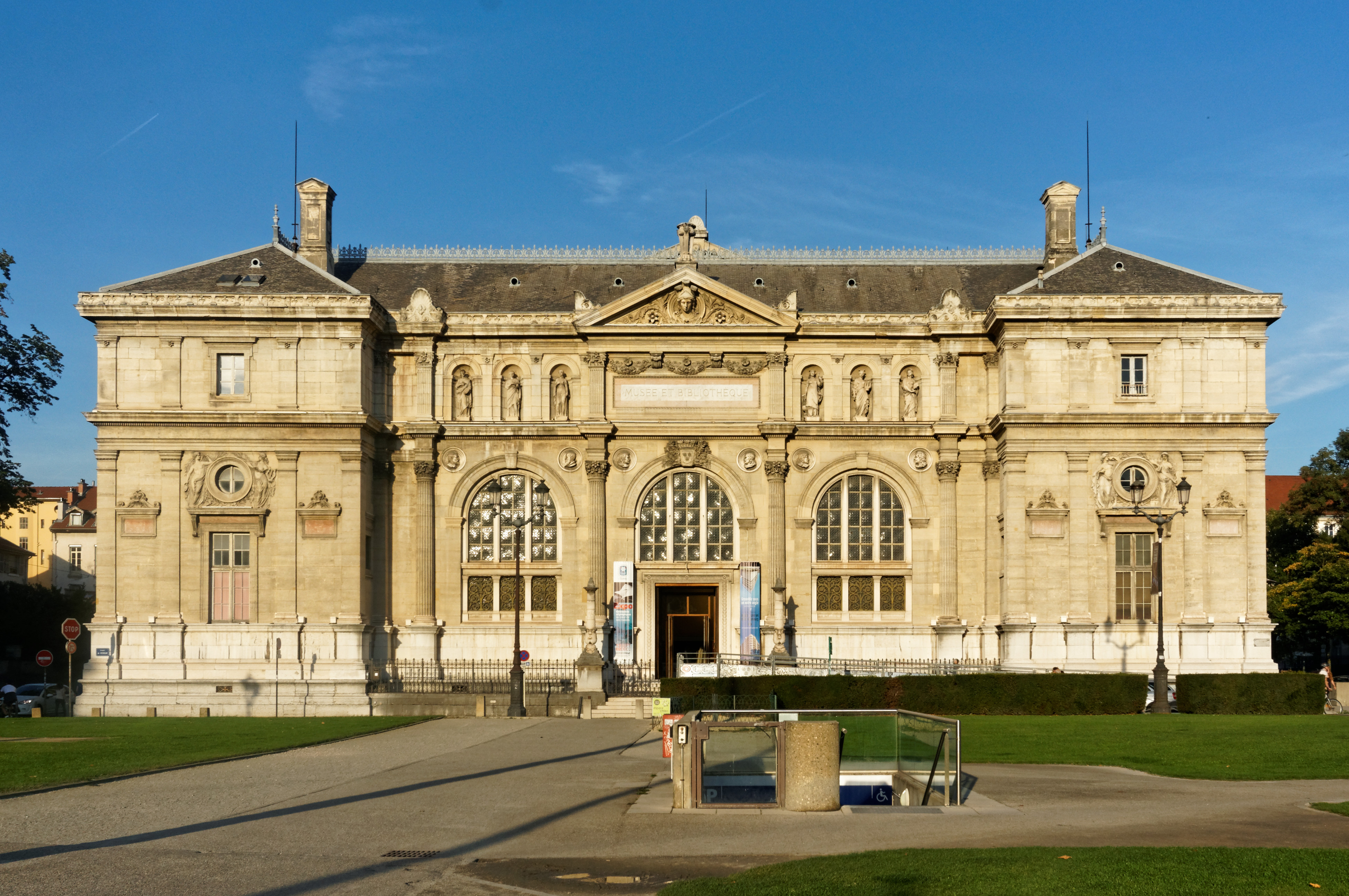
- Grenoble's former museum-library, the location of the 2001 trial
- Court: Grenoble criminal court
- Started: June 12, 1996
- Decided: June 25, 2001; 25 years ago
- Verdict: Michel Tabachnik found not guilty on all counts
- Charge: Conspiracy to commit murder; Participation in a criminal association

Case history
- Subsequent actions: Appealed; again found not guilty in December 2006

In 2001 Swiss composer and orchestral conductor Michel Tabachnik was tried in the Grenoble criminal court, over his involvement in the Order of the Solar Temple (OTS) religious movement. The Solar Temple was an esoteric and eclectic new religious movement and secret society, often described as a cult, that had been involved in several high profile mass-murder suicides in the 1990s. Tabachnik was accused of brainwashing the followers into the suicides and having known about the plans beforehand. Tabachnik was the only person tried in the aftermath of the Solar Temple deaths; he was found not guilty in the 2001 trial and in the 2006 appeal trial.

Tabachnik had been involved in the movement since 1977, and had written Les Archées, some of their higher level esoteric texts. He was highly involved in its early years, but had gradually moved away from the order in the years prior to the suicides. Following the first suicide, Tabachnik's involvement was realized by investigators, and he was interviewed by the Swiss police. The Swiss investigations did not establish any connection between Tabachnik and the 1994 deaths, and his involvement in the group then received little public notice. After the second mass suicide in France in 1995, several journalists implicated Tabachnik in the deaths, accusing him of being more involved than had been suggested and saying the group had reunified behind him. The examining magistrate into the second set of deaths, Luc Fontaine, placed him under investigation on 12 June 1996.

He was charged with conspiracy to commit murder and participation in a criminal association, with prosecutors arguing that his writings had brainwashed the followers into the suicides and that he had known about the plans for mass suicide beforehand. Tabachnik was defended by Francis Szpiner and Carolyn Toby. Tabachnik was found not guilty on 25 June 2001 on the basis that there had been no significant or conclusive proof uncovered that Tabachnik had orchestrated the killings, and his writings were deemed unlikely to have influenced the members. The public prosecutor appealed the criminal court's decision, and an appeal trial was scheduled, but delayed repeatedly. In a second trial from 24 October from 30 October 2006, the appeals court upheld the lower court's ruling, and Tabachnik was acquitted a second time in December 2006. The failure to convict Tabachnik disappointed French politicians and the anti-cult movement. Several family members of the dead were also unsatisfied, not entirely because they believed Tabachnik was guilty, but for some of them due to their belief in outside involvement in the killings.

== Background ==
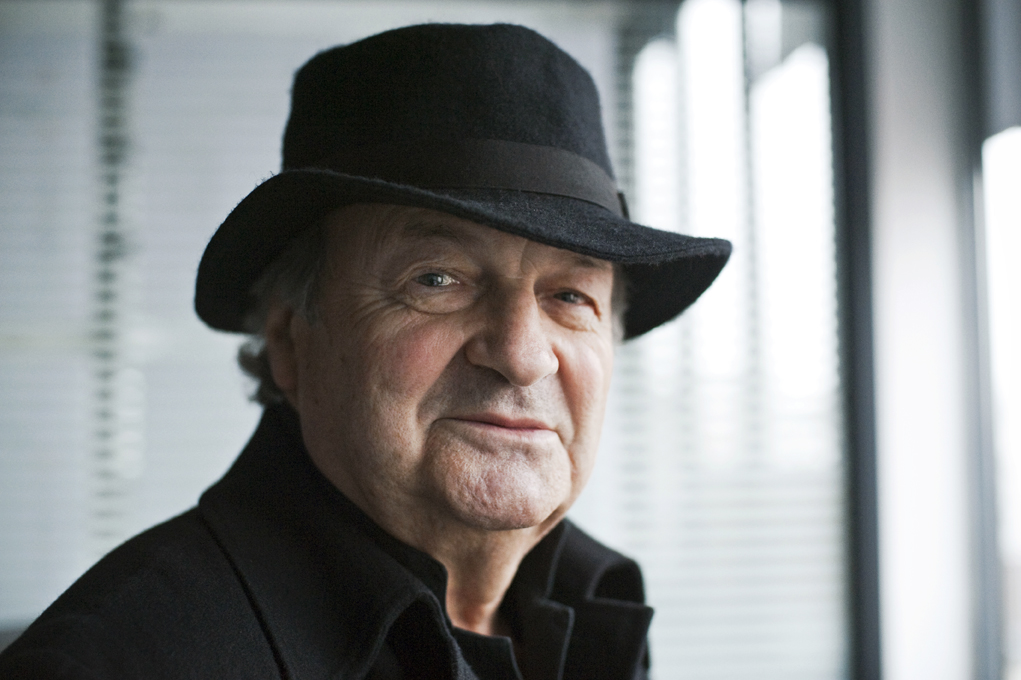
Tabachnik in 2010

Michel Tabachnik, born 1942, is a well-known Swiss composer and orchestral conductor who had an interest in esoteric philosophy. In June 1977, Tabachnik had met Joseph Di Mambro, the creator of a spiritual commune called La Pyramide. In 1981, he became the president of the Golden Way Foundation, another communal group created by Di Mambro in 1978. Later that year, Di Mambro invited as a speaker to the Golden Way Luc Jouret, by whom Di Mambro was charmed and who rose rapidly within the ranks of the organization once he joined.

In 1984, Di Mambro and Jouret founded the Order of the Solar Temple (OTS) a religious group active in several French-speaking countries, led by Di Mambro and Jouret. It was a neo-Templar secret society with eclectic beliefs sourced from many different movements like Rosicrucianism, Theosophy, and the New Age. That year, Tabachnik moved with his wife to Canada, soon followed by Di Mambro. He had been highly involved with the OTS in its early years, but had moved away from it in the years before the suicides.

Within the framework of the OTS, Tabachnik wrote Les Archées, esoteric texts that circulated within the OTS. These writings included 21 esoteric texts written between 1985 and 1992, which were distributed among the higher up members of the OTS. They incorporated many traditions and systems of thought, including Kabbalah, astrophysics, and alchemy. Tabachnik's teachings within the group were extremely obscure, and in one recorded meeting of OTS members, those who listened to a talk given by him stated that they did not know what he was talking about.

=== Mass suicides and murders ===
Following several difficulties experienced by the group, including investigations and ex-member criticism, the leaders planning a of "transit"; the idea of a "voluntary departure of templars to another dimension in space". They conceptualized the transit as a ritual involving magic fire, where they would undergo a spiritual voyage to the star Sirius. Following his drift from the group, a few months before the suicides he reconnected with it. In September 1994, Tabachnik announced the end of the OTS in two meetings in Avignon at Di Mambro's request, what were the last meetings. He was the keynote speaker and was also involved in a ritual. In October 1994, the first transit killed 53 people, 48 in Switzerland and five in Canada; several of the dead did not consent to death or were directly murdered for being "traitors". Following these suicides, the group became internationally notorious.

It was later said that Tabachnik had indeed taken part in these conferences, but without knowing the plans, and that it had been a set-up by Di Mambro. At the time of the deaths, Tabachnik was in concert in Denmark. Due to documents found related to the group, the police were able to understand the workings of the community and recognize some of its members, including Tabachnik. As a result, he was interrogated by the Swiss police for several hours, but this was not made public. Despite his links to the group, he was not otherwise accused and this escaped public notice at the time of the first deaths. The Swiss investigations did not establish any connection between Tabachnik and the 1994 deaths. In December 1995, 16 more members of the OTS would commit mass suicide, this time in France; a third suicide occurred in March 1997, where five members killed themselves, though in this case they spared their three children.

The investigation into the Vercors deaths was headed by judge Luc Fontaine, the examining magistrate of Grenoble. Previously a prosecutor in Bonneville, he had only been in the position for a month. The investigation ultimately concluded that the two members of the group had killed the others and then themselves. This theory was reconstructed with animal remains and was agreed to be conclusive. They concluded that there was no external involvement in the massacre on the grounds of a lack of evidence. Fontaine's investigation was criticized at the time due to this decision. The investigation was done with limited resources, and Fontaine was not relieved of his other cases while investigating, which displeased the civil parties in the case. Some believed in outside involvement, particularly Alain Leclerc, the lawyer for several of the civil parties in the case, and the relatives of several of the dead, who believed that the actual perpetrators had escaped and had never been caught.

== Initial investigation ==
Following the Vercors deaths, on 23 December 1995, during the Journal de 13 heures program on the French channel TF1, journalist Gilles Bouleau claimed that the group had survived and united behind Tabachnik, indirectly declaring that Tabachnik was the mastermind behind the Vercors massacre. Later, Swiss journalist Arnaud Bédat acquired photos claimed to directly implicate Tabachnik in the OTS's actions. This information was picked up by the media, leading Tabachnik to give a public denial. Tabachnik initially minimized his role and denied having been close to Di Mambro, but was eventually forced to admit that he had been a close associate, resulting in increased suspicion on him and his name making headline news in association with the case.

There was less proof tying Tabachnik to the 1995 deaths than the earlier suicides, as Tabachnik had no involvement with any of the dead. Fontaine needed to try someone, and Tabachnik was investigated following the incident. Fontaine placed him under examination on 12 June 1996 for conspiracy. At the time of the investigation, due to the death of the two leaders in Salvan in 1994, Tabachnik was the only defendant in the case. Fontaine considered that Tabachnik, through his writings and his conferences, could have incited followers to commit suicide. He was therefore charged with participation in a criminal conspiracy.

In his defense, Tabachnik published the book Bouc émissaire: Dans le piège du Temple Solaire, with a preface by Pierre Boulez. On 11 July 2000, following an examination of his writings, Fontaine decided that there was enough evidence against Tabachnik to bring the case to trial. Fontaine suspected that Tabachnik had known that the deaths were being prepared. Additionally, the writings were alleged to have brainwashed the members. Tabachnik denied that he had any prior knowledge of the deaths, claiming he had only occasionally spoken at OTS conferences. He admitted to having been a member of the group, though he had initially denied it. Another member of the group, Claude Giron, a pharmacist, was also indicted for criminal conspiracy in February 1997, as he was suspected of supplying the drugs used in the killings to the group. The case against him was dismissed in July of that year.

Fontaine was interviewed in the 2000 book L'Ordre du Temple solaire: Les Secrets d'une manipulation, by Bédat, Bouleau, and Bernard Nicholas. As a result, Tabachnik's lawyer Francis Szpiner requested Fontaine be removed from the case on 28 February 2000. They claimed his statements within the book, which had discussed his legal processes and rationale for trying Tabachnik, were a violation of legal secrecy. This was rejected by judge Barillon.

== First trial ==
He was tried in 2001 by the Grenoble criminal court for conspiracy to commit murder and participation in a criminal association. On 13 April 2001, at the Grenoble Museum-Library, which had been transformed for the occasion, the trial began. Tabachnik was defended by Francis Szpiner. Also defending was Carolyn Toby. They painted him as a scapegoat of the justice system. The plaintiffs' side split into two camps; one camp, led by Alain Vuarnet, son and brother of Édith and Patrick Vuarnet, felt that the trial should not focus on Tabachnik's responsibility but on the investigation itself, which they felt had not been thorough. Alain Leclerc, a Paris lawyer, defended the families of several of the dead, including the Vuarnets. The other camp was led by the anti-cult group UNADFI who believed that Tabachnik and his writings were the cause of the mass suicides, and that cults must be eradicated.

On the seventh day of the trial, several former OTS members took the stand and testified. Among the testimonies given, some were shocked and angry at the group and the acts committed, while others remained faithful to Di Mambro and to the transit to Sirius. On the eighth day, Tabachnik was interviewed and told of having been manipulated and fooled by Di Mambro. On the tenth day, the prosecutor demanded 5 years' imprisonment for Tabachnik's alleged role in the conditioning of the Temple's followers. The prosecutors said that Tabachnik's participation in the Avignon meetings was a sign of wrongdoing. The prosecution painted him as one of the higher ups of the organization; the psychiatrist Jean-Marie Abgrall, called as an expert for the trial, said that Tabachnik's influence within the group was unclear. Szpiner argued that by the time the records showed the massacre was being planned, Tabachnik was no longer participating in the OTS.

During the trial Tabachnik was questioned for two hours about his writings prepared for the OTS. The prosecution said they had been used to condition and brainwash the members of the OTS into their beliefs and their deaths. When questioned, he declared that they were merely "amateur" writings, a set of notes that had been read to Di Mambro that he had liked and decided to make high-level teachings of the group. During the trial, no one could figure out what the texts, called "indecipherable", were supposed to mean. The prosecution claimed that they contained themes that were used to justify the massacre, speaking of a "transition" and "secret masters" on Sirius.

Abgrall argued that the writings had helped condition the members into the suicides, as they made the members believe themselves part of an elite group, thus creating a "homicidal dynamic". Through this, Tabachnik was viewed as responsible. Abgrall later nuanced this interpretation during the trial and said his own interpretation of the texts was up for debate. Tabachnik said the writings had been symbolic, and that he had never imagined that anything in them could be used to justify death. Szpiner said the excerpts presented by the prosecution were "snippets" that had been "cut and pasted" out of context. Tabachnik had also been paid 192,135 Swiss francs from a company in Panama as payment for these writings; when asked by the judge if this had been fraud, he said that this money was for production costs for the writings and that he had already been cleared by the Swiss courts on this count. During the trial, Leclerc argued that the killings had actually been committed for political and financial reasons; this was unsuccessful.

On 25 June 2001, the court acquitted Tabachnik. The writings were deemed unlikely to have influenced the members, and there had been no significant or conclusive proof uncovered that Tabachnik had orchestrated the killings. Due to this, the benefit of the doubt was given to the accused. Alongside this the judge threw out three civil suits put forward by the relatives of the dead.

== Appeals and trial delays ==
Several family members of the dead OTS members were unsatisfied, some due to their belief in outside involvement in the killings. UNADFI also disagreed with the court decision, not because they believed in outside involvement, but believed Tabachnik was at fault. UNADFI was actively against the outside involvement theory, viewing it as detracting from the cult aspect of the case. As a result, the public prosecutor of the magistrates' court appealed the court's decision.

The appeal trial was repeatedly delayed. It was first scheduled for September 2003, but that year it was requested to be postponed following a criminal investigation into expert Abgrall over violations of investigation confidentiality. Jean-Luc Chaumeil, another investigator and journalist, was investigated for the same reason, in his case in addition to making comments viewed as attempting to influence witnesses and the court decision and the "unauthorized use of a title attached to a profession regulated by the public authority". In both cases this was in relation to books they had published about the case, which incorporated elements of the official court file to which they attached their own interpretation. Both were indicted in June 2002. Abgrall protested that this was being done by Leclerc to silence those who disagreed with him, while Chaumeil accused Leclerc of working for the family of Jacques Breyer to spoil the case; Leclerc accused them of secretly defending Tabachnik. Leclerc also launched an investigation into Abgrall's finances, which revealed that he had been paid tens of thousands of euros by a group called Landmark Education, deemed a cult, while he had been serving as an expert on the board of the anti-cult group MILS. This resulted in Abgrall's resignation from MILS and his being removed as an expert on the Tabachnik case.

In the run-up to the second trial, the civil parties filed a civil action. Vuarnet and Leclerc asked for the trial to be postponed so the investigation could be reopened over a new export report they had that showed excess traces of phosphorus on the bodies, which they mentioned at the opening of the trial in September. They claimed there were a number of inconsistencies in the investigation, such as the fact that the organic environment around the bodies of the dead was intact and showed no trace of fire. The civil party then asked for counter-expertise and questioned the theory of mass suicide. They, led by Alain Vuarnet, hoped to prove that Fontaine's investigation had been mistaken, and that the followers had actually been murdered by outside forces. At their request, forensics expert Gilbert Lavoué was asked to extract traces of phosphorus from the exhumed remains (the test was requested to be conducted by the court, but this was rejected so it was done privately).

The bodies were found to contain excess phosphorus, which Alain Vuarnet claimed was a sign that they had actually been executed with a flamethrower. The appeal trial was postponed to 14 June 2004, though the prosecutor's office said the phosphorus theory had been previously rejected in 2001. In the end, the forensic experts considered that this analysis added nothing new to the case and did not call into question Judge Fontaine's decision. UNAFDI's lawyer argued this theory was irrational, and that the families wanted to believe it because it gave a rational explanation where none existed. It was postponed again to June 2005.

== Second trial ==
Tabachnik was tried again in a second trial beginning 24 October 2006. The appeal of the prosecutor against the first acquittal did not ask for his conviction or acquittal, and did not argue for him being guilty or innocent. The prosecutor also stated that he did not appear to be an important member of the group and they had no proof to the contrary. Tabachnik's lawyer argued his works were "esoteric ramblings" that could not have inspired the group's violence; he said that to punish him for "wild" ideas would be punishing him for the crime of having an opinion. The attorney general said his writings were so obscure that they could not have been made as a call to suicide; if they had been used as such it was unintentional. During the second trial, filmmaker Yves Boisset, director of a documentary on the case that contested the official narrative, Les Mystères sanglants de l'OTS, testified questioning the mass suicide theory.

The appeals court upheld the lower court's ruling, and he was acquitted a second time in December 2006. The judgment stated that there was no proof that he had knowingly participated in the organization of the deaths.

== Aftermath ==
The OTS suicides had shocked the French public, and due to the failure of the justice system to convict the only person who ever went on trial in that case, there was no "satisfying" conclusion, deeply frustrating the French authorities. Following the first failure to convict Tabachnik, the verdict was described as disappointing by French media outlets and anti-cult groups. The verdict was also criticized during parliamentary debates by several French deputies and senators, along with the acquittal of several Scientologists on fraud charges in France in 1996. Several politicians argued in the aftermath that such victims could not litigate their claims, due to the fact they were "gagged" by the cults, and that the judiciary was infiltrated by cults and prevented because judges assigned to the cases did not believe in the concept of mental manipulation.

Religious historian Jean-François Mayer, who had been appointed as an expert into the case, said following the first 2001 trial that:

[Tabachnik's] was meant to be an exemplary court case, with valeur pédagogique. How is it possible to have so many people dead and no one left alive to blame? In Tabachnik's trial at Grenoble they were trying to argue that what he wrote might influence other people to commit suicide. But there was nothing there in the literature to incriminate him. Abgrall was the great luminary of sectes and manipulation mentale—but there happened to be a judge who was not willing to accept far-fetched theories. The relatives of the victims have since appealed and want Tabachnik to be retried, so he now is left in limbo. Thus, the OTS was an extremely frustrating case with no closure, no one to blame.

As a result of the trial, Tabachnik had lost most of his work as a conductor and had to pause his career. Following his acquittal, Tabachnik returned to being a conductor. Following his acquittal, Tabachnik stated in a press release that: "My innocence has finally been recognized. I am emerging from eleven years of nightmare", and declared the whole series of trials "eleven years of slander, humiliation and dishonor". Tabachnik later sued Bouleau, unsuccessfully, for defamation. Tabachnik continues to deny any involvement in the planning of the deaths. Speaking on his involvement with the OTS and the trials, Tabachnik appeared in two 2022 documentary series on the case, Temple Solaire: l'enquête impossible and La Fraternité. It took two years to convince Tabachnik to be interviewed for La Fraternité; director Pierre Morath described him as "traumatized" by the whole affair and that it was "almost a miracle" he had agreed, with a fear that people would distort his words as had happened before.

Temple Solaire: l'enquête impossible also featured Bouleau and Bédat, both who had accused of him of being involved in the massacre. His appearance in the documentary took many weeks of convincing by the production team. Bédat described their meeting, saying that Tabachnik had "agreed to an interview and yelled at [him] for two hours", and that they had afterwards become friends. During an interview for the promotion of the series, Bédat stated he had changed his mind and no longer believed that Tabachnik had planned the deaths, and that him being away in concert had perhaps stopped him from being killed as well.

Sociologist Susan J. Palmer argued that the failure of the French justice system to convict Tabachnik resulted in the trial of the leader of the separate Néo-Phare group, who was convicted under the About–Picard law. Religious historian Jean-François Mayer described the case as telling "something about the dramatic consequences that such cases can lead to – and not only when they relate to religious movements", especially that it had taken 11 years to clear his name. He said that "undoubtedly the peculiar nature of the case added to the problems Tabachnik experienced". He further viewed the case as indicating that "one can confidently state that the main conclusions of the Swiss and French investigations match reality, insofar as we base our analysis on available evidence", but that this could not convince the relatives of the OTS members, who "are left with sad memories of the tragic fate of their loved ones and feelings of helplessness that justice has not been done."
