= L'Ordre du Temple solaire: Les Secrets d'une manipulation =

2000 book

- Cover of the first edition
- Author: Arnaud Bédat; Gilles Bouleau; Bernard Nicolas
- Language: French
- Subject: Order of the Solar Temple
- Publisher: Flammarion
- Publication date: 2000
- Publication place: France
- Pages: 451
- ISBN: 2-08-067842-6
- OCLC: 43653572

L'Ordre du Temple solaire: Les Secrets d'une manipulation is a 2000 book by investigative journalists Arnaud Bédat, Gilles Bouleau and Bernard Nicolas, covering the cult the Order of the Solar Temple, notorious for the mass murder-suicides committed by the group in the 1990s. It was published by Flammarion. It is the second book by the three authors on the topic, following 1996's Les Chevaliers de la mort. It shares some material with that book, but contains new material on the third suicide and a greater focus on hypotheses and the investigation itself, which encountered numerous problems.

The book resulted in a legal controversy during the trial of Michel Tabachnik over his involvement in the OTS; for the work, the authors interviewed several people close to the case, including examining magistrate Luc Fontaine, who had brought Tabachnik to trial. This resulted in Francis Szpiner attempting to get Fontaine removed from the case over violating case confidentiality. The book received largely positive reviews, noted for raising many questions about the case, but was generally viewed as not having answers for them, or many new revelations.

== Background ==
The Order of the Solar Temple was an organization known for several high profile mass suicides in the 1990s, led by Luc Jouret and Joseph Di Mambro. An initial 1994 mass suicide in Canada and Switzerland left 53 people dead, followed by another suicide in the Vercors in France the next year, killing 16. A third mass suicide in Quebec killed five more in 1997; 74 died in all. The case was widely publicized and was one of the biggest news stories in France. Afterwards, there emerged various theories involving a conspiratorial background to the events, with many viewing the case as having never been truly solved. The book's three authors were all investigative journalists: Arnaud Bédat worked for the Swiss magazine L'Illustré, while Gilles Bouleau led the TV magazine 19:00 Dimanche on TF1, with Bernard Nicolas deputy editor-in-chief at TF1. The same three authors had previously published in 1996 Les Chevaliers de la mort on the case.

In writing the book, they interviewed several people involved with the case, including a police officer who had attended to the scene of the 1997 suicide, ex-members, and Grenoble examining magistrate into the Vercors deaths Luc Fontaine.

== Contents ==
The book gives a rundown on the background of both founders, and the rise of the OTS through its precursor organization the Golden Way Foundation. It then proceeds onto the life of the order, the "cosmic child" Emmanuelle, the group's sexual abuses, and the group's problems leading up to the decision to commit mass suicide. The book shares large amounts of content with Les Chevaliers de la mort but covers more content on the investigation, Tabachnik and preceding events and covers others that the first book covered at length only shortly. It contains chapters the first book did not on the third mass suicide in Quebec, and more discussion on the investigation with particular attention on the examining magistrate Luc Fontaine.

The authors, while arguing that it is a cult, explore a variety of theories for possible ties, including involvement in money laundering, ties to far-right groups, trafficking of weapons and drugs, and other esoteric groups. They present a possible political force behind the OTS, which was what some of its members believed was the case. As to the rationale behind the suicides, a proposed reason was that the forces behind Jouret and Di Mambro growing frustrated with their visibility, precipitated by Jouret being pushed out of Martinique and the 1993 gun scandal. Fontaine was interviewed for the book. In it, he comments on the legal proceedings, and says that he had brought Tabachnik to trial to try to satisfy the families of the victims, despite the reluctance of the Public Prosecutor's Office. He also argues that the traditional theory, that the members had accepted killing themselves and were not killed by outside forces, was the most likely. However, the victims families had refused to accept this, so he thought a trial was needed. He suspected an instigator of the massacres.

They considered other theories, particularly involving the involvement of Michel Tabachnik or other occultists (Jacques Breyer and Raymond Bernard) and debates whether they had played a greater influence. The authors point out other strange aspects of the case, including inconsistencies in the autopsy versus the official conclusion (e.g. one of the perpetrators of the Vercors massacre was left-handed when the bullets were fired by a right-handed person), issues the investigation ran into (with the lead investigator asking the victims' relatives to withdraw complaints) and the ties of the lawyer of the Vuarnet family to a Masonic organization which Jouret and Di Mambro had also been involved in.

== Publication ==
L'Ordre du Temple solaire: Les Secrets d'une manipulation was published in 2000 by Flammarion in Paris. It is 451 pages long. The authors visited Quebec to promote the book. At the time of the book's publication, Swiss conductor and member of the OTS Michel Tabachnik was on trial due to his involvement in the case, which was initiated by Fontaine in 1996. As a result of Fontaine being interviewed by the authors of the book, Tabachnik's lawyer Francis Szpiner requested Fontaine be removed from the case on 28 February 2000. They claimed his statements were a violation of legal secrecy and due to his statements that he had only brought him to trial to satisfy the families. This was rejected by judge Barillon.

Separately, another complaint was filed, from a man mentioned in the book who had falsely accused a Genevan economist of being a member of the OTS; he described the work as "scandalous and mendacious". Bédat said of writing this second work that "We may never know everything, but we have come a long way towards the truth." Tabachnik was eventually found not guilty on all counts in 2001, after the book's publication. The three authors' investigation into the affair was covered in the 2022 documentary series Temple Solaire: l'enquête impossible.

== Reception ==
Swiss newspaper Le Temps noted L'Ordre du Temple solaire: Les Secrets d'une manipulation as presenting "only hypotheses" on what had happened, without definitively saying much. Le Matin said that it, alongside Tabachnik's own book Il était une fois un enfant, "between reality and fiction, two books attempt to shed some light on these tragic events, unfortunately still in a sickening nebula", and said that it amounted to "starting the investigation from scratch." They noted Fontaine's testimony as serving as the book's "guiding thread". Louis-Bernard Robitaill of La Presse, praised it convincingly showing negligence into the case, as having the "merit of providing an overall picture of this collective delirium, of showing little-known behind-the-scenes and of indicating gray areas that police or judicial officials have not tried too hard to dispel", though said it largely focused on the French part of the case.

The Canadian newspaper Le Soleil noted the book as clearly raising questions about the case and why the suicides had happened. They said of the work that though the authors "believed they have the truth after five years of investigation", they did not, and that what they instead had done was invoke a variety of leads including "major global esoteric networks to mafia-like criminal organizations active in money laundering and drug and arms trafficking", but that none of the leads were certain. Robitaill called it the first major investigation into the OTS, viewed the book as indicating the case had been "strangely botched", but noted the book had no "earth-shattering revelations" on the OTS case; he argued it showed that beneath all the theories there was "ultimately only a cult", though there may have been ties to politics that the investigators did not want to uncover.
