= Temple Solaire: l'enquête impossible =

French docuseries

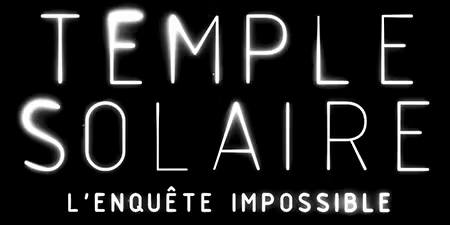
- French series logo
- Genre: Documentary miniseries
- Written by: Raphaël Rouyer
- Directed by: Nicolas Brénéol; Raphaël Rouyer
- Starring: Gilles Bouleau; Arnaud Bédat; Bernard Nicolas; Michel Tabachnik
- Original language: French
- No. of episodes: 4

Production
- Producer: Élodie Polo Ackermann
- Running time: 42 minutes
- Production companies: Imagissime; Attraction Images

Original release
- Network: TMC
- Release: 17 June – 20 June 2022

Temple Solaire: l'enquête impossible (lit. 'Solar Temple: The Impossible Investigation'), released in English as Sirius: An Apocalyptic Order, is a 2022 French documentary miniseries, covering the Order of the Solar Temple affair. It was directed by Raphaël Rouyer and Nicolas Brénéol. The Solar Temple was a religious group that committed mass murder-suicide in several incidents in the 1990s, killing 74 people in France, Switzerland and Canada. It focuses in particular on the three journalists Gilles Bouleau, Arnaud Bédat and Bernard Nicolas, who investigated the case.

It interviews several former members of the group, including Michel Tabachnik, the only person to go on trial in the case, and the families of the victims. The documentary also contains archival footage and materials from the group. The series first aired on TMC in June 2022, and received largely positive reviews. It was released in English on BBC Four in 2024.

== Background ==
The Order of the Solar Temple was a French religious group, notorious for the mass deaths of its members in the 90s. The group was led by Luc Jouret and Joseph Di Mambro. 74 people died in total in five massacres from 1994 to 1997 in France, Switzerland and Canada, some by murder and some by suicide. Many of the circumstances surrounding the case were mysterious, with some believing the massacres had been "ordered" by outside forces. The case was a media frenzy.

Journalists Gilles Bouleau, Arnaud Bédat, and Bernard Nicolas all investigated the case. They became friends after meeting during the investigation. They formed a partnership in investigating the OTS, and wrote two books on the case together. Bedat was a journalist for the Swiss magazine L'Illustré, while Nicolas and Bouleau worked for the French channel TF1. Their investigation impacted the legal process of the case, with Bédat uncovering documents that implicated Michel Tabachnik.

Tabachnik, a composer and former OTS member, was interviewed for the documentary. Suspected of being a leader of the group and playing a role in the deaths, he had been charged for his role in the deaths, but was acquitted twice. Tabachnik had previously sued Bouleau, unsuccessfully, for defamation for implicating him in the investigation. The documentary also interviews other former members of the group, and archival footage and materials from the group.

== Interviewees ==
- Gilles Bouleau, investigating journalist
- Arnaud Bédat, investigating journalist
- Bernard Nicolas, investigating journalist
- Michel Tabachnik, former member of the OTS
- Évelyne Brunner, former member
- Yannick Jaulin, former member
- Michel Friedli, former member
- Sylvain Ostiguy, former member

== Episodes ==
No.	Title	Original release date
1	"Massacres ou suicides ? (transl. Massacre or Suicide)"	17 June 2022
2	"Les origines (transl. The Origins)"	17 June 2022
3	"Soupçons (transl. Suspicions)"	20 June 2022
4	"Verdict"	20 June 2022

== Production and release ==
The producer said that in making the series they had wanted to use the visual language of a science fiction series (drawing a comparison to Stranger Things) to appeal to younger generations who had not followed the case. It is from the same producer, Élodie Polo Ackermann, as Who Killed Little Gregory?. The series was directed by Raphaël Rouyer and Nicolas Brénéol. Its production took a year, under the production companies Imagissime and Attraction Images. A large portion of the archival material, particularly press-related ones, were sourced from Bédat, who had collected many OTS-related materials.

In an interview during the promotion of the series, Brénéol stated that "no one is safe from finding themselves caught up in a cult", and that while making the documentary, he had realized "how easy it is to make someone lose their free will". Bouleau said during an interview that while investigating, the three of them had wondered whether they could have fallen for what the members of the OTS had, and said that "to answer "no" would be to lie to ourselves". Bouleau said in an interview that what had drawn him to the case was understanding how "in countries as standardized and controlled as Quebec, France and Switzerland, this counter culture that was the OTS had been able to develop with complete impunity"; Bédat said it was the contrast between the characters of Di Mambro and Jouret.

Rouyer stated that the purpose in making the documentary was not to redo the investigation, but to tell what he called a fascinating story from a nuanced perspective; he said this was why Tabachnik agreed to be interviewed. In interviewing Tabachnik, he said that they aimed to be neutral and non-partisan in presenting his character, with everyone free to form their own opinions. They were free to make whatever choices with the documentary they wanted and he had no say in the editing process. Tabachnik's appearance in the documentary took many weeks of convincing by the production team. Several other former members also had to be convinced, with pre-interviews being conducted by phone and writing ahead of time to better explain and understand their stories. Several survivors of the group continued to express their approval of it, even when interviewed.

As Bouleau and Tabachnik had been the one to implicate him in the investigation, Tabachnik considered them to have ruined his life. Bédat described his initial meeting with Tabachnik, saying that Tabachnik had "agreed to an interview and yelled at [him] for two hours", and that they had afterwards become friends. During an interview for the promotion of the series, Bédat stated he had changed his mind and no longer believed that Tabachnik had planned the deaths, and that him being away in concert had perhaps stopped him from being killed as well. He also stated he was surprised that the creators of the series had asked for his involvement.

The series first aired on TMC in France on 17 June 2022. Over the next year, two other documentary series released on the case, La Fraternité and La Secte. An English version, Sirius: An Apocalyptic Order, aired in December 2024 on BBC Four, and was simultaneously released on iPlayer.

== Reception ==
Le Figaro positively reviewed the series, calling it "fascinating" and comparing it to a detective story. They noted the editing as "dense", praising the series's access to archival material and its interviews with many ex-members. They did note that the series raised the question of the "interest in stirring up such a quagmire of misery and solitude". Télé-Loisirs praised Bouleau's "encyclopedic knowledge" of the OTS as expressed in the documentary, describing it as better than the actual investigators and judges who presided over the case. Le Matin called the documentary "captivating" and said it was "surprisingly moving". Le Point praised the series for giving a voice to the relatives of the victims of the group and former members.

The Guardian's Hannah J. Davies gave the show 3 out of 5 stars. She praised its graphics, soundtrack, and noted it as showcasing "an almost overwhelming amount of information on the media frenzy that exploded around the OTS in the French-speaking world". She criticized the documentary as often times hard to follow, in part due to it jumping between events, and said it "buried the lede" in some of its content. Davies overall said that for those who were interested in cults it could be a good choice, but for others "it may feel too much like seeing how the true-crime sausage is made".
