= 1997 Saint-Casimir mass suicide =

Religious mass suicide

- Date: 20–22 March 1997
- Location: Saint-Casimir, Quebec, Canada; 46.6363°N 72.1570°W
- Type: Mass suicide
- Motive: Theological concept of "transit" to Sirius
- Perpetrator: Members of the Order of the Solar Temple
- Outcome: Five dead, three survivors, the disintegration of the remainder of the OTS
- Deaths: 5
- Coroner: Yvon Naud

On 22 March 1997, five members of the Order of the Solar Temple (OTS) committed mass suicide in Saint-Casimir, Quebec, setting their house on fire with them inside. Among the dead were two couples: Didier and Chantal Quèze and Bruno Klaus and Pauline Riou, as well as Chantal's mother Suzanne Druau. The three children of the Quèzes had initially been included in the suicide plan, but the first attempt to initiate the suicide failed. After the failure of the first attempt, they confronted their parents, and convinced them that they wanted to live and were let go. Following two more unsuccessful attempts to orchestrate the suicide, the final attempt, with help from the children, was successful.

This followed two prior mass suicides by the group in 1994 and 1995; the group had the theological doctrine that by committing suicide, one would not die, but "transit"; they conceptualized the transit as a ritual involving magic fire, where they would undergo a spiritual voyage to the star Sirius, where they would continue their lives. The two leaders of the group, Joseph Di Mambro and Luc Jouret, had both died in the 1994 incident, but a second mass suicide was orchestrated the next year by the remaining members. Following these past suicides, the group was believed dissolved and was officially banned in Quebec, but it was suspected that they may have continued to operate secretly.

On 20 March, the Quèzes, as well as Klaus and Riou, all former members of the OTS group, began attempting to orchestrate the suicides; they mailed a suicide letter to two Canadian media outlets, outlining their reasons for committing the act. They then drugged their children and attempted to burn the house down. The attempts repeatedly failed, due to both mechanical error and the intervention of the couple's children. Following three unsuccessful attempts to orchestrate the suicide, two days later the children finally helped their parents burn the house down.

Four died of smoke inhalation, while a fifth was separately suffocated by another. While the children were directly involved, they were ultimately not charged with any crime, as the Ministry of Justice deemed their responsibility lessened by their ingestion of drugs and their influence by the sect. After the incident, the OTS is widely believed to have effectively dissolved. The incident provoked widespread media interest and commentary in Quebec, particularly on religious freedom.

== Background ==
The Order of the Solar Temple was a religious group active in several French-speaking countries, led by Joseph Di Mambro and Luc Jouret. Founded in 1984, it was a neo-Templar secret society with eclectic beliefs sourced from many different movements like Rosicrucianism, Theosophy, and the New Age. The OTS had a commune in Sainte-Anne-de-la-Pérade in Quebec, the "Sacred Heart" (French: Sacré-Coeur) commune and farm. The location, having previously belonged to the Catholic organization the Brothers of the Sacred Heart, was bought by the OTS in 1984 for 235,000 Canadian dollars. The farm was located on the north shore of the St. Lawrence River near Quebec City, where the group was headquartered in an old orphanage, also home to one of Jouret's Club Amenta locations. It was intended as an "ark of survival" far from urban areas with 100 people to repopulate the Earth following an apocalypse, due to the beginning of the Age of Aquarius, which would destroy Europe. By 1988, there were about 50 people living at this commune, who worked as volunteer farm workers. Members practiced organic farming and worked long and difficult hours; they also occasionally organized conferences on OTS ideas.

The OTS seemed to be doing well, but on 25 November, the 1988 Saguenay earthquake occurred at a 5.3 magnitude; this earthquake damaged the view held by Jouret and other Templars that Quebec would be a safe haven from the impending apocalypse, which was the main reason they had moved to Canada. While Jouret often spoke of the apocalypse, he had predicted that Quebec would be spared; following the earthquake, members of the Sacred Heart commune began to criticize his leadership and his predictions (viewing them as too specific). The farm was also not self-sustaining, and the commune was close to bankruptcy. In March 1993, Jouret and several other members became embroiled in a gun scandal, when they were charged for attempting to buy illegal weapons, violating Québec law. Following the gun scandal, member Didier Quèze told the media that they were harmless and not a cult; he stated, "In a cult, you're told what to do. Here, you do what you think you should do."

=== Earlier deaths ===
Following the gun scandal, Jouret became very paranoid and concerned with purported injustice. He began speaking of "transit", an idea which had previously been introduced by Di Mambro several years earlier; the idea of a "voluntary departure of templars to another dimension in space in order to recreate the world." They conceptualized the transit as a ritual involving magic fire, where they would undergo a spiritual voyage to the star Sirius. In October 1994, the first incident killed 53 people, 48 in Switzerland and five in Canada; several of the dead did not consent to death or were directly murdered for being "traitors". Among the dead were both Di Mambro and Jouret. The group left a suicide letter called "The Testament". The main message of this letter is a call to other members of the OTS to join the departed ones by "transiting" themselves, encouraging former members to kill themselves. Included in this letter were the words:

Know that from wherever we are, we will always reach out to those who are worthy of joining us.

Following these suicides, the group became internationally notorious. In December 1995, 16 more members of the OTS would commit mass suicide, this time in France. Following the previous suicides, French police rounded up members of the OTS for preventative reasons, fearing new mass suicides on dates tied to astrological events or Templar history. It was stated by Yves Casgrain, a spokesman for Info-Secte, that the group likely still operated in Quebec, only underground. The OTS was officially banned by the government of Quebec after the first mass suicide and was believed to be dissolved.

=== The remaining members ===
The Quèzes, Didier and Chantal Quèze (née Goupillot), 39 and 41 years old, respectively, managed the bakery at the Sacred Heart commune: living apart from other members, they were not well-liked, with former OTS members describing Didier as the "know-it-all" of the farm on the commune and as "a real character", while his wife was described as passive and unassertive. The couple was perceived by one ex-member as "withdrawn, haughty, and ill-tempered". Former teachers from France, they had moved to Switzerland to be in closer proximity to the group, before moving to Canada. They had three teenaged children, aged 13 to 16. Sixty-three-year-old Suzanne Druau, Chantal's mother, was not a member of the OTS, but was associated with the movement and lived in a way permissible to the group's beliefs; she had moved from France to live with her daughter following the death of her husband. Druau was the only person to have died in the entire series of OTS deaths who was not a member of the group.

Forty-nine-year-old Bruno Klaus was the former head farmer of the commune; following his divorce from Rose-Marie, he was with Pauline Riou. Klaus was described as a calm and hardworking man, known to be fanatical about the farming methods on the commune (involving astrology), though his methods were ineffective and he was later made to work at the bakery. A lapsed Catholic from Switzerland, Klaus had met Luc Jouret in Switzerland circa 1984 when he visited him (as Jouret was a doctor) due to an earache. Jouret told him that he had actually had cancer, but that he had cured it – after this, Jouret would often tell Klaus that he "should be dead" and that he owed him his life. Klaus would then become a devoted follower of Jouret. Marie-Louise Rebaudo, the OTS's astrologer, later claimed that she saw significant changes in his star chart, which showed that he was to move to Quebec to help start the "ark of survival". He moved with Rose-Marie to the Sacred Heart commune. He had invested over 100,000 Canadian dollars into the farm purchase.

Rose-Marie eventually left the OTS over a "cosmic marriage" enforced by the group that separated her from her husband. For several years after this, she repeatedly tried to get Bruno back, having a "foot inside, but always one outside" the OTS community, but eventually gave up, and began contacting anti-cult groups. She divorced him and returned to Switzerland, taking their two children with her; while previously Bruno Klaus had been a high-status member, his reputation in the group suffered due to the actions of his wife. According to Swiss journalist Arnaud Bédat, Klaus was later romantically involved with Jocelyne Friedli, who died in the 1995 incident. He was then partners with Pauline Riou. Pauline Riou was a 54-year-old Canadian nurse; speaking of her, former member Hermann Delorme described Riou as completely "enthralled" with Jouret, saying that she would "tremble when he spoke". She was not a very active member of the group but was described as a very faithful and obedient one. Klaus, Riou, and the Quèzes were all close friends.

Following the investigation of former members in the group in Canada, Klaus and Didier Quèze, among nearly 100 other former members or sympathizers, were met by police; many of these members were extremely disappointed in the fact that they had not been selected as part of the previous mass suicide. The Quèzes moved to Saint-Casimir, a town of 2,000 people near Quebec City, following the deaths, where they established a bakery, but continued to practice OTS ritual and ideology in secret; they moved their bakery, where they continued to work. Their neighbors were unaware of their connection to the group, then notorious, viewing them as "quite normal", though private. The couple's three children were forbidden from joining sports teams by their parents, and according to their classmates could not play with their peers or leave the house.

=== Planning and warnings ===
Following the 1994 deaths, Klaus and Didier Quèze were distraught, viewing themselves as having been abandoned by Jouret; according to Bédat they felt rejected by society and were convinced they were being spied on. Didier Quèze was placed under police watch by the Sûreté du Québec (SQ) in July 1996, but nothing beyond that, and he defended himself to the press. It was known that the four of them still had extreme faith in OTS beliefs. Police had last had contact with them the last summer solstice. A former police investigator into the OTS claimed that the police had visited the Quèzes several months prior to the deaths and that during this visit he had begged them not to take the children with them if they did do another transit, and that in response they had "[sung him] sweet nothings". Hermann Delorme predicted that another suicide would take place on the summer solstice of 1996, though this did not occur.

According to Journal de Québec, in the weeks prior the police and Bédat had received several clues that indicated the planning of a third massacre in Quebec. According to Bédat, it was known that there were "still a few fanatics left"; he said he had received what he described as "very specific information" that something would happen near Quebec City. Following the publication of his book on the OTS in Canada in March 1997, L'Ordre du Temple Solaire, he spoke publicly to the media warning about how he believed a third massacre by the group was a possibility. He stated: "We really can't rule out that they are preparing a third massacre. The fact that the first and second have left legitimizes their faith, suggests that there is indeed an afterlife as they imagined. How far will these convinced followers go? The worst is still possible..." Klaus was once quoted in this book on the subject of his romantic relationships, telling how he and Friedli had switched wives at Jouret's suggestion. Bédat had previously had telephone contact with Klaus and Didier Quèze, and described them as being "agitators" of the OTS, "if not leaders".

In April 1996, Bédat published an article in the Swiss magazine L'Illustré titled Un troisième massacre se prépare au Québec, 'A third massacre is being prepared in Quebec'. A few days before the killings, Bédat sent a fax warning a former member who lived in Canada to be careful, especially of members Klaus and Didier Quèze. Following the mass suicide, the book, and Bédat's statements discussing the possibility of another massacre, were discussed by several news outlets. According to Delorme, in the weeks leading up to the "transit", Klaus and Didier Quèze often spoke of "travelling". Clément Godin, owner of the only gas station in the area, said that he had seen Didier Quèze fill up his gas cans, and that he seemed well. Godin was also the chief firefighter of the town and would later be one of the first responders.

In a private letter to his relatives left behind, one of the members wrote:

all the people in the Order were extraordinary, very far from the image of bastards spread by the newspapers. If only you could know how kind Luc Jouret was. We have all been hunted down like dogs because what we are telling, what we are relating, disturbs at a high level. [...] we are relieved to know that we as well as our children will no more have to endure the craziness of this earthly world. Don't believe anything that you will read about us. If only there would have been honest journalists, we would have helped them to write their articles.

The letter defends their choice to die, and asks for forgiveness for the people they may have hurt, but says that they are happy to have accomplished their work, that it was merely moving again, but this time further away.

== Mass suicide ==
=== 20 March ===
On 20 March 1997, the Quèzes arrived home, after going on a two-day trip the destination of which is unknown. The same day, the pair mailed the Canadian newspapers La Presse and Le Journal de Montréal a "testament" letter, from a post office in Sainte-Anne-de-la-Pérade; it was stamped on the 21st. This letter was not taken seriously by the organizations they mailed and it was not published. A copy of this was also left in the shed. One excerpt from this letter read:

We must however specify that it was necessary that a group of Men, Women and Children, having been previously prepared, had to go through the vicissitudes of these 3 years in Law and Service; so that the experience acquired could fully bear its fruits, to enrich the Consciousness of the Return to the Father.

Religious scholar Alain Bouchard summed up the letter as saying "we have had enough, you do not want to understand anything, we prefer to die". The "testament" letter argued that the three mass suicides together constituted one singular transit, calling the first one an "exceptional moment" and saying the second had reactivated the process of planning another mass suicide. It blames the media, saying that the members "know full well that the media's filth against us will increase", though unlike previous letters it is mostly focused on living OTS members, to whom it says that the letter was intended to bring clarity.

It threatens Thierry Huguenin, the 54th intended member of the 1994 suicide who had escaped, that "[a]s for the pseudo 54th, he should know that the welcoming committee is waiting for him." La Presse described it as reminiscent of the 1994 transit letters written by Di Mambro. According to Shannon Clusel and Susan J. Palmer, they rationalized the fact that they had not been selected to participate in the earlier "transits" by Jouret and Di Mambro as a kind of "trial period" that had been done to strengthen them.

Later in that evening, the Quèzes drugged their children, who did not know of the plans, with juice laced with sedatives. The children then went to sleep. The adults had created a setup involving propane tanks, gas canisters, and stoves, designed to explode the house; three five-gallon canisters of gasoline were attached to three propane tanks and a timer. This was planned for the spring equinox.

=== 21 March ===
Early in the morning, one of the teens woke up, and finding the unconscious body of her father, found the setup designed to set the house on fire. She then woke up her two siblings, and they then tried and failed to wake up their mother, but succeeded in waking up Druau. Druau told them that the group had "failed" (but did not tell them that they had been trying to kill themselves). The siblings then succeeded at thwarting the attempt by airing the house out, closing the propane tanks, and removing the rest of the setup – this was all done while their parents were still asleep.

When the adults eventually woke up, they were confronted by the children. Chantal Quèze initially told the children that they would not attempt suicide again before Didier Quèze said they would – but this time their children would have a choice in whether they wanted to be included or not. The daughter almost agreed to participate in the suicide, before one of her brothers convinced her not to. That day, their school was worried about them given their absence; they had never been absent before. The principal called the home, which was answered by the older son, who told him that his siblings were sick and he had to take care of them.

Following this, the children spent the remaining hours of the day tending to the adults, who were sick after the suicide attempt. As of the evening, the teenagers were still not decided as to whether they would participate; their parents, however, apparently believed they had agreed to die with them, and proceeded to slip sedatives into their food a second time. The children, assuming that the adults were too sick to try to do it again, slept, but close to midnight they were woken up again by their mother's cries and were too affected by the drugs to do anything. During the night, Druau was suffocated by the Quézes with a plastic bag (which had also occurred in the other OTS suicides), with her consent.

=== 22 March ===
Didier Quéze then repeated his attempt to restart the ignition machinery. Early in the morning, the teenagers woke up again and went downstairs, finding their father trying to reassemble the ignition system, and Druau dead with a garbage bag over her head. The children, having decided that they did not want to die, then proceeded to, again, remove the suicide setup, airing the house out and removing the system; the other adults were mostly asleep at this time. The children proceeded to argue with the adults through the morning, begging them not to die. Didier Quèze told them that their grandmother's death made it so they could no longer turn back, and once again the children's parents asked them if they would die with them. With some hesitation, all of the children refused. Later in the day, their parents gave them permission to survive as long as they did not interfere with their own deaths. The teens were then drugged and sent to a shed in the garden (where they had placed a bed), but after several hours the fire had failed to start and they returned to the house.

Upon returning, the teenagers found the adults very ill, and once again stopped the ignition system, before begging their parents to not die. Their mother asked the children to restart the ignition system before they helped Klaus and Riou upstairs. They then helped their father start the fire, starting the ignition timer again, which also failed. A final time, they returned to the house (where they brought their mother additional sedative drugs at her request) and started the timer. They returned to the shed, taking with them several personal items and "some mementos of their parents". By about half an hour later, at 6 p.m., the house was burning. After a call from a neighbor, firefighters soon arrived, and after the fires diminished an hour later they were able to enter the home. At 7:35 p.m., they discovered four of the burnt bodies in the master bedroom on the second floor, arranged in a crucifix formation.

Red rose petals were scattered throughout the room, and while searching the house police found a sword with Pauline Riou's name engraved into the handle and medieval-style clothing. Once the smoke cleared, Druau's body was found on the first floor at 8:05. The three propane tanks were found detached from the detonation mechanism and were unaltered by the fire. In the debris, metal grills were discovered containing cloth drenched in flammable substances. The timers used in the detonation mechanism resembled those used for the fire set at Morin-Heights. An hour after officers arrived, the three teenagers came out of the shed in the garden, and were found by the chief fire officer who believed them to be possibly drugged. The teenagers were taken to be medically examined and were found to have traces of benzodiazepines in their blood.

Coincidentally, on the night of the 22nd, the Quebec television channel Canal D aired a documentary on the Order of the Solar Temple, Aller simple pour Sirius, 'One-way ticket to Sirius'. This documentary contains testimonials from people who had lost their parents to past OTS suicides.

== Aftermath ==
Following the suicides, there was widespread media interest, particularly about the extent of the children's involvement and what had led to the events, with many competing theories; a heated debate on religious freedom in Quebec resulted. As the event had happened over the weekend, there was little coverage the following day, except for the broadcast of a Sûreté du Québec press conference and a brief interview with sociologist Raymond Lemieux; however, come Monday there began intense media coverage. Early coverage included interviews with former member Hermann Delorme and novelist Guy Fournier, who had written a novel based on the OTS; Fournier called the event a "human tragedy", a demonstration of "remarkable faith" by people who were "screwed", while Delorme described those who died as having been "pushed to the wall", "no longer capable of living the situation". Later coverage was more critical, promoting intervention in religious matters. Anti-cult speaker Yves Casgrain accused the government of having "blood on its hands", and said they had not listened to his warnings. He declared the incident an example of how cults can manipulate their victims, even if the leaders had been dead for years. Mike Kropveld, director of Info-Secte, said the government should be doing more to fight cults. The population of the village expressed their shock at the incident.

In the immediate aftermath, Arnaud Bédat stated that a fourth massacre was still possible, though he said there were no reliable leads unlike in the Saint-Casimir case, only rumors. The OTS was fixated on numerology: Bédat noted that with the deaths of five additional members, the total death toll of the OTS had been brought to 74; seven and four add to 11, a significant number for the OTS as it was the number of "elder brothers" in their theology. The children dying would have made it 77, a double number, also important to the OTS. He noted that though it was still the same group, it was a smaller more isolated affair, a "question of Klaus and his new concubine, of Quèze, his wife and his mother-in-law." In addition to the vernal equinox, he speculated that the timing of the suicides could also have to do with the weekend having experienced a lunar eclipse and the passage of the Hale–Bopp comet. The Canadian newspaper Le Devoir later received a letter from other OTS members following the deaths, discussing the Saint-Casimir incident.

On the same day as the Saint-Casimir suicide, members of the unrelated Heaven's Gate group also began a mass suicide. Heaven's Gate happened to be a group with similar beliefs, in both cases believing that suicide would allow their souls to be transported into space. This led to initial suspicions of a connection, though police investigating the Heaven's Gate deaths refused to acknowledge these speculations. Scholars and journalists speculated immediately after the deaths that both groups had possibly been motivated in their timing in part by the vernal equinox (which had occurred on the 20th). The OTS deaths had been timed for the equinox, but due to the failed attempts they did not happen until the 22nd. Heaven's Gate had instead timed it for the closest approach of the Hale–Bopp comet on the 22nd. There was no apparent connection found between the two groups.

=== Investigation ===
The transit letter was immediately seized by the police following the suicides, in order to carry out analysis of it, especially to determine that it had not been written by anyone not among the dead. Excerpts of this letter were printed in a 25 March 1997 article by Martin Pelchat of La Presse, and included in Bédat's second book; the SQ refused to grant two researchers access to the letter in 2020. Handwriting analysis was done, as well as toxicology tests on the bodies of the dead and investigation related to the final phone calls made by the members killed. The teenagers were made to identify their parents' bodies by police, which they made the youngest son do. According to police, after learning of the death of their parents, only the eldest son cried.

The children were questioned by police; they said they did not remember what exactly had happened, likely due to the drugs. While awaiting the decision as to whether they would be charged, they were put in a Quebec City center operated by the Direction de la protection de la jeunesse (DPJ), the address of which was kept secret. Their schoolmates wrote them letters and recorded them a video cassette, though the DPJ did not want them to have outside contact during this period. They were later allowed to contact their classmates, but not allowed to discuss what had happened.

Based on their testimonies, the children were considered to have played an "active role" in the mass suicide by investigators. Possible criminal charges for this kind of action could have been arson or murder. The Sûreté du Québec gave the Chief Deputy Attorney General discretion as to whether they would be charged, with no expressed opinion in their submitted report, which was atypical compared to common practice. On 24 April, the Quebec Ministry of Justice stated they would not press criminal charges against the Quèze children, ruling that though they were responsible for the deaths, this responsibility was mitigated by the fact they had been drugged. They also noted the "culture of a cult that nurtures psychological destabilization annihilates the critical spirit and creates a break with generally accepted references", and that the children had experienced a "complete psychological drift".

The coroner investigating the case was Yvon Naud. In his report on the deaths, released 8 October 1997, his single recommendation was the establishment of a committee to study and understand cults, and how to recognize and stop ones that became dangerous. This recommendation was not followed. The four adults (besides Druau) were found to have died from asphyxiation due to smoke inhalation, before the fire reached their bodies. There were no signs of other violence or poisoning, though the dead were found to have consumed significant quantities of tranquilizing drugs.

== Legacy ==
This was the only OTS incident that left behind survivors (with the possible exception of Thierry Huguenin, who claimed to have escaped the first massacre); it was also the only one that was purely voluntary for those that died. Reflecting on the case, religious historian Jean-François Mayer called the fact there were witnesses left behind the most noticeable aspect of the case compared to the others, allowing the exact sequence of events to be known, which showed that it was done purely out of the conviction of the followers. He further called it extraordinary that a group of members had persevered through both the prior deaths, only to do the same thing; he said this showed the degree of conviction some of them had reached. After this third suicide, the total number of people dead in incidents related to the OTS stood at 74.

The three children returned to France to live with their grandparents about two months after the deaths. During the trial of composer Michel Tabachnik for his alleged responsibility in the OTS deaths in 2001, one of the teenagers testified about her experiences; she expressed how she had thought of dying with her parents, stating "My parents didn't want to stay alive. I still don't understand why, but I know there wasn't much we could do about it. Before he died, my father simply said to me: watch out for vultures." Interviewed 15 years after the suicide, one of the three teenagers to have survived stated he did not blame his parents. He expressed his desire to move on, stating: "It doesn't make any difference whether it's been 5 years, 10 years, 15 years. The page is turned, I've understood what happened, I don't blame my parents. Enough ink has been spilled on that now. That's it." Their former neighbor and guardian, who kept in contact with them, reported they were doing well.

The house where the suicides occurred was put up for sale by Didier Quèze's estate after the deaths. It was bought by a volunteer firefighter who had been the first person to arrive at the scene, then a neighbor who had seen the fire through the window. The house was renovated following the sale. He had known the three Quèze children well prior to the incident, as they were friends with his children. He was one of the only people in the village who knew of the Quèzes' connection to the OTS, though he believed they were no longer members. He became their guardian until they returned to France, as they had no family in Canada. In 2012, he stated that many people had offered to pay him for a visit to the house, which he refused, or asked if the house had ghosts. People also visited the house in the years after the deaths, but according to him this eventually ceased.

In 2012, religious scholar Alain Bouchard said there were few warning signs of the suicide – the only clear one being their continuous agreement with the Order's beliefs. The coroner who had investigated the case, Yvon Naud, argued that the event could not have been predicted. He stated: "Can we lock someone up just in case, because of their beliefs? These are people we can rub shoulders with every day, there isn't something in their face that says, 'I'm part of the Order of the Solar Temple and I have to fly to Sirius on a cosmic journey'." Bouchard noted that the letter they sent had not been taken seriously, which may have been the only tangible sign of their intentions. The lead Sûreté du Québec investigator into the OTS, Jacques St-Pierre, said he had known since the first mass suicide that another could occur in Canada, given many members were disappointed they had not been included in the initial mass suicide. Arnaud Bédat stated he had been given "very specific information" that something would happen near Quebec City.

It was the final suicide linked to the group. In 2000, the religious scholar Massimo Introvigne wrote that further suicides could not be excluded "as long as even one single person still shares the OTS's ideology". In 2012, Bouchard said that he believed that the group continues to exist and still has members, but the same year Bédat said it was the "last journey of the last fanatics, those who were frustrated at not having left with the others". Though many former members continued to have contact, he said they no longer adhered to OTS ideology and that there was no more danger. He believed there was no OTS left, and that the remaining members had "returned to real life".
