= Facon (surname) =

Facon is a French surname. Notable people with the surname include:

- Albert Facon (born 1943), French politician
- Roger Facon (born 1950), French writer
