= Roger Facon =

French writer (born 1950)

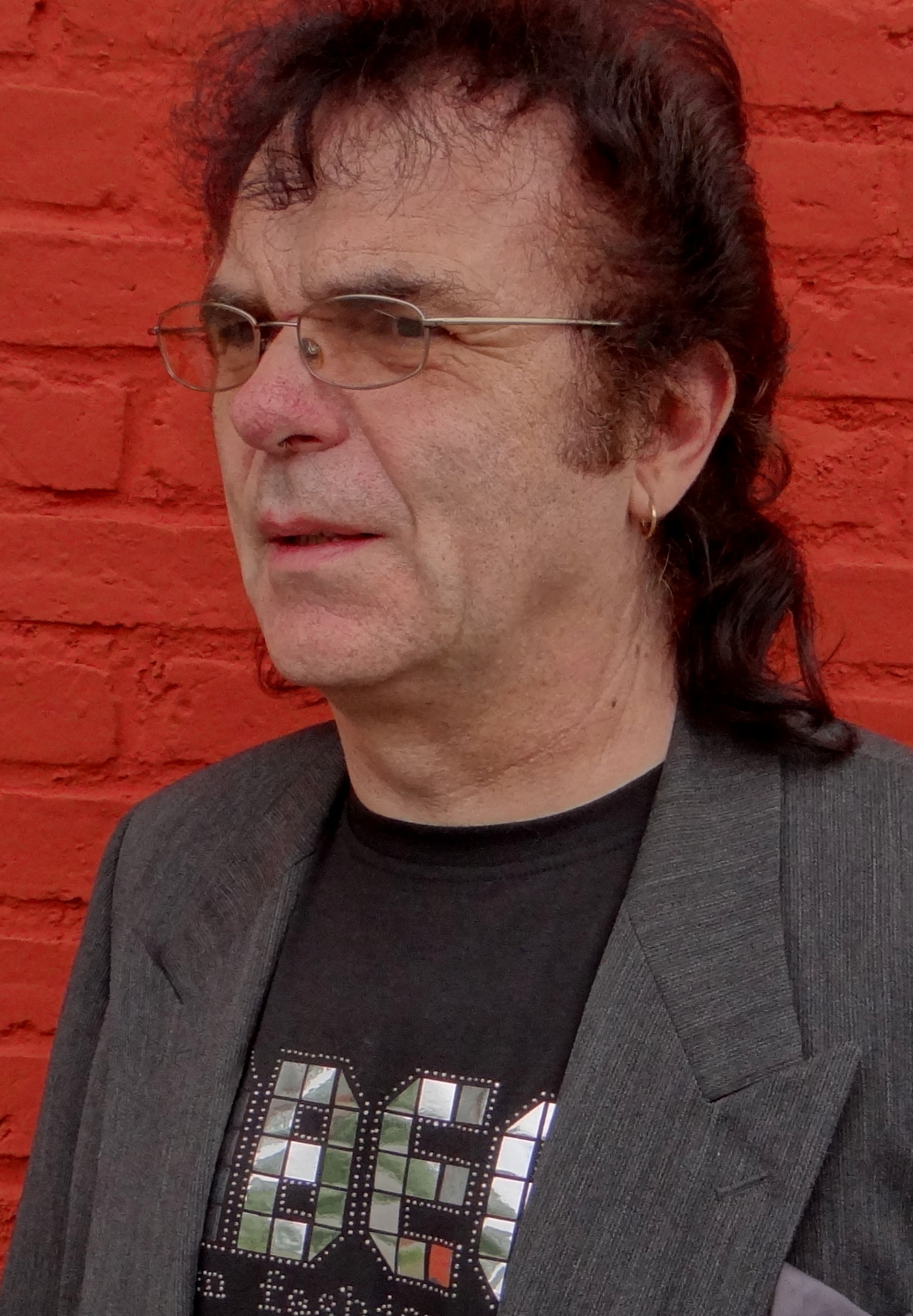
- Facon in 2012
- Born: 20 January 1950 (age 76); France
- Occupations: Novelist, writer, police officer
- Writing career
- Language: French
- Period: 1978–present
- Genres: Crime fiction, science fiction, fantasy literature
- Subjects: Secret societies, the occult

Roger Facon (born 20 January 1950) is a French former police officer and author of novels and nonfiction works. A police officer from 1973 until he retired in 2000, he wrote largely in the genres of crime fiction, fantasy literature, and science fiction. He wrote books for the Fleuve Noir Anticipation series and for Série Noire with his 1997 novel La Crypte. Elements of his stories were taken from his career as a police officer.

He also wrote several nonfiction books on occult and secret society topics and claimed to have infiltrated several secret societies. Several of his books were collaborations with Jean-Marie Parent. Facon's investigations into the secret society the Order of the Solar Temple, on which he published a book, played a role in the investigation of that case, though his works on it received a mixed reception. Facon was also the deputy mayor and later deputy minister for culture of the French commune of Aniche.

== Early life and career ==
Roger Facon was born on 20 January 1950 into a working-class family in France. As a teenager, Facon was a glassworker before taking an exam for teacher training college at the age of 16. He passed the exam but at 21 decided instead to pursue work as an educator in Valenciennes, Hauts-de-France. From there, Facon, influenced by friends of his father, decided in 1973 to become a police officer. He said his great uncle introduced him to Jean-Paul Sartre and Gustave Flaubert in his teenage years.

As a police officer, Facon was an inspector for the gendarmerie. He first worked in Wazemmes before moving on to Douai. His final station as an officer was in Aniche. He worked in crime prevention and also held writing workshops for the poor. He claimed he was held back from advancing due to his commitment to investigating certain topics. Facon retired from being a police officer in 2000.

== Writing career ==
As of 2009, he had written about 30 novels. His typical genre is crime fiction, though he has also written and began with writing science fiction. His first thriller novel was 1979's Mort au gourou. Throughout the 1980s, Facon mostly wrote nonfiction books on occultism topics and fantasy books, though many of his fiction books also portray occultist elements. He co-wrote with Jean-Marie Parent on some of his nonfiction and fiction books. For the series Fleuve Noir Anticipation, Facon wrote several heroic fantasy novels in the 1980s and 1990s, including Par le sabre des Zinjas and Les compagnons de la lune blême. He created the Biennale du polar (transl. Biennial of Crime Fiction).

Facon later returned to thrillers; he credited his inspiration to return to the genre to writers Didier Daeninckx and Frédéric H. Fajardie. He wrote for the Série Noire with his 1997 novel La Crypte. Reviewing La Crypte, a reviewer praised it as "lively and funny", and found it to be a fictionalized version of the Solar Temple case Facon had discussed, with discussions of secret societies and neo-Templar groups. He took elements for his books from his career as a police officer; one book was directly set at the station where he worked. This at times drew ire from his superiors in the force. In 2021, he returned to science fiction writing with a book about cities being destroyed by extraterrestrial forces.

=== Occultism ===
He wrote several historical non-fiction works on occultism, secret societies, and neo-Templar topics. Many were coauthored with Jean-Marie Parent. He also wrote books on the Rosicrucians. The interest in this began with Jean-Marie Parent, Facon's close friend and an officer during the Algerian War; Parent claimed that he had discovered many in French intelligence were interested in cults and esotericism, so he claims he decided to infiltrate them and became a high-ranking member. Occultism scholar Serge Caillet said both Facon and Parent were, themselves, neo-Templars and were at one point members of the Rosicrucian order AMORC for unclear reasons. Facon says they both infiltrated these groups in order to hunt down fascists, which was questioned by some in the groups.

The first book he wrote with Parent was Sectes et societes secretes aujourd'hui: le complot des ombres. Several occultism books of his criticized occultist groups, including the Renewed Order of the Temple (ORT) group; ORT criticized them back in an occult magazine. Caillet said in Parent and Facon's book Sectes et societes secretes aujourd'hui, they "spare no one except" a single neo-Templar group. In their 1981 book Les Meurtres de l'occulte, they continued their criticism of ORT and also criticized AMORC; AMORC sued them for this. Esotericist Raymond Bernard, legate of AMORC and a founder of ORT, who he criticized, said he respected Facon as a researcher but he was biased, and that he hoped Facon one day saw this.

=== Order of the Solar Temple ===
Later, Facon became known for his investigations into the secret society the Order of the Solar Temple (OTS), notorious for committing mass suicide, which was descended from ORT. He published a book in 1995 on the OTS, Vérité et révélations sur l'ordre du Temple solaire: Opération Faust, chronique d'un massacre annoncé. It collects several witness statements. The Solar Temple itself had plagiarized the first part of the fifteenth chapter of Facon's book Les Rose-Croix vont-ils en enfer? in its suicide message La Rose+Croix. Facon claimed to writer David Cohen that he had been contacted to write a book on the OTS ten months before the suicides in order to expose them but had not, as he had "better things to write". He claimed he had been approached again a few months before the suicides occurred and claimed he had attended a meeting with links to security services that had foreknowledge of the massacre ("Operation Faust") and sought to prevent it; he is skeptical it was a mass suicide because he saw little reason the leaders should want to. The 1995 book received a mixed reception.

Caillet criticized this book and disputed some of his claims about the OTS and the ORT and associated figures in this and other books; scholar Jean-François Mayer called it "bizarre (to say the least...)", especially in light of the Solar Temple having plagiarized him, which he noted Facon did not mention. Investigative journalist Arnaud Bédat, Gilles Bouleau, and Bernard Nicholas in their 1996 book Les Chevaliers de la mort praised the book and Facon's investigations, and interviewed Facon for the book. Caillet himself cited Facon's works, though did not always agree with Facon's telling of events; on others he concurred with Facon or said he was unsure. Facon played a role in the investigation of that case and was consulted by examining magistrate Luc Fontaine. In January 1996, he declared on Belgian TV that the OTS was still active in Belgium.

== Personal life ==
From 2001 to at least 2009, he was the deputy mayor of the French commune of Aniche; he said this was "out of friendship" for Michel Meurdesoif. He was later the deputy minister for culture of the commune. He co-authored a book with a local publishing house about the story of a cinema there. Facon supported Jean-Luc Mélenchon for the Left Front in the 2012 French presidential election.

== Bibliography ==
=== Fiction ===
- —— (1979). Mort au Gourou. Quotidien fantastique (in French). Saint-Pierre-lès-Nemours: Euredif. ISBN 2-7167-0763-4.
- —— (1987). Par le sabre des Zinjas. Anticipation (in French). Paris: Fleuve Noir. ISBN 2-265-03467-3.
- —— (1987). La planète des femmes. Anticipation (in French). Paris: Fleuve Noir. ISBN 2-265-03718-4.
- —— (1988). Divine entreprise. Anticipation (in French). Paris: Fleuve Noir. ISBN 2-265-03806-7.
- ——; Parent, Jean-Marie (1988). Les serviteurs de la force. Anticipation (in French). Paris: Fleuve Noir. ISBN 2-265-03890-3.
- —— (1992). Les compagnons de la lune blême. Anticipation (in French). Paris: Fleuve Noir. ISBN 2-265-04773-2.
- —— (1997). La Crypte. Série Noire (in French). Paris: Gallimard. ISBN 2-07-049756-9.
- —— (1999). Ailes de la gloire (in French). Atlas. ISBN 2-7312-1436-8.
- —— (2000). Flic suspendu n'est pas ripou. Instantanés de polar (in French). Paris: Baleine. ISBN 2-84219-255-9.
- —— (2000). Le requiem de John Edgar. Instantanés de polar (in French). Paris: Baleine. ISBN 2-84219-299-0.
- —— (2003). Rue Bicon. Pique rouge (in French). Vallauris: Atout. ISBN 2-912742-34-X.
- —— (2003). Sang pour sang glamour (in French). Rennes: Par hasard. ISBN 2-9520507-0-8.
- —— (2005). Dernier bistrot avant le cimetière (in French). Marseille: L'Écailler du Sud. ISBN 2-914264-75-5.
- —— (2006). L'équarisseur (in French). Marseille: L'Écailler du Sud. ISBN 2-914264-95-X.
- ——; Vilet, Michèle (2007). Méandres d'Escaut (in French). Douchy-les-Mines: Centre régional de la photographie Nord-Pas-de-Calais. ISBN 978-2-904538-84-1.
- —— (2007). Sherlock Holmes saisi par la débauche (in French). Paris: Baleine. ISBN 978-2-84219-436-9.
- —— (2008). À l'ombre des jeunes flics en pleurs (in French). Paris: Baleine. ISBN 978-2-84219-450-5.
- —— (2008). Rendez-nous Miss Moule ! (in French). Imbroglio. ISBN 978-2-914966-08-5.
- Houssin, Laurent; —— (2008). Rendez-nous Miss Moule ! (in French). Imbroglio. ISBN 978-2-914966-08-5.
- —— (2008). Pour venger mémère (in French). Paris: La Branche. ISBN 978-2-35306-030-6.
- —— (2010). On mourra tous américains (in French). Plougastel-Daoulas: Éditions du Barbu. ISBN 978-2-35998-015-8.
- ——, ed. (2010). Quartier: nouvelles (in French). Vieux-Condé: Éditions le Boulon. ISBN 978-2-9522884-3-9.
- —— (2011). Le saigneur des pierres (in French). DouaiI: Engelaere. ISBN 978-2-917621-10-3.
- —— (2013). Le Lion des Flandres (in French). Paris: Editions de l'Archipel. ISBN 978-2-8098-1056-1.
- —— (2013). Entretiens avec un très vieux vampire (in French). Douai: Engelaere éditions. ISBN 978-2-917621-17-2.
- —— (2015). La Templière. Collection Noire (in French). Encino: Black Coat Press. ISBN 978-1-61227-389-1.
- —— (2016). L'héritage du Sphinx (in French). Aniche: Abysses Éditions. ISBN 979-10-95648-04-8.
- —— (2016). Fulcanelli et les alchimistes rouges. Les cahiers d'Irem (in French). Paris: Les Éditions de l'Oeil du sphinx. ISBN 979-10-91506-49-6.
- —— (2017). Fulcanelli, commandeur du Temple. Les cahiers d'Irem (in French). Paris: Les Éditions de l'Oeil du sphinx. ISBN 979-10-91506-61-8.
- —— (2018). Fulcanelli et la géopolitique du diable. Les cahiers d'Irem (in French). Paris: Les Éditions de l'Oeil du sphinx. ISBN 979-10-91506-78-6.
- —— (2019). Fulcanelli confidentiel. Les cahiers d'Irem (in French). Paris: Les Éditions de l'Oeil du sphinx. ISBN 979-10-91506-97-7.
- —— (2019). Tuer pour Dagon. L'Anonyme d'Anvers (in French). Toulon: Les Presses du Midi. ISBN 978-2-8127-1073-5.
- —— (2020). Nicolas Flamel est Parmi Nous: Paris, Gisors, Rennes-Le-Château. Les Cahiers d'Irem (in French). Paris: Les Éditions de l'Oeil du sphinx. ISBN 978-2-380-14022-4.
- —— (2021). Arsène Lupin ou Les années excalibur (in French). Paris: Philippe Hugounenc éditeur. ISBN 978-2-492047-22-0.
- —— (2021). Bruxelles & Paris seront détruits: Ovnis gloriae mundi (in French). Paris: Philippe Hugounenc éditeur. ISBN 978-2-492047-16-9.
- —— (2021). Fulcanelli & les 7 loges du mal. Les cahiers d'Irem (in French). Paris: Les Éditions de l'Oeil du sphinx. ISBN 978-2-38014-030-9.
- —— (2022). Fulcanelli et le dernier mage du Louvre. Les cahiers d'Irem (in French). Paris: Les Éditions de l'Oeil du sphinx. ISBN 978-2-38014-052-1.
- —— (2023). Ils sont là. Les cahiers d'Irem (in French). Paris: Les Éditions de l'Oeil du sphinx. ISBN 978-2-38014-061-3.
- —— (2024). Fulcanelli & l'or des tombeaux perdus. Les cahiers d'Irem (in French). Paris: Les Éditions de l'Oeil du sphinx. ISBN 978-2-38014-094-1.
- —— (2025). Special Fulcanelli: Ils étaient derrière la main rouge. Les cahiers d'Irem (in French). Paris: Les Éditions de l'Oeil du sphinx. ISBN 978-2-380-14107-8.

=== Nonfiction ===
- —— (1978). Quand l'Atlantide resurgira. Connaissance de l'étrange (in French). Nice: Alain Lefeuvre. ISBN 2-902639-15-5.
- —— (1979). Le grand secret des Rose-Croix. Connaissance de l'étrange (in French). Nice: Alain Lefeuvre. ISBN 2-902639-22-8.
- ——; Parent, Jean-Marie (1980). Sectes et societes secretes aujourd'hui: le complot des ombres. Connaissance de l'étrange (in French). Nice: Alain Lefeuvre. ISBN 2-902639-31-7.
- ——; Parent, Jean-Marie (1981). Les Meurtres de l'occulte. Témoignages (in French). Nice: Alain Lefeuvre. ISBN 2-902639-76-7.
- ——; Parent, Jean-Marie (1981). La Flandre insolite: Le plat pays des magiciens. Les énigmes de l'univers (in French). Paris: Éditions Robert Laffont. ISBN 2-221-00783-2.
- ——; Parent, Jean-Marie (1982). Châteaux forts magiques de France. Les énigmes de l'univers (in French). Paris: Éditions Robert Laffont. ISBN 2-221-00981-9.
- ——; Parent, Jean-Marie (1983). Vercingétorix et les mystères gaulois. Les énigmes de l'univers (in French). Paris: Éditions Robert Laffont. ISBN 2-221-01149-X.
- ——; Parent, Jean-Marie (1984). Gilles de Rais et Jacques Coeur: La conspiration des innocents. Les énigmes de l'univers (in French). Paris: Éditions Robert Laffont. ISBN 2-221-04300-6.
- —— (1988). La Cité d'Ys. Ker-Ys (in French). Caen: IFDCR. ISBN 2-907451-01-4.
- —— (1988). Mois, Gille de Rais. Ker-Ys (in French). Caen: IFDCR.
- —— (1989). Les Rose-Croix vont-ils en enfer? (in French). Paris: Henri Veyrier. ISBN 2-85199-490-5.
- —— (1990). L'Or de Jérusalem: Nicolas Flamel et les clefs de l'énigme de Rennes-le-Château (in French). Paris: Montorgueil. ISBN 2-87874-010-6.
- —— (1994). Les dossiers secrets de Maurice Leblanc, père d'Arsène Lupin (in French). Brussels: Savoir pour Être. ISBN 2-87387-060-5.
- —— (1995). Vérité et révélations sur l'ordre du Temple solaire: Opération Faust, chronique d'un massacre annoncé (in French). Brussels: Savoir pour Être. ISBN 2-87387-068-0.
- Wzorek, Julien; Ottaviani, Serge; —— (2014). Le petit polonais (in French). Douai: Engelaere éditions. ISBN 978-2-917621-26-4.
- ——; Ottaviani, Serge (2015). La Fantastique aventure de l'Idéal-cinéma (in French). Aniche: Abysses Éditions. ISBN 979-10-95648-00-0.
- —— (2023). Les Templiers du Feu (in French). Saint-Nazaire-en-Royans: Energeia. ISBN 979-10-93492-60-5.
