= Francis Szpiner =

French politician and lawyer

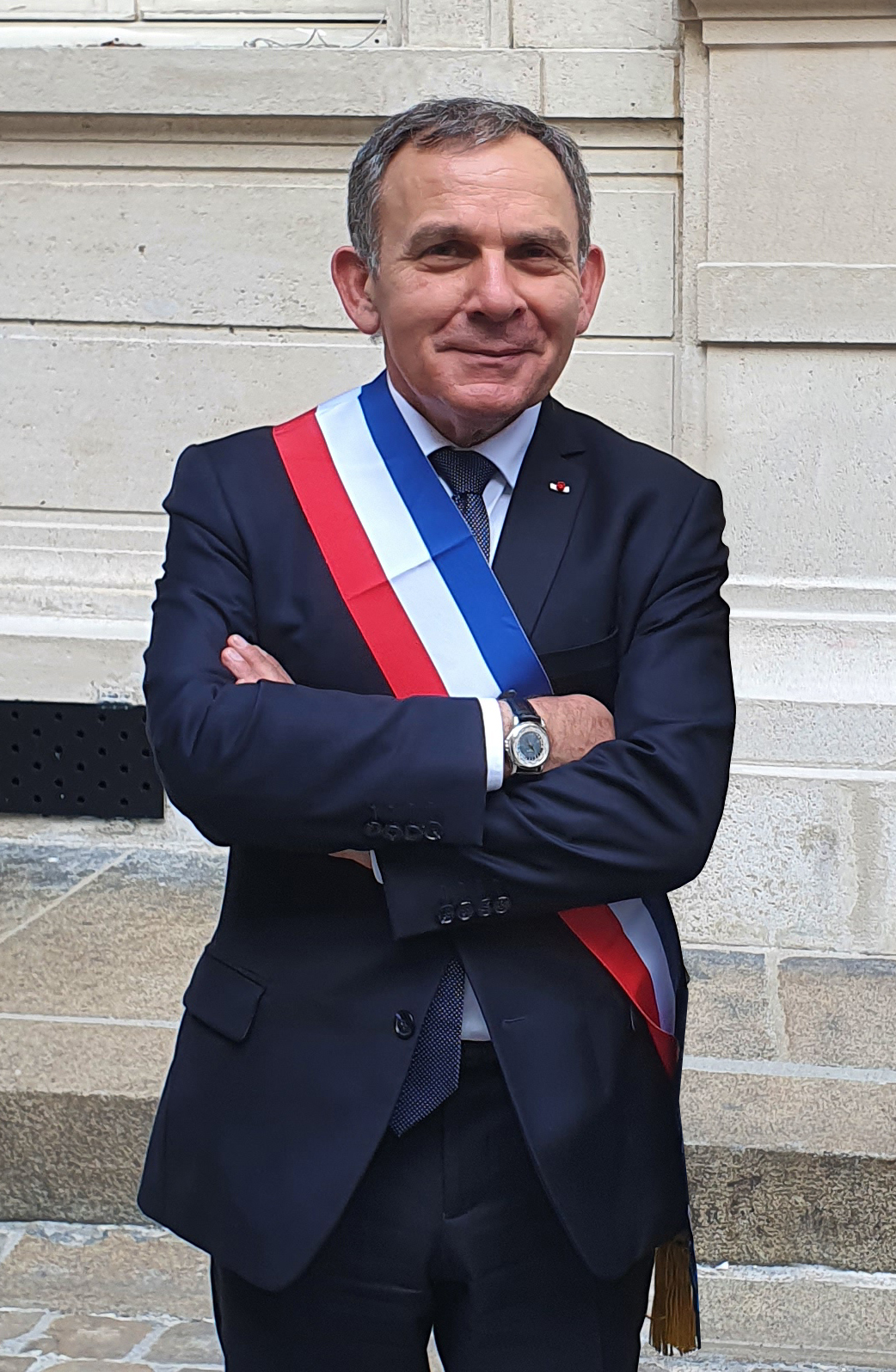
- Szpiner in 2020

Member of the French Senate for Paris
- Incumbent
- Assumed office 2 October 2023

Mayor of the 16th arrondissement of Paris
- In office 11 July 2020 – 7 November 2023
- Preceded by: Danièle Giazzi
- Succeeded by: Jérémy Redler

Councillor of Paris
- Incumbent
- Assumed office 28 June 2020
- Mayor: Anne Hidalgo

Personal details
- Born: 22 March 1954 (age 72) Paris, France
- Party: The Republicans
- Education: Lycée Jacques-Decour
- Alma mater: Panthéon-Assas University
- Profession: Lawyer

Francis Szpiner (born 22 March 1954) is a French lawyer, writer and politician of The Republicans who served as the mayor of the 16th arrondissement of Paris between 2020 and 2023. He was elected Senator of Paris in September 2023. He was an attorney for several prominent French politicians.

== Education and early life ==
He was born as the youngest of three siblings and the only son into a family with a Jewish-Polish background. His grandparents fled from the Nazis and his parents were printers. After he attended high school at the Lycée Jacques-Decour, he studied law and then joined, in the early 1970s, the Institute of Criminology in Paris of the Panthéon-Assas University. He became a lawyer and a member of the Paris Bar Association in 1975.

== Professional career ==
Throughout his career as a lawyer he represented several prominent clients before court and was a legal counselor to Jacques Chirac, Madame Claude or Bernard Tapie. Szpiner represented Jean-Bédel Bokassa, the former Emperor of the Central African Republic during his trial for treason and murder in the Central African capital Bangui. In June 1987, Bokassa was sentenced to death for murder, but acquitted from charges on cannibalism. In 2001, he represented Michel Tabachnik in his trial regarding the mass suicides organized by Order of the Solar Temple where Tabachnik was acquitted. In 2003, during Abdullah Öcalan's appeal at the European Court of Human Rights (ECHR) in Strasbourg, he was a lawyer representing the Turkish Government.

The ECHR ruled that Öcalan did not have a fair trial and ordered Turkey to pay a remuneration. He represented the former French Prime Minister and then Mayor of Bordeaux Alain Juppé in a trial, in which Juppé was accused of providing fictitious jobs in the city hall of Paris. Juppé was sentenced to a suspended prison sentence and given 10 year political ban in January 2004. Then he was the attorney for the relatives of the murdered Jewish Moroccan Ilhan Halimi. Halimi was sequestrated and killed by members of the Gang of Barbarians. The prosecution alleged Halimi was murdered for being a Jew and Szpiner obtained a life sentence for the gang leader in 2006, but demanded higher sentences for his accomplices. He also represented the entrepreneur Hubert Haddad who had been accused of bribing the President of French Polynesia Gaston Flosse.

Haddad and Flosse were both sentenced to five year imprisonment in October 2012. He represented the victims of Carlos the Jackal. For Carlos he obtained a life imprisonment. In 2013 he co-founded the Law Firm Stas & Associates In 2015 he represented Qatar who sued Florian Phillipot for repeatedly accusing Qatar of financing terrorism. He represented the Government of Senegal in a trial against the mayor of Dakar Khalifa Sall. The mayor of Dakar was sentenced to 5 years imprisonment for corruption charges in 2018 but pardoned by the Senegalese president Macky Sall in September 2019.

The authorities of the city of Paris's announced on 8 May 2024, that a high street, ergo a boulevard in France will be named after the 2024 murdered Vladimir Putin's opponent, Alexei Navalny, and designated as L 'avenue Alexei Navalny for the 16th arrondissement, very close to the Russian embassy in Paris, with a monument memorial for the generations to come, after the initiative by Francis Szpiner's idea.

== Political career ==
In 1990, he was appointed chief of staff to Alexandre Léontieff, then president of the government of French Polynesia; in 2002, he ran against Arnaud Montebourg in the sixth district of Saône-et-Loire. In the municipal elections of 2020, he was elected as the mayor of the 16th arrondissement of Paris representing The Republicans.

== Tayeb Benabderrahmane case (2020-) ==
In 2022, Franco-Algerian lobbyist Tayeb Benabderrahmane filed a complaint as a civil party for “kidnapping, unlawful detention with torture and acts of barbarity, criminal conspiracy, and extortion in an organized group” targeting Nasser al-Khelaïfi, president of Paris Saint-Germain, in connection with his possession of sensitive documents. Francis Szpiner was at the time one of Nasser al-Khelaïfi’s lawyers.

According to Benabderrahmane’s statements and evidence gathered by the French judiciary, negotiations were allegedly conducted from Paris between his relatives and Nasser al-Khelaïfi’s legal team, including Francis Szpiner, with the aim of obtaining the handover of confidential files in exchange for his release, as well as the signing of a confidentiality protocol with the PSG president. The claimant denounced this as a “forced deal” concluded while he was detained and deprived of his rights, and considered these discussions an organized extortion. The alleged role of Francis Szpiner in these negotiations, conducted outside any legal framework, remains unclear.

On 27 June 2023, the French Central Office for the Fight against Organized Crime searched Francis Szpiner’s law office and residence, alongside raids targeting Rachida Dati and Olivier Pardo. Investigators sought to determine whether lawyers for Nasser al-Khelaïfi, including Francis Szpiner, had participated in an organized extortion operation.

The Paris Bar association challenged the seizures carried out during these operations, arguing that they infringed attorney-client privilege. However, on 11 March 2025, the French Court of Cassation upheld the validity of the seizures (judgment no. 24-80.926), paving the way for the judicial use of documents recovered from Szpiner’s law office.

At the same time, in 2025, the United Nations Working Group on Arbitrary Detention recognized the arbitrary nature of Tayeb Benabderrahmane’s detention in Qatar, calling on the Qatari authorities to investigate the conditions of his deprivation of liberty and to provide reparation for the harm suffered.

== Books ==
- Fantôme de papier
- Mat d'echecs
- Une affaire de femmes was adapted for screen by Claude Chabrol as A story of women.
- Une affaire si facile

== Recognition ==
- April 2021 Lawyer of the month by Le Figaro.
- 2011 Legion of Honour
- 2000 Received the rank of an Officer of the French Order of Merit
