= TV8 (magazine) =

Swiss TV magazine

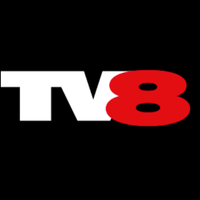
- Categories: Television magazine
- Frequency: Weekly
- Publisher: Ringier
- Founded: 1923
- First issue: 1923
- Final issue: 2023; 3 years ago
- Country: Switzerland
- Based in: Lausanne
- Language: French
- Website: tv8.ch
- ISSN: 1424-991X
- OCLC: 716114925

TV8 was a Swiss French-language weekly television magazine that was published by Ringier out of Lausanne. It was founded in 1923 under the name Le Radio, which merged with Je vois tout in 1953 to form Radio TV – Je vois tout. The name was changed to Radio TV8 in 1986, finally changed to simply TV8 six years later. In April 2023, it was merged into L'Illustré, another magazine published by Ringier.

== History ==
The magazine was founded as Le Radio in 1923. In 1953, Le Radio merged with another periodical by the same owners, Je vois tout, forming Radio TV – Je vois tout. It was published out of Lausanne. The magazine had a monthly illustrated supplemented called Arc-en Ciel in the 1970s.

It focused on largely TV and audiovisual media but also sometimes focused on informational and general/current events topics. The magazine was then the official outlet of the Swiss Broadcasting Corporation when it came to publication of its programs in French; despite this it had no publishing relationship with that organization and was independent from it.

In 1970, its circulation was 102,000, and it had a circulation of 110,000 in 1973. In 1970 it was the biggest weekly by circulation in Francophone Switzerland. In August 1986 it became Radio TV8. It again changed its name to simply TV8 in August 1992, which came alongside a layout change. It was sometimes called RTV 8.

In April 2023, it was merged into L'Illustré, another magazine published by Ringier. This was due to content overlap between the two magazines; L'Illustré was expanded as a result of the merged and TV8's typical content was folded into it. Laurence Desbordes, TV8's editor-in-chief, was made the new editor-in-chief of L'Illustré. The first issue of the merged magazine was published that month.

== Editors-in-chief ==
- Jacques-Dominique Rouiller (1976–????)
- Corinne Badoux (as of 1999)
- Laurence Desbordes (2022–2023)
