= Les Chevaliers de la mort =

1996 book

- Cover of the first edition
- Author: Arnaud Bédat; Gilles Bouleau; Bernard Nicolas
- Language: French
- Subject: Order of the Solar Temple
- Publisher: TF1 Éditions/L'Illustré
- Publication date: December 1996
- Publication place: France
- Pages: 350
- ISBN: 2-89111-707-7
- OCLC: 237730152
- Dewey Decimal: 289.9
- LC Class: BP605.O77 B43 1997 (Canadian ed.)

Les Chevaliers de la mort: Enquête et révélations sur l'Ordre du Temple Solaire (published as L'Ordre du Temple Solaire: Enquête et révélations sur les Chevaliers de l'Apocalypse in Canada) (Note: lit. 'The Knights of Death: Investigation and Revelations on the Order of the Solar Temple' and lit. 'The Order of the Solar Temple: Investigation and Revelations on the Knights of the Apocalypse') is a book by journalists Arnaud Bédat, Gilles Bouleau and Bernard Nicolas, covering the Order of the Solar Temple, notorious for the mass murder-suicides committed by the group in the 1990s. It was co-published in December 1996 by L'Illustré and TF1 Éditions, and published in Canada by Libre Expression the next month.

The book gives a background on the group's history, including the lives of its two leaders and the events leading up to the deaths. It further discusses the investigation itself, which it criticizes. The book was a bestseller in French speaking Switzerland. Its documentation and the information it provided was praised. Some of the book's theories about the background of the case and a potential political connection received a more mixed reception, with praise for it by some commentators but also criticism for being overly speculative.

== Background ==
The Order of the Solar Temple was a religious group active in several French speaking countries, notoriously responsible for several mass suicides and murders in the 1990s. It was led by Joseph Di Mambro and Luc Jouret. Arnaud Bédat was a Swiss journalist, an employee of L'Illustré, while Gilles Bouleau and Bernard Nicolas were French journalists for TF1. Bédat stated in an interview that it was "unimaginable" that the case had occurred in Switzerland, where "there hasn't been as spectacular a crime story in a long, long time, perhaps ever." He was personally sent to Quebec by his boss to investigate the case the day after it broke.

In writing the book, Bédat stated the intention of the authors was not to critically analyze the documents of the OTS, but instead to "start from scratch, trace all the leads and follow all the key players in this drama." He especially noted the background of the OTS's two leaders as areas they had viewed as neglected by other works and the official investigation.

== Contents ==
The book opens with a quote from each of the leaders of the group: "Man has no reason to exist. Let us all die now, the sun will not stop shining" (Jouret) and "We should have left six months before Waco. But what we will do will be more spectacular" (Di Mambro). The book then includes a prologue that covers the initial shock and discovery of the crime scene; it follows this with a chapter covering the initial investigation and the "mystery" of the initial 53 deaths.

Then, two chapters describing the prior lives of Di Mambro and Jouret, before tracing the history of the group, starting with its origins and the factors that lead to the deaths. The chapter on Di Mambro, titled "the master sorcerer", covers his esoteric and criminal background, while the chapter on Jouret, "the wounded child", presents his beginning involvement in homeopathy. It also follows his publicity in the media, noting that except for the magazine L'actualité (which had refused to publish an interview with him) most of the media were charmed by him and in their view complicit in his rise. They theorize that Di Mambro and Jouret had "other masters", and may be tied to a criminal conspiracy involving a far-right international organization, who they argue had suppressed the OTS after they began to make the news, and portrays them as having been "protected" by other forces, who had abandoned them after the fall of the USSR.

The authors argue that Jouret and Joël Egger (considered the official perpetrators of the deaths at Cheiry) were likely not the only perpetrators as there was forensic evidence suggesting the involvement of others; they suggest that the perpetrators of the later Vercors death, who were released by police, may have been involved. The authors say that given they were never interrogated it is impossible to know for sure. It concludes with an "autopsy of an investigation", where the authors discuss the investigation itself. The authors said they were surprised at how poorly protected the crime scenes were during their investigation, stating that they had entered "without problem" the house where the Dutoit family had been murdered by the group, and that they had simply entered the chalets left behind and found evidence that had not been examined. They argue the investigated was conducted too quickly. The book criticizes how journalists were treated in Salvan and what the authors perceive as the silence of Judge Jaquemet, and also criticizes religious scholars who in their view failed to intervene in the group to prevent the second massacre. Then follows several annexes, including several documents related to the OTS and its leaders, as well as a list of all the victims of the organization.

== Publication ==
The book was co-published in December 1996 by L'Illustre and TF1 Éditions. It sold 3,000 copies in one month and made it onto the French Swiss bestsellers list. It was published in Canada In January 1997 under the name L'Ordre du Temple Solaire: Enquête et révélations sur les Chevaliers de l'Apocalypse by Libre Expression. A second book on the OTS was written by the same three authors in 2000, L'Ordre du Temple solaire: Les Secrets d'une manipulation, published by Flammarion.

Following the book's publication in Quebec, Bédat spoke publicly warning about how he believed a third massacre by the group was a possibility, stating: "We really can't rule out that they are preparing a third massacre. The fact that the first and second have left legitimizes their faith, suggests that there is indeed an afterlife as they imagined. How far will these convinced followers go? The worst is still possible..." Only a few weeks after it had been published in Quebec, a third mass suicide by the group occurred there. A few days before the killings, Bédat had sent a fax warning a former member who lived in Canada to be careful, especially of members Bruno Klaus and Didier Quèze (who both orchestrated the third massacre); Klaus was once quoted in Les Chevaliers de la mort.

== Reception ==
The book's documentation and information were largely praised by reviewers, and several praised its writing as fascinating. Gilles Gaetner for the French magazine L'Express complimented it as "remarkably well-documented". Le Devoir described it as a "model work", while La Tribune described it as a work that would "fascinate everyone". La Liberté praised it as the "most comprehensive" work on the OTS. Journalist Éric Clément described it as the "most researched, the best documented" of works on the OTS. A review in the Valais-based Le Nouvelliste (the Swiss newspaper) was more critical and described the book as uneven depending on the topic covered, naming its theories about the political connection to be the most problematic.

Some of its theories on the case received a more mixed reception, particularly the "political-mafia" connection. Le Nouvelliste (the Swiss newspaper) described the book as uneven throughout, and criticized the book for speculating too much about the "political-mafia" connection. The review described the book as harshly criticizing the Swiss justice system and said it did not bring new information to the Valais aspect of the case. La Liberté praised its theories, describing the book's arguments as "quite different" from the official "minimalist" narrative. They said the book's conclusions were more logical than the official ones, which they called "embarrassing". Clément praised it for its theories and ideas as well as the factual information provided. Scholars Massimo Introvigne and Jean-François Mayer also disagreed with its theories on the political-mafia tie, saying that though there were tangible ties between the SAC and the OTS, the investigation had not borne out the authors' theories of a more direct connection. Reviewer Monique Giguère said it raised a number of embarrassing questions about the affair. Scholar Serge Caillet criticized the book for praising the book Vérité et révélations sur l'ordre du Temple solaire: Opération Faust, chronique d'un massacre annoncé by Roger Facon, a book which Caillet believed was not entirely accurate.

Following the third mass suicide, the book, and Bédat's statements discussing the possibility of another massacre, were discussed by several news outlets. Le Nouvelliste (the Canadian newspaper) described the book in the aftermath as giving a "complete and gripping" portrait of the OTS, noting its usage of previously unpublished testimonies and documents, though said it was "nonetheless European" and said Canadians may instead prefer the book Crois et meurs dans l'Ordre du temple solaire, a book written by a former member of the OTS. Le Devoir also criticized a lack of adaptions for a Quebec audience in the Canadian edition. Le Nouvelliste described Les Chevaliers de la mort's conclusions as "far from allaying concerns" about the group's ability to continue to be a threat.
