= Elijah Siegler =

Elijah Siegler is the chair of the Religious Studies department at the College of Charleston. He received his PhD in religious studies from the University of California at Santa Barbara, with an associates degree from Harvard University in comparative study of religion. He has authored two books, including New Religious Movements in 2007 and Coen: Framing Religion in Amoral Order in 2016, published by Baylor University Press. With David A. Palmer, he coauthored Dream Trippers: Global Daoism and the Predicament of Modern Spirituality. He has written for the online magazine Religion Dispatches.

== Bibliography ==
- —— (2007). New Religious Movements. Prentice Hall. ISBN 978-0-13-183478-1.
- —— (2016). Coen: Framing Religion in Amoral Order. Baylor University Press. ISBN 978-1-4813-0283-8.
- Palmer, David A.; —— (2017). Dream Trippers: Global Daoism and the Predicament of Modern Spirituality. University of Chicago Press. ISBN 978-0-226-48484-6.
