= Michel Tabachnik =

Swiss conductor and composer (born 1942)

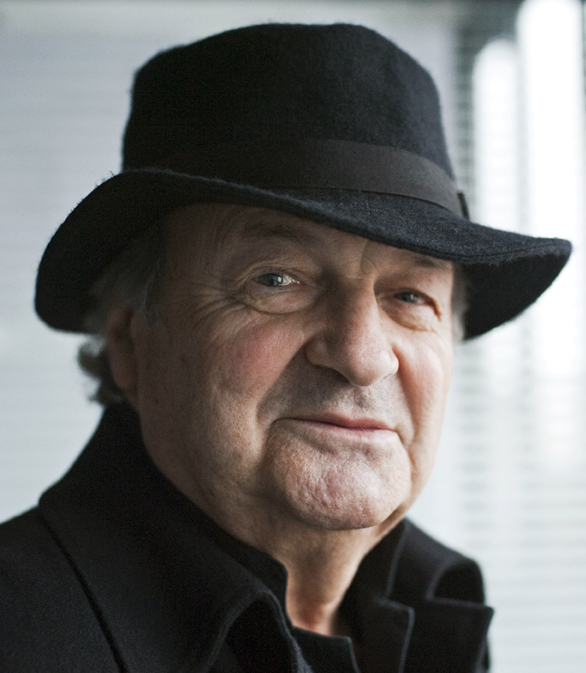
- Tabachnik in 2010
- Born: 10 November 1942 (age 83); Geneva, Switzerland
- Occupations: Conductor, composer, writer
- Spouse: Christine Meylan (div. 1981) Sabine Reuter (m. 1981)
- Children: 2
- Website: tabachnik.org

Michel Tabachnik (born 10 November 1942) is a Swiss conductor and composer with an international career. A promoter of contemporary music, he has premiered a dozen works by Iannis Xenakis, among others. He is also the author of essays on music and novels.

Tabachnik has an interest in esotericism and spirituality, and beginning in the 1970s he was a member of the Golden Way Foundation and its successor group the Order of the Solar Temple (OTS), run by Joseph Di Mambro. In 1994, the Solar Temple committed mass suicide, and following another mass suicide the next year, Tabachnik was investigated and tried twice for responsibility in the OTS deaths. Tabachnik was acquitted on all counts in both trials, and returned to conducting.

== Early life ==
Tabachnik was born in Geneva, Switzerland on 10 November 1942. His father was a trombonist. In 1976, the French Minister of Culture Michel Guy gave him creative control over the direction of two new orchestras. He got his degree in music theory.

As a young conductor he was a protégé of Igor Markevitch, Herbert von Karajan and Pierre Boulez, acting as the latter's assistant for four years, mainly with the BBC Symphony Orchestra, London. This led him to become closely involved with conducting and to perform many world premieres, particularly those of Iannis Xenakis.

== Early career ==
In June 1977, having an interest in esotericism, Tabachnik met Joseph Di Mambro, one of the two future leaders of the Order of the Solar Temple, a group notorious for mass suicides and murders in the 1990s. He had been introduced with his wife Christiane Meylan to La Pyramide, a precursor group, by Nicole Koymans; he joined the next year. He had two children with Meylan. In 1981, he became the president of the Golden Way Foundation that Di Mambro created.

Within the framework of the OTS, Tabachnik wrote the Archées, esoteric texts that circulated within the OTS. In 1981, he switched wives with Christian Pechot, also a member of the OTS, with Pechot marrying to Meylan and Tabachnik marrying Pechot's wife Sabine Reuter, who was a student of Di Mambro. He and Sabine moved to Toronto in 1984, as he found conductor work there, which Di Mambro used as a reason to move the group to Canada. Within the group, his son David was considered one of the "cosmic children", who would form an elite population following the end of the world.

He was Artistic Director of l'Orchestre des Jeunes du Québec (1985–1989) and, over a twelve-year period, l'Orchestre des jeunes de la Méditerranée which he founded in 1984. He has held the position of Chief Conductor of the Gulbenkian Orchestra in Lisbon, the Orchestre national de Lorraine, the Ensemble InterContemporain in Paris and the Northern Netherlands Orchestra (Groningen).

== Legal cases ==
The Solar Temple committed mass suicide and murder in 1994, killing 53 people. Among the dead were Meylan and Pechot, and Pechot and Meylan's son. Prior to the mass suicide Tabachnik had announced the end of the OTS. He largely escaped negative attention following the first deaths, but following the second mass suicide in December 1995, his name made headline news. His stated defense at the time was that he had little to do with the OTS, which backfired when more evidence came out and this was found to be untrue.

Despite a lack of evidence implicating him in any crime, Tabachnik was investigated. This resulted in two trials in 2001 and 2006. On 25 June 2001, the court acquitted Tabachnik, on the basis that there had been no conclusive proof found of any involvement, and his writings accused of influencing the members into death were deemed unlikely to have influenced them. The appeals court upheld the lower court's ruling, and he was acquitted a second time in December 2006.

== Later career ==
As a result of the investigation related to the OTS, Tabachnik had lost most of his work as a conductor and had to pause his career. Following his acquittal, Tabachnik returned to being a conductor.

Since September 2005, Tabachnik is chief-conductor of the Noord Nederlands Orkest (NNO). From 2008 until 2015, Tabachnik was the music director and chief-conductor of the Brussels Philharmonic.

Speaking on his involvement with the OTS, Tabachnik appeared in two 2022 documentary series on the case, Temple Solaire: l'enquête impossible and La Fraternité. Temple Solaire: l'enquête impossible also featured journalists Gilles Bouleau and Arnaud Bédat, both who had accused of him of being involved in the deaths. During an interview for the promotion of the series, Bédat stated he had changed his mind and no longer believed that Tabachnik had planned the deaths, and that him being away in concert had perhaps stopped him from being killed as well.

== Publications ==
- Bouc émissaire: Dans le piège du Temple Solaire
- Il était une fois un enfant, novel, publisher de l'Aire, 1999.
- De la Musique avant toute chose, essay, préface by Régis Debray, Essai, éd. Buchet/Chastel, 2008.
- L’Homme sauvage, novel, publisher Ring, 2013.
- Ma Rhapsodie, essay, publisher Buchet/Chastel, 2016.
- Le Libraire de Saint-Sulpice, novel, publisher Otago 2017.
- L’Enlèvement au Sinaï, novel, publisher Otago, 2019.
- Demain au Marmara Taskim, novel, publisher L'Harmattan, 2022.
- La Pierre de Siloé, novel, publisher L'Harmattan, 2022.

== Compositions ==
- Supernovae, 1967
- Frise, 1968
- Fresque, 1969
- Invention à 16 voix, 1972
- Mondes, 1972
- Sillages, 1972
- D'autres Sillages, 1972
- Movimenti, 1973
- Éclipses, 1974
- Argile, 1974
- Trois Impressions, 1975
- Les Perséïdes, 1981
- Cosmogonie, 1981
- l'Arch, 1982
- 7 Rituels Atlantes, 1984
- Pacte des onze (Évangile selon Thomas), 1985
- Élévation, 1990
- Prélude à la Légende, 1989
- Le Cri de Mohim, 1991
- Évocation, 1994
- La Légende de Haïsha, 1989
- Concerto pour piano et orchestre de chambre, 2003
- Nord pour orchestre, 2006
- Diptyque-écho, Concerto pour violon et orchestre, 2008
- Genèse, pour violon solo et orchestre, 2010
- Lumières fossiles, pour orchestre, 2011
- Benjamin, dernière nuit, opéra, 2012
- Le livre de Job, 2013
- Benjamin, dernière nuit, drame lyrique en quatorze scènes, 2016
- "Sumer", concerto pour violoncelle et orchestre, 2019
- "Genèse II", concerto pour violon et orchestre, 2021
