= Arnaud Bédat =

Swiss journalist and author (1965–2023)

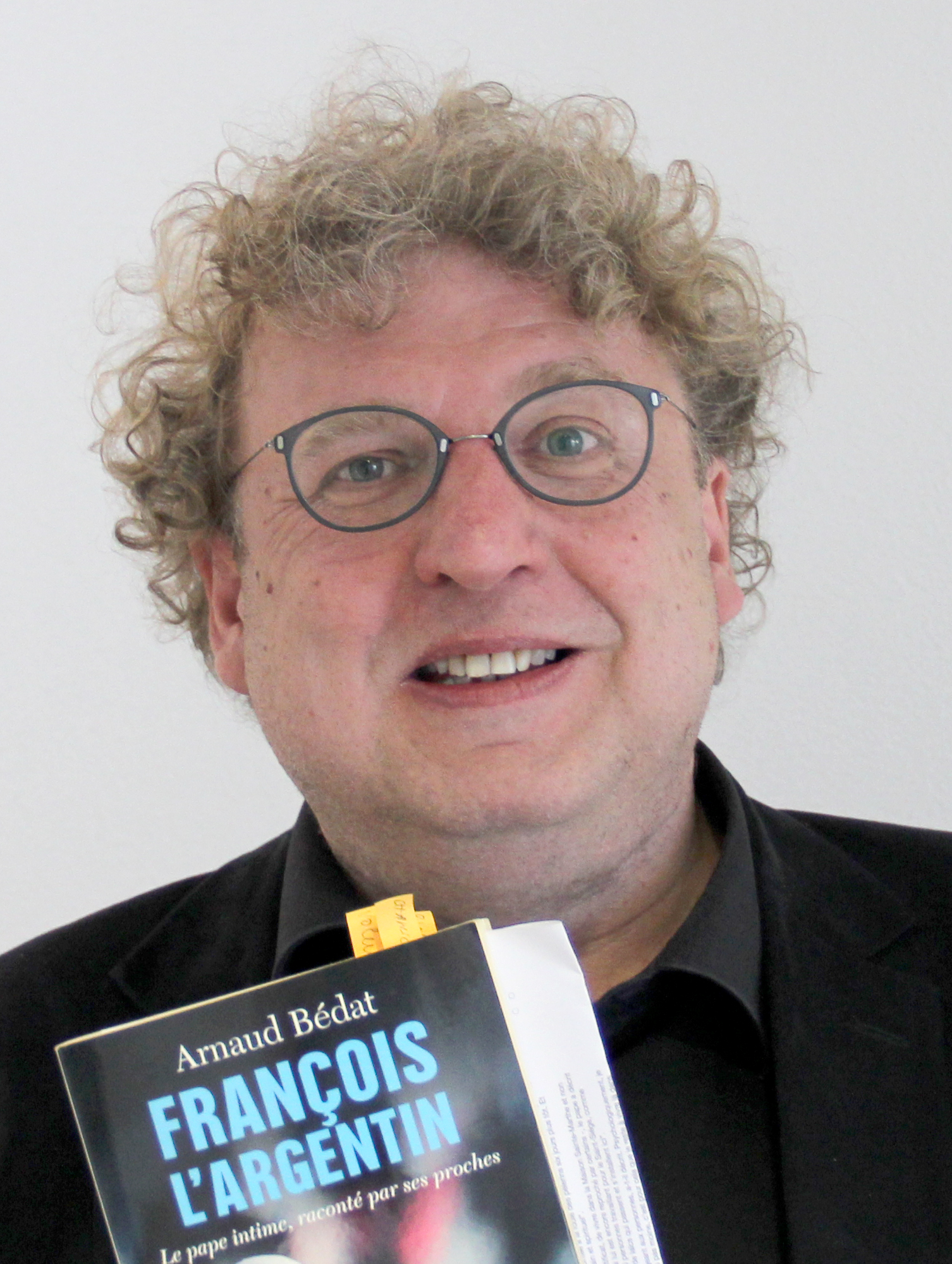
- Bédat, pictured in 2015.
- Born: 8 March 1965; Porrentruy, Canton of Jura, Switzerland
- Died: 20 July 2023 (aged 58)
- Employer: L'Illustré
- Children: 1

Arnaud Bédat (8 March 1965 – 20 July 2023) was a Swiss journalist and author. He worked for L'Illustré. His works often focused on high profile cases, including the Swissair Flight 111 and the Order of the Solar Temple. Other books of his covered Pope Francis and the disappearance of French TV host Philippe de Dieuleveult. He was a regular commentator on French television, particularly Faites entrer l'accusé, C dans l'air, Zone d'ombre, and 50 minutes Inside.

== Early life ==
Bédat was born in Porrentruy in the Canton of Jura in Switzerland on 8 March 1965. He has two siblings. As a child, he took an apprenticeship as a bookseller, and later wrote freelance for the local newspaper Le Démocrate.

== Career ==
In 1983 he was featured on the game show La Course autour du monde, where he interviewed the brother of Mahatma Gandhi's assassin Nathuram Godse. Following this experience, he worked at the Swiss newspaper L'Express. In 1992, he became a reporter for the Swiss magazine L'Illustré, and sometimes Paris Match. As a commentator, he was regularly called onto French TV shows, particularly Faites entrer l'accusé, C dans l'air, Zone d'ombre, and 50 minutes Inside, as well as Vivement dimanche.

He was a significant figure in the investigation of the high profile Order of the Solar Temple cult case, in which many members of the Solar Temple committed mass suicide in Switzerland. For his investigation into it he traveled to many different countries. During the investigation, he convinced a policeman to give him several photos relevant to the case, which were later published in L'Illustré. His first book covered the disappearance of Philippe de Dieuleveult, the host of the French game show La Chasse aux trésors. Alongside journalists Gilles Bouleau and Bernard Nicolas, he wrote a 1996 book on the OTS case, Les Chevaliers de la mort, followed by the 2000 book L'Ordre du Temple solaire: Les Secrets d'une manipulation. Their investigation into the affair was covered in the 2022 documentary series Temple Solaire: l'enquête impossible. He wrote a book about Belgian singer Jacques Brel, and two books about Pope Francis.

In 2004, Bédat was fined 4,000 Swiss francs for violating the right to privacy of a motorist (who had killed three people and injured eight) by publishing an article the prior year revealing secret documents relevant to the case. The motorist himself did not file any complaint, but the government tried him for having published the documents. He had initially been given a suspended prison sentence, but this was replaced with the fine. The European Court of Human Rights eventually ruled this a violation of freedom of expression and the Swiss government was ordered to pay Bédat €5,000. He interviewed controversial Russian businessman Sergei Mikhailov. During an investigation into election fraud in Porrentruy in 2012, he recorded a person without their knowledge in an effort to prove voter fraud. This resulted in a long legal process, but he was eventually acquitted by the Federal Supreme Court of Switzerland.

Other cases he covered were the Swissair Flight 111, Bertrand Cantat, and Roman Polanski affairs. He also covered affairs local to Jura, including that of a prolific fraudster, André Plumey. In 2021, he left his job at L'Illustré. In 2022, a fictionalized version of him was a major character in the long-running French comic Lefranc, in the issue Le scandale Arès. The creator of the comic, Régric, had regularly heard Bédat on the radio show L'Heure du crime. He was also featured in the documentary Dieuleveult, les disparus du fleuve, which covers the disappearance of de Dieuleveult.

== Personal life ==
He had a daughter.

== Death ==
Bédat died on 20 July 2023, at the age of 58, following an illness. At the time of his death, he had been working on a book, which was left unfinished.

== Publications ==
- —— (1988). L'Enigme Dieuleveul (in French). Favre. ISBN 978-2-8289-0231-5.
- ——; Bouleau, Gilles; Nicolas, Bernard (1996). Les Chevaliers de la mort: Enquête et révélations sur l'Ordre du Temple Solaire (in French). Paris: TF1 Éditions. ISBN 978-2-87761-148-0.
- ——; Bouleau, Gilles; Nicolas, Bernard (2000). L'Ordre du Temple Solaire: les secrets d'une manipulation (in French). Flammarion. ISBN 978-2-08-067842-3.
- —— (2014). François l'Argentin: Le pape intime raconté par ses proches (in French). Pygmalion. ISBN 978-2-7564-1120-0.
- —— (2017). François, seul contre tous: Enquête sur un pape en danger (in French). Flammarion. ISBN 978-2-0813-8856-7.
- —— (2018). Voir un ami voler: Les dernières années de Jacques Brel (in French). Plon. ISBN 978-2-259-26340-5.
