= Gilles Bouleau =

French journalist and news presenter

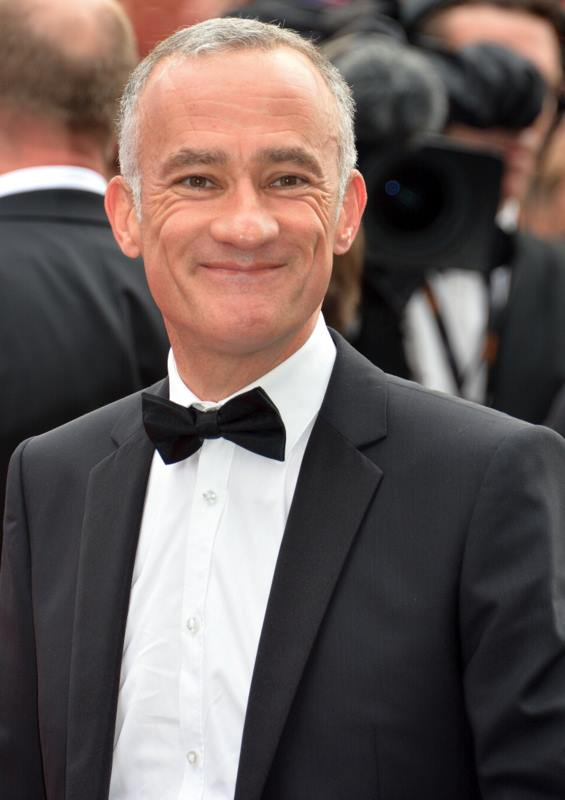
- Gilles Bouleau at the 2016 Cannes Film Festival.
- Born: 25 May 1962 (age 62); Paris, France
- Occupation(s): Journalist, television presenter, news anchor
- Years active: 1986–present
- Television: TF1 (1986–present); LCI (1996–present)
- Children: 2

Gilles Bouleau (born 25 May 1962) is a French journalist. As a journalist and reporter on TF1 and LCI for several years, he spent several years in other countries as a correspondent in London and Washington. Head of special operations since 2011, he became the news anchor of the Journal de 20 heures on TF1 since June 2012, succeeding Laurence Ferrari.

== Early life and education ==
Gilles Bouleau was born in Paris but spend his childhood in Colombes in the department of Hauts-de-Seine. He studied and graduated at the Centre de Formation des Journalistes (CFJ) of Paris and at the Institut d'Études Politiques of Paris (Sciences Po).

== Television career ==
In 1986, Gilles Bouleau joined the redaction service of TF1. He passed by the economic and social services, domestic policy, reportages and general information. He then presented all kind of reportages like Yugoslavia in 1987, the French presidential election of 1988, the 1992 and 1994 Winter Olympics.

From 1996 to 1999, he presented the morning program on the news channel LCI. In 1999, he became the editor-in-chief assistant of the program 19 h dimanche, which consisted of reportages and interviews presented by Ruth Elkrief on TF1.

In June 2001, he began an international phase as a correspondent on TF1 in London. Four years later in July 2005, shortly after the 7 July and the 21 July 2005 London bombings, he left the British capital for Washington and became since August of that year the correspondent in the United States for five years. He reported several important events of the country such as the Katrina Hurricane that happened the same month as his arrival, or the United States presidential election of 2008 won by Barack Obama.

In July 2011, he came back to Paris and became the substitute presenter of Laurence Ferrari for the Journal de 20 heures after the departure of Harry Roselmack. The next month, he succeeded Jean-Claude Narcy as the head of the special operations. In June 2012, after the resignation of Laurence Ferrari, he was named for presenting temporarily the Journal de 20 heures. Soon after, he became the new presenter of the evening news on TF1.

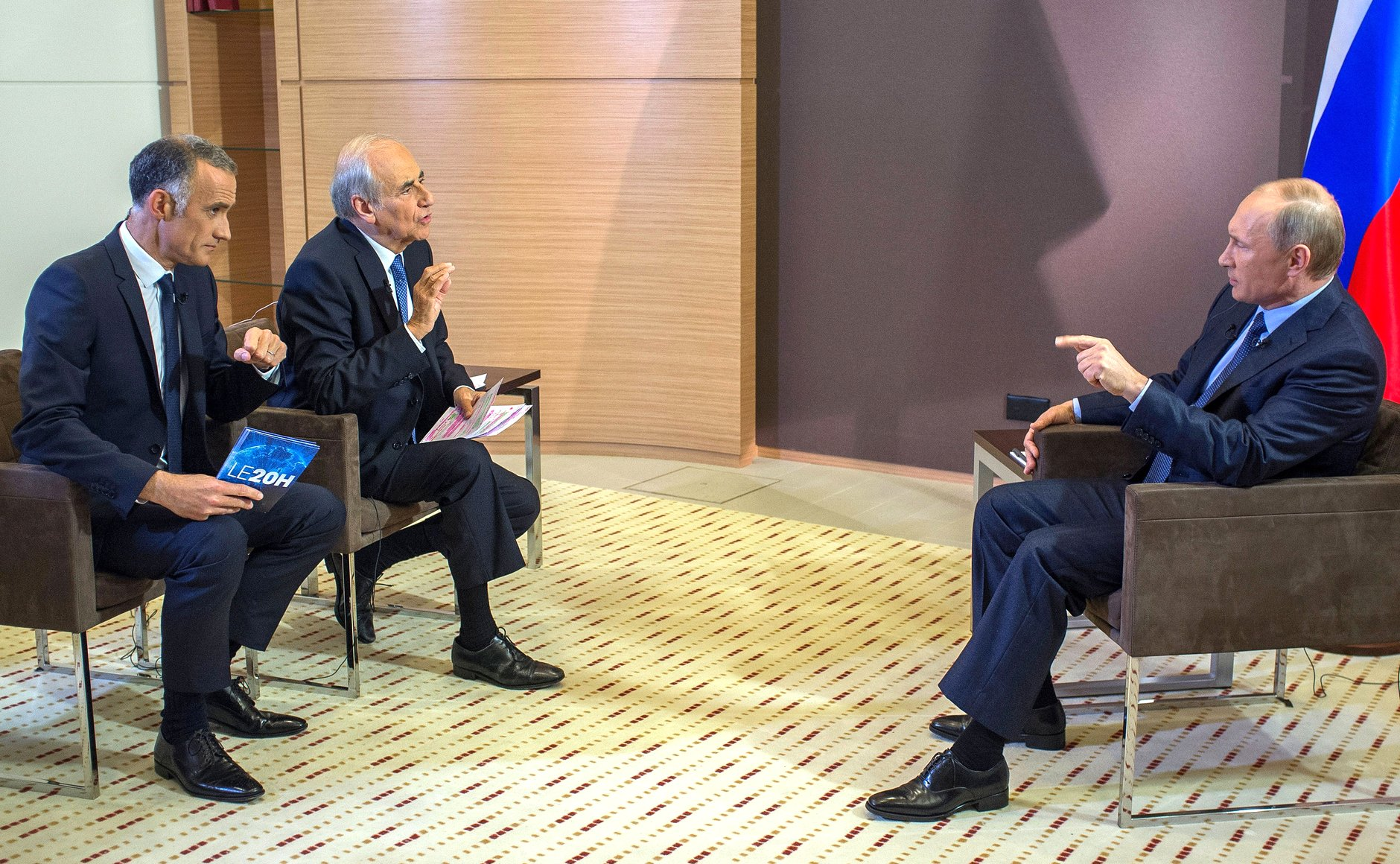
The interview with Vladimir Putin, alongside Jean-Pierre Elkabbach.

Since 2012, he also presented the election evening programs on TF1 such as the French municipal elections of 2014, the European elections of 2014 in France, the French regional elections of 2015 and the French presidential election of 2017. He presented with Claire Chazal and then with Anne-Claire Coudray. In June 2014, TF1 broadcast an interview of Russian president Vladimir Putin made by Gilles Bouleau and Jean-Pierre Elkabbach. The next month, he interviewed with David Pujadas the French president François Hollande, and interviews him a second time in November 2014 with Yves Calvi in the program En direct avec le président on TF1.

In February 2015, he presented with Christophe Dechavanne the special program TF1, 40 ans d'émotions partagées to celebrate the 40th anniversary of the channel, essentially composed of archives. Since June 2016, he presents the new program about politics on TF1 titled Vie politique, broadcast occasionally on Sunday evening and live. During the 2017 French presidential election, he hosted alongside Coudray the debate between the top five candidates on 20 March, as well as the program Demain Président in the lead-up to the first round.

Bouleau was involved in the investigation of the Order of the Solar Temple, on which he wrote two books, Les Chevaliers de la mort and L'Ordre du Temple solaire: Les Secrets d'une manipulation, with coauthors Arnaud Bédat and Bernard Nicolas in 1996 and 2000, respectively. Their investigation into the affair was covered in the 2022 documentary series Temple Solaire: l'enquête impossible.

== Personal life ==
Gilles Bouleau is married to a journalist and has two daughters.

== Publications ==
- Bédat, Arnaud; ——; Nicolas, Bernard (1996). Les Chevaliers de la mort: Enquête et révélations sur l'Ordre du Temple Solaire (in French). Paris: TF1 Éditions. ISBN 978-2-87761-148-0.
- Bédat, Arnaud; ——; Nicolas, Bernard (2000). L'Ordre du Temple solaire: Les Secrets d'une manipulation (in French). Flammarion. ISBN 978-2-08-067842-3.
