= L'Illustré =

Swiss consumer magazine

- Categories: Consumer magazine
- Frequency: Weekly
- Publisher: Ringier Médias Suisse
- Founded: 1921
- First issue: 10 September 1921; 104 years ago
- Company: Ringier
- Country: Switzerland
- Based in: Lausanne
- Language: French
- Website: www.illustre.ch
- ISSN: 1420-5165
- OCLC: 637740923

L'Illustré (French pronunciation: [lilystʁe]) is a weekly consumer magazine published in Lausanne, Switzerland. It is one of the oldest magazines published in the country and has been in circulation since 1921.

== History and profile ==
L'Illustré was first published in Romandie on 10 September 1921. The magazine was printed and published in Zofingen. During its initial phase, it covered French translations of the articles published in the Swiss German magazine SIZ. Over time it had its own editorial profile, leaving its German focus.

L'Illustré is part of the Ringier AG and is based in Lausanne. The magazine was published on a weekly basis by L'illustré publishing. As of 2012 Michel Jeanneret was the editor-in-chief. In December 2014 Ringier AG and Axel Springer SE reported that they would establish a new joint venture under the name of Ringier Axel Springer Medien Schweiz and that L'Illustré would be part of this company among the other publications. The partnership of the companies ended in late 2020, and Ringier took over Axel Springer's stake. Following the transaction the Ringier Médias Suisse (French: Ringier Media Switzerland) became the publisher of L'Illustré.

L'Illustré is a popular magazine, and covers both celebrity portraits and ideas for the families. In the 1970s it included a section on radio and television programs which led to increase in its circulation figures. In April 2010, for its 90th anniversary, the magazine was given a special edition. The same was done for its 100 year anniversary in 2021. It also launched a three week exhibition.

The weekly TV magazine TV8 was merged into L'Illustré in April 2023. The editor-in-chief of L'Illustré was Stéphane Benoit-Godet between 2020 and January 2023. He was succeeded by Laurence Desbordes in the post.

== Circulation ==
Between July 2004 and June 2005 L'Illustré sold 108,798 copies. The circulation of the magazine was 106,144 copies between July 2005 and June 2006 and 104,279 copies between July 2006 and June 2007. Its circulation became 99,547 copies between July 2007 and June 2008. L'Illustré sold 76,697 copies in 2014, and its readership was 338,000 in the second half of 2014.

== See also ==
- List of magazines in Switzerland
