= Gnostic church =

Gnostic church may refer to a variety of Gnostic religious organizations. Various Gnostic churches include:

- Bosnian Church
- Ecclesia Gnostica
- Ecclesia Gnostica Catholica
- Ecclesia Pistis Sophia
- Gnostic Church of France
- Johannite Church
- Neo-Luciferian Church

== See also ==
- Gnosticism in modern times
- List of Gnostic sects
- Mandi (Mandaeism)
