= Gnostic Mass =

A Gnostic Mass is a liturgical Mass administered by a Gnostic church. There are several such churches, each with its own version of the Mass. Some of them are:

- The Gnostic Holy Eucharist, celebrated by Ecclesia Gnostica
- Liber XV, The Gnostic Mass, written by Aleister Crowley for Ecclesia Gnostica Catholica
