= Sovereign Military Order of the Temple of Jerusalem =

Neo-Templar orders

- Ordre Souverain et Militaire du Temple de Jérusalem
- Formation: 1932; 94 years ago
- Type: Neo-Templar
- Formerly called: Sovereign Military Order of the Temple

The Sovereign Military Order of the Temple of Jerusalem (Latin: Ordo Supremus Militaris Templi Hierosolymitani, OSMTH, French: Ordre Souverain et Militaire du Temple de Jérusalem, OSMTJ), founded as the Sovereign Military Order of the Temple (French: Ordre souverain et militaire du Temple) are a group of associations commonly originating from the revivalist Order of the Temple which was formed in 1804 by Bernard-Raymond Fabré-Palaprat.

== Background ==
The Order of the Temple, a revivalist organization, was founded in 1804 by Bernard-Raymond Fabré-Palaprat, later founder of the Johannite Church, who claimed that he had discovered that the Knights Templar had never gone away and that there was a continued line of Grand Masters to the present day.

== History ==
The Order of the Temple's Belgian branch, KVMRIS, encouraged the formation of the International Secretariat of Templars in Brussels in 1894. The Belgian branch eventually created in 1932 as the Sovereign and Military Order of the Temple, under the regent Théodore Covias (there were too few members to have a Grand Master). He was succeeded by Emile-Clément Vandenberg who was elected three years later.

The order's archives were given to Antonio Campello Pinto de Sousa Fontes during WWII in Portugal; shortly after, he proclaimed himself the Grand Master, resulting in neo-Templarism spreading internationally. In 1945, Fontes changed the name to Ordre souverain et militaire du Temple de Jérusalem, OSMTJ. He designated his son Fernando Campello Pinto de Sousa Fontes as his successor, but as several other independent branches refused to recognize Antonio's authority, when he died several groups instead declared their independence. In a 1970 Paris meeting, several Grand Priorates, all who rejected Antonio's rule, instead appointed Antoine Zdrojewski as the grand master.

This resulted in two separate primary neo-Templar international groups: the group that recognized Sousa Fontes, the Ordo Supremus Militari Templi Hierosolymitani (OSMTH), and the group that recognized Zdrojewski, the OSMTJ. The OSMTH sometimes uses the French name and acronym of OSMTJ. Zdrojewski became embroiled in a number of political controversies, and Sousa Fontes failed to control all of his authorized priorates; this resulted in more organizations arising, and several independent priorates emerging besides OSMTJ and OSMTH. Zdrojewski was later succeeded by Georges Lamirand, who died in 1994. In 1997, OSMTH voted to expel Grand Master Fernando de Sousa Fontes from the order. This resulted in another schism with those loyal to Fontes forming a new organization presently known as OSMTH-Regency while the remainder of the organization continued on as OSMTH.

In the mid to late 90s, many neo-Templars tried to "reduce the number of acronyms" and reconcile the differences between the many groups, including the split between OSMTJ and OSMTH. These reconciliation attempts failed for a variety of reasons and new schisms emerged in the meantime, though there did come the success of one agreement between OSMTJ and the federation OIMT, which aimed to create a real association; the OSMTJ was also merged with the IFA group in Turku, Finland in 1998.

== Beliefs and practices ==
They formerly claimed to be direct descendants of the Knights Templar through the Larmenius Charter, but have since recanted this.
