= Carl William Hansen =

Danish bishop and occultist (1872–1936)

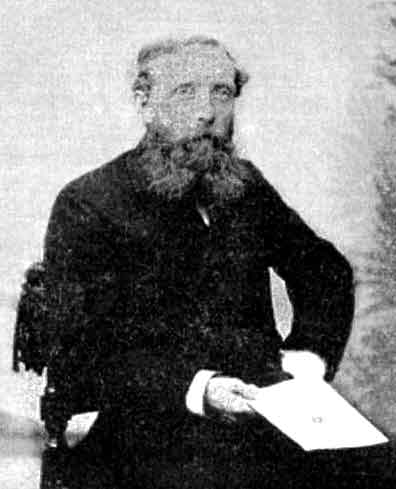
- Portrait of Hansen, prior to 1928
- Born: October 11, 1872; Copenhagen, Denmark
- Died: August 3, 1936 (aged 63); Denmark
- Other name: Ben Kadosh
- Occupations: Dairy farmer, occultist, wandering bishop
- Known for: Luciferian writings, Martinism, fringe Masonic charters
- Notable work: Den ny morgens gry (1906)

Carl William Hansen (11 October 1872 – 3 August 1936) was a Danish dairy farmer, Luciferian, wandering bishop, and occultist. Born in Copenhagen and first initiated into Martinism in 1898 by Alphonse Wallen, Hansen used the pseudonym Ben Kadosh to publish Den ny morgens gry: verdensbygmesterens genkomst (transl. The Dawn of a New Morning: The Return of the World's Master Builder) in 1906.

Inspired by the French Gnostic movement and such writers as Carl Kohl, his major interests seem to have been alchemy and astrology. Until 1905 he was in communication with Swedish playwright and alchemist August Strindberg. Some of Hansen's occult ideas inspire the Neo-Luciferian Church today.

In September 1921, Theodor Reuss issued fringe masonic charters to Hansen for Gnostic Primas, Memphis & Misraim, Ordo Templi Orientis, and the Hermetic Brotherhood of Light. In 1923, he founded a Martinist lodge in Denmark, later dissolved and rebuilt as the lodge The Three Columns. This lodge formed part of The Danish Grand Orient, chartered by Joanny Bricaud in Lyon as Grand Orient de la vraie et haute Maçonnerie ésoterique et gnostique du Danemark. The Danish Grand Orient worked until 1929 when it merged with the Grand Orient of Denmark and the North and formed The Grand Lodge of Denmark, an irregular Masonic body.

Biographies of Hansen have been written by Peder Byberg Madsen and Bjarne Salling Pedersen and included in the 2006 reissue of Den ny morgens gry: verdensbygmesterens genkomst.
