= Tau Malachi =

American spiritual writer

- Born: Bret C. Cagle; 1962 (age 63–64); United States
- Occupations: Spiritual teacher and guide and author
- Religion: Gnosticism
- Church: Ecclesia Pistis Sophia
- Ordained: by Tau Elijah in 1975
- Writings: The Gnostic Path of St. Thomas; The Gnostic Gospel of St. Thomas; Gnosis of the Cosmic Christ; Living Gnosis; St. Mary Magdalene; Gnostic Healing; Gnosis of Guadalupe
- Offices held: Gnostic Apostle of Ecclesia Pistis Sophia
- Title: Gnostic Apostle, Sacred Tau
- Website: sophian.org

Tau Malachi (full name: Tau Malachi eben Ha-Elijah; born Bret Cagle in 1962) is an American neo-Gnostic religious leader and writer. He is currently the Gnostic Apostle of Ecclesia Pistis Sophia, also known as The Fellowship.

Tau Malachi is the current lineage holder of the Sophian Gnostic tradition. Although members claim that the lineage dates back to the 1700s, the current tone of Ecclesia Pistis Sophia was revealed in the 1880s by Tau Miriam, an Englishwoman. She initiated her protégé Tau Elijah, who left England in the early twentieth century to establish the lineage in the Bay Area of Northern California. In the 1960s, Tau Elijah retired from public teaching and initiating to live in the Lake Tahoe basin, where he died in the 1970s.

== Biography ==
Tau Malachi was born Bret Cagle in 1962 in the United States, and was 8 years old when he met his spiritual leader Tau Elijah. As a disciple of Tau Elijah during the 1970s, he received the spiritual name Tau Malachi eben Ha-Elijah.

In 1983, Tau Malachi founded The Fellowship.

Tau Malachi has also been initiated into the Martinist Tradition, though he does not practice in that tradition. Other than Christian Kabbalah and the Gnostic Path, he has also studied and participated in Vajrayana Buddhism, Vedanta, Sufism, and Native American shamanism.

Tau Malachi currently resides in Grass Valley, California.

== Books ==
Books by Tau Malachi:

- Tau Malachi (2004). The gnostic Gospel of St. Thomas: meditations on the mystical teachings. St. Paul, Minn: Llewellyn Publications. ISBN 978-0-7387-0499-9. OCLC 54677610.
- —— (2005). Gnosis of the Cosmic Christ: a Gnostic Christian Kabbalah. St. Paul, Minn: Llewellyn Publications. ISBN 978-0-7387-0591-0. OCLC 56510349.
- —— (2005). Living gnosis: a practical guide to gnostic Christianity. St. Paul, Minn: Llewellyn Publications. ISBN 978-0-7387-0718-1. OCLC 57564851.
- —— (2006). St. Mary Magdalene: the Gnostic tradition of the holy bride. Woodbury, Minn: Llewellyn Publications. ISBN 978-0-7387-0783-9. OCLC 62089969.
- —— (2010). Gnostic healing: revealing the hidden power of God. Woodbury, Minn: Llewellyn Publications. ISBN 978-0-7387-1983-2. OCLC 424560073.
- —— (2017). Gnosis of Guadalupe: A Mystical Path of the Mother. EPS Press. ISBN 978-0-692-81095-8.
- —— (2023). The Gnostic Path of St. Thomas. St. Paul, Minn: Llewellyn Publications. ISBN 978-0-7387-7565-4. OCLC 1373831290.

== See also ==
- Stephan A. Hoeller
