= Doinel =

Doinel is a surname. Notable people with the surname include:

- Antoine Doinel, fictional character created by François Truffaut in five films
- Jules Doinel (1842–1903), French archivist and founder of a Gnostic church
