= Neo-Templarism =

Knights Templar revivalism

Neo-Templarism comprises groups or people who claim to have revived or to be descendants of the Knights Templar. These orders are very diverse, but typically draw from western esotericism, with some groups incorporating New Age beliefs, or Freemasonry. Many neo-Templar groups are secret initiatory societies. Other groups are only ceremonial, and attempt to replicate what they view as the chivalric ideals of the original Knights Templar without any esoteric elements.

Following the dissolution of the Templars by Pope Clement V at the start of the 14th century, several organizations have claimed to be secret continuations of the original Templars. This idea has been criticized by scholars of Templar history and is widely regarded as dubious. The notion of the Templars secretly surviving within Freemasonry resulted in the creation of several Templar grades in Freemason organizations, which evolved into independent neo-Templarism in the early 19th century. The origins of most neo-Templar groups can be traced to a revivalist Templar order founded by French physician Bernard-Raymond Fabré-Palaprat in 1805.

== Background ==
The Knights Templar (also called the Order of the Temple, French: Ordre du Temple) were a military-religious and monastic order, that was created by a few knights, among them Hugh de Payens and Geoffrey de Saint-Omer in 1119 in Jerusalem. At the 1128 Council of Troyes in France, led by Bernard of Clairvaux, it was officially approved. They were founded with the goal to protect pilgrims traveling to Jerusalem from Europe, but became well known for their participation in the Crusades. The Templars began to acquire wealth and power, from which they made several enemies. At the beginning of the fourteenth century, they began to face accusations of witchcraft and heresy. They were persecuted by the French king Philip IV. Following an unfair trial in 1308 at the behest of Pope Clement V, whose personal goals came into conflict with the Templars, the order was suspended.

In 1310, fifty-four Templar knights were burned at the stake. Four years later, the final Grand Master, Jacques de Molay and a local leader and several companions were burned at the stake as well. It was officially disbanded in 1312 by Pope Clement V. Following their dissolution, some of the Templars moved to Portugal, where they founded the Military Order of Christ. Though they survived outside of Europe in this way for some decades, by the early 15th century they were completely defunct. The Templars had been well known and prominent to that point, so their sudden disappearance resulted in many legends and fantastical stories. There grew various theories about the Templars themselves having had a secret, initiatory circle within it, which the official Templars were only the outside shell of. This theory is disputed by historians, though they do not dispute that some esoteric elements may have been involved in the order.

== History ==
=== Freemasonic rites ===
In the 18th century, a notion of the Templars secretly continuing their existence and activities began to spread, particularly within Freemasonry in France and Germany. This idea was based on previous legends of the Templars embedding themselves in Freemason guilds to continue their activities; this idea led to the creation of several Templar grades in Freemason organizations. This was particularly prominent within Illuminist freemasonry, which was unrelated to the Templars. Out of such was formed the masonic rites of the Strict Templar Observance created by Baron Karl von Hund, which Jean-Baptiste Willermoz turned into the Rectified Scottish Rite; through this change it gave up the claimed connection to the Templars.

=== 19th-century revival ===
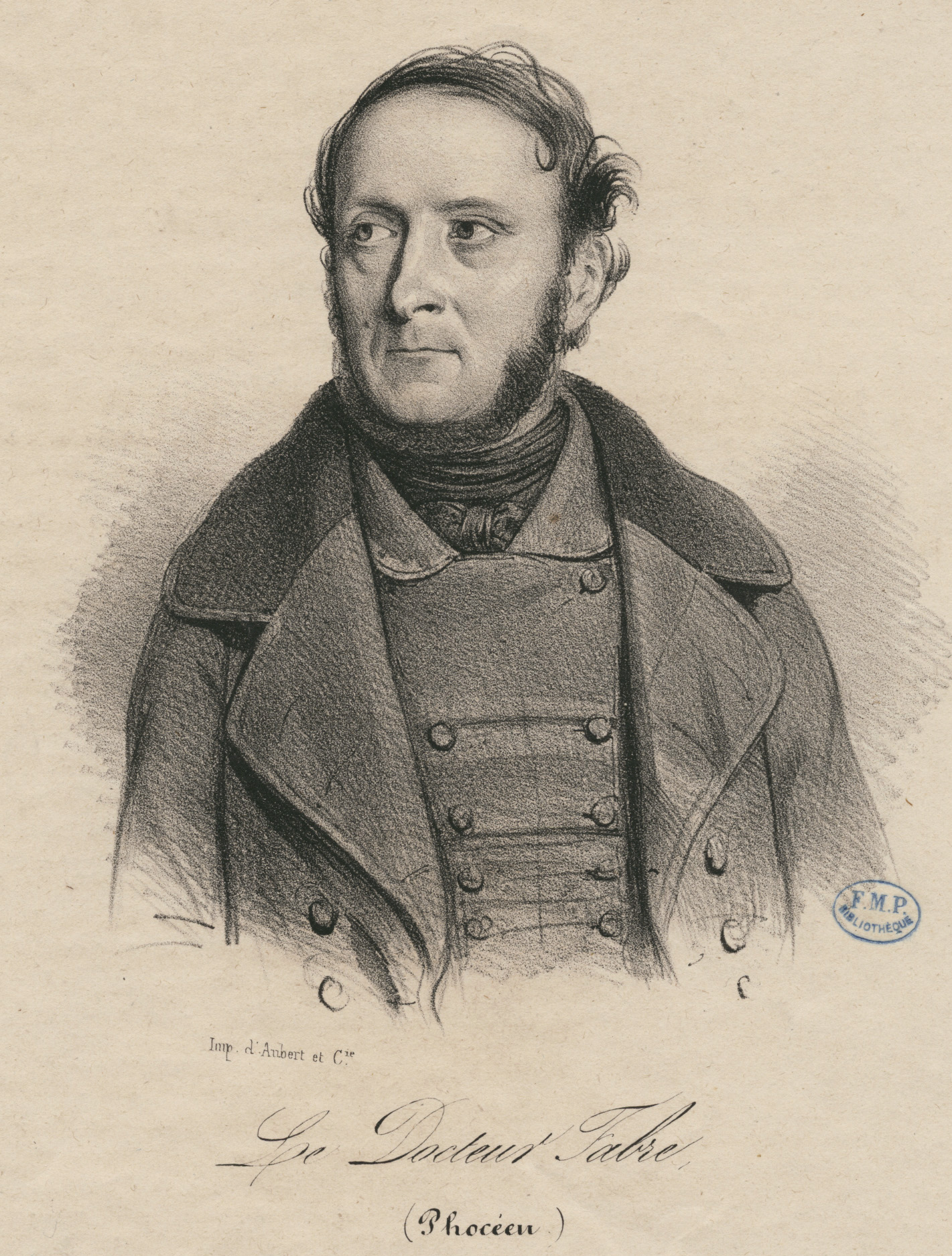
Bernard-Raymond Fabré-Palaprat, widely regarded as the father of neo-Templarism.

The French Revolutionary period was a period of upheaval for Freemasons; some at the time disagreed with the idea of these Templar grades as being only a part of freemasonry, subservient to the masonic order. Most neo-Templar groups' origins can be traced to a revivalist Order of the Temple founded by Bernard-Raymond Fabré-Palaprat, a physician and former seminarian from Paris. Fabré-Palaprat is widely regarded as the father of neo-Templarism. In 1804, he claimed that he had discovered documents that proved there was an uninterrupted line of secret "Grand Master" Templars from the supposed dissolution to the modern day. This document, the Larmenius Charter, displayed the signatures of all the supposed grand masters since the dissolution of the Templars. Modern scholars have concluded that the document is a forgery.

Fabré-Palaprat proclaimed himself the Grand Master of the Templars in 1805, reestablishing the Templars independent from Freemasonry. This new movement attracted various people, including Napoleon, who approved an 1808 ceremony. As the Catholic Church, having disbanded the Templars, was opposed to their reconstitution, it was at least officially opposed to any revival moments; in response, Fabré-Palaprat declared Catholicism a "fallen church" and founded the Johannite Church. Fabré-Palaprat linked the neo-Templars to his new Christian denomination. The Johannite Church consecreated several bishops, resulting in an association of neo-Templarism with Liberal Catholic "irregular bishops" as well. Fabré-Palaprat died in 1838, resulting in a schism between the Johannite Church of Ferdinand-François Châtel and the Templar Order, run by William Sydney Smith and Count Jules de Moreton, respectively. These two groups reconciled three years later, with Jean-Marie Raoul as leader; however, the concept of the Templar order became less fashionable, and a successive leader, A.M. Vernois, ceased the group's activity in 1871.

Later, the "regency" of the Temple Order was said to have passed on to Joséphin Péladan by remaining members of the order; however, this is disputed and has little evidence or testimony supporting it. Péladan was more interested in a separate order he had founded, the Order of the Catholic Rose-Croix of the Temple and the Grail, and mixed Templar elements with Rosicrucianism. The Temple Order later became amalgamated among other occult groups headed by doctor Papus and Péladan, one of which, the Independent Group of Esoteric Studies, carried on some of its legacy. This occurred in a revivalist period for occultism at the end of the 19th century, and Templar symbolism became popular and prominent in many occult movements, though many of these were not strictly neo-Templar and also incorporated other elements and symbols, as well as a different worldview from that originally had by Fabré-Palaprat. This era had many esoteric and occult elements blending with each other, with neo-Templar elements combining with Martinist, neo-Pythagorean, or Rosicrucian traditions; many groups had the same leaders.

At the end of the 19th century, groups incorporating such elements were founded, including the Ordo Templi Orientis (O.T.O.) founded by industrialist and mystic Carl Kellner and the racist and pan-Germanic Order of the New Templars (Latin: Ordo Novi Templi, ONT) founded by Jörg Lanz von Liebenfels, which later had an influence on Nazism. The most direct descendant of Fabré-Palaprat's Templar order was in the Belgian branch, KVMRIS, the only one which had stayed active; KVMRIS was especially interested in sex magic. In 1894, this Belgian branch encouraged the formation of the International Secretariat of Templars in Brussels.

=== 20th century and successors ===
The Rosicrucian organization AMORC, founded in 1915, also has some neo-Templar elements; while predominantly Rosicrucian, its founder Harvey Spencer Lewis having a particular interest in the 18th century revivalist order of Bernard-Raymond Fabré-Palaprat and the Knights Templar and with later degrees having neo-Templar aspects. Lewis had had some contact with neo-Templar figures and related European occultists.

KVMRIS, surviving into the 1930s, eventually incorporated in 1932 as the Sovereign and Military Order of the Temple (French: Ordre souverain et militaire du Temple) under the regency of Théodore Covias (there were too few members to have a Grand Master), succeeded by Emile-Clément Vandenberg who was elected three years later. The Order's archives were given to Antonio Campello Pinto de Sousa Fontes in 1942 during WWII in Portugal; shortly after, he proclaimed himself the Grand Master, resulting in neo-Templarism spreading internationally.

In 1945, Fontes changed the name to Ordre souverain et militaire du Temple de Jérusalem, OSMTJ. He designated his son Fernando Campello Pinto de Sousa Fontes as his successor, but as several other independent branches refused to recognize Antonio's authority, when he died several groups instead declared their independence. In a 1970 Paris meeting, several Grand Priorates, all who rejected Antonio's rule, instead appointed Antoine Zdrojewski as the grand master. This resulted in two separate primary neo-Templar international groups: the group that recognized Sousa Fontes, the Ordo Supremus Militari Templi Hierosolymitani (OSMTH), and the group that recognized Zdrojewski, the OSMTJ. The OSMTH sometimes uses the French name and acronym of OSMTJ.

Neo-Templar organizations were active in France and Switzerland in the nineteenth and twentieth centuries. During this period, political conservatives and fascists used these ideas and lodges to appeal to an "old order" and an idea of a master race (through ideals of aristocracy common to the groups).

=== Arginy Renaissance ===
A second branch of neo-Templarism, independent from prior groups, was created by French esotericist and author Jacques Breyer. Following what he claimed was a mystical experience in the Castle of Arginy in 1952, Breyer met the occultist Maxime de Roquemaure, who claimed that he was part of a branch of an order that descended directly from the original Templars, which had secretly survived in Ethiopia. This began a rebirth of activity of neo-Templar groups in France (the 'Arginy Renaissance').

Together they founded the Sovereign Order of the Solar Temple, which was officially established 24 June 1966 but was active for some years before that. Breyer claimed that he had founded the OSTS at the suggestion of the "Masters of the Temple", who he said were the spirits of the Knights Templar. Breyer would become greatly influential on subsequent and contemporary neo-Templar groups and was viewed as a spiritual mentor by many in them. Founding members of the OSTS were involved in the founding the National Grand Lodge of France Opéra. Many of the OSTS's ideas were explicitly apocalyptic and involved the idea of the end of the world and the return of the "Solar Christ". Breyer resigned in 1964, resulting in a crisis, but the group reformed in 1966 and 1973.

In 1970, legate of AMORC Raymond Bernard founded the Renewed Order of the Temple (ORT) at the suggestion of Julien Origas. Bernard quickly let Origas take control, after which it was led solely by Origas. Origas was also known to have a "difficult" personality, which led to several schisms within the order which formed several other organizations. Jean-Louis Marsan later became the grand master of the OSTS; Marsan and Origas were both affiliated with Breyer's revival movement. In 1981, OSTS and ORT attempted to merge, but Origas died in 1983. After his death ORT split in two, one of which was the Order of the Solar Temple (OTS).

=== Late 20th century to 21st century ===
Zdrojewski became embroiled in a number of political controversies, and Sousa Fontes failed to control all of his authorized priorates; this resulted in more organizations arising, and several independent priorates emerging besides the two main ones. Federations of these groups were formed, including the International Federative Alliance (IFA), created in 1989, and the Ordo Internationalis Militiae Templi Confederationis (OIMT), created in Rome, Italy in 1979. As of 1980, there were over 100 rival Templar orders, which incorporated a variety of different practices.

In the mid to late 90s, many groups tried to "reduce the number of acronyms" and reconcile the differences between the many groups, including the split between OSMTJ and OSMTH. These reconciliation attempts failed for a variety of reasons and new schisms emerged in the meantime, though there did come the success of one agreement between OSMTJ and OIMT, which aimed to create a real association; the OSMTJ was also merged with the IFA in Turku, Finland in 1998. These schisms were additionally influenced by the desire of many neo-Templar groups to distance themselves from the Order of the Solar Temple, which became notorious in the 1990s for several mass suicides and murders. The leader and founder of the group, Joseph Di Mambro, was a member of many other neo-Templar groups, including the OSMTJ, and the OTS had been founded out of some of the members of AMORC and ORT, moving in many of the same circles as Origas and Breyer.

Norwegian far-right terrorist Anders Behring Breivik, the perpetrator of the 2011 Norway attacks who murdered 77 people, was a neo-Templar, though his form of it was noted to not "resemble in any substantial way the countless neo-Templar esoteric orders that have formed out of esoteric currents over the last couple of centuries". He claimed that he was a member of a trans-European neo-Templar brotherhood; this group was imaginary and by all accounts did not actually exist. Various far-right and nationalist groups also appropriate Templar symbolism.

== Beliefs ==
Neo-Templar groups are extremely diverse, with a variety of beliefs and spiritual aspects. They are usually chivalric orders, which claim variously to descend from, have revived, or adapted the original Knights Templars. Neo-Templar themes, myths and symbols have influenced and been influenced by many other esoteric movements. Other orders draw from Freemasonry. Many are secret and require initiation through ritual. Other orders incorporate ideas from the New Age movement, or are merely ceremonial organizations only in existence for social and chivalric purposes, or to grant titles in exchange for money for status purposes. Some exist to promote arcane and extremist magical-esoteric concepts and agendas, many of which are related to the Ascended Master teachings, as well as belief in aliens.

The truth of a historical continuation between these groups and the original Templars as claimed by some is extremely dubious. The idea of the Templars' continued existence has been criticized by scholars of Templar history, and was described by French medievalist and historian Régine Pernoud as "totally insane." Masonic groups latched on to the idea of having heritage of the Knights Templars as a way to back up the idea of an ancient heritage. Other neo-Templar groups, typically "revived" ones that do not claim descent, are averse to identification with other more esoteric orders, given their association with perceived cultish and fringe organizations. These are typically Christian and desire to emulate the perceived Christ-like aspects of the original Knights Templars, through promoting chivalric Christian values and participating in charity work.

== List of neo-Templar organizations ==
Name	Acronym	Founder	Founded	Country	Status	Notes	Ref.
Order of the Temple	N/A	Bernard-Raymond Fabré-Palaprat	1805	FR	Defunct	French: Ordre du Temple. Original Templar revivalist movement	
Ordo Templi Orientis	O.T.O.	Carl Kellner	1895	DE	Extant	Occultist organization and secret society. Popularized by Aleister Crowley	
Order of the New Templars	ONT	Jörg Lanz von Liebenfels	1907	DE	Defunct	Latin: Ordo Novi Templi. Fascist secret society founded in Germany; related to the racist esoteric philosophy Ariosophy. Later had an influence on Nazism	
Order of the Renewed Temple	N/A	René Guénon	1908	FR	Defunct	Templar revival movement founded in Guénon's youth	
AMORC	AMORC	Harvey Spencer Lewis	1915	US	Extant	Rosicrucian organization, later degrees incorporate neo-Templar elements	
Sovereign Military Order of the Temple of Jerusalem	OSMTJ	Théodore Covias	1932	BEL	Extant	French: Ordre Souverain et Militaire du Temple de Jerusalem. Descendant group of the Belgian branch, KVMRIS, of Fabré-Palaprat's Order of the Temple	
Croix Blanche Universelle	N/A	André Karquel	1945	FR	Defunct		
Ordre des Chevaliers de France	OCF	Georges Lusseaud	1953	FR	Extant	Religious order	
Ordre d'Alibert	N/A	Alibert de Brandicourt	1957	FR	Extant	Chivalric order; admits those of any faith	
Nouvel Observance Templière	NOT	Unknown	1963	FR	Extant	AKA Order of the Rose or French: Ordre de la Rose	
Sovereign Order of the Solar Temple	OSTS	Jacques Breyer; Maxime de Roquemaure	1966	FR	Defunct	French: Ordre souverain du Temple solaire	
Ordo Supremus Militari Templi Hierosolymitani	OSMTH	Fernando Campello Pinto de Sousa Fontes	1970	FR	Extant	Schismed from OSMTJ, sometimes also uses the name and acronym of OSMTJ	
Association française des Chevaliers du Christ	N/A	Unknown	1970	FR	Extant	Also the Observantis Militium Christis. Connected to the Vatican	
Renewed Order of the Temple	ORT	Raymond Bernard	1970	FR	Defunct	French: Ordre rénové du Temple. Schismed upon Origas's death, one of which became the OTS	
Sovereign Order of the Initiatic Temple	OSTI	Raymond Bernard	1971	FR	Extant	French: Ordre souverain du Temple initiatique. Was dormant until 1988, when it was revived.	
Ordre des veilleurs du Temple	OVDT	Lucien M.	1973	FR	Extant	lit. 'Order of the Watchers of the Temple'. Schism from ORT Also called Militia Templi	
Grand Prieuré de Suise	N/A	Alfred Zappelli	1973	CH	Extant	Subgroup of OSMTJ	
Resurrected Order of the Temple	OTR	Michel Carpenet	1974	FR	Defunct	French: Ordre du Temple ressuscité. Also known as the Order of the Knights of the Holy Temple (French: Ordre des Chevaliers du Saint-Temple).	
Cercle du Temple et du Saint-Graal	CTSG	Noël R.; Jean-Marie Parent	1975	FR	Defunct	lit. 'Circle of the Temple and the Holy Grail'. Schism from ORT, after both founders were kicked out	
Grand Prieuré d'Égypte	N/A	Unknown	1977	FR	Extant		
Fraternité johannite pour la résurgence templière	FJRT	Jean-Marie Parent and seven others	1978	FR	Defunct	lit. 'Johannite Brotherhood for the Templar Resurgence'. Schism from the CTSG	
Ordre du Temple cosmique	OTC	"Jean"	1978	FR	Extant	lit. 'Order of the Cosmic Temple'. Schism from OSTS	
Ordo Internationalis Militiae Templi	OIMT	Unknown	1979	International	Extant	Federation of neo-Templars, founded in Rome	
Ordre équestre et hospitalier de Chypre	N/A	Unknown	1979	FR	Extant	Also Ordre Templier de Chypre. Focuses on philanthropy and charity	
Order of the Solar Temple	OTS	Joseph Di Mambro; Luc Jouret	1984	CH	Defunct	French: Ordre du Temple solaire. Schism from ORT (Origas). Formerly the ORT–Solar Tradition or International Order of Chivalry Solar Tradition (OICST or OICTS). Notorious for the mass murder-suicides committed by its members in the mid to late 1990s.	
Ordre des chevaliers du Temple du Christ et de Notre Dame	OCTCND	Jean-Marie Parent	1984	FR	Extant	Related to the Ordre du Beauceant	
International Center for Cultural and Spiritual Research	CIRCES	Raymond Bernard	1988	International	Extant	French: Centre international de recherches et d'études spirituelles. Merged into OSTI in 1993	
International Federative Alliance	IFA	Unknown	1989	International	Defunct	Federation of neo-Templars. Later merged with the OSMTJ in 1998	
Ordo Militiae Crucis Templi	OMCT	Unknown	Unknown	DE	Extant	Christian organization	
Centre culturel de la Commanderie des Templiers de la Villedieu	N/A	Unknown	Unknown	FR	Extant		
Chevaliers de l'Alliance templière	N/A	Unknown	Unknown	FR	Extant	Connected to the Ordre des veilleurs du Temple	
Collège Templier	N/A	Unknown	Unknown	FR	Extant	Or Helios College Templier. Part of the Arginy movement	
Ordre internationale des Bons Templiers	N/A	Unknown	Unknown	FR	Extant		
Templiers de Chypre	N/A	Unknown	Unknown	FR	Extant	Claims descent from the Templars through Knights who were said to have escaped to Scotland. Incorporates Rosicrucian ideas	
Ordre de la Massenie du Saint-Graal	N/A	Unknown	Unknown	FR	Extant	Combines Templarism with Holy Grail ideas	
Order of the Poor Knights of Christ of the Temple of Solomon	N/A	Gregorio Baccolini	Unknown	ITA	Extant	French: Ordre des Pauvres chevaliers du Christ et du Temple de Salomon	
