= Mary T. Ficalora =

American author and TV producer (born 1950)

- Born: April 13, 1960 (age 66); San Jose, California
- Education: Arizona State University
- Occupation: Author
- Website: www.availpress.com

Mary T. Ficalora is an American author, educator, event coordinator, and television producer.

== Background ==
Ficalora was born in San Jose, California on April 13, 1960. Being the daughter of an IBM engineer, she spent her childhood of the late 60s and early 70s in South America and Italy. As of 2013, she is producing and coordinating continuing education courses for psychologists, as well as substitute teaching in Los Angeles.

Her education includes attending school in Milan, Italy, Montevideo, Uruguay, London, and Stamford, Connecticut. She attended Marymount College and Gonzaga University before graduating from Arizona State University.

Ficalora received a producing fellow certificate from the American Film Institute Center for Advanced Film and Television Production. In 2011, she also earned an Education Specialist credential from California State University, Northridge.

== Career ==
Ficalora began her career in film and television production. Ficalora worked for several years at KAET-TV in Phoenix, Arizona and KXLY-TV in Spokane, Washington. She received a Seattle Emmy nomination in 1986 for producing and directing The KXLY Video Rock-Off. She also was the assistant to the producer and post-production coordinator for a Disney program in the late 80's, Backstage at the Zoo.

She studied Gnostic Kabbalah with Stephan Hoellar at the Philosophical Research Society in Los Angeles and is a former daily contributor to Allvoices writing about tarot and related topics. This column has been continued and incorporated into her personal blog, Choosing Honor.

== Book ==
Ficalora has written a social issues book, Choosing Honor: An American Woman’s Search for God, Family, and Country in an Age of Corruption. It was a finalist for USA Book News "Best Books 2009" award.

== Bibliography ==
- Ficalora, Mary T. (2008). Choosing Honor: An American Woman's Search for God, Family, and Country in an Age of Corruption. Calabasas, CA: Avail Press. pp. 179 pages. ISBN 978-0979935909.
