= Gnosticism in modern times =

Contemporary religious movement

Gnosticism in modern times, commonly known as neo-Gnosticism, includes a variety of contemporary religious movements, stemming from Gnostic ideas and systems from ancient Roman society. The root word, gnosis, means knowledge, originating in Jewish and Christian social environments in the first and second century A.D.

The Mandaeans are an ancient Gnostic ethnoreligious group that have survived and are found today in Iran, Iraq and diaspora communities in North America, Western Europe and Australia.

The late 19th century saw the publication of popular sympathetic studies making use of recently rediscovered source materials. In this period there was also the revival of a Gnostic religious movement in France. The emergence of the Nag Hammadi library in 1945 greatly increased the amount of source material available. Its translation from Coptic into English and other modern languages in 1977 resulted in a wide dissemination, which had observable influence on several modern figures and upon modern Western culture in general. This article attempts to summarize those modern figures and movements that have been influenced by Gnosticism, both prior and subsequent to the Nag Hammadi discovery.

A number of ecclesiastical bodies that identify as Gnostic have set up or re-founded since World War II as well, including the Ecclesia Gnostica, Johannite Church, Ecclesia Gnostica Catholica, the Ecclesia Gnostica Mysterioum, the Thomasine Church, the Alexandrian Gnostic Church, the Ecclesia Gnostica Apostolica Catholica, the Gnostic Catholic Union, Ecclesia Valentinaris Antiqua, the Cathari Church of Wales, and the North American College of Gnostic Bishops.

== Late 19th century ==
Source materials were discovered in the 18th century. In 1769, the Bruce Codex was brought to England from Upper Egypt by the Scottish traveller James Bruce, and subsequently bequeathed to the care of the Bodleian Library, Oxford. Sometime prior to 1785, the Askew Codex (a.k.a. Pistis Sophia) was bought by the British Museum from the heirs of Dr. Anthony Askew. The Pistis Sophia text and a Latin translation of the Askew Codex by Moritz G. Schwartze were published in 1851. Although discovered in 1896, the Coptic Berlin Codex (a.k.a. the Akhmim Codex) was not 'rediscovered' until the 20th century.

=== Charles William King ===
Charles William King was a British writer and collector of ancient gemstones with magical inscriptions. His collection was sold because of his failing eyesight, and was presented in 1881 to the Metropolitan Museum of Art, New York. King was recognized as one of the greatest authorities on gems at the time.

In The Gnostics and their Remains (1864, 1887 2nd ed.) King sets out to show that rather than being a Western heresy, the origins of Gnosticism are to be found in the East, specifically in Buddhism. This theory was embraced by Helena Blavatsky, who argued that it was plausible, but rejected by G. R. S. Mead. According to Mead, King's work "lacks the thoroughness of the specialist."

=== Madame Blavatsky ===
Helena Petrovna Blavatsky, co-founder of the Theosophical Society, wrote extensively on Gnostic ideas. A compilation of her writings on Gnosticism is over 270 pages long. The first edition of King's The Gnostics and Their Remains was repeatedly cited as a source and quoted in Isis Unveiled.

=== G. R. S. Mead ===
G. R. S. Mead became a member of Blavatsky's Theosophical Society in 1884. He left the teaching profession in 1889 to become Blavatsky's private secretary, which he was until her death in 1891. Mead's interest in Gnosticism was likely awakened by Blavatsky, who discussed it at length in Isis Unveiled.

In 1890–1891 Mead published a serial article on Pistis Sophia in Lucifer magazine, the first English translation of that work. In an article in 1891, Mead argues for the recovery of the literature and thought of the West at a time when Theosophy was largely directed to the East, saying that this recovery of Western antique traditions is a work of interpretation and "the rendering of tardy justice to pagans and heretics, the reviled and rejected pioneers of progress..." This was the direction his own work was to take.

The first edition of his translation of Pistis Sophia appeared in 1896. From 1896 to 1898 Mead published another serial article in the same periodical, "Among the Gnostics of the First Two Centuries", that laid the foundation for his compendium Fragments of a Faith Forgotten in 1900. Mead serially published translations from the Corpus Hermeticum from 1900 to 1905. The next year he published Thrice-Greatest Hermes, a comprehensive three-volume treatise. His series Echoes of the Gnosis was published in 12 booklets in 1908. By the time he left the Theosophical Society in 1909, he had published many influential translations, commentaries, and studies of ancient Gnostic texts. "Mead made Gnosticism accessible to the intelligent public outside of academia." Mead's work has had and continues to have widespread influence.

=== Gnostic Church revival in France ===
After a series of visions and archival finds of Cathar-related documents, a librarian named Jules-Benoît Stanislas Doinel du Val-Michel (a.k.a. Jules Doinel) established the Église Gnostique (French: Gnostic Church). Founded on extant Cathar documents with the Gospel of John and strong influence of Simonian and Valentinian cosmology, the church was officially established in the autumn of 1890 in Paris. Doinel declared it "the era of Gnosis restored." Liturgical services were based on Cathar rituals. Clergy was both male and female, having male bishops and female "sophias."

Doinel resigned and converted to Roman Catholicism in 1895, one of many duped by Léo Taxil's anti-masonic hoax. Taxil unveiled the hoax in 1897. Doinel was readmitted to the Gnostic church as a bishop in 1900.

== Early to mid-20th century ==
=== Carl Jung ===
Carl Gustav Jung evinced a special interest in Gnosticism from at latest 1912, when he wrote enthusiastically about the topic in a letter to his mentor Sigmund Freud. After what he called his own 'encounter with the unconscious,' Jung sought for external evidence of this kind of experience. He found such evidence in Gnosticism and also in alchemy, which he saw as a continuation of Gnostic thought, and of which more source material was available. In his study of the Gnostics, Jung made extensive use of the work of G. R. S. Mead (see above). Jung visited Mead in London to thank him for the Pistis Sophia, the two corresponded, and Mead visited Jung in Zürich.

Jung saw the Gnostics not as syncretic schools of mixed theological doctrines, but as genuine visionaries, and saw their imagery not as myths but as records of inner experience. He wrote that "The explanation of Gnostic ideas 'in terms of themselves,' i.e., in terms of their historical foundations, is futile, for in that way they are reduced only to their less developed forestages but not understood in their actual significance." Instead, he worked to understand and explain Gnosticism from a psychological standpoint. While providing something of an ancient mirror of his work, Jung saw "his psychology not as a contemporary version of Gnosticism, but as a contemporary counterpart to it."

Jung reported a series of experiences in the winter of 1916-17 that inspired him to write Septem Sermones ad Mortuos (Latin: Seven Sermons to the Dead).

==== The Jung Codex ====
Through the efforts of Gilles Quispel, the Jung Codex was the first codex brought to light from the Nag Hammadi Library. It was purchased by the Jung Institute and ceremonially presented to Jung in 1953 because of his great interest in the ancient Gnostics. The first publication of translations of Nag Hammadi texts occurred in 1955 with The Jung Codex by Henri-Charles Puech, Gilles Quispel, and Willem Cornelis Van Unnik.

=== Gnostic Church of France split, reintegration, and continuation ===
Jean Bricaud had been involved with the Eliate Church of Carmel of Eugène Vintras, the remnants of Fabré-Palaprat's Église Johannite des Chrétiens Primitifs (Johannite Church of Primitive Christians), and the Martinist Order before being consecrated a bishop of the Église Gnostique in 1901. In 1907 Bricaud established a church body that combined all of these, becoming patriarch under the name Tau Jean II. The impetus for this was to use the Western Rite. Briefly called the Église Catholique Gnostique (Gnostic Catholic Church), it was renamed the Église Gnostique Universelle (Universal Gnostic Church, EGU) in 1908. The close ties between the church and Martinism were formalized in 1911. Bricaud received consecration in the Villate line of apostolic succession in 1919.

The original church body founded by Doinel continued under the name Église Gnostique de France (Gnostic Church of France) until it was disbanded in favor of the EGU in 1926. The EGU continued until 1960 when it was disbanded by Robert Amberlain (Tau Jean III) in favor of the Église Gnostique Apostolique that he had founded in 1958. It is active in France (including Martinique), Ivory Coast, and the Midwestern United States.

=== Modern sex magic associated with Gnosticism ===
The association of the term gnostic with sexual magic is a modern phenomenon, emerging primarily in the context of 19th- and 20th-century esoteric revival movements. As religious studies scholar Hugh Urban observes, "despite the very common use of sexual symbolism throughout Gnostic texts, there is little evidence (apart from the accusations of the early church) that the Gnostics engaged in any actual performance of sexual rituals, and certainly not anything resembling modern sexual magic."

Modern sexual magic as a practice is largely traced to Paschal Beverly Randolph (1825–1875), an American occultist who synthesized Spiritualism, mesmerism, and erotic mysticism into a system of ritual sex magic that emphasized love, will, and transcendence. The connection to Gnosticism came later, primarily through the Gnostic Church of France (Église Gnostique de France), which was deeply embedded in the esoteric networks of late 19th-century France. These networks also produced or influenced other occult organizations, including Ordo Templi Orientis (O.T.O.), the most prominent sexual magic order of the 20th century.

Theodor Reuss, the founder of O.T.O., envisioned it as an umbrella organization for esoteric and initiatory societies, with sexual magic at its core. After encountering leaders of the Gnostic Church of France at a Masonic and Spiritualist conference in 1908, Reuss founded Die Gnostische Katholische Kirche (the Gnostic Catholic Church) as an ecclesiastical body under the auspices of O.T.O. Reuss would later dedicate O.T.O. to the dissemination of Aleister Crowley's philosophy of Thelema, making Crowley its most prominent figurehead.

For this purpose, Crowley composed the Ecclesiæ Gnosticæ Catholicæ Canon Missæ—commonly known as the Gnostic Mass—which became the central public ritual of Ecclesia Gnostica Catholica (EGC), the liturgical wing of O.T.O. Although Crowley borrowed terminology and symbolic structure from Gnostic and Christian liturgy, the ritual is fundamentally Thelemic in theology and intent, emphasizing the union of opposites, the sanctity of the body, and the realization of the divine self.

=== The Gnostic Society ===
The Gnostic Society was founded for the study of Gnosticism in 1928 and incorporated in 1939 by Theosophists James Morgan Pryse and his brother John Pryse in Los Angeles. Since 1963 it has been under the direction of Stephan Hoeller and operates in association with the Ecclesia Gnostica. Initially begun as an archive for a usenet newsgroup in 1993, the Gnosis Archive became the first web site to offer historic and source materials on Gnosticism.

== Mid-20th century ==
=== Ecclesia Gnostica ===
Established in 1953 by Richard Duc de Palatine in England under the name 'the Pre-nicene Gnostic Catholic Church', the Ecclesia Gnostica (Latin: "Church of Gnosis" or "Gnostic Church") is said to represent 'the English Gnostic tradition', although it has ties to, and has been influenced by, the French Gnostic church tradition. It is affiliated with the Gnostic Society, an organization dedicated to the study of Gnosticism. The presiding bishop is the Rt. Rev. Stephan A. Hoeller, who has written extensively on Gnosticism.

Centered in Los Angeles, the Ecclesia Gnostica has parishes and educational programs of the Gnostic Society spanning the Western United States and also in the Kingdom of Norway. The lectionary and liturgical calendar of the Ecclesia Gnostica have been widely adopted by subsequent Gnostic churches, as have the liturgical services in use by the church, though in somewhat modified forms.

==== Ecclesia Gnostica Mysteriorum ====
The Ecclesia Gnostica Mysteriorum (EGM), commonly known as "the Church of Gnosis" or "the Gnostic Sanctuary," was initially established in Palo Alto, California by bishop Rosamonde Miller as a parish of the Ecclesia Gnostica, but soon became an independent body with emphasis on the experience of gnosis and the balance of the divine masculine and feminine principles. The Gnostic Sanctuary is now located in Redwood City, California. The EGM also claims a distinct lineage of Mary Magdalene from a surviving tradition in France.

=== Samael Aun Weor ===
Samael Aun Weor (1917 – 1977) was a teacher and author of over sixty books of esoteric spirituality. He formed a new religious movement under the banner of "Universal Gnosticism", or simply gnosis, and taught the practical and esoteric principles to awaken and fundamentally change the psychological condition.

He first made a name in the Gnosticism of his native country of Colombia, before moving to Mexico in 1956, where he founded the Movimiento Gnostico Cristiano Universal (MGCU) (Universal Gnostic Christian Movement), then subsequently founded the Iglesia Gnostica Cristiana Universal (Universal Gnostic Christian Church) and the Associacion Gnostica de Estudios Antropologicos Culturales y Cientificos (AGEAC) (Gnostic Association of Scientific, Cultural and Anthropological Studies) to spread his teachings. His works became popular among practitioners of occultism and Western esotericism and were translated into other languages.

The MGCU became defunct by the time of Samael Aun Weor's death in December 1977. His disciples formed new organizations to spread his teachings under the umbrella term 'the International Gnostic Movement'. These organizations have been active via the Internet and have had centers established in Latin America, the United States, Australia, Canada, and Europe.

=== Hans Jonas ===
The philosopher Hans Jonas (1903 – 1993) wrote extensively on Gnosticism, interpreting it from an existentialist viewpoint. For some time, his study The Gnostic Religion: The Message of the Alien God and the Beginnings of Christianity published in 1958, was widely held to be a pivotal work, and it is as a result of his efforts that the Syrian–Egyptian/Persian division of Gnosticism came to be widely used within the field. The second edition, published in 1963, included the essay "Gnosticism, Existentialism, and Nihilism," where Jonas claimed that attitude previously manifest as ancient Gnosticism was transformed into Nihilism (largely identified as Nazism) by the secular atheist approach typical of Sartre and Heidegger.

=== Eric Voegelin's gnosticism thesis ===
In the 1950s, Eric Voegelin (1901 – 1985) brought a German academic debate concerning the classification of modernity to the attention of English-language readers. He responded to Jacob Taubes's 1947 Occidental Eschatology and Karl Löwith's 1949 Meaning in History: the Theological Implications of the Philosophy of History in his 1959 book Wissenschaft, Politik und Gnosis.

Voegelin advanced what has become known as the gnosticism thesis, critiquing modernity by identifying immanentist eschatology—the belief in the realization of ultimate salvation within history—as a gnostic character of modern political ideologies. Unlike Löwith, Voegelin did not reject eschatology itself but instead focused on the immanentization of eschatological hope, which he described as a pneumopathological deformation of spiritual experience. Voegelin's interpretation of gnosticism gained significant traction in American neoconservative and Cold War political thought. The concept has since been adopted by other scholars to analyze various revolutionary movements, including Bolshevism, Nazism, Puritanism, radical Anabaptism, Jacobinism, and, more recently, Salafi jihadism.

Because Voegelin applied the concept of gnosis to a wide array of ideologies and movements, critics have proposed that Voegelin's concept of Gnosis lacks theoretical precision. Therefore, according to these critics, Voegelin's gnosis can hardly serve as a scientific basis for an analysis of political movements. Rather, they say, the term "Gnosticism" as used by Voegelin is more of an invective just as "when on the lowest level of propaganda those who do not conform with one's own opinion are smeared as communists."

=== Gershom Scholem's Kabbalah as Jewish Gnosticism ===
Gershom Scholem (1897 – 1982), was an Israeli philosopher and historian. Widely regarded as the founder of modern academic study of the Kabbalah, Scholem proposed that elements of 13th-century Kabbalah—particularly in texts such as the Zohar—were rooted in an earlier form of Jewish gnosticism that predated and perhaps influenced Christian gnostic movements. In works like Jewish Gnosticism, Merkabah Mysticism, and the Talmudic Tradition (1965) and Origins of the Kabbalah (1987), he traced thematic parallels between Gnostic and Kabbalistic cosmology, including notions of divine emanation, spiritual exile, and the soul's ascent through hostile realms. His thesis contributed to a broader reappraisal of Gnosticism in modern intellectual history, positioning it as a subversive and creative force within both Jewish and Western esoteric traditions.

However, Scholem's thesis has not gone unchallenged. Later scholars such as Moshe Idel critiqued Scholem for overemphasizing external influences—particularly from Gnostic and Neoplatonic systems—at the expense of internal Jewish developments. In Kabbalah: New Perspectives (1988), Idel argued for a more nuanced view of Kabbalah's evolution, grounded in rabbinic, liturgical, and experiential traditions rather than speculative parallels with Gnosticism. While Scholem's thesis remains a landmark in the academic study of mysticism, it is no longer a dominant view, and the relationship between Gnosticism and Kabbalah is now approached with greater methodological caution.

== Late 20th century and 21st century ==
=== Neo-Gnostic movement in Finland ===
Pekka Siitoin founded the Turku Society for the Spiritual Sciences (Turun Hengentieteen Seura) on September 1, 1971. Siitoin believed in neo-Gnosticism and Theosophy and combined these with antisemitism and satanism. To him, Lucifer, Satan and Jesus were subordinate to the Monad, and could be worshiped together. Lucifer was a Promethean figure who created the original humanity and granted them wisdom so that they would evolve to be equal to Gods in time, while Jehova–Demiurge created the Jewish race to usurp Lucifer's power and lord over humanity. Siitoin was also influenced by Christian apocrypha and to him Jesus was an agent of the Monad and Lucifer against the Demiurge.

=== Dilexit nos ===
Pope Francis suggested that a modern form of Jansenist rigour which he has criticised in his encyclical letter Dilexit nos can be seen as "a recrudescence of that Gnosticism which proved so great a spiritual threat in the early centuries of Christianity because it refused to acknowledge the reality of 'the salvation of the flesh'." The aim of his letter, which focuses on "the heart of Jesus Christ", is to avoid the danger of withdrawal to a "disambodied spirituality" which treats matter as evil.

=== Coastal Gnostic Church ===
The Coastal Gnostic Church is a group within the Alawism sect that views the origins of the Alawites as Gnostic and seeks to reclaim this Gnostic identity.

== In popular culture ==
Gnosticism has seen something of a resurgence in popular culture in the late 20th and early 21st centuries, following the emergence of the Nag Hammadi library. Catholic priest Alfonso Aguilar has described Star Wars (1977), Harry Potter (1997), and The Matrix (1999) as embodying Gnostic views, as "two signs of the power of the real enemy: Gnosticism" and stressing the need to "examine their philosophical background and reject what is incompatible with our Christian faith."

- Philip K. Dick explored gnosticism in many of his later works, particularly the VALIS trilogy (1978–1982).
- The Flight to Lucifer: A Gnostic Fantasy (1980), a novel by Harold Bloom, explicitly aimed to introduce readers to Gnosticism.
- Blood Meridian (1985) by American writer Cormac McCarthy features several Gnostic elements.
- Polish Nobel laureate Olga Tokarczuk depicts worlds that strongly resemble one known from the Gnostic cosmogony. Notable examples are Primeval and Other Times (1996) and House of Day, House of Night (1998).
- In The Matrix (1999), Morpheus offering Neo the truth and asking him to choose between a blue or red pill symbolizing materialistic relativism and secret knowledge respectively, which has been compared to Gnosticism in scholarly criticism.
- The story of Genshin Impact (2020) is based on Gnosticism, featuring Gnosis as Hearts of God (Chinese: 神之心; pinyin: Shén zhī xīn).

== See also ==
- Gnostic churches:
  - Ecclesia Gnostica
  - Ecclesia Gnostica Catholica
  - Ecclesia Pistis Sophia
  - Gnostic Church of France
  - Johannite Church
  - Neo-Luciferian Church
- Jungian interpretation of religion
