= EGCA (disambiguation) =

EGCA most frequently refers to the European Green Capital Award.

EGCA may also refer to:

- Elk Grove, California, city in the United States
- Église Gnostique Catholique Apostolique, American neo-Gnostic Christian church
