= Matthew McBlain Thomson =

Scottish-born Mormon, Freemason and fraudster

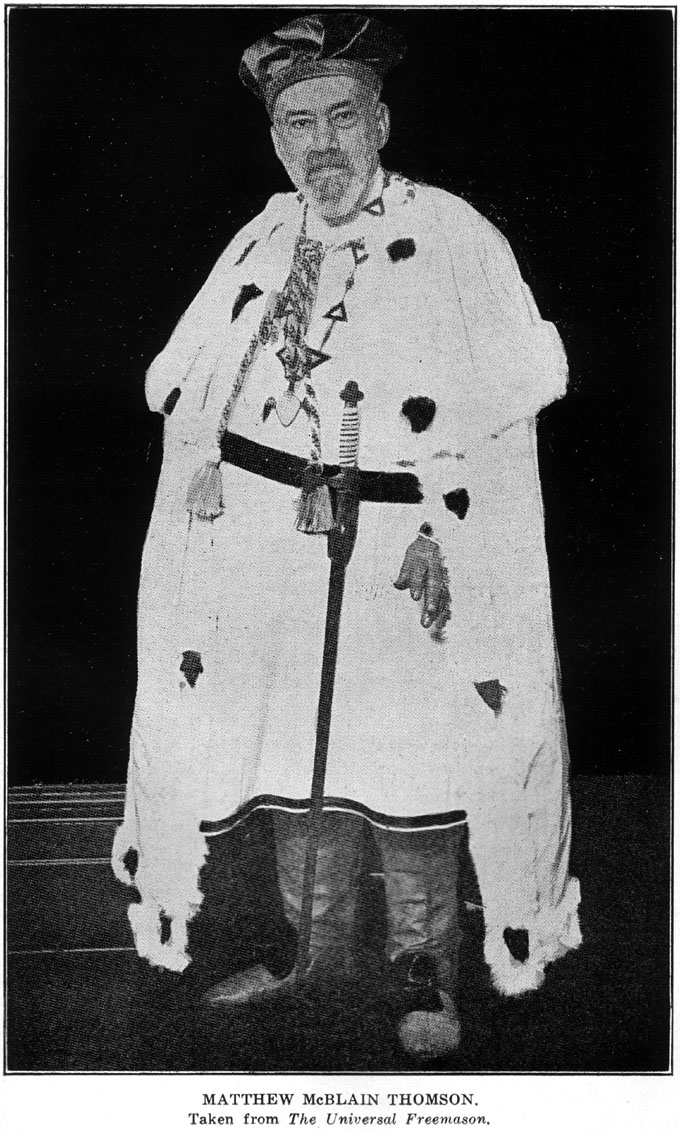
- Thomson in Masonic regalia
- Born: Matthew McBlain Thomson; January 9, 1854; Ayr, Ayrshire, Scotland
- Died: September 13, 1932 (aged 78); Salt Lake City, Utah, U.S.
- Burial place: Salt Lake City Cemetery
- Occupation: house painter

Matthew McBlain Thomson (9 January 1854 – 13 September 1932) was a Scottish-born convert to Mormonism, Freemason and a convicted fraudster.

== Masonic activities ==
Thomson was born in Ayr, Scotland on 9 January 1854. He was by trade a house painter. He became a Freemason in 1874 while still living in Scotland. In 1881, Thomson immigrated to Idaho, United States, where he joined the King Solomon Lodge in Montpelier, Idaho. Eventually, the lodge members refused to accept his Masonic degrees from Scotland and also accused him, as a Mormon taking part in the Temple endowment ceremony, of practicing a "clandestine" form of Masonry.

After leaving "regular" Freemasonry as practiced under the Grand Lodge of Idaho, Thomson founded his own Masonic organization, the American Masonic Federation (AMF), and began practicing what he called "Universal Masonry", which accepted Mormons as members. In 1908, he founded a lodge in Helper, Utah and in 1909 moved his organization to Salt Lake City, Utah. Thomson claimed the AMF descended from an African-American lodge in New Orleans, and accepted blacks as members unlike the "regular" Grand Lodges of the time.

He sold Masonic degrees by mail to "shopkeepers, workers and other people" mainly from Utah, who as Mormons were not eligible to become Freemasons under the Grand Lodge of Utah. In 1918, Thomson dedicated a Masonic temple. He also published a periodical entitled the Universal Freemason, in which he attacked the Grand Lodge of Utah's policy of exclusion. The Grand Lodge of Utah protested Thomson's activities, and sent a letter to all Utah Masons warning them that AMF lodges were "clandestine, spurious, and fraudulent".

== Contacts with European "fringe" Freemasonry ==
Despite being rejected by "regular" Grand Lodges in America, Thomson and his organization were welcomed by the main "fringe" Freemasons of Europe, including Jean Bricaud and Theodor Reuss. In July 1920, Thomson organized a "Universal World Masonic Congress" in Zurich, Switzerland, where a number of "fringe" European Masonic groups were represented. As a result of the congress, the "Universal Masonic World Federation" was founded, presided over by Thomson with Bricaud as treasurer. Reuss was initially planned by Thomson to be appointed the secretary of the new Federation, but the post eventually went to Hans-Rudolph Hilfiker-Dunn.

Notably absent from the Congress was Aleister Crowley, a high-ranking member of Reuss' organization Ordo Templi Orientis (O.T.O), who at the time was running his "Abbey of Thelema" at Cefalu, Sicily. In his diary, Crowley writes that he was invited to the Zürich meeting, but declined to attend, preferring to remain "the Secret Master". It seems, however, that Thomson was in contact with Crowley: in his Confessions Crowley writes that he received a "shower of diplomas, from Bucharest to Salt Lake City", an obvious reference to Thomson. Thomson apparently conferred upon Crowley the title of "Past Grand Master of the United States of America", a title which Masons historically planned to give to George Washington.

== Mail fraud trial and conviction ==
In 1915, the United States Post Office Department began investigating Thomson. In 1922, Thomson and his associates were convicted by the United States District Court for the District of Utah for mail fraud and sentenced to two years in the Leavenworth federal prison and fined $5,000 each. Thomson was convicted for selling Masonic degrees by mail while misrepresenting "the standing and character" of his Masonic organization by claiming it was "the only regular, legitimate, and true Scottish Rite body in America". Thomson claimed that he was persecuted as a Mormon by an anti-Mormon Utah Masonry, but this was denied by the prosecutor.

Prosecuting attorney Isaac Blair Evans authored a 1922 book entitled The Thomson Masonic Fraud: A Study in Clandestine Masonry about the trial.

== Legacy ==
Thomson died in Salt Lake City on 13 September 1932.

The American Masonic Federation was apparently still in existence in the 1970s.

== See also ==
- Mormonism and Freemasonry
