= Léonce Fabre des Essarts =

French occultist, Symbolist poet and politician

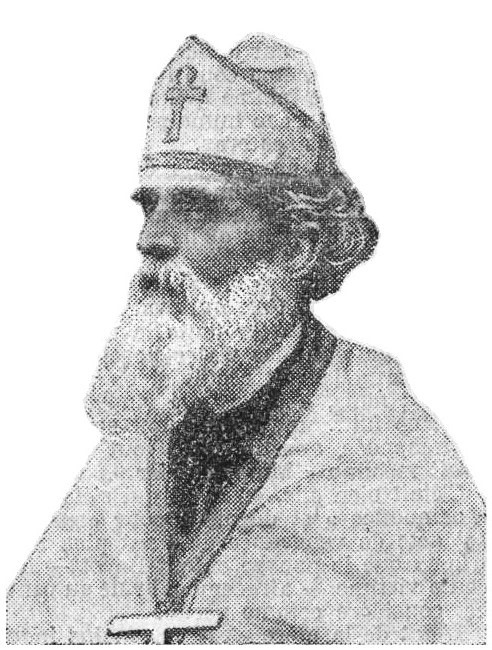
Des Essarts as "patriarch Synésius" of the Gnostic Church

Léonce-Eugène-Joseph Fabre des Essarts (19 March 1848 – 17 October 1917) was a French occultist, Symbolist poet, politician and theorist on Gnosticism and Esoteric Christianity.

== Life ==
Born in Aouste-sur-Sye, he became a Fourierist and pacifist as well as secretary of Louis Andrieux under Boulangism. He was also deputy for Var as a republican-socialist, becoming friends with Victor Hugo and was crowned at the Jeux floraux in Toulouse as well as being involved in the administration of state education.

He was one of the first bishops consecrated by Jules Doinel's Gnostic Church of France, taking the name "Tau Synesius" as Bishop of Bordeaux. After Doinel broke with that church, Fabre des Essarts was elected patriarch in 1896, collaborating with his fellow Gnostic bishop Louis-Sophrone Fugairon (Tau Sophronius) to develop the Church. In 1900 he allowed Doinel to be re-admitted to the Church and re-consecrated bishop of Alet and Mirepoix under the name "Tau Jules".

In 1901 Fabre des Essarts consecrated Jean Bricaud (1881-1934) bishop of Lyon under the name "Tau Johannes", followed by twelve other Gnostic bishops between 1903 and 1910, including Léon Champrenaud / "Tau Théophane" (1870-1925) as bishop of Versailles; René Guénon / "Tau Palingénius" (1886-1951) as bishop of Alexandria and Patrice Genty / "Tau Basilide" (1883-1964). He also founded a synarchist Masonic lodge and contributed to the occultist review L'Initiation. He died in 1917 at Grenoble according to some sources or Versailles according to others.

== Works ==
=== Author ===
- Humanité, Paris : A. Lemerre, 1885
- La force, le droit et les trois chambres, Paris : E. Girand, 1885
- Mon maître : réponse à Mme Claire Vautier, Paris : impr. A.-M. Beaudelot, 1887
- La maison de Victor Hugo et la famille de Lusignan, Fabre des Essarts & Michelis di Rienzi, Paris : typographie A.-M. Beaudelot, 1887
- Fabre Des Essarts. Pour lui. - Le Bouquet de la sœur, par Mathilde Fabre Des Essarts, Toulon : Impr. toulonnaise, 1894
- L'Arbre gnostique, par Synésius, Paris : Chamuel, 1899
- Odes phalanstériennes; [Appendice] Victor Considérant, notes intimes, extrait du journal "la Méditerranée", 15 janvier 1894, Montreuil-sous-Bois (Seine) : au bureau de "la Rénovation, 1900
- Les Hiérophantes, études sur les fondateurs de religions depuis la Révolution jusqu'à ce jour. 1re série... Fouché, Chaumette, Chantreau et le culte de la Raison; Robespierre et l'Être suprême; J.-B. Chemin, Valentin Haüy et les théophilanthropes..., Paris : Chacornac, 1905
- Sadisme, satanisme et gnose, Paris : Bodin, 1906
- Le Christ sauveur, drame gnostique en 3 journées, Paris : Bibliothèque Chacornac, 1907
- Les Dessous de l'affaire Gilly-Andrieux, Paris : A. Savine, 1888

=== Forewords ===
- Les enseignements secrets de la gnose, Simon [Albert de Pouvourville] et Théophane [Léon Champrenaud] Matgioï; [avant-propos de Jean-Pierre Laurant]; [avant-propos de Synésius], Paris : R. Dumas, cop. 1975
- Le procès des Trente : vu à travers la presse de l'époque telle qu'elle a été conservée par Madame Fénéon mère et annotée par Félix Fénéon à l'issue de son procès / préliminaire d'Emile de Saint-Auban; préface de Fabre des Essarts; Edition établie par Maurice Imbert, Paris : Histoires littéraires, impr. 2004

=== As translator ===
- Les Églogues de Virgile : interprétées en vers français, avec une étude de P. Laignel sur Virgile & la pastorale; gravures d'après l'antique; [épître liminaire de Maurice Croiset], Paris : Charles, 1901
