= Theodor Reuss =

German occultist, journalist, and singer

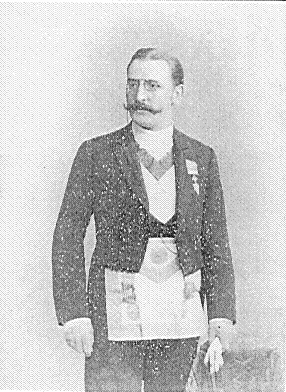
Theodor Reuss (1855–1923)

Albert Karl Theodor Reuss (German: [ˈteːodoːɐ̯ ˈʁɔʏs]; June 28, 1855 – October 28, 1923), also known by his neo-Gnostic bishop title of Carolus Albertus Theodorus Peregrinus, was a German occultist, freemason, illuminatus, martinist, rosicrucian, theosophist, journalist, singer and founder of Ordo Templi Orientis.

== Early years ==
Reuss was the son of an innkeeper Franz Xavier Reuss and his wife Eva Barbara Margaret Wagner at Augsburg. He was a professional singer in his youth, and was introduced to Ludwig II of Bavaria, in 1873. He took part in the first performance of Wagner's Parsifal at Bayreuth in 1882. Reuss later became a newspaper correspondent, and travelled frequently as such to England, where he became a Mason at the Pilger Loge No. 238 of the United Grand Lodge of England in 1876. He also spent some time there as a journalist and as a music-hall singer under the stage name "Charles Theodore."

In 1876, Reuss married a woman ten years his senior, Delphina Garbois from Dublin, and moved to Munich in 1878. Their marriage was annulled, due to bigamy (Hergemöller, 1998). They had a son, Albert Franz Theodor Reuss (1879–1958), a self-educated zoologist who lived in Berlin (Krecsák and Bohle 2008).

== Police spy ==
In 1885, in England, Reuss joined the Socialist League. He had been quite involved as a librarian and labour secretary. On May 7, 1886 he was expelled as a police spy in the pay of the Prussian Secret Police. This took place in a sectarian atmosphere, with tensions between anarcho-communist Josef Peukert and the Bakuninist Victor Dave where such accusations were often made without substance. However, this accusation came from the Belgian Social Democrats, and was raised here by Henry Charles. Peukert and the Gruppe Autonomie published a rebuttal of these allegations which appeared in the Anarchist, which also accused Dave of being a spy. However, in February 1887 Reuss used the unwitting Peukert to track down Johann Neve, an arms smuggler, in Belgium, who was then arrested by the German police.

== Ordo Templi Orientis ==
In 1880, in Munich, he participated in an attempt to revive Adam Weishaupt's Bavarian Order of Illuminati. While in England, he became friends with William Wynn Westcott, the Supreme Magus of the Societas Rosicruciana in Anglia and one of the founders of the Hermetic Order of the Golden Dawn. Westcott provided Reuss with a charter dated July 26, 1901 for the Swedenborgian Rite of Masonry and a letter of authorization dated February 24, 1902 to found a High Council in Germania of the Societas Rosicruciana in Anglia. Gérard Encausse provided him with a charter dated June 24, 1901 designating him Special Inspector for the Martinist Order in Germany. In 1888, in Berlin, he joined with Leopold Engel of Dresden, Max Rahn and August Weinholz in another effort to revive the Illuminati Order. In 1895, he began to discuss the formation of Ordo Templi Orientis with Carl Kellner.

The discussions between Reuss and Kellner did not lead to any positive results at the time, allegedly because Kellner disapproved of Reuss's connections with Engel. According to Reuss, upon his final separation with Engel in June 1902, Kellner contacted him and the two agreed to proceed with the establishment of the Oriental Templar Order by seeking authorizations to work the various rites of high-grade Masonry.

The French occultist and physician Gérard Encausse (perhaps better known by his pen-name Papus) was one such contact. Although not a member of a regular Masonic order, he had founded two occult fraternities: the Martinist group, l'Ordre des Supérieurs Inconnus and the Rosicrucian Kabbalistic Order of the Rose-Croix. In addition, he was a member of the Hermetic Order of the Golden Dawn, and a Bishop in a neo-Gnostic church, l'Église Gnostique de France. Encausse provided Reuss with a charter dated June 24, 1901 designating him Special Inspector for the Martinist order in Germany. He also assisted Reuss in the formation of the O.T.O. Gnostic Catholic Church by proclaiming the E.G.C. a "child" of l'Église Gnostique de France, which linked the E.G.C. to French neo-gnosticism.

Meanwhile, Westcott assisted Reuss in contacting the English Masonic scholar, John Yarker (1833–1913). Along with his associates Franz Hartmann and Henry Klein, he activated the Masonic Rites of Memphis and Mizraim and a branch of the Scottish Rite in Germany with charters from Yarker. Reuss received letters-patent as a Sovereign Grand Inspector General 33° of the Cernau Scottish Rite from Yarker dated September 24, 1902. On the same date, Yarker appears to have issued a warrant to Reuss, Franz Hartmann and Henry Klein to operate a Sovereign Sanctuary 33°-95° of the Scottish, Memphis and Mizraim rites. The original document is not extant, but a transcript of this warrant was published in 1911 in Reuss's newsletter, The Oriflamme, which commenced publication in 1902. Yarker issued a charter confirming Reuss's authority to operate said rites on July 1, 1904; and Reuss published a transcript of an additional confirming charter dated June 24, 1905. Reuss and Kellner together prepared a brief manifesto for their Order in 1903, which was published the next year in The Oriflamme.

When Carl Kellner died in 1905, the leadership of the Academia Masonica of O.T.O. transferred to Reuss, and he incorporated all his other organizations under its banner, developing the three degrees of the Academia Masonica, available to Masons only, into a coherent, self-contained initiatory system, open to both men and women. He promulgated a constitution for this new, enlarged O.T.O. on June 21, 1906 in London (his place of residence since January 1906) and the next month proclaimed himself Outer Head of the Order (O.H.O.). That same year he published Lingham-Yoni, which was a German translation of Hargrave Jennings's work Phallism, and issued a warrant to Rudolf Steiner (1861–1925, who was at the time the Secretary General of the German branch of the Theosophical Society), making him Deputy Grand Master of a subordinate O.T.O./Memphis/Mizraim Chapter and Grand Council called "Mystica Aeterna" in Berlin. Steiner quickly distanced himself from Reuss, who had allowed him access to Freemasonry, and such association was unfortunate due to public revelations that the OTO practiced sexual magic.

On June 24, 1908, Reuss attended Encausse's "International Masonic and Spiritualist Conference" in Paris. At this conference, Reuss raised Encausse to the X° of the O.T.O.'s Ecclesia Gnostica Catholica and gave him a patent to establish a "Supreme Grand Council General of the Unified Rites of Antient and Primitive Masonry for the Grand Orient of France and its Dependencies at Paris. " He possibly received in return some position of authority in the Église Catholique Gnostique. Reuss also appointed Dr. Arnold Krumm-Heller (Huiracocha, 1879–1949) as his official representative for Latin America.

== Meeting Aleister Crowley ==
While living in London, Reuss became acquainted with Aleister Crowley. In 1910, he made Crowley a VII° of O.T.O. (because of Crowley's having been given the 33° by Don Jesus Medina in an irregular Scottish Rite lodge in Mexico City), and in 1912, he conferred upon him the IX° and appointed him National Grand Master General X° for the O.T.O. in the United Kingdom of Great Britain and Ireland by charter dated June 1, 1912. Crowley's appointment included authority over an English language rite of the lower (Masonic) degrees of O.T.O. which was given the name Mysteria Mystica Maxima, or M∴M∴M∴. In 1913, Crowley issued a Constitution for the M∴M∴M∴ and the Manifesto of the M∴M∴M∴, which he subsequently redrafted and issued as Liber LII (52), the Manifesto of the O.T.O. In 1913, Crowley wrote Liber XV, the Gnostic Mass for Reuss's Gnostic Catholic Church. Crowley also dedicated his Mystery Play The Ship (1913) and a collection of poetry, The Giant's Thumb (1915) to Reuss. In 1913 he became Grand Master of the Rite of Memphis-Misraïm, a masonic group which previously included the revolutionaries Louis Blanc and Giuseppe Garibaldi amongst its ranks.

In 1914, at the outset of World War I, Reuss left England and returned to Germany. He worked briefly for the Red Cross in Berlin, then, in 1916, moved to Basel, Switzerland. While there, he established an "Anational Grand Lodge and Mystic Temple" of O.T.O. and the Hermetic Brotherhood of Light at Monte Verità, a utopian commune near Ascona founded in 1900 by Henri Oedenkoven and Ida Hofmann, which functioned as a center for the Progressive Underground. On January 22, 1917, Reuss published a manifesto for this Anational Grand Lodge, which was called "Verità Mystica." On the same date, he published a Revised O.T.O. Constitution of 1917 (based in a large part on Crowley's 1913 Constitution of the M.M.M.), with a "Synopsis of Degrees" and an abridgment of "The Message of the Master Therion" appended. Reuss held an "Anational Congress for Organising the Reconstruction of Society on Practical Cooperative Lines" at Monte Verità August 15–25, 1917. This Congress included readings of Crowley's poetry (on August 22) and a recitation of Crowley's Gnostic Mass (on August 24). On October 24, 1917, Reuss Chartered an O.T.O. Lodge, "Libertas et Fraternitas" in Zürich. This Lodge later placed itself under the Masonic jurisdiction of the Grand Lodge Alpina of Switzerland.

In 1918, Reuss published his German translation of Crowley's Gnostic Mass. In a note at the end of his translation of Liber XV, he referred to himself as, simultaneously, the Sovereign Patriarch and Primate of the Gnostic Catholic Church, and Gnostic Legate to Switzerland of the Église Gnostique Universelle, acknowledging Jean Bricaud (1881–1934) as Sovereign Patriarch of that church. The issuance of this document can be viewed as the birth of the Thelemic E.G.C. as an independent organization under the umbrella of O.T.O., with Reuss as its first Patriarch.

Reuss was clearly impressed with Thelema. Crowley's Gnostic Mass, which Reuss translated into German and had recited at his Anational Congress at Monte Verità, is an explicitly Thelemic ritual. In an undated letter to Crowley (received in 1917), Reuss reported excitedly that he had read The Message of the Master Therion to a gathering at Monte Verità, and that he was translating The Book of the Law into German. He added, "Let this news encourage you! We live in your Work!!!"

== After the First World War ==
Reuss left Monte Verità some time before November 1918. On May 10, 1919, Reuss issued a "Gauge of Amity" document to Matthew McBlain Thomson, founder of the ill-fated "American Masonic Federation." On September 18, 1919, Reuss was reconsecrated by Bricaud, thus receiving the "Antioch Succession," and re-appointed as "Gnostic Legate" to Switzerland for Bricaud's Église Gnostique Universelle. In 1920, Oedenkoven and Hofmann abandoned Monte Verità in 1920 to establish a second colony in Brazil, and Reuss published a document titled The Program of Construction and the Guiding Principles of the Gnostic Neo-Christians: O.T.O.

On July 17, 1920, he attended the Congress of the "World Federation of Universal Freemasonry" in Zürich, which lasted several days. Reuss, with Bricaud's support, advocated the adoption of the religion of Crowley's Gnostic Mass as the "official religion for all members of the World Federation of Universal Freemasonry in possession of the 18° of the Scottish Rite." Reuss's efforts in this regard were a failure, and he left the Congress after the first day. On May 10, 1921, Reuss issued X° Charters to Charles Stansfeld Jones and Heinrich Tränker to serve as Grand Masters for the US and Germany, respectively. On July 30, 1921, Reuss issued another "Gauge of Amity" document, this time to H. Spencer Lewis, founder of A.M.O.R.C., the San Jose, California based Rosicrucian organization. Reuss returned to Germany in September 1921, settling in Munich.

== Death and succession ==
There is some reason to believe that Reuss suffered a stroke in the spring of 1920, but this is not entirely certain. Crowley wrote to W.T. Smith in March 1943: "the late O.H.O., after his first stroke of paralysis, got into a panic about the work being carried on... He hastily issued honorary diplomas of the Seventh Degree to various people, some of whom had no right to anything at all and some of whom were only cheap crooks." Shortly after appointing him his Viceroy for Australia, Crowley appears to have corresponded with his friend Frank Bennett and discussed with him his doubts about Reuss's continuing ability to effectively govern the Order.

It would appear that Reuss discovered the correspondence; he wrote Crowley an angry, defensive response on November 9, 1921, in which he appeared to distance himself and O.T.O. from Thelema, which, as shown above, he had previously embraced. Crowley replied to Reuss's letter on November 23, 1921, and stated in his letter, "It is my will to be O.H.O. and Frater Superior of the Order and avail myself of your abdication—to proclaim myself as such." He signed the letter "Baphomet O.H.O." Reuss's response is not extant, but Crowley recounts in his Confessions that Reuss "resigned the office [of O.H.O.] in 1922 in my favour."

However, it does not appear that Crowley waited for Reuss's response to assume his duties. In a diary entry for November 27, 1921, Crowley wrote: "I have proclaimed myself O.H.O. Frater Superior of the Order of Oriental Templars." Reuss died on October 28, 1923. In a letter to Heinrich Tränker dated February 14, 1925, Crowley stated the following: "Reuss was very uncertain in temper, and in many ways unreliable. In his last years he seems to have completely lost his grip, even accusing The Book of the Law of communistic tendencies, than which no statement could be more absurd. Yet it seems that he must have been to some extent correctly led, on account of his having made the appointments of yourself and Frater Achad (Charles Stansfeld Jones), and designating me in his last letter as his successor." In a letter to Charles Stansfeld Jones dated Sun in Capricorn, Anno XX (Dec. 1924 - Jan. 1925), Crowley said, "in the O.H.O.'s last letter to me he invited me to become his successor as O.H.O. and Frater Superior." Reuss's letter designating Crowley his successor as O.H.O. has not been found, but no credible documentation has surfaced which would indicate that Reuss ever designated any alternative successor.

== Publications ==
Reuss's writings include:

- The Matrimonial Question from an Anarchistic Point of View (1887);
- Die Mysterien der Illuminaten (1894);
- Geschichte des Illuminaten-Ordens (1896);
- Was muss man von der Freimauerei wissen? (1901);
- Was ist Okkultismus und wie erlangt man occulte Kräfte? (1903);
- Was muss man von Richard Wagner und seinen Ton-dramen wissen? (1903);
- Allgemeine Satzungen des Ordens der Orientalischem Templer O.T.O. (1906);
- Lingam-Yoni; oder die Mysterien des Geschlechts-Kultus (1906);
- Parsifal und das Enthüllte Grals-Geheimnis (1914);
- Constitution of the Ancient Order of Oriental Templars (1917);
- Das Aufbau-Programm und die Leitsätze der Gnostischen Neo-Christen (1920);
- Die Gnostische Messe' (1920).

He also published numerous articles in his periodical Oriflamme (1902–1914).

== See also ==
- Members of Ordo Templi Orientis
