= Ecclesia Pistis Sophia =

Religious organization based on ideas and systems of early Christian and Jewish mysticism

- Ecclesia Pistis Sophia
- The Fellowship
- Sophian Fellowship
- Location: Grass Valley, CA
- Country: United States
- Denomination: Gnosticism
- Tradition: Sophian
- Website: sophian.org

History
- Former name: Community of Faith Wisdom
- Founder: Tau Malachi

Clergy
- Bishop: Tau Malachi

Ecclesia Pistis Sophia, also known as the Sophian Fellowship or simply The Fellowship, is a Gnostic church organization based in the United States.

== Etymology ==
The name Ecclesia Pistis Sophia literally means "Community of Faith-Wisdom."

== History ==
Although members claim that it dates back to at least the 1700s, the current Sophian Gnostic spiritual lineage was first started in the 1880s by Tau Miriam, an Englishwoman. In England, she initiated Tau Elijah, who, early in the twentieth century, moved to the West Coast of the United States.

Tau Elijah died and passed his spiritual lineage on to Tau Malachi eben Ha-Elijah, who later founded the Sophia Fellowship in 1983. Tau Malachi is the current bishop of Ecclesia Pistis Sophia. The church is operating in Grass Valley, California.

== Leadership ==
- Tau Miriam (mid-1880s to early 1900s)
- Tau Elijah (late 1800s to 1970s)
- Tau Malachi (Brett Cagle) (1962 to present)

== See also ==
- Gnosticism
- Gnosticism in modern times
- Ecclesia Gnostica Catholica
- Gnostic Society
- Gnostic Church of France
