= Jean Bricaud =

French student of the occult and esoteric

Tau Jean II
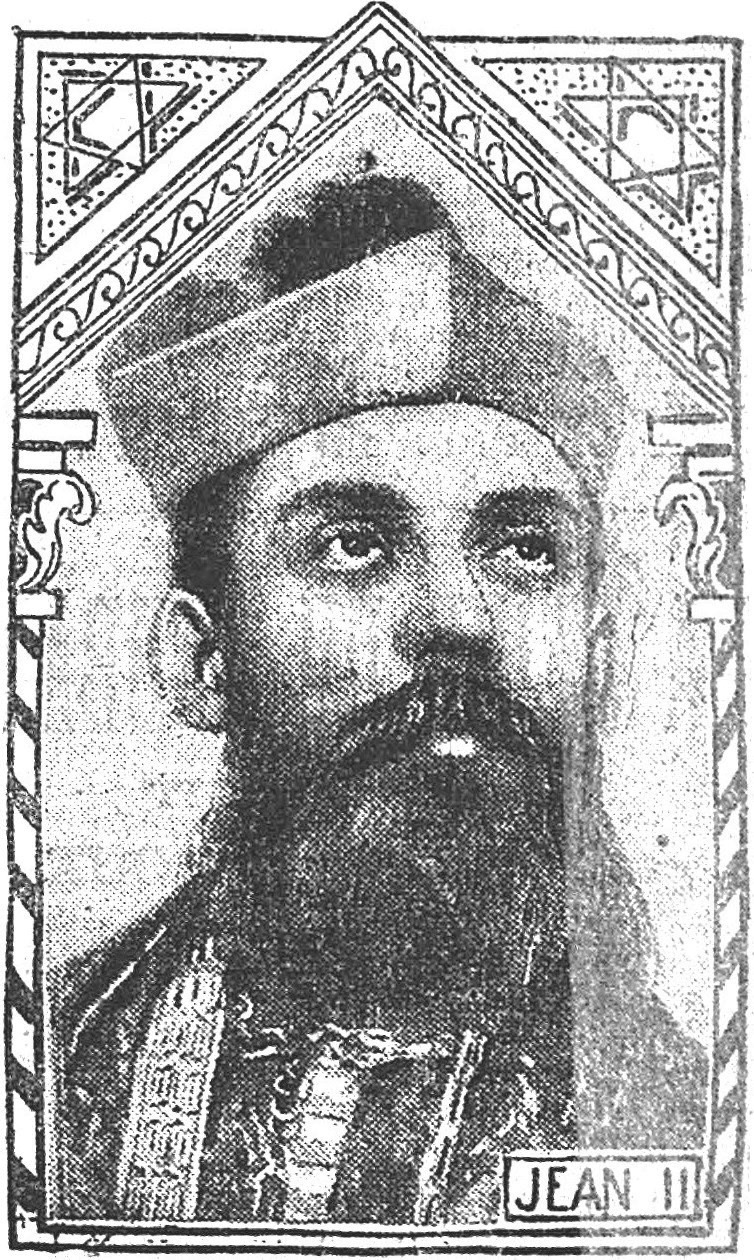
- Church: Universal Gnostic Church
- See: Lyon, France

Orders
- Consecration: 1901 by Léonce Fabre des Essarts
- Rank: Patriarch

Personal details
- Born: Jean Bricaud; 11 February 1881 Neuville-sur-Ain, France
- Died: 24 February 1934 (aged 53)
- Denomination: Gnostic revival

Jean (or Joanny) Bricaud (11 February 1881, Neuville-sur-Ain, Ain – 24 February 1934), also known as Tau Jean II, was a French student of the occult and esoteric matters. Bricaud was heavily involved in the French neo-Gnostic movement. He was a Gnostic bishop and the Patriarch of the Église Gnostique Universelle (French for "Universal Gnostic Church") and a central figure in the various lines of the apostolic succession of subsequent Gnostic churches, as well as a spiritual heir of Jules Doinel (Valentinus II). From 1916 he was head of the Ordre Martiniste. He was a friend of the occultists Papus and August Vandekerkhove.

== Episcopal lineages ==
In 1901, Bricaud was originally consecrated by Léonce Fabre des Essarts as Tau Johannes, Bishop of Lyon, within Jules Doinel's Gnostic Church of France founded in 1890. Doinel had claimed to have been consecrated by the spirits of dead Cathars during a spiritual experience and des Essarts owed his episcopal lineage to him, thereby placing them outside of a lineage of apostolic succession typically accepted as valid by other churches.

In addition to his consecration by Fabre des Essarts, however, Bricaud would acquire other episcopal lineages via re-consecration. Notably, he would be consecrated again as a bishop on 21 July 1913 by Louis-Marie-François Giraud, who was down-line of René Vilatte in the Syrian Orthodox Church's lineage of apostolic succession.

== See also ==
- Jules Doinel
- Eugène Vintras
- Bernard-Raymond Fabré-Palaprat
