= Stephan A. Hoeller =

American author and bishop (1931–2026)

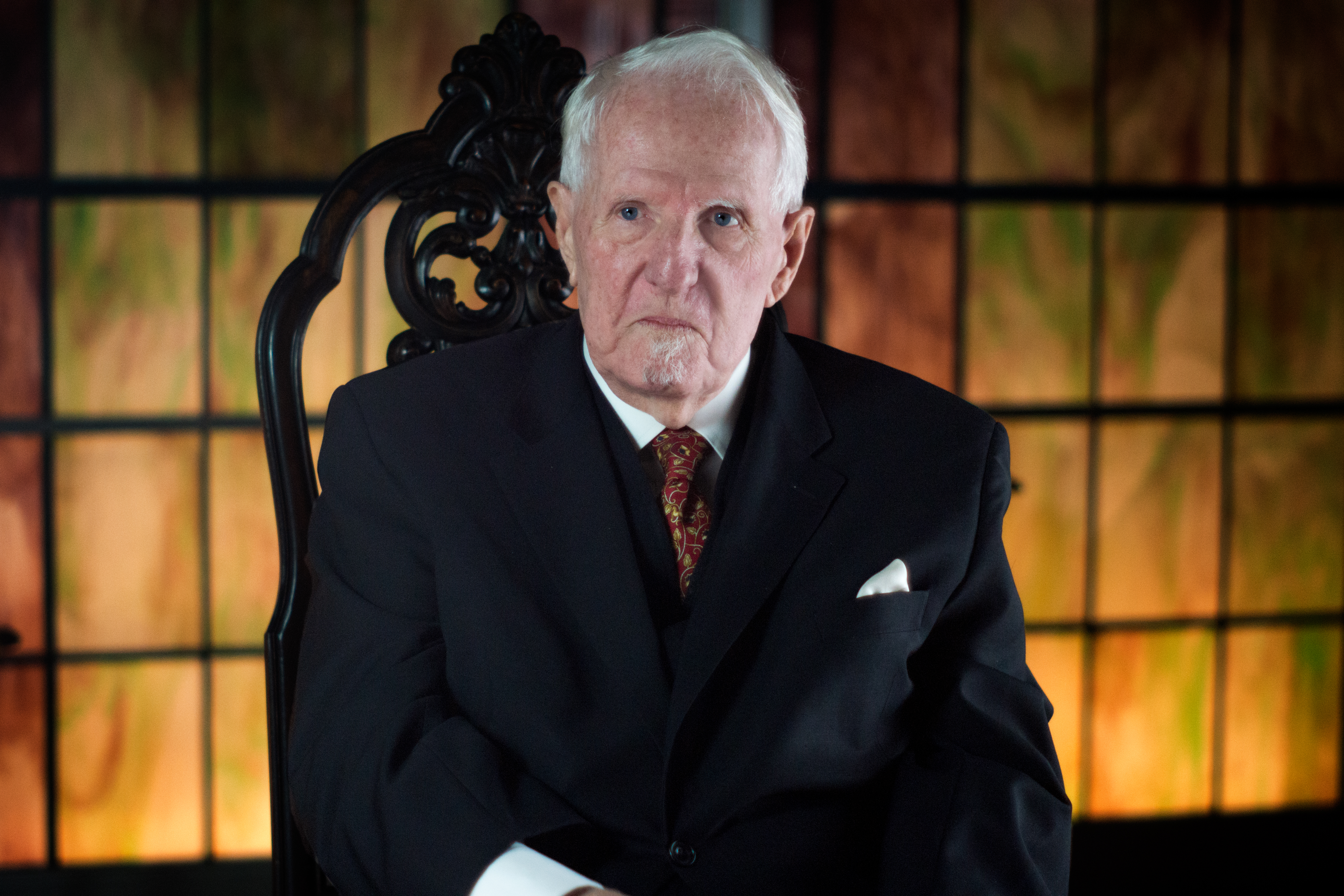
- Hoeller in 2020
- Born: Istvan Hoeller; November 27, 1931 (age 94); Budapest, Hungary
- Died: May 3, 2026
- Writings: The Gnostic Jung and the Seven Sermons to the Dead; Gnosticism: New Light on the Ancient Tradition of Inner Knowing; Jung and the Lost Gospels; The Royal Road: A Manual of Kabalistic Meditations on the Tarot; Freedom: Alchemy for a Voluntary Society

Stephan A. Hoeller (November 27, 1931 – May 3, 2026) was an American author, lecturer and neo-Gnostic bishop.

== Career ==
A lecturer and writer of books and articles about Gnosticism and Jungian psychology, Hoeller was also Regionary Bishop of Ecclesia Gnostica.

Hoeller was ordained to the priesthood in the American Catholic Church by Bishop Lowell P. Wadle in 1958, and consecrated bishop by Richard Duc de Palatine on April 9, 1967. After the death of Palatine, Hoeller changed Palatine's church's name — the Pre-Nicene Gnostic Catholic Church — to Ecclesia Gnostica, and has since held the title of Regionary Bishop.

Hoeller lectured in Australia, New Zealand, the United Kingdom, Sweden, Norway, Iceland, Hungary, Germany, and the United States. He was a member of the lecturing faculty of the late Manly P. Hall's Philosophical Research Society, and a speaker for the Theosophical Society in America. His articles were published in Gnosis and Quest Magazine.

== Partial bibliography ==
- The Royal Road: A Manual of Kabalistic Meditations on the Tarot (1975), ISBN 0-8356-0465-9 Second Edition republished as: The Fool's Pilgrimage, Kabbalistic Meditations on the Tarot (2004) ISBN 0-8356-0839-5
- The Gnostic Jung and the Seven Sermons to the Dead (1982), ISBN 0-8356-0568-X
- Jung and the Lost Gospels (1989), ISBN 0-8356-0646-5
- Freedom: Alchemy for a Voluntary Society (1992), ISBN 0-8356-0678-3
- Gnosticism: New Light on the Ancient Tradition of Inner Knowing (2002), ISBN 0-8356-0816-6

== See also ==
- Manly P. Hall
- Tau Malachi
