= Larmenius Charter =

Coded Latin manuscript

Larmenius Charter (Carta Transmissionis trans: Charter of Transmission)
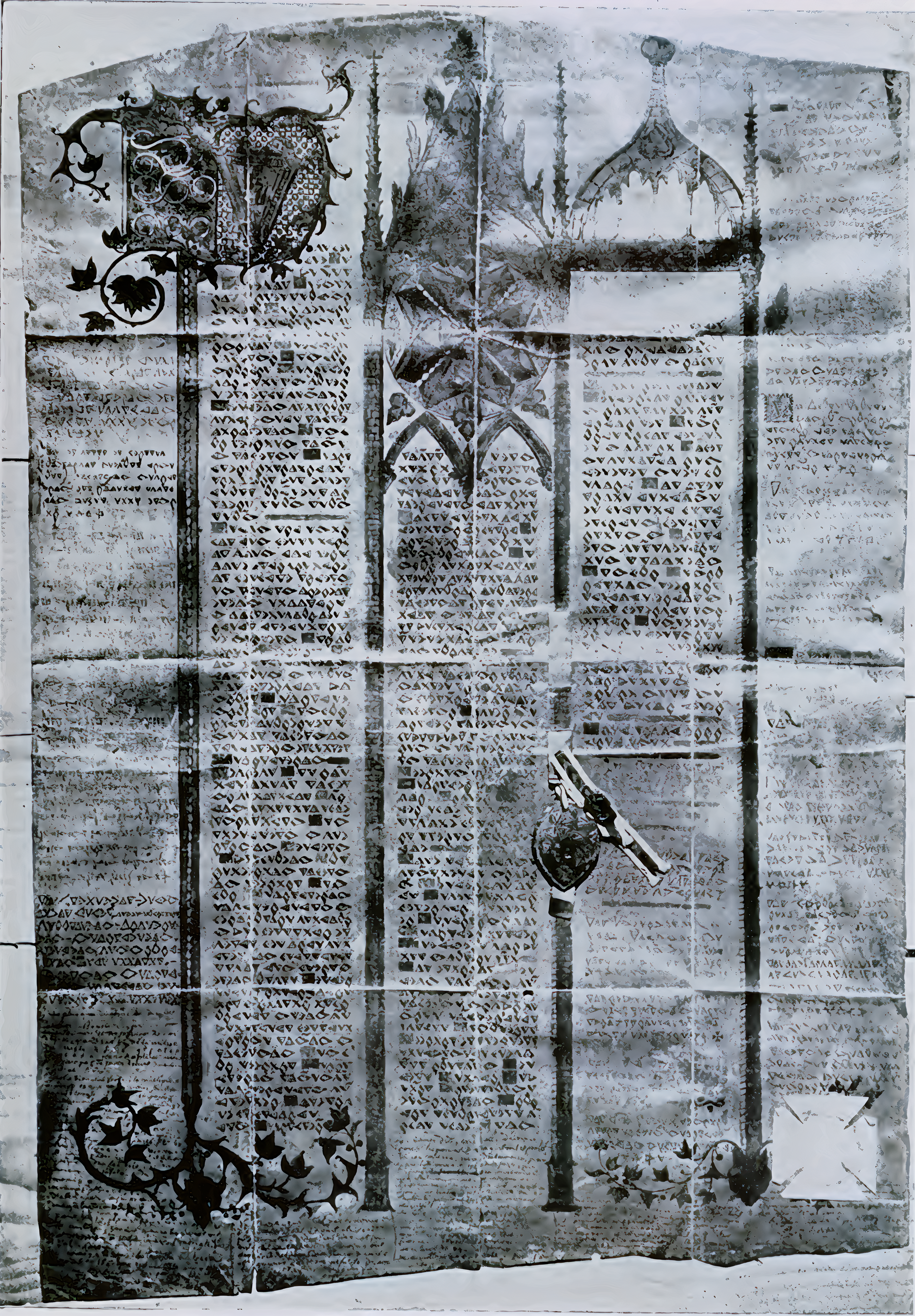
- Created: February 1324 (claimed), 1804 (first appeared)
- Location: Mark Masons Hall, London
- Author: Johannes Marcus Larmenius (claimed)
- Media type: Vellum document
- Purpose: Detailing the transfer of leadership of the Knights Templar to Jean Marc Larmenius after the death of Jacques de Molay

The Larmenius Charter or Carta Transmissionis (transl. Charter of Transmission) is a coded Latin manuscript purportedly created by Johannes Marcus Larmenius (Fr.: Jean-Marc Larmenius) in February 1324, detailing the transfer of leadership of the Knights Templar to Larmenius after the death of Jacques de Molay.

It also has appended to it a list of 22 successive grand masters of the Knights Templar after de Molay, ending in 1804, the name of Bernard-Raymond Fabré-Palaprat appearing last on the list. The document is written in a supposed devised ancient Knights Templar codex. The document first appeared publicly in 1804.

The document is widely agreed by modern scholars to be a forgery, though a number of speculative occultist writers have disputed this. There is no evidence that the Knights Templar survived their suppression. John Walker noted that, "there is no evidence that the Templars in the Middle Ages used any form of Latin cipher; the standard of the Latin translation is modern rather than medieval; the grammar is too consistent for a medieval charter; and (perhaps most tellingly) there is absolutely no evidence that a person named John Mark Larmenius ever existed." Some scholars have argued it was created by a doctor named Ledru, who may have made the forgery without Fabré-Palaprat knowing.

Despite it being a forgery, it was widely used as proof of a connection between revivalist neo-Templar groups, Templar freemasons, and the original Knights Templar, by members of these occultist groups. Some of these groups reject the authenticity of the manuscript.
