= Neuville-sur-Ain =

Commune in Auvergne-Rhône-Alpes, France

- Commune
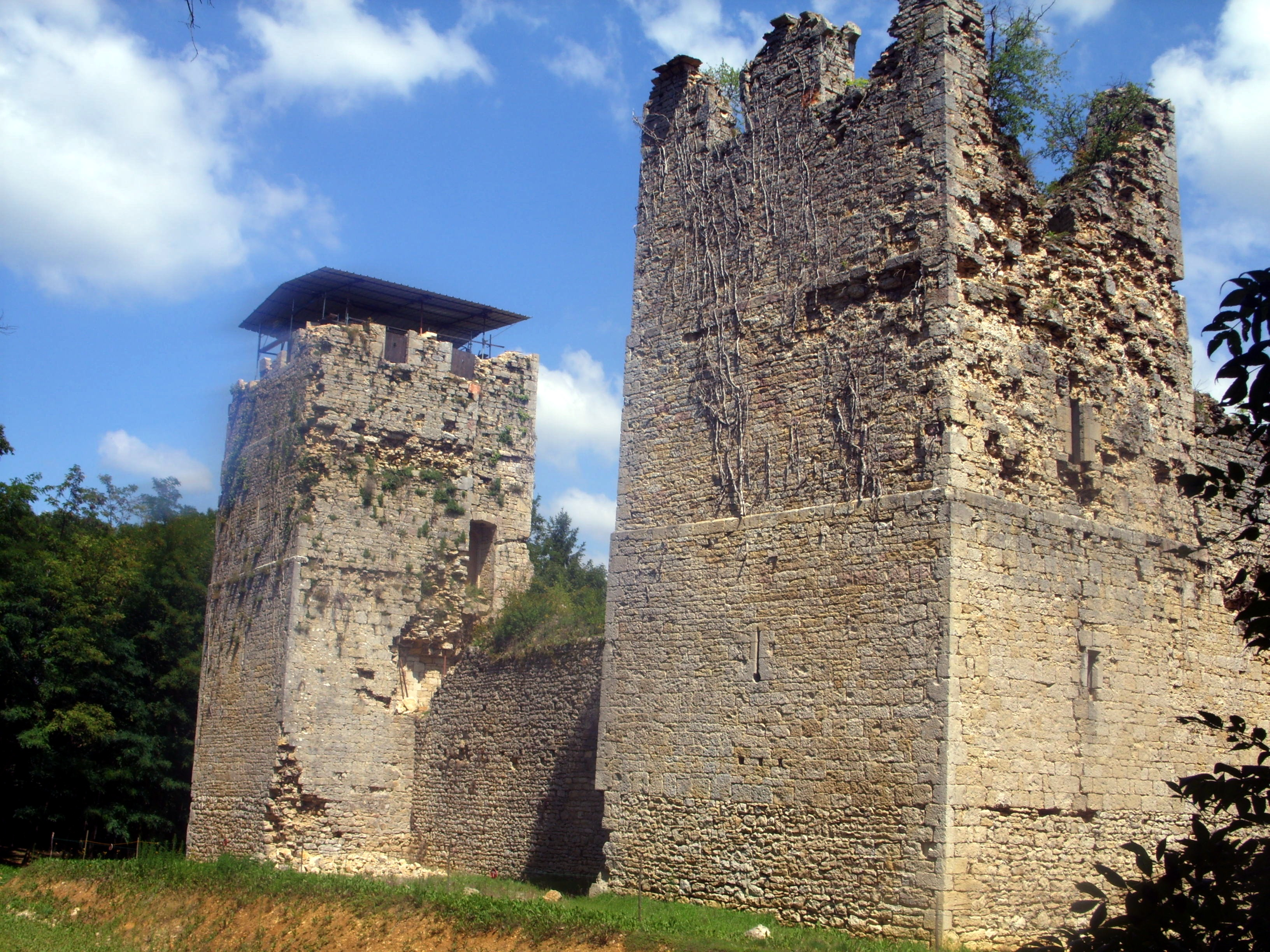
- Thol chateau

- Coat of arms
- Location of Neuville-sur-Ain
- Location within France Location within Auvergne-Rhône-Alpes
- Coordinates: 46°05′00″N 5°22′00″E
- Country: France
- Region: Auvergne-Rhône-Alpes
- Department: Ain
- Arrondissement: Nantua
- Canton: Pont-d'Ain

Government
  - Mayor (2026–32): Georges Curt
- Area^{1}: 19.79 km^{2} (7.64 sq mi)
- Elevation: 300 m (980 ft)
- Highest elevation: 427 m (1,401 ft)
- Lowest elevation: 242 m (794 ft)
- Population (2023): 1,794
  - Density: 90.65/km^{2} (234.8/sq mi)
- Time zone: UTC+01:00 (CET)
  - Summer (DST): UTC+02:00 (CEST)
- INSEE/Postal code: 01273 /01160
- ^{1} French Land Register data, which excludes lakes, ponds, glaciers > 1 km^{2} (0.386 sq mi or 247 acres) and river estuaries.

Neuville-sur-Ain (French pronunciation: [nøvil syʁ ɛ̃], literally Neuville on Ain) is a commune in the Ain department in eastern France.

== Population ==
Historical population
Year	Pop.	±% p.a.
1968	932	—
1975	979	+0.71%
1982	945	−0.50%
1990	1,151	+2.50%
1999	1,236	+0.79%
2007	1,483	+2.30%
2012	1,595	+1.47%
2017	1,756	+1.94%
2023	1,794	+0.36%
Source: INSEE

== See also ==
- Communes of the Ain department
