= Gnostic Church of France =

Neo-gnostic Christian church

- Église gnostique de France
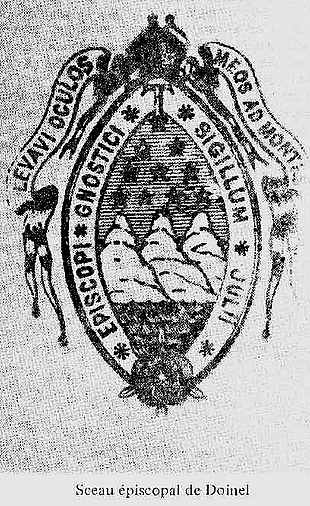
- Episcopal Seal of Jules Doinel
- Type: Gnosticism
- Founder: Jules Doinel
- Origin: 1890

The Gnostic Church of France (French: Église gnostique de France) is a neo-Gnostic Christian organisation formed by Jules Doinel in 1890, in France. It is the first Gnostic church in modern times.

== History ==
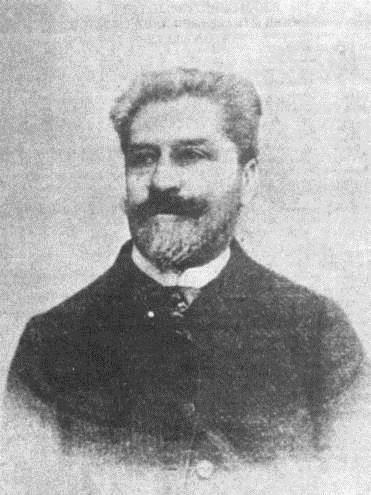
Jules Doinel, the founder and first patriarch of Église gnostique de France.

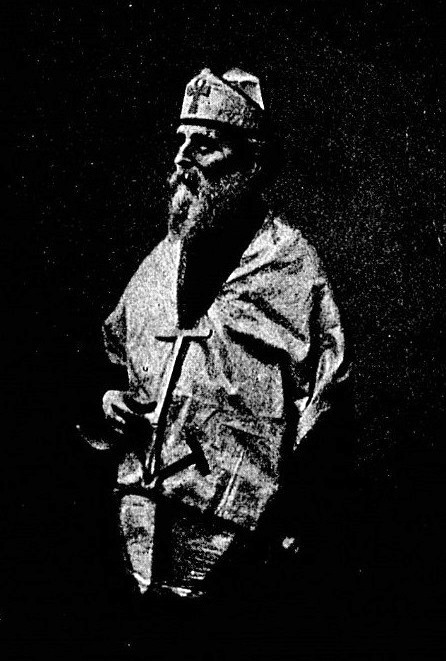
Léonce Fabre des Essarts as the second patriarch of Église gnostique.

The esoteric Freemason Jules Doinel, while working as archivist for the library of Orléans in France, discovered a medieval manuscript dated 1022, which had been written by Stephen, a canon of the Orléans Cathedral, burned at the stake in 1022 for his pre-Cathar Gnostic doctrines (see Orléans heresy). Doinel founded the Gnostic Church in 1890, which he and his followers called "the first year of the Restoration of Gnosis". Doinel claimed that he had a vision in which the Aeon Jesus appeared and charged Doinel with the work of establishing a new church. When Doinel attended a séance in the oratory of the Countess of Caithness, it was said that the disembodied spirits of ancient Albigensians, joined by a heavenly voice, laid spiritual hands on Doinel, anointing him as the bishop of the Gnostic Church.

As patriarch of the new Church, Doinel took the mystical name 'Valentinus II, Bishop of the Holy Assembly of the Paraclete and of the Gnostic Church' (after the 2nd century Gnostic Christian leader Velentinus), and nominated eleven titular bishops, including a 'sophia' (female bishop), as well as deacons and deaconesses. The Symbolist poet Léonce Fabre des Essarts was named bishop of Bordeaux. The dress of Gnostic bishops is characterized by purple gloves and the use of Tau symbol, a Greek letter which is also used before their names.

In 1892, Doinel consecrated Papus—founder of the first Martinist Order—as Tau Vincent, Bishop of Toulouse. Other Martinists, such as Paul Sédir and Lucien Chamuel were also consecrated by Doinel. At the end of 1894, Doinel abjured his Gnostic faith and converted to Roman Catholicism due to the Taxil hoax. He returned to Gnosticism five years later under the mystical name Simon and the title 'Primate of Samaria'.

In 1908, a schism occurred when the Gnostic bishop of Lyon, Jean Bricaud, renamed his branch as Église gnostique catholique (E.G.C.; Catholic Gnostic Church). Then it changed again becoming the Église gnostique universelle (E.G.U.; Universal Gnostic Church) and became the official church of Papus' Martinist Order. The patriarch Bricaud claimed the spiritual heritage of John of Patmos. The E.G.U. later changed its name to Église gnostique apostolique (E.G.A.; Apostolic Gnostic Church). Meanwhile, the original Église gnostique in Paris had been taken over by Léon Champrenaud (Théophane), it later disintegrated under Patrice Genty (Basilide) in 1926.

== Église Gnostique Catholique Apostolique ==
The Église Gnostique Catholique Apostolique (E.G.C.A.), in Latin Ecclesia Gnostica Apostolica Catholica (not to be confused with Ecclesia Gnostica Catholica), or known as the Gnostic Catholic Apostolic Church of North America, which operates in New York, claims the heritage of Église gnostique de France. This church is in a state of fraternal alliance (concordat) with the Ecclesia Gnostica. Like the latter, it also accepts the ordination of women and same-sex marriage.

In addition, the E.G.C.A. has affiliation with two other initiatic organisations: the Ordre Martiniste of North America and the Aesthetic Rose+Croix Order of the Temple and the Grail. The latter is a reconstitution of Joséphin Péladan's Ordre de la Rose ✠ Croix Catholique et Esthétique du Temple et du Graal.

== Église Gnostique, Ecclesia Gnostica Catholica, and Ecclesia Gnostica Universalis ==
The Ecclesia Gnostica Catholica (E.G.C.) descended from a line of the above-mentioned 19th-century French Gnostic Revival Churches. These Églises Gnostiques, as well as the Église Gnostique Catholique Apostolique, are essentially Christian in nature, except for the Ecclesia Gnostica Catholica. Although Gnosticism is seen as heresy in an orthodox Christian sense, the E.G.C. goes even further by worshipping such figures like Babalon, Baphomet, et cetera. Interestingly, also in this Thelemic-Gnostic milieu an Ecclesia Gnostica Universalis eventually rose, in reaction to the Patriarch of E.G.U. binding the clergy of the church to advancement into the degrees of Ordo Templi Orientis, in strict opposition with the original plan laid out by the Prophet of Thelema, Aleister Crowley.
