= Neo-Luciferian Church =

Gnostic and Luciferian organisation

- Symbol of the Neo-Luciferian Church
- Formation: 2005
- Founder: Bjarne Salling Pedersen; Michael Bertiaux
- Type: Luciferian Gnostic religious organisation
- Location(s): Denmark and Sweden
- Affiliations: Succession from Gnostic/magical churches, incl. Ecclesia Gnostica Spiritualis

The Neo-Luciferian Church is a Luciferian Gnostic organisation with roots in Western esotericism, Thelema, and magic.

== History ==
The Neo-Luciferian Church began in 2005 as a collaboration between Danish occultist Bjarne Salling Pedersen and the American artist, author, and philosopher Michael Bertiaux. The Church was inspired as a reawakening and modern interpretation of the Luciferian Gnosticism advocated by early 1900s Danish occultist and Ordo Templi Orientis member Ben Kadosh, pseudonym of Carl William Hansen. Today the organisation is primarily active in Denmark and Sweden.

== Teachings ==
The Neo-Luciferian Church incorporates elements from Thelema, Gnosticism, Voodoo, occultism, and witchcraft. There is an emphasis on art, psychology, and critical thinking. It also focuses heavily on the arts.

The mythology draws heavily on Roman and Greek sources as well as more modern writings, such as Charles Leland's Aradia, or the Gospel of the Witches, the works of Dion Fortune, Michael Bertiaux, and Aleister Crowley.

The Neo-Luciferian Church operates within a graded system of seven degrees. It is a succession from several churches: some Gnostic and magical in origin, and others belonging to the succession described in the Ecclesia Gnostica Spiritualis.
