= Michael Bertiaux =

American occultist (born 1935)

- Born: Michael Paul Bertiaux; January 18, 1935 (age 91); Seattle, Washington, U.S.
- Occupation: Occult writer

Michael Paul Bertiaux (born January 18, 1935) is an American occultist, known for his book Voudon Gnostic Workbook (1988), a 615-page compendium of various occult lessons and research papers spanning the sub-fields of Voodoo, Neo-Pythagoreanism, Thelema and Gnosticism. Long considered by occultists one of the underground classics of 20th century occultism, the book was out of print for many years and fetched increasingly high prices in the antiquarian market before it was reprinted in paperback by Red Wheel/Weiser in 2007. Note that the unique spelling of "voudon" is an innovation of Bertiaux's, (though it is similar to the traditional spelling of vodun). Bertiaux also coined the term vudutronics to refer to his idiosyncratic interpretation of this religion.

== Early life ==
Bertiaux was born in Seattle, Washington, on January 18, 1935. His father was a captain in the merchant navy and his mother was a prominent Theosophist. Bertiaux served as an Episcopalian minister in the Seattle area before traveling to Haiti in 1964.

== Voudon and other occult activities ==
In 1964, Bertiaux traveled to Haiti, where he was initiated into the system of Haitian Vodoun. He settled in Chicago in 1966, where he formed (among other bodies) the Neo-Pythagorean Gnostic Church. Bertiaux's interpretation of Vodoun was strongly influenced by Martinism, a Francophone occultist society who claimed to inherit from the teachings of Louis-Claude De Saint Martin, although the regularity and mere existence of such a linkage was questioned, and which became established in Haiti in the 18th century.

Bertiaux had long been associated with Ordo Templi Orientis Antiqua, an initiatic gnostic-magical order supposedly founded in 1921 in Haiti by the gnostic patriarch and Voudon high priest Lucien-Francois Jean-Maine. The O.T.O.A. "tradition" comes from the gnostic voudon, as practiced in secret societies. There, a synthesis was purportedly developed between European gnostic-hermetic currents, being the heritage of the ancient western initiatic tradition, and Haitian metaphysics. Within the group, the O.T.O.A. works through the Monastery of the Seven Rays system. Both of these organizations cooperate with the gnostic church Ecclesia Gnostica Spiritualis.

La Couleuvre Noire (The Black Snake) is an independent order founded in 1922, closely cooperating with the O.T.O.A. It is dedicated to the practice of advanced techniques of Gnostic Voudon, a system of "Afro-Atlantean magic". Today, Courtney Willis (Tau Ogdoade-Orfeo VIII) is the Hierophant and the Sovereign Grand Master Absolute (SGMA) of the L.C.N. as well as the S.G.M.A. of the O.T.O.A. Michael Bertiaux (Tau Ogdoade-Orfeo IV) is the Grand Conservateur of the L.C.N. and the Hierophant of the O.T.O.A.

For a period, Michael Bertiaux was also a secretary of the Theosophical Society until moving to Chicago in 1966, where he trained and qualified as a social worker, a job he remained in for just under forty years. He specialized in working with the Chicago Haitian community, which currently has a population of around 5,000-15,000.

Bertiaux's life and occult system are examined in Kenneth Grant's books, Cults of the Shadow (1975), Nightside of Eden (1977), Outside the Circles of Time (1980), and Hecate's Fountain (1993). Grant devotes two entire chapters of Cults of the Shadow to a discussion and analysis of Bertiaux's work in La Couleuvre Noire, as well as a portion of the chapter "Afro-Tantric Tarot of the Kalas."

Bertiaux was also featured in the 1985 book and documentary by Nevill Drury, The Occult Experience.

Bertiaux's magical system is complex, including terms unique to himself, such as the "meon" and "Zoythrian" energies but also drawing on magical extensions of the writings of H.P. Lovecraft and the teachings of A. Crowley's Aiwass.

Following his retirement, Bertiaux has focused on his art and writing.

== Books ==
=== Monastery of the Seven Rays ===
This is a study course to be read before the Voudon Gnostic Workbook practicum. It was originally published as a mail order study course and for many years was only available in unauthorized scans and PDFs on the Internet. In 2020, the Year 1 course was published in authorized English and Italian editions by Il Labirinto Stellare.

- Monastery of the Seven Rays, Year 1, Student Degrees (1967). Republished by Media Print Editore, 2021.
- Monastery of the Seven Rays, Year 2, Sexual Magic (1969). Republished by Media Print Editore, 2021.
- Monastery of the Seven Rays, Year 3, Esoteric Engineering
- Monastery of the Seven Rays, Year 4, Esoteric Magic

=== Other books ===
- The Voudon Gnostic Workbook (1988). Reissued by Weiser 2007.
- Cosmic Meditation. Fulgur Limited, 2007.
- Vudu Cartography. Fulgur Limited, 2010.
- Ontological Graffiti. Fulgur Limited, 2016.
- Cagliostro; Autobiogaffia Spiritusta, Media Print Editore, 2017.
- Cagliostro; The Secret Lives, Volume I/III, Media Print Editore, 2021.
- Cagliostro; The Secret Lives, Volume II/III, Media Print Editore, 2021.
- Cagliostro; The Secret Lives, Volume III/III, Media Print Editore, 2022.
- Servants of the Star & the Snake, short story, "Shatki in Chinatown", Starfire Publishing Ltd., 2018.
- 3 Magic Heads of Gholembe, Buckland Museum of Witchcraft and Magick .2024
