= Marie Sinclair, Countess of Caithness =

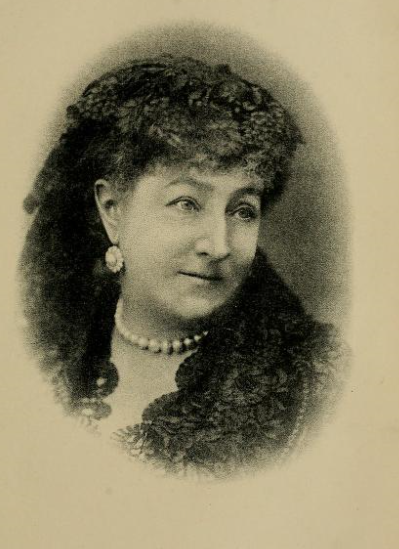
Marie, Countess of Caithness

Marie Sinclair, Countess of Caithness (1830 – 2 November 1895), formerly Marie (or Maria) de Mariategui, was a British aristocrat of Spanish descent who married, as his second wife, James Sinclair, 14th Earl of Caithness. She is particularly remembered for her interest in spiritualism and theosophy and her association with Helena Blavatsky, whose occult successor she claimed to be.

She was born in London, the daughter of a Spanish nobleman, Don José de Mariategui, and his English wife, who was descended from the Earl of Northampton.

Her first husband was General Count de Medina Pomar, by whom she had one son, Emmanuel. On his death in 1868, she inherited a considerable fortune. She married the Earl of Caithness, by then a widower, on 6 March 1872 in Edinburgh; they had no children. The earl died in 1881.

In Britain, Marie became interested in spiritualism, attending seances hosted by Florence Cook and taking an interest in the work of Allan Kardec. She joined the New York Theosophical Society in 1876, and gave financial support to assist in the expansion of theosophy in France. She met Madame Blavatsky in 1884, when the latter came to France. In 1889, and perhaps earlier, she was President of the Société Théosophique d'Orient et d'Occident.

The countess was created Duchess of Pomar by Pope Leo XIII in 1879. In her later years she lived on the Avenue de Wagram in Paris, laying out the rooms like those at Holyrood Palace in recognition of the connection she felt with Mary, Queen of Scots. She claimed that the queen's spirit had told her that "Men are asleep over the material triumphs they are crowning their brows with, or so buried among the burdens of life, they cannot be still and listen to the voice of Deific forces."

Following her death, her son from her first marriage inherited the dukedom of Medina Pomar.
