= Bernard-Raymond Fabré-Palaprat =

French physician, priest and mystic (1773–1838)

The Reverend Bernard-Raymond Fabré-Palaprat
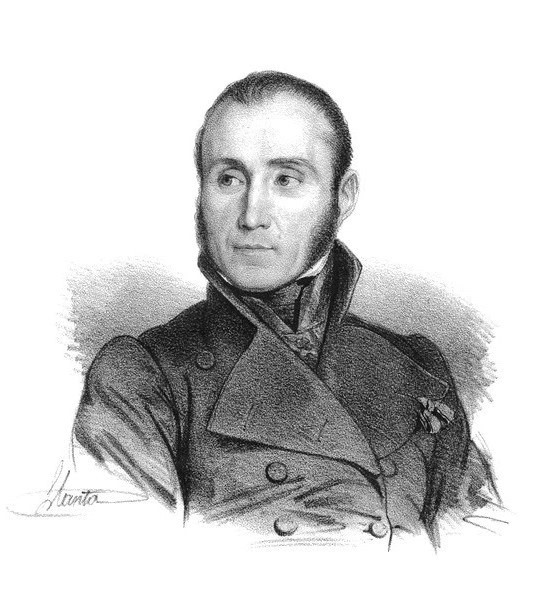
- Born: May 29, 1773; France
- Died: February 18, 1838 (aged 64)
- Occupation: Physician
- Known for: Founding a templar revivalist movement and the Johannite Church

Bernard-Raymond Fabré-Palaprat (29 May 1773 – 18 February 1838), was a former Catholic priest and mystic who founded a self-styled order called the Ordre du Temple, claiming direct descent from the original Knights Templar in 1804. He later founded the Johannite Church in 1812 and proclaimed himself Grand Master of the Templars and Sovereign Pontiff of the Primitive Catholic religion, opposing the Catholic Church.

== Early life ==
Bernard-Raymond Fabré-Palaprat was the son of surgeon Raymond Fabré and Jeanne Marie Palaprat, and nephew of a priest in the diocese of Cahor, born 29 May 1773. He studied at the diocesan seminary and was ordained a priest. Leaving the priesthood, he studied medicine in Montpellier and Caen, where he received his medical degree on 12 April 1798. Moving to Paris the same year, he obtained another medical degree on 16 September 1803, and became the director general of the Société médico-philantropique.

== Order of the Temple ==
On 4 November 1804 Fabré-Palaprat founded the Order of the Temple, a neo-Templar revivalist order, and revealed the existence of the Larmenius Charter (or "Charter of Transmission"). Knights of the Order were always addressed as "Sir Knights". The Grand Master of the Order was addressed as "Most Eminent Highness, Very Great, Powerful, and Excellent Prince, and Most Serene Lord."

The Larmenius Charter, allegedly written in Latin in 1324, listed 22 successive Grand Masters of the Knights Templar from 1324 to 1804, Fabré-Palaprat's name appearing last on the list. The Charter is named after Johannes Marcus Larmenius, the purported author of the document who, according to the Charter, was appointed Grand Master by Jacques de Molay while imprisoned, also having the power to appoint his successor (Thomas Theobaldus Alexandrinus in 1324; the first name on the list). The list of grand masters in the Larmenius Charter differs from the list of 'Scottish' Grand Masters given by the German Strict Observance, who produced no document, and the Larmenius Charter also anathematized the 'Scottish' Templars, who were excommunicated by Johannes Marcus Larmenius in 1324, who declared them "Deserters of The Temple".

Fabré-Palaprat's Order of the Temple claimed to possess significant relics: the sword of Jacques de Molay, the helmet of Guy Dauphin d'Auvergne, the Beausant, and four fragments of burnt bones taken from the funeral pyre where Jacques de Molay had been executed. These relics, described as "The Sacred Treasure of The Order of The Temple" in the Manual of the order (and described within an Inventory in the Statutes of the order), were displayed in March 1808 on the anniversary of Jacques de Molay's death, when members of the Order celebrated a public requiem for the 'martyred' Grand Master in the Church of St. Paul in Paris.

== Creation of the Johannite Church ==
In 1812 Fabré-Palaprat formed the Johannite Church, introducing faith-based elements into his order, opposing the Church of Saint Peter. He later ordained Ferdinand-François Châtel, a radical clergyman who left the priesthood following the July Revolution, as Primate of the Johannite church, on 4 May 1831. Châtel established his new French Catholic Church (Eglise Catholique Française) in former shop premises in Montmartre, decorating it with the bust of Louis Philippe I placed under the Tricolour flag. The Johannite church was located in a former bottle shop in the Cour des miracles, dubbed the "Apostolic Court of the Temple". The Order dated its documents from 'Magistropolis', a mystical calendar commencing from the foundation of the Knights Templar in 1118. Most of Fabré-Palaprat's Templars were Catholics, and did not follow him into his new church.

In 1831, following the July Revolution, Fabré-Palaprat published the Evangelikon, a Gnostic version of the Gospel of John that omits intra-textual commentary and the Resurrection narrative, preceded by an introduction and a commentary allegedly written by Nicephorus, a Greek monk of Athens, that carries the name Lévitikon. The Lévitikon contains an esoteric lineage from Jesus to the Knights Templar, and hints that Jesus was an initiate of the mysteries of Osiris, which were passed on to John the Beloved. Fabré-Palaprat claimed to have bought this vellum manuscript (allegedly dating from the 15th century), from a Paris second-hand bookstall on New Year's Day in 1814. These manuscripts were not created by Fabré-Palaprat, but likely dated to the 17th and 18th centuries; Fabré-Palaprat, however, believed they were genuinely ancient manuscripts.

Fabré-Palaprat introduced a Johannite Mass in 1834. The title "Christ" was reserved not just for Jesus but used for all leaders of the Johannite tradition who had attained Gnosis.

In 1836 a schism, led by the Duc de Choiseul resulted out of dissatisfaction with the new Johannite church that had replaced the previous chivalric-style order. Fabré-Palaprat responded by admitting Sir Sidney Smith to the Johannite church. The Duc de Choiseul was later elected Grand Master of the Order of the Temple in 1838, dying the same year.

== Later life and death ==
Fabré-Palaprat was awarded the Legion of Honour for his defence of Paris in 1814, and received the July Medal for his actions during the Three Glorious Days of the Revolution of 1830.

Following the collapse of the Johannite Church, he left Paris due to health issues and moved to Southern France, where he died 18 February 1838, at age 64.

== Legacy ==
Following Fabré-Palaprat's death, the British Admiral William Sidney-Smith, previously appointed by Fabré-Palaprat to be the Grand Prior for England, was chosen as a Grand Master by the two schismatic wings of the order, attempting to merge, but this did not last and both branches split for good.

== Selected works ==
- Lévitikon: ou Exposé des principes fondamentaux de la doctrine des chrétiens-catholiques-primitifs: suivi de leurs évangiles, d'un extrait de la Table d'or... et précédé du statut sur le gouvernement de l'Eglise et la hiérarchie lévitique (Paris: Librairie des Chrétiens-primitifs: J. Machault, 1831).
- Épître du souverain pontife et patriarche de la religion chrétienne catholique primitive (Paris: Ladvocat, 1831).
- De l'Église chrétienne-primitive et du catholicisme romain de nos jours, par une réunion d'ecclésiastiques (Paris: Houdaille, 1833).
- Jérusalem et Rome, débats entre les journalistes protecteurs du catholicisme romain de nos jours et les conservateurs du christianisme de l'Église primitive, pour faire suite au livre "De l'Église chrétienne-primitive" (Paris: Bureau central d'imprimerie et de librairie, 1834).
- Recherches historiques sur les Templiers et sur leurs croyances religieuses (Paris: Dentu, 1835).

== See also ==
- Jules Doinel
