= Jules Doinel =

French archivist (1842–1902)

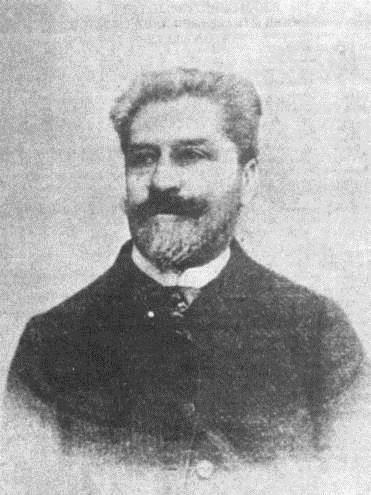
Jules Doinel

Jules-Benoît Stanislas Doinel du Val-Michel (8 December 1842 in Moulins, Allier – 16 or 17 March 1903), also known simply as Jules Doinel or Tau Valentin II was an archivist and the founder of the first Gnostic church in modern times who claims, that he was consecrated into a new episcopal lineage in a dream by the "Eon Jesus".

== Gnostic Church revival ==
After spiritual experiences in 1888–89, he proclaimed 1890 the beginning of "the era of Gnosis restored", Doinel assumed the office of Patriarch of the Église Gnostique (French for 'Gnostic Church'), taking the ecclesiastical name of Tau Valentin II, after Valentinius, the 2nd century Christian Gnostic teacher.

The doctrinal orientation of the church was based on extant Cathar documents, with the Gospel of John, and a strong influence of Simonian and Valentinian cosmology. The church was officially established in autumn 1890 in Paris, France. Liturgical services were based on Cathar rituals. Clergy were both male and female, having male bishops and female "sophias".

Doinel was "spiritually consecrated" in a spiritual experience in 1888 and not into a line of apostolic succession. Doinel subsequently consecrated a number of bishops for the Église Gnostique, notably Gérard Encausse, founder of the closely allied Martinist Order.

== Anti-masonic period (1895–1897) ==
In 1895, Doinel resigned from the Église Gnostique, leaving the leadership of the church to a council of bishops. He then converted to Roman Catholicism and began a collaboration with Léo Taxil, being one of many taken in by Taxil's anti-masonic hoax. Under the name Jean Kostka, Doinel wrote a book attacking freemasonry, entitled Lucifer Unmasked, in which he associated many of his prior activities with the diabolic. A. E. Waite described Lucifer Unmasked and revealed the real identity of its author in Devil Worship in France, his exposé of the anti-masonic movement that Taxil inspired. Taxil unveiled his hoax in 1897.

== Reconciliation ==
Doinel was readmitted as a bishop in the Église Gnostique in 1900.

== See also ==
- Marie Sinclair, Countess of Caithness
