= Johannite Church =

Church in France

The Johannite Church (full title: l'Église Johannite des Chrétiens Primitifs, “The Johannite Church of Primitive Christians”) was a Gnostic Christian denomination founded by the French priest Bernard-Raymond Fabré-Palaprat in 1804.

The Johannite Church received its full name in 1828 after Fabré-Palaprat's claimed discovery of the Levitikon gospels. It is termed "Johannite" because it claims continuity with the primitive Johannine Christianity of saints John the Baptist and John the Apostle, and other Christian scriptures attributed to John.

== See also ==
- Ordo Supremus Militaris Templi Hierosolymitani
- Self-styled order
