= Ecclesia Gnostica =

- Location: Los Angeles
- Country: United States
- Denomination: Christian Neo-Gnosticism
- Website: Ecclesia Gnostica

History
- Founded: 1959

Clergy
- Bishop: Stephan A. Hoeller

Ecclesia Gnostica (Latin: The Church of Gnosis) is a neo-Gnostic church based in the United States. It has ordained clergy and conducts regular sacramental services, including two weekly Masses (Celebration of the Holy Eucharist), as well as monthly and seasonal services in accordance with the liturgical calendar. It has active parishes in Seattle, Portland, Austin, and Los Angeles.

== History ==
The organisation now called the Ecclesia Gnostica was originally organised in England under the name the Pre-Nicene Gnostic Catholic Church in 1953, by the Most Rev. Richard Jean Chretien Duc de Palatine with the object of "restoring the Gnosis – Divine Wisdom to the Christian Church, and to teach the Path of Holiness which leads to God and the Inner Illumination and Interior Communion with the Soul through the mortal body of man." Born Ronald Powell, Richard Duc de Palatine had served in the Liberal Catholic Church in Australia, before moving to England. Bishop Duc de Palatine was consecrated by the Most Rev. Msg. Hugh George de Willmott Newman (Mar Georgius I), patriarch of the Catholic Apostolic Church (Catholicate of the West) who consolidated many lines of apostolic succession.

Bishop Duc de Palatine also received a charter in 1953 to head an organisation first called "the Brotherhood of the Illuminati," renamed "the Order of the Pleroma" in 1960. He received other esoteric lines and charters such as: the Templar Order, Brotherhood of the Rosy Cross, Memphis and Mizraim Rites of Freemasonry, and the Martiniste Order, and termed the combination with the Ecumenical Apostolic Succession "the Wisdom Religion-Gnostic Mystic Tradition."

In 1959 the organisation became active in the United States through the work of Stephan A. Hoeller, who served as a priest of the church in Los Angeles, and was subsequently consecrated bishop in 1967. He took the role of presiding bishop on the death of de Palatine in 1977. The two men had had a personal falling out prior.

=== The Ecumenical Apostolic Succession ===
Most Rev. Msg. Hugh George de Willmott Newman (Mar Georgius I) felt that all proper and valid consecrations and ordinations are equally efficacious regardless of the particular line of apostolic succession, but also that some degree of irregularity would attach itself to acts lacking ecumenical sanction. And so, to rectify any irregularity, and to overcome any doubts about validity of any line of apostolic succession, he sought and received conditional consecration from every part of the One Holy Catholic (Universal) and Apostolic church, bringing into being the Ecumenical Apostolic Succession. This Ecumenical line incorporates Syrian-Antiochene, Syrian-Malabar, Syrian-Gallican, Syro-Chaldean, Chaldean-Uniate, Coptic-Orthodox, Armenian-Uniate, Greek-Melkite, Russian-Orthodox, Russo-Syriac, Roman Catholic, Old Catholic, Liberal Catholic, Order of Corporate Reunion, Mariavite; and additional (disputed) lines of Anglican, Nonjuring, Celtic, Welsh, and Restored Apostolic (Irvingite).

All of these lines were passed to bishop Duc de Palatine at his consecration in 1953 and in a subsequent conditional consecration in 1955, then passed on to Hoeller in 1967.

== Organisation ==
=== Polity ===
The leaders of the church are Most Rev. Stephan A. Hoeller, Regionary Bishop, and Rt. Rev. Steven Marshall, Auxiliary Bishop.

=== Participation ===
The Ecclesia Gnostica has no formal, dues-paying membership; and its activities are open to all, regardless of creed.

=== Clergy ===
Holy orders are open to all genders and orientations. Clergy are self-sustaining, not receiving a salary from the church.

== Teachings and doctrinal orientation ==
Though Christianity based on Gnosis is unaligned with creed or acceptance from mainstream Christian churches, the Ecclesia Gnostica considers itself part of the fellowship of Universal Christendom, that is part of the One Holy Catholic (Universal) and Apostolic Church.

The Ecclesia Gnostica is a liturgical orthopraxy rather than an orthodoxy. Christian liturgy is central to the existence of the church, and in ritual and ornament the church is similar to Catholicism.

The church does not proselytise. There is not an exclusive claim of salvation; salvation is not dependent on participation in the church. Salvation is also understood differently from salvation in mainstream Christianity: salvation is achieved through Gnosis, described as "an inner 'knowingness,' a change of consciousness."

Gnosticism is grounded in the experience of Gnosis, which is the salvific and revelatory experience of transcendence. The experience of Gnosis receives expression in the Gnostic Mythology which allows the Gnostic to amplify and assimilate the experience of Gnosis and also makes further experience of Gnosis possible.

The focus is no single version or rendering of the Gnostic Mythos, but the entire heritage of the Gnostic tradition, which includes: primary sources such as the Nag Hammadi Library and much of the canonical Bible, with consideration of the less reliable accounts and recensions of teachings found in heresiological texts, the Hermetic writings, and the teachings of the Prophet Mani.

=== Understanding of the Gnostic tradition ===
While recognising the very pluralistic and creative elements of ancient Gnostic teachings they are seen as embracing a set of common assumptions which form the core of the Gnostic tradition. The "brief and inadequate outline" of this core given by bishop Hoeller is further summarised below:

There is an original and transcendental spiritual unity which came to emanate a vast manifestation of pluralities. The manifest universe of matter and mind (psyche) was created by spiritual beings possessing inferior powers, one of their objectives being continued separation of humans from the unity (God).

The human being is a composite, the outer aspect being the handiwork of the inferior creators, while the "inner man" has the character of a fallen spark of the ultimate divine unity. Though these sparks slumber in their material and mental prison, there is a constant effort directed toward their awakening and liberation from the unity. Particularly honored for such aid is the emanation called Sophia (Wisdom). The awakening of the inmost divine essence is effected by salvific knowledge, called Gnosis.

Messengers of light have been sent by the unity for the advancement of Gnosis in humans. The greatest of these messengers in our historical and geographical matrix was Jesus Christ. Jesus was a teacher, imparting instruction concerning the way of Gnosis, and he was a hierophant, imparting mysteries. These mysteries (sacraments) are mighty aids toward Gnosis entrusted by Jesus to his apostles and to their successors. By way of the spiritual practice of the mysteries (sacraments) and a relentless and uncompromising striving for Gnosis, humans can steadily advance toward liberation. The ultimate objective of this process of liberation is the achievement of salvific knowledge and with it freedom from embodied existence and return to the ultimate unity.

The church does not require the acceptance of these teachings as a matter of belief. Although it states, "it is obvious that these teachings represent the distinctive contribution of the Gnostic tradition to religious thought and persons functioning within the tradition would find themselves in general agreement with them."

== Worship and spiritual practice ==
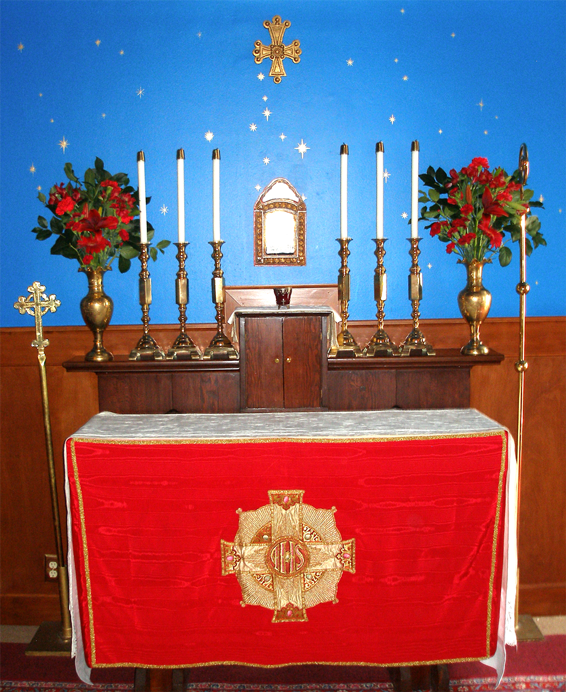
Ecclesia Gnostica (Gnostic Church) chapel in Los Angeles. Altar set up for a vespers service.

Ecclesia Gnostica services consist of different liturgical celebrations usually based on traditional Western forms of Christian liturgy. Like ancient Gnostic groups, the Ecclesia Gnostica blends several disparate traditions. The church performs its sacraments "in accordance with the tradition of the Ancient Mystery Schools" and attempts to present them "in their original meaning as archetypal acts of ceremonial communion with the timeless realities of the soul."

=== The Gnostic Holy Eucharist ===
The celebration of the Gnostic Holy Eucharist is offered every Sunday in Los Angeles (and most other parishes). The Eucharist is central to the practice of the church, and is celebrated with high formality as congregants prepare to commune with "the indwelling and cosmic Christ." The service resembles a Traditional Roman Catholic liturgy in style, complete with elaborate vestments, burning candles, incense, and bells.

The service contains the Post-Eucharistic Benediction, "The peace of God which passeth all understanding, go with you. There is a power that makes all things new: It lives and moves in those who know the Self as one. May that peace brood over you, that Power uplift you into the Light, may It keep your hearts and minds in the knowledge and Love of God, and of His Son, our Lord the Christ."

=== Other sacraments ===
The Ecclesia Gnostica recognises five initiatory sacraments as listed in the Gospel of Philip: Baptism, Chrism or Confirmation, Eucharist, Redemption (Consolamentum) and Bride-Chamber, with the additional two sustaining sacraments of Holy Orders and Anointing of the Sick. (The sacraments of Penance and Matrimony are considered to be secondary sacraments having been substituted for those of Redemption and Bride-Chamber.) The initiatory sacraments of Baptism and Chrism or Confirmation and the two sustaining sacraments are offered by the church.

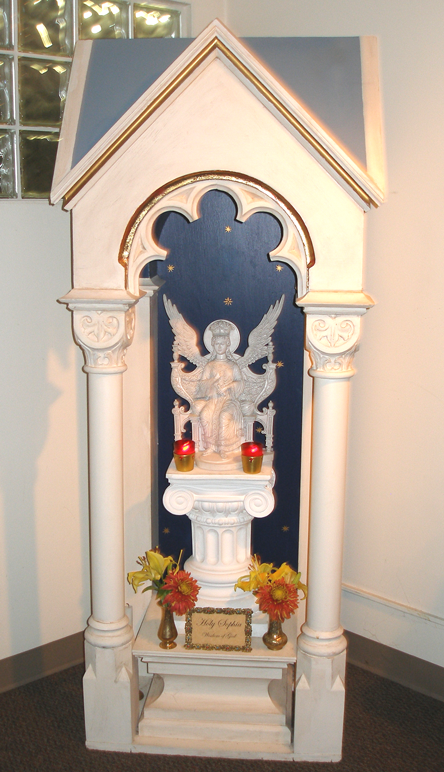
Statue of the Most Holy Sophia (with enclosure) in the Ecclesia Gnostica in Los Angeles.

=== Devotional service to the Holy Sophia ===
In addition to the forms of liturgical service in the tradition of the Christian church, there is also the devotional service to the Most Holy Sophia that is unique to the rite of the Ecclesia Gnostica.

=== Liturgical calendar and lectionary ===
The church follows the traditional Western liturgical calendar with additions and emendations. These changes include the addition of observances of Gnostic church fathers and martyrs of the Gnostic tradition, and the re-dedication of the Marian feasts of Assumption and Nativity to the Assumption and Descent of the Holy Sophia (without decrying traditional Marian devotion).

The Lectionary, the book of collects, lessons (instead of epistles), and gospels, of the church was written, edited, and collected by bishop Stephan A. Hoeller and issued in 1974. Scriptures were collected from the Old and New Testament; the Pistis Sophia and other scriptures known before the Nag Hammadi find; the Nag Hammadi Library of the Gospel of Thomas, Gospel of Truth, and Gospel of Phillip; Cathar, Hermetic, Manichean, and Mandaean sources; and the Chaldean Oracles.

== Active parishes ==
- Ecclesia Gnostica, Los Angeles, CA. Most Rev. Stephan Hoeller, Presiding Bishop.
- Queen of Heaven Gnostic Church, Portland, OR. Most Rev. Stephen Marshall, Bishop.
- Hagia Sophia Church, Seattle, WA. Rev. Sam Osborne, Priest and Rector.
- Ecclesia Gnostica, Austin, Texas, TX. Rev. Peter Reardon, Priest and Rector.
