= Violence and New Religious Movements =

2011 book by James R. Lewis

- Cover of the first edition
- Editor: James R. Lewis
- Language: English
- Publisher: Oxford University Press
- Publication date: April 6, 2011
- Publication place: United Kingdom/United States
- Pages: 443
- ISBN: 978-0-19-973561-7
- OCLC: 612347811
- Dewey Decimal: 200.086
- LC Class: BL65.V55 V55 2011

Violence and New Religious Movements is a 2011 edited volume. It was edited by sociologist James R. Lewis and published by Oxford University Press. Lewis' previous work had focused on new religious movements, and he had edited several books on the topic. Containing 19 articles by 22 academics, mostly sociologists or scholars in religious studies, it discusses the intersection between new religious movements and violence, both perpetrated by and against the groups. It is divided into five sections.

The book covers theoretical approaches to violence and NRMs at large, as well as individual chapters on as what the book classifies as the "big five" violent NRMs: the Peoples Temple, the Branch Davidians, the Order of the Solar Temple, Aum Shinrikyo, and Heaven's Gate. Other sections cover less studied movements associated with violence, like Rodnoverie or Ananda Marga, or groups that had certain commonalities with violent groups but did not actually escalate to large scale violence.

It received generally positive reviews from critics, with praise for its coverage of a variety of cases, including less studied and more obscure movements than the typical cases. The content of its individual chapters, as well as its usage of comparative analysis and new insights, was complimented. Its chapter on the Movement for the Restoration of the Ten Commandments of God was singled out for praise by several reviewers.

== Contents ==
In the introduction, Lewis gives a background of his own history with new religious movements; in the 1970s, he had been a member of the 3HO group, from which he eventually defected. He notes that many internal aspects of this organization were those deemed by analysts to be "essential" for a NRM to become violent – a millenarian outlook, charismatic leader, and totalistic social structure – however, the group did not become violent. Lewis focuses on how the typical criteria for analyzing which cults may or may not become violent are inadequate, and how several high-profile acts of violence related to NRMs in the 1990s affected the field and the theories as to what makes groups result to violence. He says that given the "relatively mature state of the literature", different discussions and analyses could now be had on the topic, including discussions of other groups than the "big five" and more specific types of violence, or violence against NRMs. He then summarizes the content of the five parts and their chapters.

The first part, "Theorizing NRM Violence", contains what Lewis describes as "general theory" chapters. Bromley explores the connection between NRMs and violence, continuing the theory of "dramatic denouements" he had explored in Cults, Religion and Violence; the theory of dramatic denouements is a four-stage process of conflict amplification, which Bromley argues NRMs are often predisposed to due to common radical elements. James T. Richardson analyzes NRM violence through a lens of conflict orientation and a presupposed context of violence regarding the groups from the dominant culture. Dick Anthony, Thomas Robbins, and Steven Barrie-Anthony discuss the conflict between new religious movements and the anti-cult movement, viewing it through the lens of Erik Erikson and Robert Jay Lifton's treatment of totalism; they argue that responding to group totalism with state totalism only fuels the fire.

Following this, "The "Big Five" (Plus One)" covers the "big five" violent NRMs – the Peoples Temple, the Branch Davidians, the Order of the Solar Temple, Aum Shinrikyo, and Heaven's Gate – the main groups that have been subject of scholarly discussion when it comes to the intersection of NRMs and violence, as well as the Movement for the Restoration of the Ten Commandments of God, a lesser known group which is sometimes considered along with the others. Rebecca Moore covers the Jonestown mass murder-suicides, giving a brief history of the group, before focusing primarily on the violence within the organization and the message they had intended through their act. Stuart A. Wright critiques the argument of the scholar Kenneth C. G. Newport about the Branch Davidians, who has argued that the group had committed mass suicide; Wright critiques the evidence he presented, further arguing that the whole debate is inextricably tied to political circumstances of the time, and a "Rorschach test for social actors", which tells one more about their views than the group itself. Bogdan surveys the varying hypotheses as to what led to the murder-suicides of the Solar Temple, a French-speaking organization less studied by the academic community than the other "big five", but that was the deadliest of them. Bogdan analyzes their status as a western esoteric group, and notes the criticism of the comparative analytical approach and an over-reliance on millennialism.

Following this, Martin Repp discusses Aum, following the internal history of the group in the context of the wider social environment of Japan. He agures that the term "religious violence" should be used cautiously, and that religious justifications were after the fact; the group's actions were best understood similar to other kinds of violence. Benjamin E. Zeller discusses Heaven's Gate, tracing the group's history and highlighting the contradiction between their earlier theology and their eventual mass suicide, arguing that in a "euphemization of violence" they had transformed the idea of suicide internally within the group. Finally, Jean-François Mayer, one of only a few westerners to directly investigate the case, presents his investigation into the Movement for the Restoration of the Ten Commandments of God; his theory, one he acknowledges is among many, is that they wanted fame and media recognition. "Select Religious Groups Involved in Violence" profiles other, less known groups that have committed violent acts. Peste discusses the Knutby murder in a small Swedish Pentecostal community, which he compares to NRM violence, though note its lack of one strong leader. Aitamurto discusses Rodnoverie, a Slavic neo-pagan faith, and its warrior elements, as well as its relation to xenophobia and extremism. Helen Crovetto covers Ananda Marga and its political wing, as well as the mass murder of several of its members and murder by several members, and its relation to the group's ideals of usage of force. E. Burke Rochford Jr. discusses ISKCON and the history of New Vrindaban and its controversies.

"Rhetorics of Violence and Peaceful Denouements" follows several NRMs whose actions resulted in discussions over the connection between cults and violence, but which did not actually become violent. The Nation of Islam, an African American Muslim NRM, is discussed by Martha F. Lee, who argues that though radical and controversial it did not engage in religiously motivated violence. Marion S. Goldman follows the violence that occurred in Rajneeshpuram; she explores Pierre Bourdieu’s cultural theories as it relates to the group and how their class dynamics affected their dynamics. 3HO is covered by Constance Elsberg who discusses the factors relevant to the group that may have prevented violence. Jesper Aagaard Petersen's chapter on Satanism follows up on his earlier works, analyzing the distinction between violent actors that use Satanism as a guise (i.e. neo-Nazis, serial killers) and symbolic violence common to Satanist groups. The fifth section, "Violence Against NRMs", covers the violence perpetrated against the Falun Gong group and the practice of deprogramming. James T. Richardson and Bryan Edelman discuss the Chinese state's hostility and usage of violence against the Falun Gong NRM. Anson Shupe discusses the controversy over deprogramming, a once common practice of forcible removal of members of NRMs from groups, which he harshly criticizes.

In an afterword, Lewis argues that violence within NRM groups is the result of a process of polarization, resulting from internal and external factors; however, this model fails to reliably predict such cases. Due to the variability of the NRM groups associated with violence, they must be discussed as a spectrum; Lewis encourages scholars to study more diverse arrays of groups to compensate for this. He disccuses how those tasked with responding to a possibly violent group may best respond to the crisis, and lays out possible directions for research to improve the field.

== Contributors ==
- Kaarina Aitamurto
- Dick Anthony
- Steven Barrie-Anthony
- Henrik Bogdan
- David G. Bromley
- Helen Crovetto
- Bryan Edelman
- Constance Elsberg
- Marion S. Goldman
- Martha F. Lee
- Jean-François Mayer
- Rebecca Moore
- Jonathan Peste
- Jesper Aagaard Petersen
- Martin Repp
- James T. Richardson
- Thomas Robbins
- E. Burke Rochford Jr.
- Anson Shupe
- Stuart A. Wright
- Benjamin E. Zeller

== Publication ==
Violence and New Religious Movements was published April 6, 2011 by Oxford University Press. Its editor, James R. Lewis, was an academic whose work focused on new religious movements, and who had edited several books on the topic. At the time of its publication, he was an associate professor at the University of Tromsø in Norway. Most contributors to the book are American, while the majority of the rest are Scandinavian; most are academics in sociology or religious studies.

== Reception ==
John Walliss called it an "excellent collection", and a "state of the art survey of the field", recommending it. Bernard Ineichen writing for the journal Mental Health, Religion & Culture in a review of multiple books, said the cases included in the book "present a rich stew of idealism, viciousness, petty meanness, and sheer stupidity." Asbjørn Dyrendal of Numen said it was a "good mix of new and old", with the best contributions being of old cases, especially from new angles. Walliss noted difficulties in studying the topic, as given that violent NRM incidents were rare comparative analysis was more difficult than in other fields; he praised the book for partially overcoming this with the inclusion of its last three sections of less studied movements. He said this, along with its inclusion of groups that did not commit violence, widened the debate on the issue, lending itself to better analysis. Former deprogrammer Joseph Szimhart, writing for the International Journal of Cultic Studies, the journal of the anti-cult organization ICSA, called the book "highly nuanced" but also "sketchy".

Ineichen complimented the third chapter by Robbins, Anthony, and Barrie-Anthony and the chapter by Shupe as "excellent" in their usage of psychological insights, but said "much more could be done". He noted that despite its title, many of the connections of the groups included to violence was "marginal". Dyrendal praised Wright's chapter as arguing well, saying his chapter showed a need for interdisciplinary approaches in understanding groups like the Branch Davidians. Dyrendal said he was ambivalent towards the work's discussion on non-physical violence, as it could conflate speech with physical violence, though he said Petersen's analysis of Satanism managed this better than Robbins, Anthony, or Richardson's chapters. A reviewer for the International Journal for the Study of New Religions said the book had a "clear structure" and it succeeded in analyzing the "general; model" of NRM violence as well as more obscure groups. The reviewer praised it as "timely" and "well-structured"; comparing it to the 2002 book Cults, Religion and Violence (which she described as the first attempt to analyze the NRM-violence relationship), she said Violence and New Religious Movements succeeded in proposing new insights into this topic.

Szimhart said a prospective reader would come away understanding that "to understand an NRM, per se, one must view it as a dynamic". He said Lewis's view of the anti-cult movement, followed by most of the authors in the book, was "narrow", but that in his view many other writers in the volume escaped this view; he wished that the book had included scholars such as Janja Lalich, Benjamin Zablocki, and Stephen A. Kent to provide more contrasting voices to the volume. Szimhart argued that Robbins, Anthony, and Barrie-Anthony minimized the responsibility that NRMs had, but that he agreed with their point that law enforcement and anti-cult overreaction in some cases could make things worse, as with the Branch Davidians. He noted the second section as "enlightening" in its "consideration of underlying nuances that cult critics often overlook". He however extensively criticized Shupe's chapter in specific, arguing that it contained "provocative use of atrocity tales" and "errors in fact".

Mayer's chapter on the "Plus One" the MRTC was singled out for praise by several reviewers. Walliss noted that the group had received little study compared to the other groups, and that this was a "welcome addition to the collection and will hopefully inspire further comparative work." Ineichen said he had done an "admirable job" in creating a comprehensive account of the group's activities; Dyrendal praised what he viewed as "good scholarship" on the part of Mayer in weighing the different arguments as to what occurred with the group, though he said this did not lead Mayer to "any firm conclusion", but that his offered conclusion was "possible and plausible" but with room for additional research and disagreement.
