= Misunderstanding Cults =

Book by Benjamin Zablocki and Thomas Robbins

- Book cover
- Editors: Benjamin Zablocki; Thomas Robbins
- Language: English
- Subject: Cults
- Publisher: University of Toronto Press
- Publication date: December 1, 2001
- Publication place: Canada
- Pages: 496
- ISBN: 0-8020-8188-6
- OCLC: 50387243
- Dewey Decimal: 306.6 21
- LC Class: BP603 .M575 2001

Misunderstanding Cults: Searching for Objectivity in a Controversial Field is an edited volume discussing various topics related to cults, including the scholarly field itself, the concept of brainwashing, and the public perception of the groups. The book was edited by Benjamin Zablocki and Thomas Robbins, and was published by University of Toronto Press on December 1, 2001. It includes contributions from 12 religious, sociological, and psychological scholars, in 14 essays.

The book includes contributions from scholars who have been labeled as "anti-cult", as well as those who have been labelled as "cult apologists". Other topics discussed include cult violence, the conflict that exists between new religious movements and their critics, and the ramifications of raising children in controversial religious movements.

The book received a generally positive reception, with praise for the quality of ideas expressed and its summarization of the controversial debate over cult research. Some reviewers criticized the book's organizational structure, as well as noting the book's chapters were reflective of the hostile debate around scholarly research into new religious movements and the quality of the research on sociology of religion more broadly.

== Background ==
The academic study of new religious movements has been noted to be unusually hostile, with scholars holding strong opinions as to the influence of cults on society. A 1998 article in the magazine Lingua Franca reported on the acrimony of the scholarly debate on the topic; in the "cult-anticult debate", scholars have been described as exhibiting a "toxic level" of suspicion toward others who research cults. The study often divided into two groups, which throughout the scholarly history of the topic developed very different opinions on issues like brainwashing, sexuality, violence, conflict, and apostates within the groups.

The two editors, Benjamin Zablocki and Thomas Robbins, are opposed on this topic, and state that their primary goal with the book is to restore a "moderate perspective" to cultic studies and encourage dialogue between the two camps. The book was controversial even prior to its publishing, with several prospective writers who had signed on withdrawing.

== Contents ==
The book is made up of 14 essays in 13 chapters, with 12 authors. Contributors to the book include Dick Anthony, Benjamin Beit-Hallahmi, David Bromley, Lorne L. Dawson, Jeffrey Kaplan, Stephen A. Kent, Janja Lalich, Susan J. Palmer, Thomas Robbins, Julius H. Rubin, Amy B. Siskind, and Benjamin Zablocki. The book's introduction, written by Zablocki and Robbins, splits the writers between two camps, described as "cult bashers" and "cult apologists". The introduction also debates why the cult research field has become especially toxic, arguing that the "cult bashers" tend to be focused on individual cases of oppression of individuals, while the "apologists" tend to be focused on broader issues of repression by governments, which overlap in the coverage of specific cults or groups.

The book is focused on three primary aspects of the debate around cults, and is divided into three parts: "How objective are the scholars?", "How constrained are the participants?", and "How concerned should society be?", which discuss the scholarly motivations of those who study cults, the validity of the concept of brainwashing, and the public reaction to the groups, respectively. The essays are isolated, with only one case (between Kent and Dawson) of a rejoinder.

Benjamin Zablocki argues in the book that the social sciences have falsely disregarded the concept of brainwashing, which in his view is legitimate and based in the literature; Dick Anthony, however, argues that the concept of brainwashing is a pseudoscientific concept created (and refuted) by the CIA. Several writers in the book debate the ambiguity of the terms used. Writers in the book define "cult" variously, with Zablocki and Robbins describing a cult as a controversial social movement likely to be called a new religious movement, though others such as Lalich and Siskind define it more broadly; Lalich specifically does not necessarily define a cult as religious and applies the term to a Marxist-Leninist organization of which she had previously been a member.

Beit-Hallahmi's chapter argues that most cult scholars are "collaborationists", bought off by the groups they aim to study, who unfairly advocate for new religious movements. He criticizes scholars for always assuming those groups to be innocent and oppressed, and argues that the depth of the violence in these groups is not properly analyzed until tragedy has already occurred, and that it is important to be vigilant. Palmer's chapter personally discusses her history with observing NRMs. David Bromley argues that the cult debate itself may not be able to be resolved through empirical means, and that the debate itself is closer to a political one.

== Reception ==
The book's general reception was mixed to positive; the quality and articulation of the ideas expressed was complimented. William Sims Bainbridge, writing for the Canadian Journal of Sociology Online, complimented the chapters written by Anthony and Palmer, describing the former as the one with the most basis in established literature, and describing the latter as "refreshingly honest" in its discussion of how researchers who study cults closely may become too personally involved. He compared the work of Palmer to the work of the "anti-cult" writers in the volume, criticizing several writers as having seemingly never conducted any direct research with cults at all, merely consulting former members who may be exaggerating. In Utopian Studies, Mike Tyldesley complimented the book as describing the state of the debate on cults in an accessible way, though believed that the lack of rejoinders in most cases reduced the quality of the book. He also wrote that "[w]hether the book will help to overcome the suspicion and help the scholars whose starting points are different to start to move on from the acrimonious debates of the past must be open to doubt".

Its goal of reaching balance between the two camps was generally regarded as unsuccessful. Anson Shupe described the essays in the book as "clearly written" and "articulate", though "not terribly original". He believed that the book failed to achieve a middle ground as it had intended, and included little if any dialogue between the two camps, describing the writers as "preaching to their respective choirs". James T. Richardson described the book as a "mixed bag", containing what he described as "fine analytical work", but also work with "limitations of one sort of another". He felt that the book's disputes from before it had been published, which had led several writers to withdraw from the project (including himself), left it tilted towards the "anti-cult" camp. In the American Journal of Sociology, Karla Poewe commented that the book failed to achieve its stated goal of encouraging balance between important research objectives. Dana Kaplan, writing for the Journal for the Scientific Study of Religion, praised the book as containing a "wealth of information on how scholars study cults or new religious movements", however arguing that the book had failed in its goal to restore a moderate voice to the debate, with the book itself containing a disclaimer warning the reader that they will have issues with at least one of the essays presented, and containing "highly charged material".

"Ultimately, parts of it may be analogous to the 1994 The Bell Curve volume by Charles Murray and Richard Herrnstein on race and intelligence that gave some temporary solace to right-wing social conservatives. This book will not settle the polemics discussed for dissenting social scientists and likely will convince no one suspicious of the anticult movement's agenda, but it does have some good material."

— Anson Shupe, Contemporary Sociology

The discussion of brainwashing in the book attracted both praise and criticism. Shupe described Bromley, Robbins, and Anthony's chapters as the best, and argued some of the book's coverage of brainwashing was an example of a minority of scholars attempting to revive a debate which in his view had been already settled by sociologists; in this way he compared the book to The Bell Curve about race and intelligence. Richardson criticized Zablocki's defense of the brainwashing concept, describing it as "a rather selective reading of the literature", and described his defense over his usage of ex-member data as over-reaching; he praised Anthony's chapter as doing a "thorough job" of disputing this. However, Poewe criticized Anthony's chapter disputing the concept of brainwashing as "unreasonably long and ideological", describing it as an attack on Zablocki's chapter discussing brainwashing and comparing Anthony's argument to that of the Nazis, describing Anthony's usage of psychoanalysis as "at least as 'pseudoscientific' as Anthony claims Zablocki's concept of 'brainwashing' is". Poewe stated that the "unifying theme underlying all confusions is [...] the politicization of research by scholars who are explicit or implicit ideologues."

The book's organizational structure was questioned by some commentators. Marion S. Goldman argued that the book should have included a timeline of major cult controversies, as in her view this information was presented without contextualization, though concluded by describing the book as "an important collection" that opened the door for future research. Dana Kaplan said that the volume was organized in an uneven manner with chapters of varying quality, which to her indicated that "the editors were a bit at a loss on how to divide up the material". Dana Kaplan points out the third section as one which seemed to have been "tacked on almost as an afterthought", not fully answering the question it set out to ask, and calls Jeffrey Kaplan's chapter misplaced in the book and a poor choice for the final essay, though Richardson described the final chapter as "succinct and balanced".

The data behind its writer's arguments was criticized. Bainbridge frames the book as raising the question as to whether the sociology of religion is truly scientific. He writes that "[i]n many respects this is an excellent book, containing insightful essays written from a variety of perspectives," noting however that "[n]ot a single paper in the collection makes use of quantitative data or conducts any other kind of formal theory testing", decrying the scarcity of connections to research on group influence from social psychology or sociology in general. He concluded that "[t]his rather good book demonstrates the very bad condition of the social science of religion." Goldman expressed that she wished the book had had a final chapter which had compared the various contributors' arguments and had better summarized the methodologies and empirical evidence used by the writers in the book, so readers could independently evaluate these arguments.

"It is a telling fact that several of the more polite writers refer to their colleagues as scholars rather than scientists, the implication being that they all operate outside any framework of precise measurement and hypothesis testing."

— William Sims Bainbridge, Canadian Journal of Sociology Online

Misunderstanding Cults' tone was noted to reflect the broader hostility of the academic study of cults. Bainbridge noted the acerbic tone of many writers in the book toward those on the opposite side of the debate, with "each faction accusing the other of selling out and forsaking intellectual integrity for material gain". Richardson argued the book was revealing about the study of cults, with "some very strong statements [...] being made about fellow scholars, some of who are also included in the book!" He further argued that the introduction itself made the divisions worse, with those cited as "moderates" in the debate not having a voice in the literature.
