= Marshall Applewhite =

American religious leader (1931–1997)

- Applewhite in 1974
- Born: Marshall Herff Applewhite Jr. May 17, 1931; Spur, Texas, U.S.
- Died: March 24, 1997 (aged 65); Rancho Santa Fe, California, U.S.
- Cause of death: Suicide by suffocation
- Body discovered: March 26, 1997
- Other names: Do, Bo, Tiddly, Nincom, Guinea
- Education: Austin College (BA); University of Colorado Boulder (MA)
- Known for: Founder of Heaven's Gate
- Spouse: Ann Pearce (m. 1952; div. 1968)
- Children: 2

Marshall Herff Applewhite Jr. (May 17, 1931 – March 24, 1997), also known as Do, (Note: The name "Do" was pronounced /doʊ/. (Lalich, Bounded Choice 2004, p. 25)) among other names, (Note: Other names used by Applewhite include "Guinea", "Tiddly", and "Nincom". (Urban 2000, p. 276) Occasionally, he was simply referred to by male pronouns. (Peters 2003, p. 249)) was an American religious leader who founded and led the Heaven's Gate new religious movement (often described as a cult), and organized their mass suicide in 1997. The suicide is the largest mass suicide to occur inside the United States. (Note: While the People's Temple led by Jim Jones was based in the United States, the mass murder-suicide at Jonestown occurred in Guyana.)

As a young man, Applewhite attended several universities and served in the United States Army. He initially pursued a career in education until he resigned from the University of St. Thomas in Houston, Texas, in 1970 after an inappropriate relationship with a male student. His father's death a year later brought on severe depression. In 1972, Applewhite developed a close friendship with Bonnie Nettles, a nurse; together, they discussed mysticism at length and concluded that they were called as divine messengers. They operated a bookstore and teaching center for a short while and then began to travel around the U.S. in 1973 to spread their views. They gained only one convert. In August 1974, Applewhite was arrested in Harlingen, Texas, for failing to return a rental car and was extradited to Missouri where he was subsequently jailed for six months. In jail, he further developed his theology.

After Applewhite's release, he and Nettles travelled to California and Oregon, eventually gaining a group of committed "students." They told their followers that they would be visited by extraterrestrials who would provide them with new bodies. Applewhite initially stated that he and his followers would physically ascend to a spaceship, where their bodies would be transformed, but later he came to believe that their bodies were the mere "human vehicles," or containers of their souls, which would later be placed into new bodies. These ideas were expressed with language drawn from Christian eschatology, the New Age movement and American popular culture.

Heaven's Gate received an influx of funds in the late 1970s, which it used to pay housing and other expenses. In 1985, Nettles died, leaving Applewhite distraught and challenging his views on physical ascension. In the early 1990s, the group took more steps to publicize their theology. In 1996, they learned of the approach of Comet Hale–Bopp and rumors of an accompanying spaceship, concluding that this was the vessel that would take their spirits on board for a journey to another planet. Believing that their souls would ascend to the spaceship and be given new bodies, the group members committed mass suicide in a rented mansion. A media circus followed the discovery of their bodies. In the aftermath, commentators and academics discussed how Applewhite persuaded people to follow his commands, including suicide. Some commentators attributed his followers' willingness to commit suicide to his skill as a manipulator, while others argued that their willingness was due to their faith in the narrative that he constructed.

== Early life and education ==
Marshall Herff Applewhite Jr. was born in Spur, Texas, on May 17, 1931, to Marshall Herff Applewhite Sr. and his wife Louise (née Winfield). He had three siblings. The son of a Presbyterian minister, Applewhite became very religious as a child.

Applewhite attended Corpus Christi High School and Austin College; at the latter school, he was active in several student organizations and was moderately religious. He earned a bachelor's degree in philosophy in 1952 and subsequently enrolled at Union Presbyterian Seminary to study theology, hoping to become a minister. He married Anne Pearce around that time, and they later had two children, Mark and Lane. Early in his seminary studies, Applewhite decided to leave the school to pursue a career in music, becoming the music director of a Presbyterian church in North Carolina. He was a baritone singer and enjoyed spirituals and the music of Handel.

In 1954, Applewhite was drafted by the United States Army and served in Austria and New Mexico as a member of the Army Signal Corps. He left the military in 1956 and enrolled at the University of Colorado Boulder, where he earned a master's degree in music and focused on musical theater.

== Career ==
Applewhite moved to New York City in an unsuccessful attempt to begin a professional singing career upon finishing his education in Colorado. He then taught at the University of Alabama (UA). Applewhite lost his position there after pursuing a sexual relationship with a male student; society was not supportive of same-sex relationships and he was subsequently frustrated by his sexual desires. He separated from his wife when she learned of the affair in 1965, and they divorced three years later. When Applewhite revealed to his parents that he was homosexual, his father rejected him.

In 1965, after leaving UA, Applewhite moved to Houston to serve as chair of the music department at the University of St. Thomas. His students regarded him as an engaging speaker and a stylish dresser. He also became a locally popular singer, serving as the choral director of an Episcopal church and performing with the Houston Grand Opera. In Houston, Applewhite was briefly openly gay but also pursued a relationship with a young woman, who left him under pressure from her family; he was greatly upset by this outcome. He resigned from the University of St. Thomas in 1970, citing depression and other emotional problems. Robert Balch and David Taylor, sociologists who studied Applewhite's group, speculate that this departure was prompted by another affair between Applewhite and a student. The president of the university later recalled that Applewhite was often mentally jumbled and disorganized near the end of his employment.

In 1971, Applewhite briefly moved to New Mexico, where he operated a delicatessen. He was popular with customers but decided to return to Texas later that year. Applewhite's father died around that time; the loss took a significant emotional toll on him, causing severe depression. His debts mounted, leading him to borrow money from friends.

== Introduction to Nettles and first travels ==
In 1972, Applewhite met Bonnie Nettles, a nurse with an interest in Theosophy and Biblical prophecy. (Note: The circumstances of Applewhite's introduction to Nettles are unclear: their meeting has been variously attributed to his seeking of treatment at a hospital, (Lewis 2003, p. 111) visitation of a friend receiving treatment, (Zeller 2006, p. 77) or teaching of Nettles' son. (Bearak 1997) Applewhite recorded few details about their meeting. (Daniels 1999, p. 206)) The two quickly became close friends; he later recalled that he felt like he had known her for a long time and concluded that they had met in a past life. Nettles told Applewhite their meeting had been foretold to her by extraterrestrials, persuading him that he had a divine assignment. By that time, he had begun to investigate alternatives to traditional Christian doctrine, including astrology.

Applewhite soon began to live with Nettles full-time. Although they cohabited, their relationship was not a sexual one, fulfilling his longtime wish to have a deep and loving, yet platonic, relationship. Nettles was married with four children, but after she became close with Applewhite, her husband divorced her and she lost custody of the children. Applewhite permanently broke off contact with his family as well. He saw Nettles as his soulmate, and some of his acquaintances later recalled that she had a strong influence on him. Raine writes that Nettles "was responsible for reinforcing his emerging delusional beliefs", but psychiatrist Robert Jay Lifton speculates that Nettles' influence helped him avoid further psychological deterioration.

Applewhite and Nettles opened a bookstore known as the Christian Arts Center, which carried books from a variety of spiritual backgrounds. They also launched a venture known as Know Place to teach classes on theosophy and mysticism. The pair closed these businesses a short time later. In February 1973, Applewhite and Nettles resolved to travel to teach others about their beliefs and drove throughout the Western U.S.; Lifton describes their travels as a "restless, intense, often confused, peripatetic spiritual journey". While traveling, they had little money and occasionally resorted to selling their blood or working odd jobs for much-needed funds. The pair subsisted solely on bread rolls at times, often camped out, and sometimes did not pay their lodging bills. One of their friends from Houston corresponded with them and accepted their teachings. They visited her in May 1974, and she became their first convert.

While traveling, Applewhite and Nettles pondered the life of Francis of Assisi and read works by authors including Helena Blavatsky, R. D. Laing, and Richard Bach. They kept a King James Version of the Bible with them and studied several passages from the New Testament, focusing on teachings about Christology, asceticism, and eschatology. Applewhite also read science fiction, including works by Robert A. Heinlein and Arthur C. Clarke. By June 1974, Applewhite and Nettles' beliefs had solidified into a basic outline. They concluded that they had been chosen to fulfill biblical prophecies, and that they had been given higher-level minds than other people. They wrote a pamphlet that described Jesus' reincarnation as a Texan, a thinly veiled reference to Applewhite. Furthermore, they concluded that they were the two witnesses described in the Book of Revelation and occasionally visited churches or other spiritual groups to speak of their identities, often referring to themselves as "The Two", or "The UFO Two". The pair believed that they would be killed and then restored to life and, in view of others, transported onto a spaceship. This event, which they referred to as "the Demonstration", was to prove their claims. To their dismay, these ideas were poorly received.

== Arrest and proselytism ==
In August 1974, Applewhite was arrested in Harlingen, Texas, for failing to return a car that he had rented in Missouri. He was extradited to St. Louis and jailed for six months. At the time, Applewhite maintained that he had been "divinely authorized" to keep the car. While jailed, he pondered theology and subsequently abandoned discussion of occult topics in favor of extraterrestrials and evolution.

After Applewhite's release, Nettles and he resolved to contact extraterrestrials and began seeking like-minded followers. They published advertisements for meetings, where they recruited disciples, whom they called "crew". At these events, they purported to represent beings from another planet, the Next Level, who sought participants for an experiment. They claimed that those who agreed to take part in the experiment would be brought to a higher evolutionary level. Nettles and Applewhite referred to themselves as "Guinea" and "Pig". Applewhite described his role as a "lab instructor" and served as the primary speaker, while Nettles occasionally interjected clarifying remarks or corrections. The two seldom personally spoke with attendees, only taking phone numbers with which they could contact them. They initially named their organization the Anonymous Sexaholics Celibate Church, but it soon became known as the Human Individual Metamorphosis.

Applewhite believed in the ancient astronaut hypothesis, which claimed that extraterrestrials had visited humanity in the past and placed humans on Earth and would return to collect a select few. Parts of this teaching bear similarities to the Reformed Christian concept of election, likely owing to Applewhite's Presbyterian upbringing.

Applewhite and Nettles sent advertisements to groups in California and were invited to speak to New Age devotees there in April 1975. At this meeting, they persuaded about half of the 50 attendees to follow them. They also focused on college campuses, speaking at Cañada College in August. At a meeting in Waldport, Oregon in September 1975, they had further recruitment success—about 30 people left their homes to follow the pair, prompting interest from media outlets. The coverage was negative; commentators and some former members mocked the group and leveled accusations of brainwashing against Applewhite and Nettles. Balch and Taylor state that Applewhite and Nettles eschewed pressure tactics, seeking only devoted followers.

Benjamin E. Zeller, an academic who studies new religions, notes that Applewhite and Nettles' teachings focused on salvation through individual growth and sees this as similar to currents in the era's New Age movement. Likewise, the importance of personal choice was also emphasized. Applewhite and Nettles denied connection with the New Age movement, viewing it as a human creation. Janja Lalich, a sociologist who studies cults, attributes their recruitment success to their eclectic mix of beliefs and the way that they deviated from typical New Age teachings: discussing literal spaceships while retaining familiar language. Most of their disciples were young and interested in occultism or otherwise lived outside of mainstream society. They came from a variety of religious backgrounds, including Eastern religions and Scientology. Most were well versed in New Age teachings, allowing Applewhite and Nettles to convert them easily. Applewhite thought that his followers would reach a higher level of being, changing like a caterpillar becoming a butterfly; this example was used in almost all of the group's early literature. He contended that this would be a "biological change into a different species, casting his teachings as scientific truth in line with secular naturalism." He emphasized to his early followers that he was not speaking metaphorically, often using the words "biology" and "chemistry" in his statements. By the mid-1970s, Applewhite attempted to avoid the use of the term "religion", seeing it as inferior to science.

== Nomadic lifestyle ==
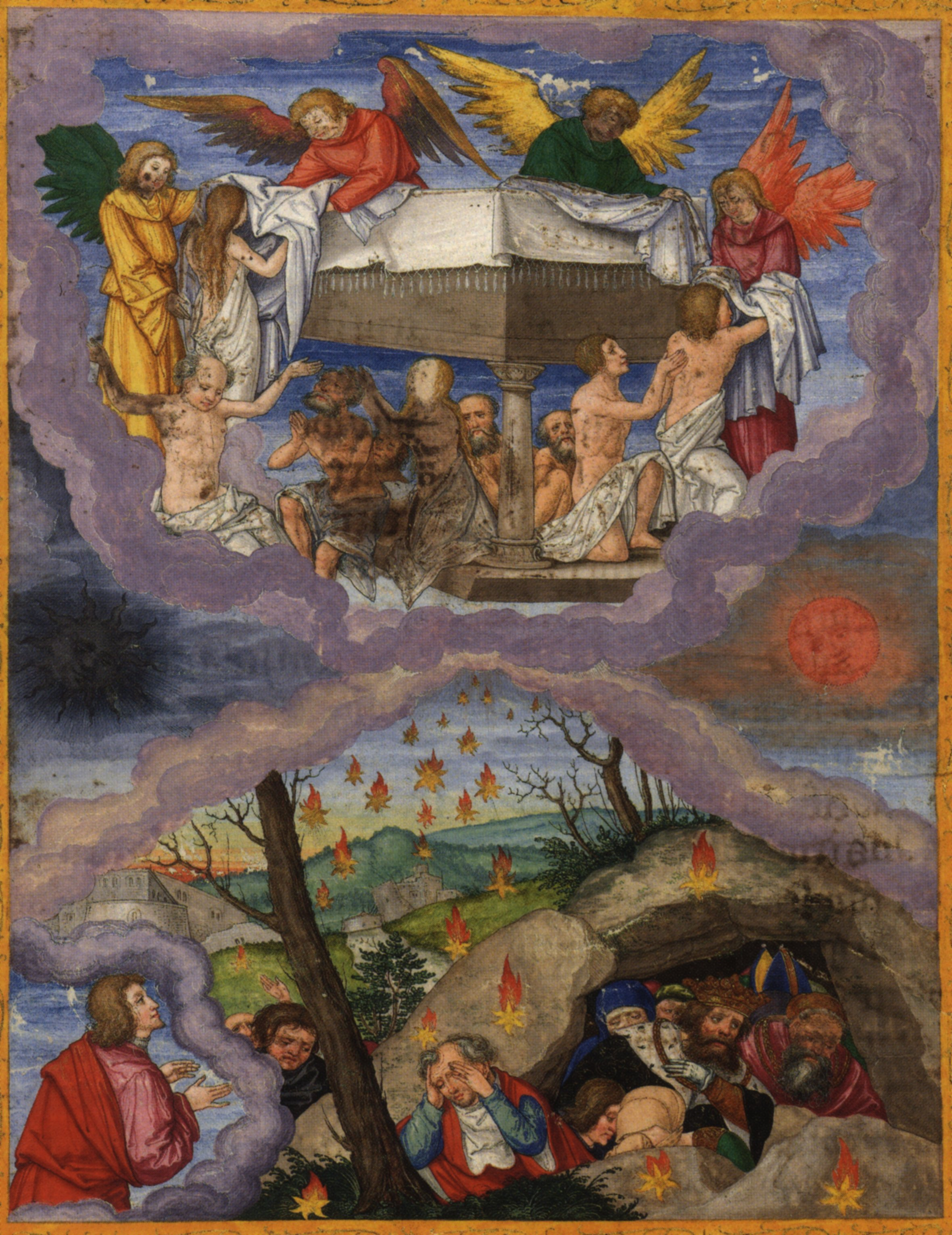
A depiction of a scene from the Book of Revelation, which Applewhite believed described interactions between humans and extraterrestrials

By 1975, Applewhite and Nettles had taken the names "Bo" and "Peep". They had about 70 followers and saw themselves as shepherds tending a flock. Applewhite believed that complete separation from earthly desires was a prerequisite of ascension to the Next Level and emphasized passages in the New Testament in which Jesus spoke about forsaking worldly attachments. Members were consequently instructed to renounce: friends, family, media, drugs, alcohol, jewelry, facial hair, and sexuality. Furthermore, they were at first required to adopt biblical names. Applewhite and Nettles soon told them to adopt two-syllable names that ended in "ody" and had three consonants in the first syllable, such as Rkkody, Jmmody, and Lvvody; Applewhite stated that these names emphasized that his followers were spiritual children, and these names separated them from the life of their "human vehicles." He, Nettles, and their followers lived what religious scholar James Lewis describes as a "quasi-nomadic lifestyle". They usually stayed at remote campgrounds and did not speak about their beliefs. Applewhite and Nettles ceased having public meetings in April 1975, and spent little time teaching doctrine to their converts. The pair also had little contact with their dispersed followers, many of whom renounced their allegiance.

Applewhite and Nettles feared that they would be assassinated, and taught their followers that their deaths would be similar to those of the two witnesses of the Book of Revelation. (Note: Revelation 11:7–12: "And when they shall have finished their testimony, the beast that ascendeth out of the bottomless pit shall make war against them, and shall overcome them, and kill them. And their dead bodies shall lie in the street of the great city, which spiritually is called Sodom and Egypt, where also our Lord was crucified. And they of the people and kindreds and tongues and nations shall see their dead bodies three days and an half, and shall not suffer their dead bodies to be put in graves. And they that dwell upon the earth shall rejoice over them, and make merry, and shall send gifts one to another; because these two prophets tormented them that dwelt on the earth. And after three days and an half the spirit of life from God entered into them, and they stood upon their feet; and great fear fell upon them which saw them. And they heard a great voice from heaven saying unto them, Come up hither. And they ascended up to heaven in a cloud; and their enemies beheld them." (KJV)) Balch and Taylor believe that Applewhite's prison experience and early rejection by audiences contributed to this fear. Applewhite and Nettles later explained to their followers that the former's treatment by the press was a form of assassination and had fulfilled their prophecy. Applewhite took a materialistic view of the Bible, seeing it as a record of extraterrestrial contact with humanity. He drew heavily from the Book of Revelation, although he avoided traditional theological terminology and took a somewhat negative tone towards Christianity. He only lectured about a small number of verses and never tried to develop a system of theology.

By early 1976, Applewhite and Nettles had settled on the names "Do" and "Ti"; Applewhite stated that these were meaningless names. In June 1976, they gathered their remaining followers at Medicine Bow–Routt National Forest in southeastern Wyoming, promising a UFO visit. Nettles later announced that the visit had been cancelled. Applewhite and Nettles then split their followers into small groups, which they referred to as "Star Clusters".

From 1976 to 1979, the group lived in campgrounds, usually in the Rocky Mountains or Texas. Applewhite and Nettles began to place greater demands on their followers' heretofore loosely structured lives, which improved membership retention. They typically communicated with their disciples in writing or through assistants. Increasingly, they emphasized that they were the only source of truth—the idea that members could receive individual revelations was rejected in an attempt to prevent schisms. Applewhite also sought to prevent close friendships among his followers, fearing that this could lead to insubordination. He and Nettles insisted that their followers practice what they referred to as "flexibility": strict obedience to their often shifting requests. The two leaders limited the group's contacts with those outside the movement, even some who may have been interested in joining, ostensibly to prevent infiltration from hostile parties. In practice, this made their followers completely dependent upon them. Applewhite instructed his disciples to be like children or pets in their submission—their sole responsibility was to obey their leaders. Members were encouraged to constantly seek Applewhite's advice and often ask themselves what their leaders would do when making a decision. To his followers, he did not seem dictatorial; many of them found him laid back and fatherly. In his 2000 study of the group, Winston Davis states that Applewhite mastered the "fine art of religious entertainment", noting that many of his disciples seemed to enjoy their service. Applewhite organized seemingly arbitrary rituals that were intended to instill a sense of discipline in his followers; he referred to these tasks as "games". He also watched science fiction television programs with the rest of the group. Rather than issue direct commands, he attempted to express his preferences and nominally offer his disciples a choice. He emphasized that students were free to disobey if they chose, in what Lalich dubs the "illusion of choice".

== Housing and control ==
In the late 1970s, the group received a large sum of money, possibly an inheritance of a member or donations of followers' income. This capital was used to rent houses, initially in Denver and later in Dallas. Applewhite and Nettles had about 40 followers then and lived in two or three houses; the leaders usually had their own house. The group was secretive about their lifestyle, covering their windows. Applewhite and Nettles arranged their followers' lifestyles as a boot camp that would prepare them for the Next Level. Referring to their house as a "craft", they regimented the lives of their disciples down to the minute. Students who were not committed to this lifestyle were encouraged to leave; departing members were given financial assistance. Lifton states that Applewhite wanted "quality over quantity" in his followers, although he occasionally spoke about gaining many converts.

Applewhite and Nettles sometimes made sudden, drastic changes to the group. On one occasion in Texas, they told their followers of a forthcoming visitation from extraterrestrials and instructed them to wait outside all night, at which point they informed them that this had been merely a test. Lalich sees this as a way that they increased their students' devotion, ensuring that their commitment became irrespective of what they saw. Members became desperate for Applewhite's approval, which he used to control them.

In 1980, Applewhite and Nettles had about 80 followers, many of whom held jobs, often working with computers or as car mechanics. In 1982, the pair allowed their disciples to call their families. They further relaxed their control in 1983, permitting their followers to visit relatives on Mother's Day. They were only allowed short stays and were instructed to tell their families that they were studying computers at a monastery. These vacations were intended to placate families by demonstrating that the disciples remained with the group of their own accord.

== Nettles' death ==
In 1983, Nettles had an eye surgically removed as a result of cancer diagnosed several years earlier. While she lived for two more years, dying in 1985, Applewhite told their followers that she had "traveled to the Next Level" because she had "too much energy to remain on Earth", abandoning her body to make the journey. His attempt to explain her death in the terms of the group's doctrine was successful, preventing the departure of all but one member. However, Applewhite became very depressed. He claimed that Nettles still communicated with him, but he suffered from a crisis of faith. His students supported him during this time, greatly encouraging him. He then organized a ceremony in which he symbolically married his followers; Lalich views this as an attempt to ensure unity. Applewhite told his followers that he had been left behind by Nettles because he still had more to learn—he felt that she occupied "a higher spiritual role" than he did. He began identifying her as "the Father" and often referred to her with male pronouns.

Applewhite began to emphasize a strict hierarchy, teaching that his students needed his guidance, as he needed the guidance of the Next Level. Zeller notes that this naturally ensured no possibility of the group's continuing if Applewhite were to die. A relationship with Applewhite was said to be the only way to salvation; he encouraged his followers to see him as Christ. Zeller states that the group's previous focus on individual choice was replaced with an emphasis on Applewhite's role as a mediator. Applewhite maintained some aspects of their scientific teachings, but in the 1980s the group became more like a religion in its focus on faith and submission to authority.

After Nettles' death, Applewhite also altered his view of ascension; previously, he had taught that the group would physically ascend from the Earth and that death caused reincarnation, but her death—which left behind an unchanged, corporeal body—forced him to say that the ascension could be spiritual. He then concluded that her spirit had traveled to a spaceship and received a new body and that his followers and he would do the same. In his view, the Biblical heaven was actually a planet on which highly evolved beings dwelt, and physical bodies were required to ascend there. Applewhite believed that once they reached the Next Level, they would facilitate evolution on other planets. He emphasized that Jesus, whom he believed was an extraterrestrial, came to Earth, was killed, and bodily rose from the dead before being transported onto a spaceship. According to Applewhite's doctrine, Jesus was a gateway to heaven, but had found humanity unready to ascend when he first came to the Earth. Applewhite then decided that an opportunity existed for humans to reach the Next Level "every two millennia", and the early 1990s would therefore provide the first opportunity to reach the Kingdom of Heaven since the time of Jesus. Zeller notes that his beliefs were based on the Christian Bible, but were interpreted through the lens of belief in alien contact with humanity.

Applewhite taught that he was a walk-in, a concept that had gained popularity in the New Age movement during the late 1970s. Walk-ins were said to be higher beings who took control of adult bodies to teach humanity. This concept informed Applewhite's view of resurrection; he believed that his group's souls were to be transported to a spaceship, where they would enter other bodies. Applewhite abandoned the metaphor of a butterfly in favor of describing the body as a mere container, a vehicle that souls could enter and exit. This dualism may have been the product of the Christology that Applewhite learned as a young man; Lewis writes that the group's teachings had "Christian elements [that] were basically grafted on to a New Age matrix". In a profile of the group for Newsweek, Kenneth Woodward compares his dualism to that of ancient Christian Gnosticism, although Peters notes that his theology departs from Gnosticism by privileging the physical world.

In the wake of Nettles' death, Applewhite became increasingly paranoid, fearing a conspiracy against his group. One member who joined in the mid-1980s recalled that Applewhite avoided new converts, worrying that they were infiltrators. He feared a government raid on their home and spoke highly of the Jewish defenders of Masada in ancient Israel who showed total resistance to the Roman Empire. Increasingly, he began to discuss the Apocalypse, comparing the Earth to an overgrown garden that was to be recycled or rebooted and humanity to a failed experiment. In accordance with the garden metaphor, he stated that the Earth would be "spaded under". Woodward notes that Applewhite's teaching about the Earth's recycling is similar to the cyclical perspective of time found in Buddhism. Applewhite also used New Age concepts, but he differed from that movement by predicting that apocalyptic, rather than utopian, changes would soon occur on Earth. He contended that most humans had been brainwashed by Lucifer but that his followers could break free of this control. He specifically cited sexual urges as the work of Lucifer. In addition, he stated that evil extraterrestrials, whom he referred to as "Luciferians", sought to thwart his mission. He argued that many prominent moral teachers and advocates of political correctness were actually Luciferians. This theme emerged in 1988, possibly in response to the lurid alien abduction stories that were proliferating at the time.

== Obscurity and evangelism ==
In the late 1980s, the group kept a low profile; few people knew it still existed. In 1988, they mailed a document that detailed their beliefs to a variety of New Age organizations. The mailing contained information about their history and advised people to read several books, which primarily focused on Christian history and UFOs. With the exception of the 1988 document, Applewhite's group remained inconspicuous until 1992, when they recorded a 12-part video series which was broadcast via satellite. This series echoed many of the teachings of the 1988 update, although it introduced a "universal mind" of which its hearers could partake.

Over the course of the group's existence, several hundred people joined and left. In the early 1990s, their membership dwindled, numbering as few as 26; these defections gave Applewhite a sense of urgency. In May 1993, the group took the name "Total Overcomers Anonymous". They then spent $30,000 to publish a full-page advertisement in USA Today that warned of catastrophic judgment to befall the Earth. Its publication led about 20 former members to rejoin the group. This, along with a series of public lectures in 1994, caused membership to double from its nadir at the beginning of the decade. By this time, Applewhite did not regiment his disciples' lives as strictly as he had and spent less time with them.

In the early 1990s, Applewhite posted some of his teachings on the Internet, but he was stung by the resulting criticism. That year, he first spoke of the possibility of suicide as a way to reach the Next Level. He explained that everything "human" had to be forsaken, including the human body, before one could ascend. The organization was then renamed Heaven's Gate. Davis speculates that this rejection may have encouraged him to attempt to leave Earth.

From June to October 1995, the group lived in a rural part of New Mexico. They purchased 40 acres (16 hectares) and built a compound—which they referred to as the "Earth ship"—using tires and lumber; Applewhite hoped to establish a monastery. This proved to be a difficult endeavor, particularly for the aging Applewhite: he was in poor health and, at one point, feared that he had cancer. Lifton notes that Applewhite's active leadership of the group probably led to severe fatigue in his last years. The winter was very cold, and they abandoned the plan. Afterwards, they lived in several houses in the San Diego area.

The group increasingly focused on the suppression of sexual desire; Applewhite and seven others opted for surgical castration. They initially had difficulty finding a willing surgeon, but eventually found one in Mexico. In Applewhite's view, sexuality was one of the most powerful forces that bound humans to their bodies and thus hindered their efforts to evolve to the Next Level; he taught that Next Level beings had no reproductive organs, but that Luciferian beings had genders. He also cited a verse in the New Testament that said there would not be marriage in heaven. (Note: Matthew 22:30: "For in the resurrection they neither marry, nor are given in marriage, but are as the angels of God in heaven." (KJV)) In addition, he required members to adopt similar clothing and haircuts, possibly to reinforce that they were a nonsexual family.

== Mass suicide ==
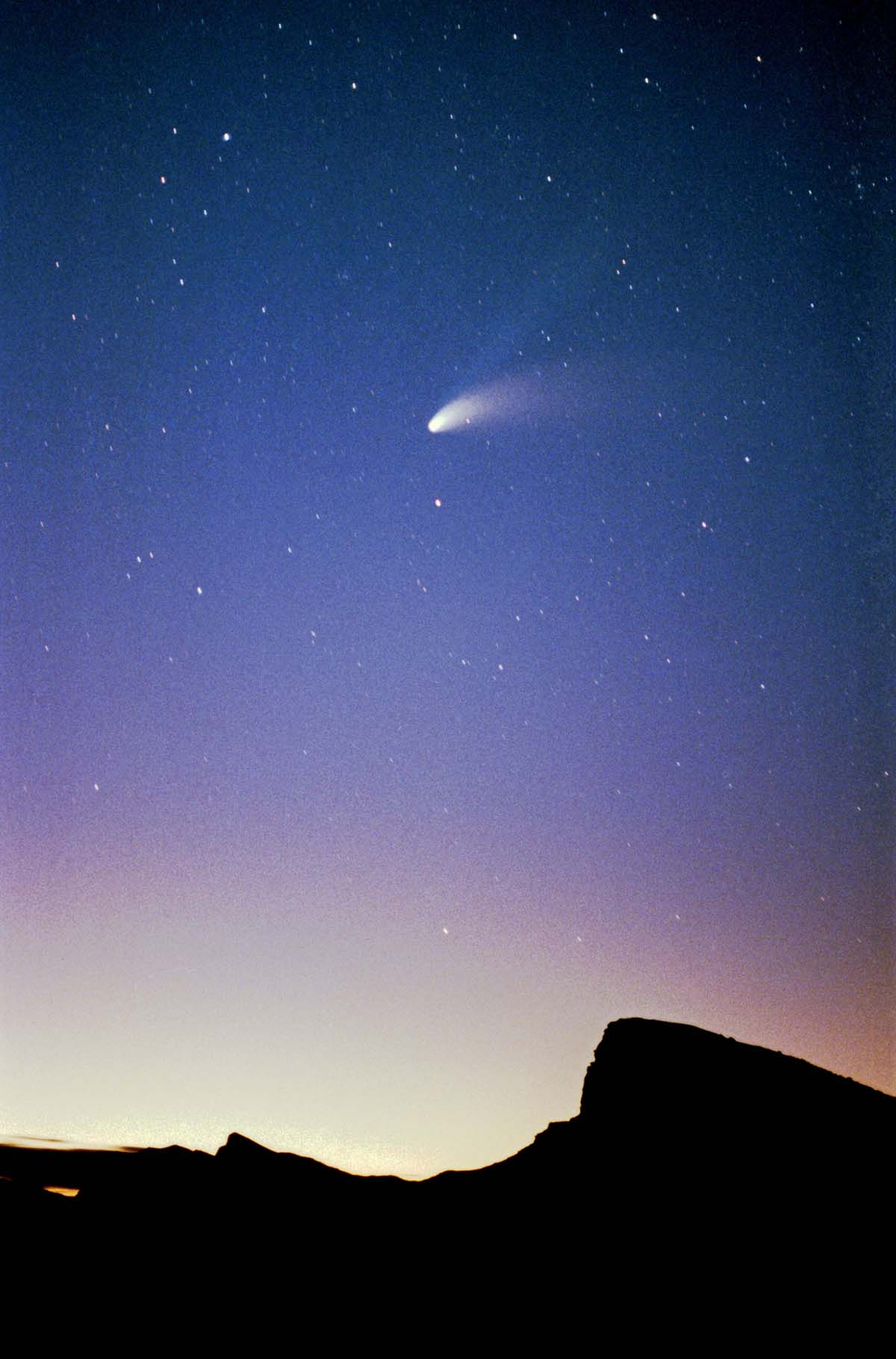
Comet Hale–Bopp over California in April 1997

In October 1996, the group rented a mansion in Rancho Santa Fe, California. That year, they recorded two video messages in which they offered their viewers a "last chance to evacuate Earth". Around the same time, they learned of the approach of Comet Hale–Bopp. Applewhite now believed that Nettles was aboard a spaceship trailing the comet, and that she planned to rendezvous with them. He told his followers that the vessel would transport them to an empyrean destination, and that a government conspiracy was attempting to suppress word of the craft. In addition, he stated that his deceased followers would be taken by the vessel, as well, a belief that resembled the Protestant pretribulation rapture doctrine. How he learned of the comet or why he believed that it was accompanied by extraterrestrials or why he should have believed the dead Nettles would be with them is not known. (Note: In late 1996, rumors of images that showed a mysterious object following the comet spread on the internet. Whitley Strieber, Courtney Brown, and Art Bell helped popularize these reports, claiming that the object was emitting radio signals. (Daniels 1999, pp. 200–2))

In late March 1997, the group isolated themselves and recorded farewell statements. Many members praised Applewhite in their final messages; Davis describes their remarks as "regurgitations of Do's gospel". Applewhite recorded a video shortly before his death, in which he termed the suicides the "final exit" of the group and remarked, "We do in all honesty hate this world". Lewis speculates that Applewhite settled on suicide because he had said that the group would ascend during his lifetime, so appointing a successor was unfeasible.

Religious scholar Catherine Wessinger posits that the suicides began on March 22. Most members took barbiturates, masked the taste with rice pudding, and washed it down with vodka. Some of the members were found with plastic bags over their heads. They all wore identical uniforms, these uniforms consisting of Nike shoes and black uniforms with patches that read "Heaven's Gate Away Team". They all had about six dollars in their shirt pockets, and a bag that contained clothes, daily items, and a form of identification was placed beside most bodies. The deaths occurred over three days; Applewhite was one of the last four to die. Three assistants helped him commit suicide, then killed themselves. An anonymous tip led the San Diego County Sheriff's Department to search the mansion; they found 39 bodies there on March 26. It was the largest group suicide involving U.S. citizens since the 1978 mass murder-suicide of 918 Americans in Jonestown, Guyana. Applewhite's body was found seated on the bed of the mansion's master bedroom. Medical examiners determined that his fears of cancer had been unfounded, but that he suffered from coronary atherosclerosis.

The deaths provoked a media circus, and Applewhite's face was featured on the covers of Time and Newsweek on April 7. His final message was widely broadcast; Hugh Urban of Ohio State University described his appearance in the video as "wild-eyed [and] rather alarming".

== Analysis ==
Although many popular commentators, including psychologist Margaret Singer, speculate that Applewhite brainwashed his followers, many academics have rejected the "brainwashing" label as an oversimplification that does not express the nuances of the process by which the followers were influenced. Lalich speculates that they were willing to follow Applewhite in suicide because they had become totally dependent upon him, hence were poorly suited for life in his absence. Davis attributes Applewhite's success in convincing his followers to commit suicide to two factors: He isolated them socially and cultivated an attitude of complete religious obedience in them. Applewhite's students had made a long-term commitment to him, and Balch and Taylor infer that this is why his interpretations of events appeared coherent to them. Most of the dead had been members for about 20 years, although there were a few recent converts.

Lewis argues that Applewhite effectively controlled his followers by packaging his teachings in familiar terms. Richard Hecht of the University of California, Santa Barbara, echoes this sentiment, arguing that members of the group killed themselves because they believed the narrative that he had constructed, rather than because he psychologically controlled them. In his 2000 study of apocalyptic movements, John R. Hall posits that they were motivated to commit suicide because they saw it as a way to demonstrate that they had conquered the fear of death and truly believed Applewhite.

Urban writes that Applewhite's life displays "the intense ambivalence and alienation shared by many individuals lost in late 20th-century capitalist society". He claims that Applewhite's condemnations of contemporary culture bear similarities to those of Jean Baudrillard at times. Urban posits that Applewhite found no way other than suicide to escape the society that surrounded him and states that death offered him a way to escape its "endless circle of seduction and consumption".

While covering the suicides, several media outlets focused on Applewhite's sexuality; the New York Post dubbed him "the Gay Guru". Gay rights activist Troy Perry argued that Applewhite's repression, and society's rejection, of same-sex relationships ultimately led to his suicide. This idea has failed to gain support among academics. Zeller argues that Applewhite's sexuality was not the primary driving force behind his asceticism, which he believes resulted from a variety of factors, though he grants sexuality a role.

Lalich states that Applewhite fit "the traditional view of a charismatic leader", and Evan Thomas deems him a "master manipulator". Lifton compares Applewhite to Shoko Asahara, the founder of Aum Shinrikyo, describing him as "equally controlling, his paranoia and megalomania gentler yet ever present". Christopher Partridge of Lancaster University states that Applewhite and Nettles were similar to John Reeve and Lodowicke Muggleton, who founded Muggletonianism, a millennialist movement in 17th century England.

== See also ==
- Jim Jones, leader of the religious cult Peoples Temple, who also initiated a mass suicide among his followers
- Messiah complex

== Bibliography ==
=== Books ===
- Balch, Robert (1995). "Waiting for the Ships: Disillusionment and the Revitalization of Faith in Bo and Peep's UFO Cult". In James R. Lewis (ed.). The Gods Have Landed: New Religions from Other Worlds. SUNY Press. ISBN 978-0-7914-2330-1.
- Balch, Robert; Taylor, David (2002). "Making Sense of the Heaven's Gate Suicides". In David G. Bromley and J. Gordon Melton (ed.). Cults, Religion, and Violence. Cambridge University Press. ISBN 978-0-521-66898-9.
- Balch, Robert; Taylor, David (2003). "Heaven's Gate: Implications for the Study of Commitment to New Religions". In James R. Lewis (ed.). Encyclopedic Sourcebook of UFO Religions. Prometheus Books. ISBN 978-1-57392-964-6.
- Chryssides, George D. (2004). ""Come On Up, and I Will Show Thee": Heaven's Gate as a Postmodern Group". In Lewis, James R.; Petersen, Jesper Aagaard (eds.). Controversial New Religions (1st ed.). New York: Oxford University Press. ISBN 978-0-19-515682-9.
- Daniels, Ted (1999). "Comet Halle-Bopp, Planet Nibiru, the Mass Landing, and Heaven's Gate". A Doomsday Reader: Prophets, Predictors, and Hucksters of Salvation. New York University Press. ISBN 978-0-8147-1909-1.
- Goerman, Patricia (2011). "Heaven's Gate: The Dawning of a New Religious Movement". In George D. Chryssides (ed.). Heaven's Gate: Postmodernity and Popular Culture in a Suicide Group. Ashgate Publishing. ISBN 978-0-7546-6374-4.
- Grünschloß, Andreas (2003). Ufological Discourses in Germany. in Partridge 2003
- Hall, John R. (2000). "Finding Heaven's Gate". Apocalypse Observed: Religious Movements, and Violence in North America, Europe, and Japan. Routledge. ISBN 978-0-415-19276-7.
- Lalich, Janja (2004). Bounded Choice: True Believers and Charismatic Cults. University of California Press. ISBN 978-0-520-24018-6.
- Lewis, James R. (2003). Legitimating Suicide: Heaven's Gate and New Age Ideology. in Partridge 2003
- McCutcheon, Russell T. (2003). The Discipline of Religion: Structure, Meaning, Rhetoric. Psychology Press. ISBN 978-0-415-27490-6.
- Lifton, Robert Jay (2000). Destroying the World to Save it: Aum Shinrikyō, Apocalyptic Violence, and the New Global Terrorism. Macmillan Publishers. ISBN 978-0-8050-6511-4.
- Partridge, Christopher (2006). "The Eschatology of Heaven's Gate". In Newport, Kenneth G. C.; Gribben, Crawford (eds.). Expecting the End: Millennialism in Social And Historical Context. Baylor University Press. ISBN 978-1-932792-38-6.
- Partridge, Christopher, ed. (2003). UFO Religions. Routledge. ISBN 978-0-4152-6324-5. OL 7489025M.
- Peters, Ted (2003). "UFOs, Heaven's Gate, and the Theology of Suicide". In James R. Lewis (ed.). Encyclopedic Sourcebook of UFO Religions. Prometheus Books. ISBN 978-1-57392-964-6.
- Wessinger, Catherine (2000). How the Millennium Comes Violently: From Jonestown to Heaven's Gate. Seven Bridges Press. ISBN 978-1-889119-24-3.
- Zeller, Benjamin E. (2010). Prophets and Protons: New Religious Movements and Science in Late Twentieth-Century America. NYU Press. ISBN 978-0-8147-9720-4.
- Zeller, Benjamin E. (2011). "The Euphemization of Violence: The Case of Heaven's Gate". In Lewis, James R. (ed.). Violence and New Religious Movements. Oxford University Press. ISBN 978-0-19-973563-1.

=== Journals ===
- Davis, Winston (2000). "Heaven's Gate: A Study of Religious Obedience". Nova Religio. 3 (2). University of California Press: 241–267. doi:10.1525/nr.2000.3.2.241.
- Feltmate, David (2011). "New Religious Movements in Animated Adult Sitcoms—A Spectrum of Portrayals". Religion Compass. 5 (7). John Wiley & Sons: 343–54. doi:10.1111/j.1749-8171.2011.00287.x.
- Lalich, Janja (2004). "Using the Bounded Choice Model as an Analytical Tool: A Case Study of Heaven's Gate". Cultic Studies Review. 3 (3). International Cultic Studies Association: 226–247.
- Raine, Susan (2005). "Reconceptualising the Human Body: Heaven's Gate and the Quest for Divine Transformation". Religion. 35 (2). Elsevier: 98–117. doi:10.1016/j.religion.2005.06.003. S2CID 144033418.
- Urban, Hugh (2000). "The Devil at Heaven's Gate: Rethinking the Study of Religion in the Age of Cyber-Space" (PDF). Nova Religio. 3 (2). University of California Press: 268–302. doi:10.1525/nr.2000.3.2.268. Archived from the original (PDF) on July 21, 2018.
- Zeller, Benjamin E. (2006). "Scaling Heaven's Gate: Individualism and Salvation in a New Religious Movement". Nova Religio. 10 (2). University of California Press: 75–102. doi:10.1525/nr.2006.10.2.75.
- Zeller, Benjamin E. (2010). "Extraterrestrial Biblical Hermeneutics and the Making of Heaven's Gate". Nova Religio. 14 (2). University of California Press: 34–60. doi:10.1525/nr.2010.14.2.34.

=== Magazines ===
- Dahir, Mubarak (May 13, 1997). "Heaven's Scapegoat". The Advocate: 35–7.
- Lippert, Barbara (April 14, 1997). "Cult Fiction". New York: 30–3.
- Miller, Mark (April 13, 1997). "Secrets Of The Cult". Newsweek.
- Woodward, Kenneth (April 6, 1997). "Christ And Comets". Newsweek.

=== Newspapers ===
- "Cult's Founder Turned from Music to UFOs". Associated Press. March 28, 1997.
- "Heaven's Gate: A Timeline". The San Diego Union-Tribune. March 18, 2007. Archived from the original on October 18, 2012.
- Bearak, Barry (April 28, 1997). "Eyes on Glory: Pied Pipers of Heaven's Gate". The New York Times.
- Harris, Ron (March 28, 1997). "Mysterious Couple may be the Founders of Suicide Cult". Associated Press.
- Jones, J. Harry (March 18, 2007). "Heaven's Gate Revisited". The San Diego Union-Tribune. Archived from the original on March 5, 2014.
- Monmaney, Terence (April 4, 1997). "Free Will, or Thought Control?". Los Angeles Times.
- Steinberg, Jacques (March 29, 1997). "From Religious Childhood To Reins of a U.F.O. Cult". The New York Times.
