= Millennium, Messiahs, and Mayhem =

1997 book by Susan J. Palmer and Thomas Robbins

- Cover of the first edition
- Editor: Susan J. Palmer; Thomas Robbins
- Language: English
- Subject: Apocalypticism
- Publisher: Routledge
- Publication date: 1997
- Publication place: United States
- Pages: 334
- ISBN: 0-415-91648-8
- OCLC: 36727121
- Dewey Decimal: 291.2
- LC Class: BL2520 .M55 1997

Millennium, Messiahs, and Mayhem: Contemporary Apocalyptic Movements is an edited volume about apocalypticism and millenarianism, largely but not entirely within a North American context. It was edited by sociologists Susan J. Palmer and Thomas Robbins, and was published in 1997 by Routledge. Contributors to the book include David G. Bromley, Catherine Wessinger, Robert W. Balch, Anson Shupe, Massimo Introvigne, Michael Barkun, and Dick Anthony, of 21 authors total. The book has 16 chapters in 4 sections divided by theme.

The first section focuses on theories about the meaning of apocalypticism, apocalypticism within secular organizations and organized religion, and how apocalypticism may lead to violence. Specific topics covered in the book include survivalism, apocalyptic religious groups, cryonics, environmentalism, feminism. Individual groups covered include the new religious movements Aum Shinrikyo, the Order of the Solar Temple, and the Branch Davidians, but also more historical Christian groups like American Catholics, Christian reconstructionism, Seventh-day Adventism and Mormons. It received a positive critical reception, with praise for the wide variety of cases and topics considered in the book. As with many edited volumes it was viewed by some reviewers as uneven between chapters, and the inconsistency of the academic jargon used was somewhat criticized.

== Contents ==
In an introduction, Palmer and Robbins recount the initial millennial fears of the year AD 1000, comparing this to the then future millennialist 2000 ideologies. They discuss differing views of apocalypticism — eschatology where the end is viewed as imminent — and argue that North American apocalypticism is no longer strictly religious, with ideas crossing secular–religious lines. The cause of violence in apocalyptic groups is discussed, with the editors suggesting that such apocalyptic thought becomes dangerous when "actual events appear markedly convergent with the anticipated scenarios of zealots". They note that the book's contents are largely limited to a North American context. The book's 16 chapters are split into four sections, each with four essays, by theme following the introduction: "Theories of Apocalypticism", "Secularizing the Millennium", "Apocalypticism and the Churches" and "Violence and Confrontation".

"Theories of Apocalypticism" discusses theoretical problems that may arise with "apocalypticism" as a concept and related ones. David G. Bromley argues that the definition of apocalypticism should be removed from its origins in Judaism and Christianity when discussed by scholars, arguing it should be instead viewed as a unique and radical form of social organization. Catherine Wessinger, also focusing on the definitions, argues for the replacement of the terms "premillennialism" and "postmillennialism" with "catastrophic millennialism" and "progressive millennialism", since the groups are not all using the same view of time. James A. Aho argues for modernity and postmodernism's relationship with these concepts. Robert W. Balch, with several co-authors, focuses on the failed prophecy of a Baháʼí Faith sect, which despite the prophecy repeatedly failing to come to fruition survived; they argue this was done by developing a culture that minimized cognitive dissonance.

"Secularizing the Millennium" covers the secular organizations and concepts that contain millenarian aspects, including survivalist militias, environmentalists, technological aspects of millennialism, and women within new religious movements. Lamy argues that survivalist militias, while basing their ideas off of religious imagery, build an alternative plan for society in the real world instead of simply waiting for a religious savior; Martha F. Lee interprets the Earth First! environmentalist group as a millennial group. Technological solutions that were proposed to avoid the end of mankind, including cryonics, eugenics, and space colonization are discussed by Bozeman. Palmer discusses women within NRMs. "Apocalypticism and the Churches" is on the concepts observed within schismatic Christian groups, including the apocalypticism of American Catholics, Christian reconstructionism, Seventh-day Adventism and Mormons. Michael W. Cuneo discusses the occurrence of apocalyptic ideology within American Catholics, while Anson Shupe covers reconstructionism, while the persistence of apocalyptic ideology within the Seven-Day Adventists is discussed by Ronald Lawson, while millenarianism of modern day Mormons is covered by Introvigne, focusing on the tension between its core millenarian beliefs and how this is viewed in practice by members.

"Violence and Confrontation" discusses the relationship between violence and apocalypticism with four specific movements: the Christian Identity movement, the Branch Davidians and the Waco siege, the Order of the Solar Temple, and Aum Shinrikyo. Michael Barkun covers Christian Identity, a white supremacist interpretation of Christianity, while Dick Anthony and Thomas Robbins write on the Branch Davidians and Waco siege, in which many members of the group perished during a confrontation with the FBI. John R. Hall and Philip Schuyler cover the Solar Temple, a group that had orchestrated mass murder-suicide in two locations in Switzerland in 1994, only to be followed by two more waves in 1995 and 1997; they argue their suicide was theological in nature; the group had, in their view, used their suicides as an affirmation of religious belief. The final chapter has Mark R. Mullins write on Aum Shinrikyo, notorious for its repeated acts of terror, and its classification as an apocalyptic movement.

== Contributors ==
- James A. Aho
- Dick Anthony
- Michael Barkun
- John M. Bozeman
- David G. Bromley
- Robert W. Balch
- Michael W. Cuneo
- John Domitrovich
- John R. Hall
- Massimo Introvigne
- Barbara Lynn Mahnke
- Vanessa Morrison
- Mark R. Mullins
- Philip Lamy
- Ronald Lawson
- Martha F. Lee
- Susan J. Palmer
- Philip Schuyler
- Anson Shupe
- Thomas Robbins
- Catherine Wessinger

== Publication and authors ==
Millennium, Messiahs, and Mayhem was published in 1997 by Routledge. Thomas Robbins was a sociologist of religion, having edited or written several books on the topic of religion. Susan J. Palmer is a sociologist and specialist in new religious movements, and at the time of the book's publication taught at Dawson College and Concordia University. The 21 contributors to the book come from 9 different fields, largely scholars of religion or sociologists. The book has a black cover, which The Age connected to its subject matter of beliefs on doomsday.

== Reception ==
"Such an ending is troubling, for although most of the essays are well written, one is left with the suspicion that this will only be distinguished as one of the better Y2K books that will soon be forgotten as the year 2000 passes and all the millennial ferment that scholars expected (and hoped for?) never materializes."

— Timothy E. Fulop, Church History

The book received largely positive reviews. Historian of religion Stephen J. Stein, in a review essay on the relationship between religion and violence, praised the book for the variety of examples as well as the book's breadth, which he said reminded the reader that "violence is more than murder, group suicide, or terrorism". Stuart A. Wright found the relationship between the secular and the religious in the work to be ill defined, taking issue with the book's general conceptual clarity; he said that despite its problems it had much to offer. Reviewer Nathan Rousseau called it "unquestionably a significant contribution as a general scholarly introduction" to the topic, while sociologist Enzo Pace writing for the Archives de sciences sociales des religions praised the analyses and the "richness of the cases analyzed", and said the work was a "good sociological laboratory for the study of that perpetual vital force which Desroche had already admirably dissected and which animates the apocalyptic and millenarian imaginary." James T. Richardson called it a "fine collection of high-quality papers", though said "some may think the effort too ambitious and the coverage too varied", while Timothy Miller praised it as engagingly written and among the best on the subject matter. Steve Zitrin called the book as a whole as informative, though noted it was more oriented to those who study religion and not other disciplines. Timothy E. Fulop, while calling it a "judicious examination" of the subject matter, called the book's ending focusing on recently notorious groups troubling, saying it could be a sign it was only one of many Y2K books that would be forgotten.

Librarian magazine Library Journal praised it as "giving a good overview of a complicated topic", praising its extensive references. Choice magazine called it "excellent", "well edited and always readable" and highly recommended it. They praised the variety of case studies included. A review from the Ohio newspaper The Plain Dealer said many of the essays in the book were "larded with grimly academic phrases" but also contained "intriguing studies of bizarre millennarian groups", while the Australian newspaper The Age complimented it as "an excellent collection" and "valuable reading" for those interested in how people, cultures and organizations behave in times of anxiety. They praised it for comprehensively examining how "some groups will use charisma, power, religion" to bring on "their version of armageddon". The Age praised Mullins' chapter on Aum, calling it a "valuable and careful" description of Aum Shinrikyo and its leader. The Plain Dealer called the chapter on the Solar Temple "particularly well-written", while Stein called Wessinger's chapter discussing terminology at hand and its issues "well placed" in its criticism, though disagreed with her on the idea of abandoning the word "cult" entirely instead of reclaiming its original meaning. Historian Kevin Madigan noted Wessinger's view on the topic as having "an attitude toward religious truth that differs as much from atheism, agnosticism, polytheism, and monotheism as it does from traditional Christianity".

The book was viewed by some as uneven in quality, though reviewers said this was the case with many edited volumes, though Miller argued against this, saying that while this was something "customary in reviewing editing volumes" he found all the chapters "substantial and respectably constructed" even if they differed. He did however argue it suffered from another shortcoming of edited volumes, that the writers appeared to have not read the other contributions which made it confusing. Richardson called the divisions somewhat arbitrary; Brenda E. Brasher noted that, though the authors made an effort to define their terms, the definitions varied from chapter to chapter with little consideration given to how this related to the scholarly consensus, which she thought would make the book confusing for nonspecialists. Zitrin noted it as containing some "less adequate pieces", calling the Aum Shinrikyo chapter as brief and said it did not have "much more information than an in-depth newspaper article", and called Aho's chapter a "specious attack on postmodernism" that had "little bearing on the other contributions in the book". Fulop found its omission of the Y2K computer bug and fears of an economic and school collapse odd, calling the book more of a scholarly "tour through the zoo" instead of discussing more widespread concerns, while Rousseau regretted the lack of a consideration of what effective responses could be made to these groups. Rousseau also found the inclusion of the Japanese Aum Shinrikyo to be, given the book's otherwise exclusive focus on North American topics as noted by its editors, puzzling. Brasher also called the absence of studies on ethnic minority apocalyptic movements, though acknowledged by the authors, to be "inexcusable". Fulop called Palmer's chapter the best in the section, though he and other reviewers argued it was misplaced in its section and should have gone in the first.
