= Old College =

Old College may refer to:

- Old College, Aberystwyth, in Wales
- Old College, Dorchester, the former Dorchester College in Oxfordshire, England
- Old College, University of Edinburgh, in Scotland
- Old College (Northwestern University), in Illinois, United States
- Old College, University of Notre Dame, in Indiana, United States
- Old College Lawn Tennis and Croquet Club, in London, England
- Nevada School of Law at Old College, in the United States

== See also ==
- Olds College, in Olds, Alberta, Canada
