= Dick Anthony =

American psychologist (1939–2022)

- Born: September 24, 1939
- Died: July 24, 2022 (aged 82)

Academic background
- Education: Graduate Theological Union (PhD)

Academic work
- Discipline: Forensic psychologist

Dick Anthony (September 24, 1939 – July 24, 2022) was a forensic psychologist noted for his writings on the validity of brainwashing as a determiner of behavior, a researcher of the social and psychological aspects of involvement in new religious movements.

== Academic career ==
Anthony held a PhD from the Graduate Theological Union, Berkeley, California. He supervised research at the Department of Psychiatry of the University of North Carolina at Chapel Hill and at the Graduate Theological Union, and was a former director of the Graduate Theological Union's UC Berkeley-affiliated Center for the Study of New Religions. His research has been supported by government agencies including the National Institute of Mental Health, the National Institute of Drug Abuse, and the National Endowment for the Humanities, and he frequently testified or acted as a consultant in court cases involving allegations of religious coercion or harm resulting from involvement in a religious group. Anthony authored or co-authored multiple scholarly articles on the topic and has co-edited several books.

== Involvement in the brainwashing debate ==
Anthony has characterized brainwashing as "a pseudo-scientific myth", and spearheaded efforts which, from 1990 onward, led to the general rejection of brainwashing testimony as unscientific in United States courts. Anthony asserted in The Washington Post that "no reasonable person would question that there are situations where people can be influenced against their best interests, but those arguments are evaluated on the basis of fact, not bogus expert testimony." Dismissing the idea of mind control, he has defended new religious movements, and argued that involvement in such movements may often have beneficial, rather than harmful effects.

Anthony was a key consultant for the government in the Fishman case and acted as a consultant in many subsequent cases of a similar nature, "frequently getting pseudoscientific mind control testimony excluded from evidentiary hearings". According to sociologist James T. Richardson, he was the "intellectual driving force" behind an amicus curiae brief on brainwashing endorsed by the American Psychological Association. In the Fishman case, the court accepted Anthony's argument that Margaret Singer's brainwashing theory lacked scientific support, a decision that set a legal precedent and led to the exclusion of Margaret Singer and her colleague Richard Ofshe as expert witnesses in this and subsequent trials. Afterwards, Singer and Ofshe twice sued Anthony, as well as the American Psychological Association, the American Sociological Association and several other scholars, for defamation and conspiracy to deprive them of their livelihoods. Both suits were dismissed; in the second the judge granted the defendants a SLAPP motion, requiring Singer and Ofshe to pay Anthony's and the other defendants' legal costs.

Anthony contributed a 100-page chapter on the brainwashing hypothesis to the book Misunderstanding Cults, edited by sociologists Benjamin Zablocki and Thomas Robbins, in which he criticized the "tactical ambiguity" of brainwashing theorists like Zablocki. In Anthony's view, brainwashing proponents have, in their efforts to resurrect a discredited hypothesis, continually modified key assumptions underlying the concept in order to avoid any possibility of its empirical verification. The chapter argues that "the term brainwashing has such sensationalist connotations that its use prejudices any scientific discussion of patterns of commitment in religious movements."

== Reception ==
David G. Bromley and Anson Shupe, writing in the Encyclopedia of Religion and Society (1998), have credited Anthony and his co-author, sociologist Thomas Robbins, with having written "the most articulate critique" of the anti-cult movement's perspective on brainwashing. The sociologist James T. Richardson has referred to Anthony's scholarly work on brainwashing as "without peer".

== Death ==
Anthony died July 24, 2022, at the age of 82.

== Publications ==
=== Book chapters and articles ===
- "Brainwashing and Totalitarian Influence", in Encyclopedia of Mental Health, ed. Howard S. Friedman, Academic Press, 1998, ISBN 978-0-12-226676-8, pp. 331–346 (with Thomas Robbins)
- "Cults, Brainwashing and Counter-Subversion," Annals 446(1979):78–90 (with Thomas Robbins)
- "Cults in the Late Twentieth Century", in Encyclopedia of the American Religious Experience. Studies of Traditions and Movements, eds. Charles H. Lippy and Peter W. Williams, Charles Scribner's Sons, New York (1988) Vol II, ISBN 978-0-684-18861-4
- "Deprogramming, Brainwashing and the Medicalization of Deviant Religious Groups", Social Problems, Vol. 29, No. 3, February 1982 (with Thomas Robbins)
- "Getting Straight with Meher Baba: A Study of Drug Rehabilitation, Mysticism, and Post-adolescent Role Conflict", Journal for the Scientific Study of Religion, 1972 (with Thomas Robbins)
- "Law, Social Science and the 'Brainwashing' Exception to the First Amendment," Behavioral Sciences and the Law 10(1992):5–30 (with Thomas Robbins)
- "Pseudoscience versus Minority Religions: An Evaluation of the Brainwashing Theories of Jean-Marie Abgrall", in Regulating Religion, ed. James T. Richardson, Springer, 2004, ISBN 978-0-306-47887-1, pp. 127–149 (with Thomas Robbins)
- "Religious Movements and 'Brainwashing' Litigation" in In Gods We Trust: New Patterns of Religious Pluralism in America, eds. Dick Anthony and Thomas Robbins, Transaction Publishers, New Brunswick, NJ, ISBN 0-88738-800-0 (with Thomas Robbins)
- "Religious Totalism, Violence, and Exemplary Dualism," in Terrorism and Political Violence 7(1995):10–50 (with Thomas Robbins)
- "Sects and Violence," in Armageddon at Waco, ed. S. A. Wright (Chicago: University of Chicago Press, 1995): 236–259 (with Thomas Robbins)
- "Tactical Ambiguity and Brainwashing Formulations: Science or Pseudo-Science?, in Misunderstanding Cults, eds. B. D. Zablocki and Thomas Robbins, University of Toronto Press, 2001, ISBN 978-0-8020-8188-9, pp. 215–317
- "The 'Brainwashing' Metaphor as a Social Weapon: A New Conceptual Tool for the Therapeutic State", for a symposium on deprogramming held at the annual meetings of the Society for the Scientific Study of Religion, 1977 (with Thomas Robbins and Jim MacCarthy)
- "The Limits of Symbolic Realism: Problems of Emphatic Field Observation in a Sectarian Context", Journal for the Scientific Study of Religion, 1973 (with Thomas Robbins and Thomas E. Curtis)
- "Theory and Research on Today's 'New Religions'", Sociology of Religion, Sociological Analysis 1978 39(2):95-122; doi:10.2307/3710211 (with Thomas Robbins and James T. Richardson)
- "Youth Culture Religious Movements: Evaluating the Integrative Hypothesis", 1975, Sociological Quarterly, Volume 16 Issue 1, Pages 48–64 (with Thomas Robbins and Thomas E. Curtis)

=== Books ===
- In Gods We Trust: New Patterns of Religious Pluralism in America, Transaction Publishers, 1990, ISBN 978-0-88738-800-2 (with Thomas Robbins)
- Spiritual Choices: The Problems of Recognizing Authentic Paths to Inner Transformation, Paragon House, 1987, ISBN 978-0-913729-14-4 (with Thomas Robbins and Ken Wilber)
