= Nevada School of Law at Old College =

Former law school in Nevada, United States

Coordinates: 39.5266°N 119.8188°W

Nevada School of Law at Old College was the first law school established in the state of Nevada. The school, located in Reno, was founded in 1981 by former president of Gonzaga University Rev. John "Jack" P. Leary and then-Washoe County District Attorney Cal Dunlap. After its first year, the school moved from the former St. Thomas Aquinas Parochial School to its permanent home at the old Reno Gazette-Journal newspaper plant donated by the Gannett Company. The school lacked the financial means by which to gain full accreditation from the American Bar Association, and it closed its doors in August 1988. At the time of its closure, the school had an 85% first-time bar passage rate among its graduates.

== Notable alumni ==
- David Humke, Nevada state assemblyman
- James T. Richardson, sociologist
