= Christopher Partridge =

British academic (born 1961)

- Born: Christopher Hugh Partridge; 1961 (age 64–65)

Academic background
- Education: University of Aberdeen
- Thesis: Revelation, Religion and Christian Uniqueness (1995)

Academic work
- Discipline: Religious studies
- Institutions: Lancaster University

Christopher Hugh Partridge (born 1961) is an author, editor, professor at Lancaster University, and founding Co-director of the Centre for the Study of Religion and Popular Culture.

== Bibliography ==
- The Encyclopedia of New Religions: New Religious Movements, Sects and Alternative Spiritualities (Lion Hudson Plc, 2006)
- The Lure of the Dark Side: Satan & Western Demonology in Popular Culture (Equinox Publishing Ltd, SW11, 2008)
- The Re-Enchantment of the West: Alternative Spiritualities, Sacralization, Popular Culture and Occulture, Vol I and Vol II, (T. & T. Clark Publishers, 2006)
- Dub in Babylon: The Emergence and Influence of Dub Reggae in Jamaica and Britain from King Tubby to Post-punk (Equinox Publishing, 2010)
- The Lyre of Orpheus: Popular Music, the Sacred, and the Profane (Oxford University Press, 2013)
- ——, ed. (2015). The Occult World. New York: Routledge. ISBN 978-0-415-69596-1.
- Mortality and Music: Popular Culture and the Awareness of Death (Bloomsbury, 2015)
- High Culture: Drugs, Mysticism, and the Pursuit of Transcendence in the Modern World (Oxford University Press, 2018)
- Cannabis, Sacred and Profane (Bloomsbury Publishing, 2024)

== See also ==
- Satan in popular culture
