= Benjamin Beit-Hallahmi =

Israeli professor of psychology (born 1943)

- בנימין בית-הלחמי
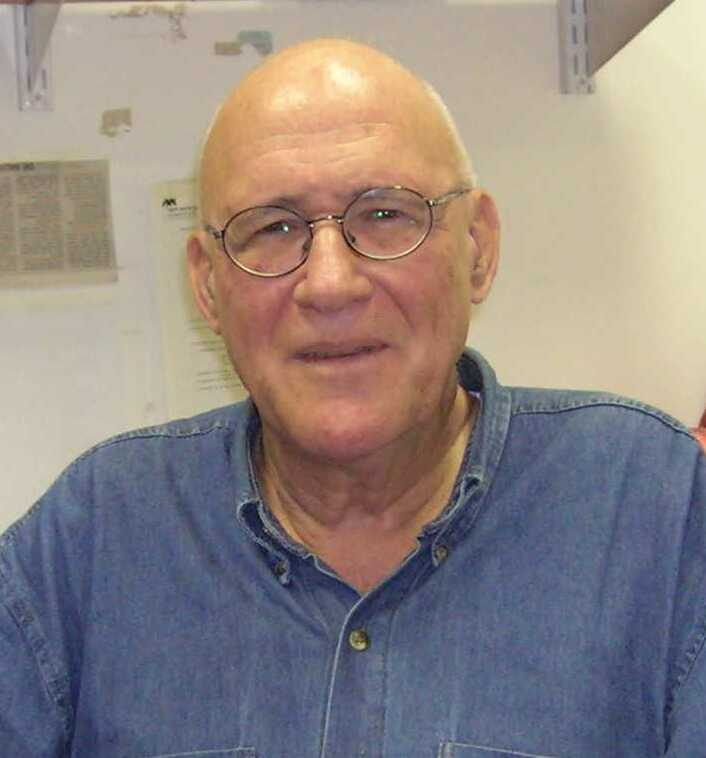
- Born: June 12, 1943 (age 83); Tel Aviv, Israel
- Education: Michigan State University
- Scientific career
- Fields: Psychology, religion, new religious movements, cults
- Workplaces: University of Haifa

Benjamin Beit-Hallahmi (Hebrew: בנימין בית-הלחמי; born June 12, 1943) is a professor emeritus of psychology at the University of Haifa, Israel. In 1970 Beit-Hallahmi received a PhD in clinical psychology from Michigan State University.

== Early life and education ==
Benjamin Beit-Hallahmi was born in 1943 in Tel Aviv, Israel. He served in the Israel Defense Forces from 1963 to 1966. He received his BA degree from the Hebrew University of Jerusalem and went on to receive his MA and PhD in clinical psychology from Michigan State University in 1968 and 1970, respectively.

== Career ==
His work particularly focuses on psychology of religion. Beit-Hallahmi taught at, among others, Hebrew University of Jerusalem, University of Pennsylvania, and the University of Michigan. He was a psychology professor and senior lecturer at the University of Haifa from 1973 on.

He has authored several books, both on new religious movements or cults, and the relationship between Judaism and Zionism. He has described himself as a progressive and a critic of Israel. He has published several books criticizing Israel. In the 1980s, he advocated the establishment of a binational state, and was a charter member of the group Council of Israel-Palestine Peace.

== Reception ==
A writer for the Encyclopaedia Judaica called him a "leading authority on the social psychology of religion".

A review in the Journal of Palestine Studies of The Israeli Connection was positive, saying it painted a valuable portrait of Israel's geopolitical relations, as did a review in Archives de sciences sociales des religions. Writing of the same book, Edy Kaufmann negatively reviewed it, writing "it is difficult to review a book written by a scholar whose driving force is to advocate a single point of view [...] one would expect a balanced and professional point of view, or at least a bias disclosed at the outset", but that the book had a "consistent and serious bias". He criticized the book as very selectively presenting facts to paint the picture Beit-Hallahmi wanted to portray; he negatively contrasted Beit-Hallahmi's work against the work of Palestinian scholar Bishara Bahbah. A review in Africa Today called it overstated and polemical, but said even if one agreed with him the "quality of his evidence and data would lead one to raise serious questions about his qualifications as a scholar". Foreign Affairs wrote that though "the story is pieced together from many scattered items and news reports, the reliability of some of which may be suspect, and the interpretations may be overdrawn [...] the book is indeed strong medicine, and many friends of Israel will not like it, but the arguments and facts adduced cannot be dismissed out of hand."

In the field of new religious movement and cult studies, Beit-Hallahmi is known as very critical of new religious movements. He has written that in the 1980s a conspiracy of scholars collaborated to blacklist critics of cults. Previously, in 1987, anti-cult psychologist Margaret Singer said he was too sympathetic to cults, when he criticized the concept of brainwashing in 1987, and accused him of being part of the same conspiracy. He contributed to the 2001 book Misunderstanding Cults: Searching for Objectivity in a Controversial Field, which has pieces from both the "pro and anti-cult" sides, as a "cult basher". He has criticized the Church of Scientology and said it is not a religion.

Beit-Hallahmi authored a 2025 book that examines the relationship between academics in the new religious movement research network and the groups they elect to study, titled Academic Advocacy for New Religious Movements: Of Apocalypse and Justice. The academic Stuart A. Wright gave a review of the work. Several of Wright's publications are criticized extensively in the book. Beit-Hallahmi refers, for example, to claims Wright makes in defense of the Rajneesh movement with regards to the 1984 Rajneeshee bioterror attack and other criminal activity. Wright was very critical of the work, calling it an "unfortunate tome" and an "exercise in conspiracy theory". He wrote that "it appears that Beit-Hallahmi has an agenda and the 'facts' are made to fit that agenda". He also criticized the manuscript for, in his view, being full of mistakes and typographical errors.

== Bibliography ==
=== Books ===
- The Social Psychology of Religion (1975, with Michael Argyle)
- Psychoanalysis and religion: A bibliography, Norwood Editions, 1978
- The Israeli Connection: Who Israel Arms and Why, 1987, ISBN 0-394-55922-3
- Prolegomena to the Psychological Study of Religion, 1989, ISBN 0-8387-5159-8
- Despair and Deliverance: Private Salvation in Contemporary Israel, 1992, ISBN 0-394-55922-3
- Original Sins: Reflections on the History of Zionism and Israel (1992)
- The Annotated Dictionary of Modern Religious Movements, 1994, ISBN 0-7172-7273-7
- Religion, Psychopathology And Coping.(International Series in the Psychology of Religion 4), 1996, Rodopi Bv Editions, ISBN 90-420-0101-1
- Psychoanalytic Studies of Religion: A Critical Assessment and Annotated Bibliography, 1996, ISBN 0-313-27362-6
- The Psychology of Religious Behaviour, Belief and Experience, 1997, w/ Michael Argyle, Routledge, ISBN 0-415-12331-3
- The Illustrated Encyclopedia of Active New Religions, Sects, and Cults, 1997, ISBN 0-8239-1505-0
- Original Sins: Reflections on the History of Zionism and Israel, 1998, ISBN 1-56656-130-2
- Academic Advocacy for New Religious Movements: Of Apocalypse and Justice (2025)

=== Papers ===
- "Dangers of the vagina". British Journal of Medical Psychology, volume 58, 351–356.
- Scientology: Religion or racket?, 2003, Marburg Journal of Religion, Volume 8, No. 1
- ——— (2011). "Jewish Religious Life in State of Israel". In Berlin, Adele (ed.). The Oxford Dictionary of the Jewish Religion (2nd ed.). Oxford; New York: Oxford University Press. pp. 385–87. ISBN 978-0-19-975927-9.
