= Thomas Robbins (sociologist) =

American sociologist (1943–2015)

- Born: October 13, 1943
- Died: August 31, 2015 (aged 71)
- Citizenship: United States

Academic background
- Education: Harvard University (B.A.); University of North Carolina (Ph.D.)

Thomas Robbins (October 13, 1943 – August 31, 2015) was an American author and an independent scholar of sociology of religion.

== Life and work ==
Thomas Robbins was born October 13, 1943. He had a sister. In his youth, he was a follower of the guru Meher Baba.

Robbins obtained a B.A. in government from Harvard University in 1965, and a Ph.D. in Sociology, at the University of North Carolina in 1973. He subsequently held teaching or research positions at Queens College (CUNY), the New School for Social Research, Yale University and the Graduate Theological Union. He edited several anthology volumes on new religious movements. His scholarship was independently financed.

Among Robbins' early work are notable studies comparing contemporary and historical controversies, such as the mass suicides among the Russian Old Believers and those that occurred in Jonestown in 1979, or present-day agitation against "cults" and similar controversies surrounding Catholicism, Mormonism and Freemasonry in the early nineteenth century. From the mid-1980s, Robbins became increasingly focused on legal and church-state issues related to new religious movements. He has written extensively on the legal and social-science issues related to the alleged use of mind control by therapeutic and religious groups. Together with his colleague, the psychologist Dick Anthony, Robbins has been one of the most prominent critics of the anti-cult movement's views on brainwashing.

Robbins died August 31, 2015.

== Publications ==
=== Articles and book chapters ===
- D. Anthony and T. Robbins, "Law, Social Science and the 'Brainwashing' Exception to the First Amendment," Behavioral Sciences and the Law 10(1992):5-30
- D. Anthony and T. Robbins, "Religious Totalism, Violence, and Exemplary Dualism," in Terrorism and Political Violence 7(1995):10-50
- T. Robbins, "Religious Mass Suicide Before Jonestown," Sociological Analysis 41(1986):1-20
- T. Robbins and D. Anthony, "Cults, Brainwashing and Counter-Subversion," Annals 446(1979):78-90
- T. Robbins and D. Anthony, "Sects and Violence," in Armageddon at Waco, ed. S. A. Wright (Chicago: University of Chicago Press, 1995): 236-259
- T. Robbins and D. Bromley, "Social Experimentation and the Significance of American New Religions," Research in the Social Scientific Study of Religion, Vol. 4 (Greenwich, Conn.: JAI, 1992): 1-29
- T. Robbins and R. Robertson, "Studying Religion Today," Religion 21(1991):319-339.

=== Books ===
- D. Anthony and T. Robbins (eds.), In Gods We Trust: New Patterns of Religious Pluralism in America, Transaction Publishers, 1981, 1990, 1996, ISBN 978-0-88738-800-2
- R. Anthony, J. Needleman, T. Robbins, The New Religious Movements: Conversion, Coercion and Commitment, Crossroad Publishing Company, 1983, ISBN 978-0-8245-0484-7
- T. Robbins, W. C. Shepherd, J. McBride (eds.), Cults, Culture, and the Law: Perspectives on New Religious Movements, American Academy of Religion, Studies in Religion, No 36, Scholars Press, 1985, ISBN 978-0-89130-832-4
- T. Robbins and R. Robertson, Church-state Relations: Tensions and Transitions, Transaction Publishers, 1987, ISBN 978-0-88738-651-0
- T. Robbins, Cults, Converts, and Charisma: the Sociology of New Religious Movements, Sage Publications, 1988, ISBN 978-0-8039-8158-4
- ——; Palmer, Susan J., eds. (1997). Millennium, Messiahs, and Mayhem: Contemporary Apocalyptic Movements. Routledge. ISBN 0-415-91649-6.
- B. Zablocki and T. Robbins (eds.), Misunderstanding Cults: Searching for Objectivity in a Controversial Field, Toronto, University of Toronto Press, 2001, ISBN 0-8020-8188-6
- P. C. Lucas and T. Robbins (eds.), New Religious Movements in the 21st Century: Legal, Political, and Social Challenges in Global Perspective, New York, Routledge, 2004, ISBN 0-415-96577-2
