= Robert W. Balch =

American sociologist (born 1945)

Robert William Balch
- Born: 1945 (age 80–81); United States
- Education: University of Oregon; Arizona State University
- Scientific career
- Fields: cults, new religious movements, sociology
- Workplaces: University of Montana

Robert William Balch is a sociologist and professor emeritus at the University of Montana. Balch is best known for his studies of Heaven's Gate (with David Taylor), Aryan Nations, and the Love Family.

== Heaven's Gate ==
Balch found a UFO flyer for Heaven's Gate at a Christian coffeehouse in Sedona, Arizona. At the time Balch was on unpaid leave from University of Montana. He called up graduate student David Taylor, asking him to drop everything and move with him to California. He and Taylor joined Heaven's Gate for 3 months in the 1970s, traveling with the cult and secretly taking extensive notes on his experience before eventually leaving to go resume his life.

After leaving Heaven's Gate, Balch and Taylor published articles about Heaven's Gate. Eventually, they lost track of Heaven's Gate in the late 1970s. Balch's work as a sociologist took off from his studying of Heaven's Gate.

He held a reunion for surviving ex-members in the late 90s that included "Ti"'s daughter.

== Education ==
- Ph.D., Sociology, University of Oregon, 1972
- M.A., Sociology, Arizona State University, 1968
- B.A., Sociology, Arizona State University, 1966

== Publications ==
- 2006. "The Rise and Fall of Aryan Nations: A Resource Mobilization Perspective." Journal of Political and Military Sociology.
- 2003. "Heaven's Gate: Implications for the Study of Commitment to New Religions." pp. 122–237 in James R. Lewis, (ed.), Encyclopedic Sourcebook of UFO Religions. Amherst, NY: Prometheus. (co-author, David Taylor)
- 2002. "Making Sense of the Heaven's Gate Suicides." pp. 209–228 in David G. Bromley and J. Gordon Melton (eds.), Cults, Religion, and Violence. New York: Cambridge University Press.
- 1998. "How the Problem of Malfeasance Gets Overlooked in Studies of New Religions: An Examination of the AWARE Study of [CUT]," Robert W. Balch & Stephan Langdon in Wolves within the Fold. Anson Shupe, Ed. Rutgers.
- 1977. "Seekers and Saucers: The Role of the Cultic Milieu in Joining a UFO Cult." Rob Balch & David Taylor. American Behavioral Scientist 20, no. 6 (1977), P. 839–60.
- 1976. "Salvation in a UFO.", Robert W. Balch & David Taylor. Psychology Today 10

== Selected courses ==
- SOC 110: Principles of Sociology: Overview of the principles and concepts used in the study of human social interaction, groups, communities and societies.
- SOC 130: Sociology of Alternative Religions: Unconventional religious groups in American society. Topics include recruitment, conversion, commitment, defection, leadership, belief systems, organizational structure and change.
- SOC 201: Social Science Methods: Methods of research in the social sciences including naturalistic observation, interviewing, measurement, experiments, surveys, content analysis, and basic data analysis.
- SOC 310: Extraordinary Group Behavior: The study of emergent social behavior including rumors, crowds, crazes, riots, panics, terrorism, revolutions and social movements.
- SOC 488: Field Research Methods: The studying of people in their natural environment by observing what they do as they go about their everyday lives.

== See also ==
- List of cult and new religious movement researchers
