= Marion Goldman =

American sociologist (born 1945)

- Born: Marion Sherman Goldman; July 31, 1945 (age 81)

Academic work
- Discipline: Sociologist
- Institutions: University of Oregon
- Main interests: new religious movements, qualitative research, sociology of gender

Marion Sherman "Mimi" Goldman (born July 31, 1945) is an American sociologist who is professor emeritus of sociology and religious studies at the University of Oregon. Her research specialties include new religious movements (cults), qualitative research and sociology of gender.

== Publications ==
She has written four books, including Gold Diggers and Silver Miners: Prostitution and Social Life on the Comstock Lode, a study of frontier prostitution. Her most recent book The American Soul Rush: Esalen and the Rise of Spiritual Privilege considers how seekers at the Esalen Institute in Big Sur transformed American spirituality and psychotherapy through their economic, social, and spiritual privilege.

Her book, Passionate Journeys: Why Successful Women Joined a Cult, describes Bhagwan Shree Rajneesh’s communal city in central Oregon and the high-achieving women and men who followed him there. The book revolves around composite lives of four women—a rich housewife, a feminist community social worker, and a high fashion model—who gave up their high powered careers to follow Rajneesh. She has also co-edited two books, written numerous scholarly articles and chapters, and served on the editorial boards of Sociology of Religion and the Journal of Religion and Violence.

Goldman has been featured on a number of television programs, notably the History Channel’s Wild West Tech series with Keith Carradine, where she talked about prostitution on the mining frontier and its parallels in contemporary life.

She has observed small cultures ranging from religious communes to brothels and looked at how they affect and often change their host societies. She has consulted with COYOTE, an activist sex workers’ group, and the Information Network Focus on New Religious Movements (INFORM) in the United Kingdom.

== Bibliography ==
=== Selected books ===
- 1972. A Portrait of the Black Attorney in Chicago. Chicago: American Bar Foundation Press. Pp. 62 + ix.
- 1981. Gold Diggers and Silver Miners: Prostitution and Social Life on the Comstock Lode. Ann Arbor, MI: University of Michigan Press, Women and Culture Series. Pp. 214+ ix. ISBN 0472063324
- 1995. Sex, Schemes, and Sanctity: Religion and Deviance. Greenwich CT: JAI Press, sponsored by the Association for the Sociology of Religion. Pp. 271+viii. Edited with Mary Jo Neitz.
- 1999. Passionate Journeys: Why Successful Women Joined a Cult. Ann Arbor, MI: University of Michigan Press, 298 pp. ISBN 0472088440
- 2012. The American Soul Rush: Esalen and the Rise of Spiritual Privilege. New York: New York University Press, 240 pp. ISBN 0814732879.
