= Benjamin Zablocki =

American sociologist (1941–2020)

- Born: Benjamin David Zablocki; January 19, 1941; Brooklyn, New York, U.S.
- Died: April 6, 2020 (aged 79); New Jersey, U.S.
- Occupation: Professor of Sociology

Academic background
- Education: (BA), (PhD)
- Alma mater: Johns Hopkins University

Academic work
- Discipline: Sociologist
- Sub-discipline: Sociology of religion; Charismatic movements; Cults; Brainwashing

Benjamin David Zablocki (January 19, 1941 – April 6, 2020) was an American professor of sociology at Rutgers University where he taught sociology of religion and social psychology. He published widely on the subject of charismatic religious movements, cults, and brainwashing.

== Early life and education ==
Born in Brooklyn, New York on January 19, 1941, Zablocki received his B.A. in mathematics from Columbia University in 1962 and his Ph.D. in social relations from the Johns Hopkins University in 1967, where he studied with James S. Coleman.

== Career ==
Zablocki was the Sociology department chair at Rutgers University. He published widely on the sociology of religion.

Zablocki defined a cult as “an ideological organization held together by charismatic relationships and demanding total commitment” and advocated what he termed “the brainwashing hypothesis.” Other scholars, Zablocki noted, commonly mistake brainwashing for both a recruiting and a retaining process, when it is merely the latter. This misunderstanding enables critics of brainwashing to set up a straw-man, and thereby unfairly criticize the phenomenon of brainwashing. For evidence of the existence of brainwashing, Zablocki referred to the sheer number of testimonies from ex-members and even ex-leaders of cults. Zablocki further alleged that brainwashing has been unfairly "blacklisted" from the academic journals of sociology of religion, and such blacklisters receive funding from alleged cults and engage in corrupt practices.

== Death ==
Zablocki died April 6, 2020, at the age of 79, of cancer. His last words were "I love you, I love you, Ice Cream."

== Selected works ==
=== Books ===
- The Joyful Community: An Account of the Bruderhof: A Communal Movement Now in Its Third Generation. Chicago: University of Chicago Press (1971, reissued 1980) ISBN 0226977498
- Alienation and Charisma: A Study of Contemporary American Communes. New York: The Free Press. (1980) ISBN 0029357802
- Misunderstanding Cults: Searching for Objectivity in a Controversial Field, Toronto, University of Toronto Press, 2001. w/ Thomas Robbins (Eds.) ISBN 0802081886

=== Articles ===
- —— (October 1997). "The Blacklisting of a Concept: The Strange History of the Brainwashing Conjecture in the Sociology of Religion". Nova Religio. 1 (1): 96–121. doi:10.1525/nr.1997.1.1.96. ISSN 1092-6690.
- —— (2005). "Methodological Fallacies in Anthony's Critique of Exit Cost Analysis". Cultic Studies Review. 4 (2). ISSN 1539-0152.
- "The Birth and Death of New Religious Movements” (ca. 2005)
- “Ethics and the Modern Guru” (ca. 2016), an interview on brainwashing
