= James T. Richardson =

American sociologist

- Born: August 25, 1941 (age 85)
- Occupations: Professor, author

Academic background
- Education: Texas Tech University (B.A., M.A.); Washington State University (Ph.D.); Nevada School of Law (J.D.)

James T. Richardson (born August 25, 1941) is Emeritus Foundation Professor of Sociology and Judicial Studies at the University of Nevada, Reno. He is a sociologist with legal training, who has edited and co-edited over a dozen books and has authored more than 300 scholarly journal articles and book chapters. Areas in which he is specialized include the sociology of religion, the sociology of law, religion and human rights, social control of religions, social psychology of law, social and behavioral science evidence, and treatment of Muslims in courts. Richardson has been an outstanding figure in American sociology of religion for decades, and is considered to be one of the most prominent figures in the field of law and religion in the World. He is also a known scientific critic of brainwashing theories.

== Education and career ==
Prof. Richardson received his B.A. in sociology from Texas Tech University in 1965, M.A. in sociology from Texas Tech University in 1966, Ph.D. in sociology from Washington State University in 1968, and Doctor of Jurisprudence (J.D.) from Old College, Nevada School of Law in 1986.

He has served as president of the Association for the Sociology of Religion, Society for the Scientific Study of Religion, and the national president of the American Association of University Professors. He has been the former director of Grant Sawyer Center for Justice Studies at the UNR (1992–2014), and has directed the Judicial Studies graduate degree program for trial judges since 1988 as well as the Justice Management online graduate degree program since 2005 at that university before his retirement in 2016.

== Selected bibliography ==
- Fokas, Effie, and J.T. Richardson (eds.). (2018). The European Court of Human Rights and Minority Religions: Messages Generated and Messages Received. London: Routledge.
- Possamai, Adam, Richardson, J.T., and B.S. Turner (eds.). (2015). The Sociology of Shari’a: Case Studies from around the World. New York: Springer.
- Possamai, Adam, Richardson, J.T., and B.S. Turner (eds.). (2014). Legal Pluralism and Shari’a Law. London: Routledge.
- Richardson, J.T., and Francois Bellanger (eds.). (2014) Legal Cases Involving New Religions and Minority Faiths. Aldershot: Ashgate.
- Wright, S.A., and J.T. Richardson (eds.). (2011). Saints under Siege: The Raid on the Fundamentalist Latter Day Saints in Texas. New York: New York University Press.
- Beckford, J.A., and J.T. Richardson (eds.). (2004). Challenging Religion: Essays in Honour of Eileen Barker. New York: Taylor & Francis.
- Richardson, J.T., Best, Joel, and D.G. Bromley (eds.). (1991). The Satanism Scare. Piscataway, New Jersey: Transaction Publishers.
