= Armageddon in Waco =

Anthology on the Waco siege

Armageddon in Waco: Critical Perspectives on the Branch Davidian Conflict
- Editor: Stuart A. Wright
- Language: English
- Genre: non-fiction anthology
- Publisher: University of Chicago Press
- Publication date: 1995
- Pages: 394 + xxvi
- ISBN: 9780226908458
- OCLC: 909488031

Armageddon in Waco: Critical Perspectives on the Branch Davidian Conflict is a 1995 non-fiction anthology book on the Waco siege edited by Stuart A. Wright. It was published by the University of Chicago Press.

The book is separated into six parts. The first, "Social and Historical Context of the Branch Davidians", contains essays by Robert S. Fogarty, William L. Pitts, David G. Bromley, and Edward Silver. The second, "Sources and Development of Conflict", contains essays by Wright, James R. Lewis, Christopher C. Ellison, and John Bartkowski. The third, "Media Coverage and Public Opinion", contains essays by James T. Richardson, Anson Shupe, and Jeffrey K. Hadden. The fourth, "Apocalypticism, Religious Marginality, and Violence", contains essays by John R. Hall, Thomas Robbins, and Dick Anthony. The fifth, "Scholars, Experts, and Law Enforcement", contains essays by James D. Tabor and Nancy Ammerman. The last part, "Legal and Policy Issues", contains essays by Rhys H. Williams, Edward McGlynn Caffney, and Dean M. Kelley.

== Reception ==
Catherine Wessinger in Nova Religio compliment's Stuart A. Wright's introduction to the book, but she was immediately disappointed by the seemingly irrelevant first chapter on Seventh-day Adventist and early Branch Davidian history. Her opinions on the other essays vary, but overall she things that the book is full of "hard-hitting essays" despite the "scholarly and professional" style. William A. Stahl in Sociology of Religion also noted that the essays are "uneven" in the work, but overall it is a "valuable resource" for understanding the Waco siege and the broader context of new religious movements in the United States.

Richard Kyle in Church History compliments the book's challenging of "simplistic" depictions of the Waco siege and the Branch Davidians. However, he doubted the importance of anti-cult organizations in the federal government's actions and public opinion. Eugene V. Gallagher in CrossCurrents calls the work "doubly important" since it was an event in recent history that inspired and informed the understanding of other events like the Oklahoma City bombing.

Michael S. Cummings in Utopian Studies called the book a "fair-minded polemic" (emphasis in original) because of the scholars' narrative of the failure of the federal government during the siege. He criticizes the somewhat prevalent sociological jargon in the work in addition to some of the conclusions that the scholars make about what the cause was for the strength of the government's response. Overall, though, he recommended the book as a "good read".

Jeffrey Kaplan in the Law and History Review found the anthology disappointing in some aspects. He thinks some of the book's parts are only for academic interests "in the narrowest sense of the term". He notes that the anthology fails to account for the larger impact of the Waco siege on American politics, law, and religion. Jacob Sullum in Reason magazine noted that the anthology is "sometimes dry and repetitive" but otherwise informative.

Renee Brodie in Religious Studies and Theology criticizes the lack of essays that present support for the government's actions in the Waco siege. Brodie compliments Pitts's essay in particular for valuable historical contributions to the discussion and Lewis's essay on the anti-cult movement's influence on the media (but points out that the lack of an anti-cult perspective in the anthology does not deliver on the book's namesake of providing "critical perspectives").
