= From the Ashes: Making Sense of Waco =

Non-fiction anthology on the Waco siege

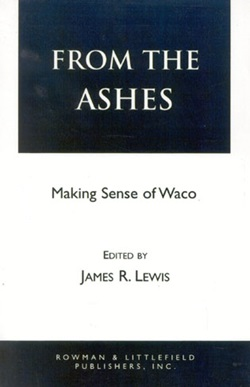
- Editor: James R. Lewis
- Language: English
- Subject: The Branch Davidians
- Publisher: Rowman & Littlefield
- Publication date: 1994
- Pages: 269 + xvi
- ISBN: 0-8476-7915-2
- OCLC: 29548237
- Dewey Decimal: 976.4/284063
- LC Class: BP605.B72 F76 1994

From the Ashes: Making Sense of Waco is a 1994 edited volume edited by James R. Lewis about the Waco siege. It was published by Rowman & Littlefield. The book contains 46 essays from people like Franklin Littell, Stuart A. Wright, David G. Bromley, Thomas Robbins, Dick Anthony, James A. Beckford, James T. Richardson. Some of the essays are scholarly articles, while others are opinion pieces. Other contents include press releases, personal correspondences, and a poem from a surviving Branch Davidian. Catherine Wessinger notes in her review of the book that it was a chance for new religious movement scholars to respond to the siege.

== Contents ==
The book contains 46 essays from people like Franklin Littell, Stuart A. Wright, David G. Bromley, Thomas Robbins, Dick Anthony, James A. Beckford, James T. Richardson, Dean M. Kelley, and Eldridge Cleaver. Some of the essays are scholarly articles, while others are opinion pieces. Other contents include press releases, personal correspondences, and a poem from a surviving Branch Davidian.

== Contributors ==
- Dick Anthony
- J. Phillip Arnold
- George Baker
- Michael Barkun
- James A. Beckford
- Charlie Beckwith
- R. W. Bradford
- Martha Sonntag Bradley
- David G. Bromley
- Eldridge Cleaver
- Chas S. Clifton
- Phyllis Goldberg
- Charles L. Harper
- Robert C. Hicks
- Constance A. Jones
- Jeffrey Kaplan
- Dean M. Kelley
- Laura Murphy Lee
- Edward C. Lehman, Jr.
- James R. Lewis
- Larry Lilliston
- Franklin H. Littell
- Phillip Lucas
- I. Lamar Maffett
- Thomas McGowan
- Timothy Miller
- Andrew Milne
- Evelyn Dorothy Oliver
- Moorman Oliver, Jr.
- Susan J. Palmer
- Bill Pitts
- James T. Richardson
- Thomas Robbins
- George Robertson
- Larry D. Shinn
- William H. Swatos, Jr.
- James D. Tabor
- Catherine Wessinger
- Stuart A. Wright
- Michael York

== Publication ==
From the Ashes was published in 1994 by Rowman & Littlefield. Editor James R. Lewis was then academic director of the Association of World Academics for Religious Education.

== Reception ==
H. Newton Malony for the International Journal for the Psychology of Religion called the book a "service" to the public for its compilation of materials and criticisms of the Cult Awareness Network's influence over the federal government during the Waco siege in particular. However, he criticized Lewis for having a biased perspective on the topic, specifically against the federal government's actions.

Catherine Wessinger for Nova Religio compliments the work for including military and law enforcement perspectives. She notes that essays by Robert D. Hicks and Charlie Beckwith are valuable, but one by Moorman Oliver, Jr., is "filled with incorrect allegations of fact". She notes in her review of the book that it was a chance for new religious movement scholars to respond to the siege.

Anson Shupe for the Journal for the Scientific Study of Religion criticizes the book for its strange colloquial tone which makes "metaphors and similes that at times border on the irresponsible" like comparing the Branch Davidians to the Holocaust or the Native American genocide, among other things. He also thinks the project was weakened by its improper timing – which prevented its contributors to use informative government reports – and the hyperbolic and ominous tone.

James A. Mathisen for Review of Religious Research criticized the work for not having a specific audience in mind when being edited together. He recommended libraries with smaller budgets to "wait for Armageddon in Waco: Critical Perspectives on the Branch Davidian Conflict (1995) to compare before" spending the money for only a few particularly good articles.

Blake W. Burleson for The San Francisco Jung Institute Library Journal believes that some of the contributors are like Carl Jung's "cultural enthusiasts" in that they exhibit "naïve belief in human innocence, or, in this case, religious innocence". He criticizes some contributors for going "great lengths" to defend David Koresh, leader of the Branch Davidians.
