= Why Waco? =

1995 book on the Waco siege

Why Waco?: Cults and the Battle for Religious Freedom in America
- Cover
- Authors: James D. Tabor, Eugene V. Gallagher
- Language: English
- Publisher: University of California Press
- Publication date: 1995
- Pages: 268
- ISBN: 9780585054742
- OCLC: 42855061

Why Waco?: Cults and the Battle for Religious Freedom in America is a 1995 non-fiction book written by James D. Tabor and Eugene V. Gallagher on the Waco siege and the anti-cult movement in America. It was published by the University of California Press. The same press reprinted it in 1997 in paperback. The appendix of the book contains an unfinished manuscript written by David Koresh, the leader of the Branch Davidians, on the Seven seals in the Book of Revelation. The appendix has a preface written by Tabor and J. Phillip Arnold. The manuscript was obtained from a survivor of the fire, Ruth Riddle. The final pages of the book provide a list of Branch Davidians who died in the 28 February 1993 raid, the 19 April 1993 fire, and who survived.

According to David Edwin Harrell, Tabor and Gallagher argue in their book that the Bureau of Alcohol, Tobacco, and Firearms, Federal Bureau of Investigation, and other federal agencies failed to assess the situation properly and executed a "heavy-handed" plan, informed by "experts who, according to [Tabor and Gallagher], had no interest in or knowledge of the religious nuances of the situation".

== Reception ==
Bill Piekarski for the Library Journal called the book both "sober" and "sobering", and he recommended it for academic and church libraries. A reviewer for Publishers Weekly believes the authors make a "compelling case that the confrontation was avoidable and could have been resolved peacefully".

Bill Pitts for the Journal of Church and State calls the book a "welcome volume" and a "well-argued assault on prejudice against new religious movements". Catherine Wessinger for Nova Religio believes that Tabor and Gallagher provide the "best presentation of David Koresh's teachings and interpretations of the Bible". She compliments Tabor and Gallagher's avoidance of "demonizing the Davidian apostate, Marc Breault, who was instrumental in shaping how the [Bureau of Alcohol, Tobacco, and Firearms (ATF)] and [Federal Bureau of Investigation (FBI)] agents saw Koresh and the Davidians". Jacob Sullum for Reason wrote that the book "eloquently and persuasively" argue their thesis.

Leo P. Ribuffo for The Christian Century said that the book could be useful even for those who agree with its thesis. Ribuffo compliments the book's "good introduction" to Koresh and the Branch Davidians, but he criticizes their focus on the ATF and FBI's dismissal of the group as a cult. Stuart A. Wright for CrossCurrents called the book a "detailed description of events" before the siege, and he compliments it as a "commendable effort" to describe the Waco siege in a greater American religious landscape, particularly involving the anti-cult movement.

Dean M. Kelley for the Journal for the Scientific Study of Religion, in comparing it to other books about the Waco siege, noted that the book devoted little space to the actual event itself and more to the actors' intentions, beliefs, etc. David Edwin Harrell for The Journal of American History wrote that the book "provided a needed balance to the avalanche of sensational journalism about Waco and sometimes the frightening tactics of the cultbusters". He commended the authors for focusing on "the constitutional questions raised by the Waco raid in particular and by cultbusting in general", but criticizes their characterization of Koresh that "falls short of making him either intelligent or pious". Mary Carroll in Booklist calls the book a "useful but far from balanced presentation" of Koresh and the Branch Davidians.

Charles H. Lippy for the Journal of American Studies compared the work to Mark S. Hamm's Apocalypse in Oklahoma: Waco and Ruby Ridge Revenged – which documents and analyzes the law-enforcement responses to the Branch Davidians and the Christian Identity white power activist who lived in Ruby Ridge, Idaho – and noted that Tabor and Gallagher saw the "symbolic dimension" of the Waco siege: it symbolizes how "misunderstanding the dynamics of emergent religions becomes an assault on religious freedom". Jim Bencivenga for The Christian Science Monitor wrote that the book's discussion of cults "transcends" then-current Congressional hearings on the Waco siege.
