= James R. Lewis (scholar) =

American academic (1949–2022)

- Lewis, c. 2022
- Born: James Roger Lewis; November 3, 1949; Leonardtown, Maryland, US
- Died: October 11, 2022 (aged 72); United States
- Occupations: Sociologist of religion and writer
- Spouse: Evelyn Oliver
- Children: 3

Academic background
- Education: University of Wales, Lampeter (PhD)

Academic work
- Main interests: Astrology; New Age; academic study of new religious movements
- Website: jamesrlewis.info

James Roger Lewis (November 3, 1949 – October 11, 2022) was an American philosophy professor at Wuhan University. He was a religious studies scholar, sociologist of religion, and writer, who specialized in the academic study of new religious movements, and New Age. Lewis received his BA in philosophy and religious studies from Appalachian State University, going on to study at University of North Carolina at Chapel Hill, where he received a master's degree. He received a PhD in religious studies from the University of Wales, Lampeter in 2003.

Lewis formed the academic association AWARE in 1992, which he dissolved in 1995 over concerns from its advisory board. He was an assistant professor at the University of Wisconsin–Milwaukee from 2003 to 2009, and was associate professor of religious studies at the University of Tromsø from 2010 to 2013, before becoming a professor at Wuhan University.

He was on the editorial boards of, among others, the journals Marburg Journal of Religion and the Journal of Religion and Violence. Lewis authored and edited several books, particularly ones about religious topics, including new religious movements, Scientology, Satanism, and other religious studies topics, but also terrorism and radicalization.

== Early life and education ==
James Roger Lewis was born November 3, 1949, in Leonardtown, Maryland, and raised in New Port Richey, Florida. He had a brother and a sister. He studied pre-med at the University of South Florida, but abandoned it to, as he described it, "go questing after myself".

He left to join Yogi Bhajan's 3HO, a new religious movement combining the teachings of kundalini yoga and Sikhism. In this period he worked as a freelance yoga teacher and wrote a book entitled Yoga for Couples, the first book he would write. He was a member throughout the early and mid-1970s. Feeling disenchanted with the organization, he formed a small and short-lived breakaway movement.

After leaving 3HO, he returned to his studies. Lewis graduated summa cum laude from Appalachian State University in 1981, with a BA in philosophy and religious studies, later graduating from University of North Carolina at Chapel Hill with a master's degree in Religious Studies in 1987. Lewis received his PhD in religious studies from the University of Wales, Lampeter, in 2003.

== Career ==
After graduating from the University of North Carolina, Lewis moved to Santa Barbara, California, to assist new religious movement scholar J. Gordon Melton with his research projects. He pursued a career as a professional reference book writer in the 1990s. He wrote general reference encyclopedias on a variety of subjects, including apocalypticism, new religious movements, dreams, and astrology. From 1993 to 1995, he produced four general reference books for Gale Research: The Astrology Encyclopedia, Encyclopedia of Afterlife Beliefs and Phenomena, The Dream Encyclopedia, and Angels A to Z.

In 1992, Lewis formed an academic association called AWARE, with the primary goal "to promote intellectual and religious freedom by educating the general public about existing religions and cultures, including, but not limited to, alternative religious groups." Describing its outlook as "scholarly and non-sectarian", AWARE stated that it sought to educate scholars and the general public about the persecution of religious and cultural minorities in the United States and abroad, and to assist the United States in its efforts to counter prejudice.

Other scholars involved in the formulation of AWARE as an "anti-anti-cult organization" included Eileen Barker, David G. Bromley, and Jeffrey Hadden, who felt a need for an organization of academics prepared to appear as expert witnesses in court cases. AWARE proved controversial; critics complained that Lewis associated too closely with NRM members, and Lewis dissolved the body in December 1995 after concerns from members of its advisory board.

In May 1995, Lewis, fellow scholar J. Gordon Melton and religious freedom lawyer Barry Fisher had flown to Japan in the early stages of investigations into the sarin gas attack on the Tokyo subway to voice their concern that police behaviour, including mass detentions without charge and the removal of practitioners' children from the group, might be infringing the civil rights of Aum Shinrikyo members. They had travelled to Japan at the invitation and expense of Aum Shinrikyo after they had contacted the group to express concern over developments, and met with officials over a period of three days. While not having been given access to the group's chemical laboratories, they held press conferences in Japan stating their belief, based on the documentation they had been given by the group, that the group did not have the ability to produce sarin and was being scapegoated. Lewis likened the group's treatment to a Japanese Waco. The scholars' defense of Aum Shinrikyo led to a crisis of confidence in religious scholarship when the group turned out to have been responsible for the attack after all.

In 2003 he became an assistant professor at University of Wisconsin–Milwaukee, and in 2009 at the University of Wales Trinity Saint David, where he became an honorary senior research fellow. He taught in the University of Wisconsin System, and, on an adjunct basis, at DePaul University. Lewis was an associate professor of religious studies at the University of Tromsø from 2010 to 2013 before becoming a professor at Wuhan University in Wuhan, Hubei, China.

Lewis was on the editorial boards of the journals Marburg Journal of Religion (from 2001 to his death), Fieldwork in Religion (from 2005 until his death), JASANAS (from 2005 to 2011, Cultural Analysis (from 2011 until his death), International Journal for the Study of New Religions (from 2012 until his death), Journal of Religion and Violence (from 2013 until his death), Open Theology (from 2017 until his death), Chaos: Scandinavian Journal of Studies in History of Religions (from 2015 until his death), ColomboArts (from 2017 until his death).

While in China, he studied Chinese new religious movements (NRMs) and founded the Wuhan Journal of Cultic Studies. He was a co-founder of the International Society for the Study of New Religions and editor-in-chief of the Alternative Spirituality and Religion Review (ASRR).

In a December 2017 conference, Lewis was quoted by Xinhua News Agency as claiming that Falun Gong-founded media Sound of Hope and New Tang Dynasty Television "are in fact manipulated and sponsored by international anti-China forces". Lewis himself criticized his prior, initially sympathetic approach to the Falun Gong organization, saying he had been "naive" about the group and that after contacting ex-members and Chinese critics of the organization he believed his old feelings of outrage over treatment of the Falun Gong to be "naive and foolish".

== Reception ==
His works focused on several NRMs, as well as religion and violence, radicalization, and terrorism. He edited several encyclopedias and reference works on these topics. A prolific author, Lewis won a Choice Outstanding Academic Titles award in 1999 for Cults in America. The Choice review described it as a "very readable book" that offered a "balanced overview of controversies centering on cults in America", containing basic information on several dozen groups, as well as the more general conflict between "anti-cultists" seeking government assistance to eliminate cults, and religious "libertarians" defending religious liberty even for disliked groups. The review stated that while Lewis differed with the anti-cult view, he presented "arguments and references from both sides – respectfully and in language free from insinuation or invective. Strongly recommended".

Lewis won another Choice Outstanding Academic Title award for The Oxford Handbook of New Religious Movements, with a second edition of this handbook published in 2016 with Inga Tøllefsen as co-editor. The Astrology Encyclopedia received honors from the New York Public Library and the American Library Association. A reviewer described his 1990s reference books on such topics as having sobriety and readability in a topic that is usually "crystal ball fluff".

The work of AWARE in the 1990s, led by Lewis, was criticized by Benjamin Beit-Hallahmi, who alleged that the organization was disseminating movement "propaganda", and used poor research methods. This echoed earlier criticisms in a Skeptic article by Stephen A. Kent and Theresa Krebs, who felt that materials produced by Lewis and J. Gordon Melton on the Church Universal and Triumphant and The Family in their joint work Sex, Slander, and Salvation, were "as much an apology as a social scientific product".

Anson Shupe and Susan E. Darnell characterised Kent's and Krebs' paper as an ad-hominem attack, and part of a pattern of accusing scholars of bias when their field research produced findings at variance with anti-cult stereotypes. Melton defended their joint work, stating that far from being a public relations exercise, the AWARE report on the Church Universal and Triumphant had "startled and upset" the group's leadership, and led to wide-ranging changes in the organization.

Jeffrey Kaplan stated that the aims of AWARE had been "laudable", but that the risks involved for academics in joining the "cult wars", as well as the organization's apparently unsuccessful appeals for funding from new religious movements, led to controversy. Further criticism was directed at Lewis from Kent and Kayla Swanson, who accused him of falsely claiming to have earned a PhD from the University of North Carolina, Chapel Hill.

In 2018, Lewis authored Falun Gong: Spiritual Warfare and Martyrdom. The book covers various aspects of the group, focusing primarily on the more controversial teachings of the Falun Gong and its leader Li Hongzhi, including the group's pattern of targeting critics and Lewis's changing opinions on the group. Reviewer Huang Chao praised the book, positively comparing it to David Ownby's work on the group, Falun Gong and the Future of China, which Chao argued downplayed negative aspects of the Falun Gong. He said that Lewis's book was important in correcting these weaknesses "by highlighting these aspects without degenerating into an anti-cult diatribe." Chao criticized Lewis's treatment of Hongzhi's "self-aggrandizing assertions", which he thought was overly lengthy and did not contribute much to the stated purpose of the book (the violent side of the group), though he described his criticisms of the book overall as "relatively minor".

Another reviewer, Heather Kavan, praised the book for its content and style. Kavan argued that supporters of the group may find the book "confronting", saying that though Lewis did not support the treatment of the group, he did not whitewash the harmful beliefs of the group; she noted the book could have been subtitled "Why it is unwise to join Falun Gong."

Lewis edited Enlightened Martyrdom: The Hidden Side of Falun Gong (2019), alongside Huang Chao. Lewis argues in the book's final chapter that due to the media strategies of the group, they were presented largely sympathetically, but the tides were turning and they would soon be viewed as a dangerous group. Reviewer Carole M. Cusack recommended the book, though described the chapters as "of uneven quality". She described the book as timely due to the change in public opinion of the group at the time of its publication, with more coverage of the leader and the group's beliefs instead of previously sympathetic stories.

== Personal life and death ==
Lewis was married to Evelyn Oliver, whom he met circa 1990 at a psychology and astrology conference. Before ever meeting him, she had bought his first book, Yoga for Couples. Oliver was his business partner in his encyclopedia-writing efforts. They had three daughters.

Lewis died on October 11, 2022, in the United States, after suffering a cardiac arrest from respiratory failure.

== Bibliography ==
=== Written ===
- —— (1979). Yoga for Couples. Brookline: Autumn Press. ISBN 0-394-73778-4.
- —— (1994). The Astrology Encyclopedia. Detroit: Gale Research. ISBN 0-8103-8900-2.
  - —— (2003). The Astrology Book: The Encyclopedia of Heavenly Influences. Detroit: Visible Ink Press. ISBN 0-7808-0719-7.
- —— (1995). Encyclopedia of Afterlife Beliefs and Phenomena. Detroit: Visible Ink Press. ISBN 0-7876-0288-4.
- —— (1995). The Dream Encyclopedia (1st ed.). Detroit: Visible Ink Press. ISBN 1-57859-015-9.
  - ——; Oliver, Evelyn Dorothy (2009). The Dream Encyclopedia (2nd ed.). Detroit: Visible Ink Press. ISBN 978-1-57859-216-6.
- —— (1995). Encyclopedia of Death and the Afterlife (1st ed.). Detroit: Visible Ink Press. ISBN 1-57859-107-4.
  - —— (2001). The Death and Afterlife Book: The Encyclopedia of Death, Near Death, and Life After Death (2nd ed.). Detroit: Visible Ink Press. ISBN 1-57859-135-X.
- ——; Oliver, Evelyn Dorothy (1995). Angels A to Z (1st ed.). Detroit: Visible Ink Press. ISBN 0-7876-0652-9.
  - Oliver, Evelyn Dorothy; —— (2008). Angels A to Z (2nd ed.). Detroit: Visible Ink Press. ISBN 978-1-57859-212-8.
- —— (1998). Peculiar Prophets: A Biographical Dictionary of New Religions. St. Paul: Paragon House. ISBN 1-55778-768-9.
- —— (1998). Seeking the Light: Uncovering the Truth About the Movement of Spiritual Inner Awareness and Its Founder John-Roger. Los Angeles: Mandeville Press. ISBN 0-914829-42-4.
- —— (1998). Cults in America: A Reference Handbook (1st ed.). Santa Barbara: ABC-CLIO. ISBN 1-57607-031-X.
  - —— (2005). Cults: A Reference Handbook (2nd ed.). Santa Barbara: ABC-CLIO. ISBN 1-85109-618-3.
  - —— (2014). Cults: A Reference and Guide (3rd ed.). London: Routledge. ISBN 978-1-84553-973-3.
- —— (1999). Witchcraft Today: An Encyclopedia of Wiccan and Neopagan Traditions. Santa Barbara: ABC-CLIO. ISBN 1-57607-134-0.
- —— (2000). UFOs and Popular Culture: An Encyclopedia of Contemporary Myth. Santa Barbara: ABC-CLIO. ISBN 1-57607-265-7.
- —— (2000). Doomsday Prophecies: A Complete Guide to the End of the World. Amherst: Prometheus Books. ISBN 1-57392-690-6.
- ——; Skutsch, Carl (2001). The Human Rights Encyclopedia. Armonk: Sharpe Reference. ISBN 0-7656-8023-8.
- —— (2002). Satanism Today: An Encyclopedia of Religion, Folklore, and Popular Culture. Santa Barbara: ABC-CLIO. ISBN 1-57607-292-4.
- —— (2003). Legitimating New Religions. New Brunswick: Rutgers University Press. ISBN 0-8135-3323-6.
- ——; Levine, Nicholas M. (2010). Children of Jesus and Mary: The Order of Christ Sophia. New York: Oxford University Press. ISBN 978-0-19-537844-3.
- Tumminia, Diana; —— (2013). A Study of the Movement of Spiritual Inner Awareness: Religious Innovation and Cultural Change. New York: Palgrave Macmillan. ISBN 978-1-349-47687-9.
- —— (2014). Sects and Stats: Overturning the Conventional Wisdom about Cult Members. Equinox Publishing. ISBN 978-1-78179-108-0.
- Dyrendal, Asbjørn; ——; Petersen, Jasper Aa. (2016). The Invention of Satanism. New York: Oxford University Press. ISBN 978-0-19-518110-4. ISSN 2514-3786.
- —— (2018). Falun Gong: Spiritual Warfare and Martyrdom. Cambridge Elements. Cambridge University Press. ISBN 978-1-108-44565-8. ISSN 2514-3786.

=== Edited ===
- ——, ed. (1990). Theosophy I: The Inner Life of Theosophy. New York: Garland Publishing. ISBN 0-8240-4367-7.
- ——, ed. (1990). The Beginnings of Astrology in America: Astrology and the Re-emergence of Cosmic Religion. New York: Garland Publishing. ISBN 0-8240-4364-2.
- ——, ed. (1990). The Unification Church: Outreach. Vol. 3. New York: Garland Publishing. ISBN 0-8240-4489-4.
- ——; Melton, J. Gordon, eds. (1992). Perspectives on the New Age. Albany: State University of New York Press. ISBN 0-7914-1213-X.
- ——, ed. (1994). From the Ashes: Making Sense of Waco. Rowman & Littlefield. ISBN 0-8476-7915-2.
- ——; Melton, J. Gordon, eds. (1994). Church Universal and Triumphant: In Scholarly Perspective. Stanford: Center for Academic Publication.
- ——; Melton, J. Gordon, eds. (1994). Sex, Slander, and Salvation: Investigating The Family/Children of God. Stanford: Center for Academic Publication. ISBN 0-9639501-2-6.
- ——, ed. (1995). The Gods Have Landed: New Religions from Other Worlds. Albany: State University of New York Press. ISBN 0-7914-2329-8.
- ——, ed. (1996). Magical Religion and Modern Witchcraft. Albany: State University of New York Press. ISBN 0-7914-2889-3.
- ——, ed. (1998). The Encyclopedia of Cults, Sects, and New Religions (1st ed.). Amherst: Prometheus Books. ISBN 1-57392-222-6.
  - ——, ed. (2002). The Encyclopedia of Cults, Sects, and New Religions (2nd ed.). Amherst: Prometheus Books. ISBN 1-57392-888-7.
- ——, ed. (2001). Odd Gods: New Religions and the Cult Controversy. Amherst: Prometheus Books. ISBN 1-57392-842-9.
- Rabinovitch, Shelley; ——, eds. (2002). The Encyclopedia of Modern Witchcraft and Neo-Paganism. New York City: Citadel Press. ISBN 978-0-806-52406-1.
- ——, ed. (2003). Encyclopedic Sourcebook of UFO Religions. Amherst: Prometheus Books. ISBN 1-57392-964-6.
- ——, ed. (2004). The Oxford Handbook of New Religious Movements. New York: Oxford University Press. ISBN 0-19-514986-6.
- ——, ed. (2004). The Encyclopedic Sourcebook of New Age Religions. Amherst: Prometheus Books. ISBN 1-59102-040-9.
- ——; Petersen, Jesper Aagaard, eds. (2004). Controversial New Religions (1st ed.). New York: Oxford University Press. ISBN 0-19-515682-X.
  - ——; Petersen, Jesper Aagaard, eds. (2014). Controversial New Religions (2nd ed.). New York: Oxford University Press. ISBN 978-0-19-931531-4.
- ——, ed. (2006). The Order of the Solar Temple: The Temple of Death. Ashgate Publishing. ISBN 0-7546-5285-8.
- ——; Petersen, Jesper Aagaard, eds. (2006). The Encyclopedic Sourcebook of Satanism. Amherst: Prometheus Books. ISBN 1-59102-390-4.
- Kemp, Daren; ——, eds. (2007). Handbook of New Age. Leiden: Brill Publishers. ISBN 978-90-04-15355-4.
- ——; Hammer, Olav, eds. (2008). The Invention of Sacred Tradition. Cambridge University Press. ISBN 978-0-521-86479-4.
- ——; Lewis, Sarah M., eds. (2009). Sacred Schisms. Cambridge University Press. ISBN 978-0-521-88147-0.
- ——, ed. (2009). Scientology. Oxford University Press. ISBN 978-0-19-533149-3.
- ——; Pizza, Murphy, eds. (2009). Handbook of Contemporary Paganism. Leiden: Brill Publishers. ISBN 978-90-04-16373-7.
- ——; Hammer, Olav, eds. (2010). Handbook of Religion and the Authority of Science. Leiden: Brill Publishers. ISBN 978-90-04-18791-7.
- ——; Levine, Nicholas M. (2010). Children of Jesus and Mary: The Order of Christ Sophia. New York: Oxford University Press. ISBN 978-0-19-537844-3.
- ——, ed. (2011). Violence and New Religious Movements. Oxford University Press. ISBN 978-0-19-973563-1.
- ——; Cusack, Carole M., eds. (2014). Sacred Suicide. Ashgate Publishing. ISBN 978-1-4094-5086-3.
- ——; Andreassen, Bengt-Ove, eds. (2014). Textbook Gods: Genre, Text and Teaching Religious Studies. Sheffield: Equinox Publishing. ISBN 978-1-78179-054-0.
- Kraft, Siv Ellen; Fonneland, Trude; ——, eds. (2015). Nordic Neoshamanisms. New York: Palgrave Macmillan. ISBN 978-1-4129-1195-5.
- ——; Tøllefsen, Inga B., eds. (2015). Handbook of Nordic New Religions. Leiden: Brill Publishers. ISBN 978-90-04-29244-4.
- Bogdan, Henrik; ——, eds. (2015). Sexuality and New Religious Movements. New York: Palgrave Macmillan. ISBN 978-1-137-38643-4.
- ——; Tøllefsen, Inga B., eds. (2016). The Oxford Handbook of New Religious Movements: Volume II. New York: Oxford University Press. ISBN 978-0-19-046617-6.
- Gilhus, Ingvild Sælid; Fonneland, Kraft; ——, eds. (2016). New Age in Norway. Sheffield: Equinox Publishing. ISBN 978-1-78179-417-3.
- Feraro, Shai; ——, eds. (2017). Contemporary Alternative Spiritualities in Israel. New York: Palgrave Macmillan. ISBN 978-1-137-54741-5.
- ——; Andreassen, Bengt-Ove; Thobro, Suzanne Anett, eds. (2017). Textbook Violence. Sheffield: Equinox Publishing. ISBN 978-1-78179-258-2.
- ——; Hellesøy, Kjersti, eds. (2017). Handbook of Scientology. Leiden: Brill Publishers. ISBN 978-90-04-32871-6.
- ——, ed. (2017). The Cambridge Companion to Religion and Terrorism. Cambridge University Press. ISBN 978-1-316-50562-5.
- ——; Chao, Huang, eds. (2019). Enlightened Martyrdom: The Hidden Side of Falun Gong. Equinox Publishing. ISBN 978-1-78179-499-9.
- Awan, Akil N.; ——, eds. (2024). Radicalisation: A Global and Comparative Perspective. New York: Oxford University Press. ISBN 978-0-19-777126-6. (published posthumously)
