= Controversial New Religions =

2004 book by James R. Lewis and Jesper Aagaard Petersen

- Cover of the first edition
- Editor: James R. Lewis; Jesper Aagaard Petersen
- Language: English
- Published: 2004 (OUP); 2014 (OUP)
- Publisher: Oxford University Press
- Publication date: December 9, 2004
- Publication place: United States
- Pages: 480 (1st), 483 (2nd)
- ISBN: 0-19-515682-X 978-0-19-931531-4 (2nd)
- OCLC: 53398162
- Dewey Decimal: 200
- LC Class: BP603 .C66 2005

Controversial New Religions is an edited volume discussing new religious movements, or cults, that have resulted in controversy. It was co-edited by James R. Lewis and Jesper Aagaard Petersen, and was first published in 2004 by Oxford University Press. A second edition containing mostly new content was published with the same two editors in 2014. The first edition contains 19 essays, while the second contains 22. Both editions are divided into four sections by topic, and cover numerous groups.

Both editions contain content on Western or Christian inspired new religious movements like the Unification Church or the Peoples Temple, in addition to Asian-derived groups like the Falun Gong, the Rajneesh movement and Aum Shinrikyo. Groups related to western esoteric and New Age concepts are also subject to discussion: the Church of Scientology and the Order of the Solar Temple are covered in both volumes, as are unclassified other groups like Heaven's Gate and Raëlism.

Reviews for both editions were generally positive, though some reviewers described it as a typical example in this field. One reviewer raised criticisms of unevenness in the point of view and level of assumed prior to knowledge from chapter to chapter in the collection, though generally the book was viewed as a valuable resource.

== Contents ==
=== 1st edition (2004) ===
An introduction by the two editors opens with the history of the academic study of new religious movements (NRMs) as a field: until the Jonestown massacres in 1978, they were rarely studied, with few specialists in the field. Even after the events at Jonestown, it remained an obscure field, until in the 1990s there was a string of high profile extremely violent incidents associated with NRMs. As a result of these incidents the field grew in popularity and was accepted as a legitimate aspect of the field of religious studies. However, Lewis notes, the category of "NRMs" is a residual one without clear defining traits as to what groups were relevant to it. Then follows a "survey of contents" summarizing the chapters.

The first section follows several "Groups in the Christian Tradition": The Family International, the Unification Church, the Peoples Temple, and the Branch Davidians. James Chancellor goes over the highly controversial Family International, including its background and religious beliefs, before Beverly focuses on the Unification Church, particularly recent events and the founder Sun Myung Moon. Rebecca Moore covers the Peoples Temple, notorious for the Jonestown massacre, discussing the conspiracy theories that have circulated around the events. Another group that ended in large scale violence, the Branch Davidians — many of whom died with their leader David Koresh at the end of the Waco siege — have their perception by the media narrative be the focus in a chapter by Stuart A. Wright.

In "Asian and Asian-inspired Groups" covers the Rajneesh movement, ISKCON, Soka Gakkai, Aum Shinrikyo, the Falun Gong, and the Aumists. E. Burke Rochford, Jr. discusses family life and change within ISKCON, a Hinduism-based NRM; then Marion S. Goldman analyzes the history of Osho's movement, notorious for several controversies including several acts of attempted murder and terrorism, arguing that despite is controversies it has stabilized and continued to exist through strategies for managing controversy. Soka Gakkai, a controversial Buddhist organization active in many countries, is outlined in history and political activity by Robert Kisala. Martin Repp analyzes what led to the crimes committed by another Buddhist group, Aum Shinrikyo, that engaged in multiple murders and acts of terrorism. He considers both internal and external factors, also giving a background of the history and existing literature. The Falun Gong, a group that is highly controversial and persecuted within China, has its relationship to the concept of qigong and other strands of traditional Chinese religion profiled by David Ownby, before the religious blending of the Aumists, a Hindu-based faith that eventually incorporated many other elements, is covered by PierLuigi Zoccatelli; Zoccatelli concludes they are also an esoteric movement.

"Esoteric and New Age Groups" contains chapters on Scientology, Theosophy, J. Z. Knight, the Order of the Solar Temple, and the Movement of Spiritual Inner Awareness (MSIA). Scientology is examined by Dorthe Refslund Christensen, who focuses on the hagiographic biography of its founder, L. Ron Hubbard, and its role and status within the organization. James A. Santucci covers the occultist Theosophical Society, discussing its history and related organizations, of which there are many derived from it. The Order of the Solar Temple, a group notorious for the mass-murder suicides committed by its members in the 1990s, is written about by James R. Lewis, with a particular focus on its leader Joseph Di Mambro; he compares him with various other "cult leaders" and criticizes the typical millennialist lens through which it and similar events are often viewed through as simplistic. Gail M. Harley then covers J. Z. Knight, an American spiritual leader, in the context of the spiritual practice of mediumship and female spirituality; Diana G. Tumminia analyzes the beliefs and practices of the MSIA, an American group focused on the soul, through a sociological lens. "Other Groups and Movements" covers Heaven's Gate, Raëlians, "Wolf Age Pagans", and Satanism. George D. Chryssides covers Heaven's Gate, notorious for their 1997 mass suicide, while Susan J. Palmer focuses on the Raëlians and their media strategy. "Wolf Age Pagans", fringe racist pagan groups, are covered by Mattias Gardell, who focuses on their relationship with white power culture. Jesper Petersen focuses on the Satanist subculture.

=== 2nd edition (2014) ===
The introduction from the second edition is a modified and shortened version of the first edition's. "Western Religious Traditions" follows the Unification Church, the Peoples Temple, the Branch Davidians, controversial evangelical movements, Kabbalah Centre, and African-American Muslims. Chancellor's chapter on the Family International is reprinted from the first edition, while Sarah Lewis gives an overview of the Unification Church and their activities, particularly the several related organizations created by its founder. The Peoples Temple is again covered by Moore, now focusing on its controversies. The Branch Davidians have their religious roots analyzed by Eugene V. Gallagher. The spiritual Jesus People, Calvary Chapel, and Vineyard Movement evangelical movements, have their controversies covered by Jane Skjoldli. The Kabbalah Centre, which incorporates Orthodox Judaism but also includes members of other faiths, has its beliefs and history profiled by Jody Myers, including how they are run like a business. Three controversial Black American Muslim groups, the Nation of Islam, The Five Percenters, and the Moorish Science Temple, are the subject of Göran Larsson's chapter, who focuses on their history and theology in the context of North America.

"Asian and Asian-inspired Traditions" covers the MSIA, ISKCON, Transcendental Meditation, the Rajneesh movement, Aum Shinrikyo, and Falun Gong. The MSIA is this time covered by editor James R. Lewis, who discusses the accusations it has faced of plagiarizing another group, as well as its religious beliefs. ISKCON's history, as well as the problems it evidences for the study of NRMs, are written about by Malcolm Haddon. Transcendental Meditation's controversies are profiled by Inga B. Tøllefsen; the Rajneesh movement is once again covered by Marion S. Goldman, who focuses this time on how it has transformed as a movement. Martin Repp's chapter on Aum Shinrikyo is reprinted from the first edition. Helen Farley covers the narratives promoted by Falun Gong, as well as their controversies and systems of thought, practice and doctrine.

"Western Esoteric and New Age Groups" covers Scientology, the Church Universal and Triumphant (CUT), the Solar Temple, Shamanism, Modern paganism, and the New Age broadly. Scientology's development is examined by Kjersti Hellesøy, while CUT and its history, a controversial church that used to preach the end of the world, is outlined by Jocelyn H. DeHaas. The Solar Temple is then covered by Henrik Bogdan, who analyzes various hypotheses of what led to the murder-suicides of the group, as well as giving a background on their history and doctrine. New Age theology as a whole is followed by Siv Ellen Kraft, before modern paganism is discussed by Manon Hedenborgh-White, who gives an outline as to its history and practices, as well as the controversial elements of the movement. Anne Kalvig's chapter focuses on modern practice of the spiritual technique shamanism. "Other Groups and Movements" cover's Heaven's Gate, Raëlians, Wolf Age Pagans, and Satanism. George D. Chryssides' chapter on Heaven's Gate is reprinted from the first edition. Raëlians are again covered by Erik A. W. Östling, who focuses on the relationship of the religion with ancient astronaut theories. Wolf Age Pagans are again discussed by Mattias Gardell. Jesper Petersen again covers Satanism, this time focusing on especially the religious themes of modern Satanism.

== Contributors ==
=== 2004 ===
- James A. Beverly
- James D. Chancellor
- Dorthe Refslund Christensen
- George D. Chryssides
- Mattias Gardell
- Marion S. Goldman
- Gail M. Harley
- Robert Kisala
- James R. Lewis
- Rebecca Moore
- David Ownby
- Susan Palmer
- Jesper Aagaard Petersen
- Martin Repp
- E. Burke Rochford, Jr.
- James A. Santucci
- Diana G. Tumminia
- Stuart A. Wright
- PierLuigi Zoccatelli

=== 2014 ===
- Henrik Bogdan
- James D. Chancellor
- George D. Chryssides
- Jocelyn H. DeHaas
- Helen Farley
- Eugene V. Gallagher
- Mattias Gardell
- Marion S. Goldman
- Malcolm Haddon
- Manon Hedenborg-White
- Kjersti Hellesøy
- Anne Kalvig
- Siv Ellen Kraft
- Göran Larsson
- James R. Lewis
- Sarah M. Lewis
- Rebecca Moore
- Jody Myers
- Erik A. W. Östling
- Jesper Aagaard Petersen
- Martin Repp
- Jane Skjoldli
- Inga B. Tøllefsen

== Publication ==
Controversial New Religions was first published December 9, 2004 by Oxford University Press. In 2014, a second edition of the work was published from the same two editors. The second edition contains several new chapters replacing ones from the first edition, though it is not indicated in the work what differences there are from the first. According to the publisher, the second edition contains "mostly new material by different scholars". The first edition contains 19 essays, and the second contains 22.

When the first edition was published, editor James R. Lewis was a lecturer at the University of Wisconsin-Milwaukee, while co-editor Jesper Aagard Petersen was a teaching assistant at University of Copenhagen in the history of religions department. At the time of the second edition's publication Lewis was a professor of religious studies at the University of Tromsø in Norway, while Petersen was an associate professor at the Norwegian University of Science and Technology who specialized in religious studies.

== Reception ==
The volume received generally positive reviews. Karlie King praised the essays included for their thoroughness and the angles from which they explored the material, though noted most used the rhetoric of academia and so would be most suited for that audience. A review from the journal Illness, Crisis & Loss praised the book as "interesting on its own merit" and said it was "another fine example of Oxford University Press' ability to carefully research, document and incorporate vital information" into reference works. The reviewer said the book "exposed the raw nerves of what religion can and has become for many". A review in the journal Missiology said the book would serve as a resource for those looking for a less sensationalistic approach to learning about NRMs.

Some reviews described it as "typical" of the edited collections devoted to this topic. George Adams described it as uneven in places, with some individual chapters being written by people who seemed too sympathetic to the groups they were studying. He singled out Christensen's chapter on Scientology as in his view not adequately covering how the Church of Scientology had controlled the narrative, and said Harley's chapter on J. Z. Knight did not engage with basic questions of the legitimacy of the practices in question. He also noted that the more specialized chapters presumed the reader already knew of the groups, while others assumed no previous knowledge of them. In a review from Choice magazine, reviewer C. H. Lippy recommended the volume, calling it valuable to scholars for reference and analysis. He described the book as rejecting cult-type language and ideas of brainwashing, focusing instead on internal elements. King noted that at the core of all the essays in the volume were two ideas: a utopia-dystopia narrative and the connection between new religious movements and the idea of cults.

Reviewing the second edition, J. R. Stone of Choice recommended the volume for both researchers and general readers. He said its inclusion of new chapters made it an ideal companion to the first edition. Jonathan Benthall, reviewing the work for The Times Literary Supplement, described it as a "balanced and intriguing book", noting its inclusion of many scholars studying in Nordic countries. He particularly singled out Hellesøy's chapter on Scientology for praise, calling it "insightful", however said Lewis and Petersen's introduction was "all-too-brief".
