= Ontario Consultants on Religious Tolerance =

Former website dedicated to religious tolerance

Ontario Consultants on Religious Tolerance (ReligiousTolerance.org)
- Website type: Educational, religious
- Available in: English
- Owner: Ontario Consultants on Religious Tolerance
- Website: www.religioustolerance.org (no longer valid)
- Launched: 1995; 31 years ago
- Current status: Inactive (as of early 2023)

The Ontario Consultants on Religious Tolerance (OCRT) was a group in Kingston, Ontario, that was dedicated to the promotion of religious tolerance through their website, ReligiousTolerance.org, from 1995 to 2023.

== History of the group and its website ==
Bruce A. Robinson, who is described as the "chief architect" of the organization, has presented a history of the group and its website in the book Religion on the Internet: Research Prospects and Promises (edited by Jeffrey K. Hadden and Douglas E. Cowan). In 2008, the group consisted of an Agnostic, an Atheist, a Christian, a Wiccan and a Zen Buddhist.

Feeling that much of the information about religious minorities from the media was inaccurate, the group created its website in an attempt to explain the nature of these beliefs. Satanism, Wicca, other Neopagan religions and New Age were some of the first belief systems they focused on. The site has hosted over eight thousand articles devoted to the description of numerous religions and religious controversies.

The group has stated that religious tolerance does not mean having to accept that the beliefs of others are true, or will lead to the same God, but rather it means respecting others' right to choose their beliefs without being oppressed or discriminated against: "We can believe that members of another religious group are hopelessly deluded, and still support their right to enjoy religious freedom".

Having originally begun as an informal group, the Ontario Consultants on Religious Tolerance were registered as a sole proprietorship in 1996, one year after the website had first been made available online. In addition to his writings on the website, Robinson has also contributed a chapter on "Satanic Ritual Abuse" to The Encyclopedia of Cults, Sects, and New Religions (2001), edited by James R. Lewis.

== Reception ==
In Dimensions of Human Behavior, Elizabeth D. Hutchison described Ontario Consultants for Religious Tolerance as "an agency that promotes religious tolerance as a human right". In Teaching New Religious Movements (2007), David G. Bromley has listed ReligiousTolerance.org among recommended secondary research sources on new religious movements to be used in concert with movement and countermovement sources. Rebecca Moore, a scholar teaching Religious Studies at San Diego State University, described the ReligiousTolerance.org website as a "massive education program" and she expressed regret that her students dismissed the site at first because it supported itself with advertising. A 2005 online literacy guide (IssueWeb: A Guide and Sourcebook for Researching Controversial Issues on the Web) has listed ReligiousTolerance.org as a suggested research resource on abortion, assisted suicide, religious tolerance, gay rights and hate groups/hate crimes. The New York Times noted in 2002 that access to the site was blocked to Internet users in Saudi Arabia.

The website has not been online since some time in 2023 and it is not known if the organization is still active today.
