= The New Vigilantes =

Nonfiction book on the American anti-cult movement

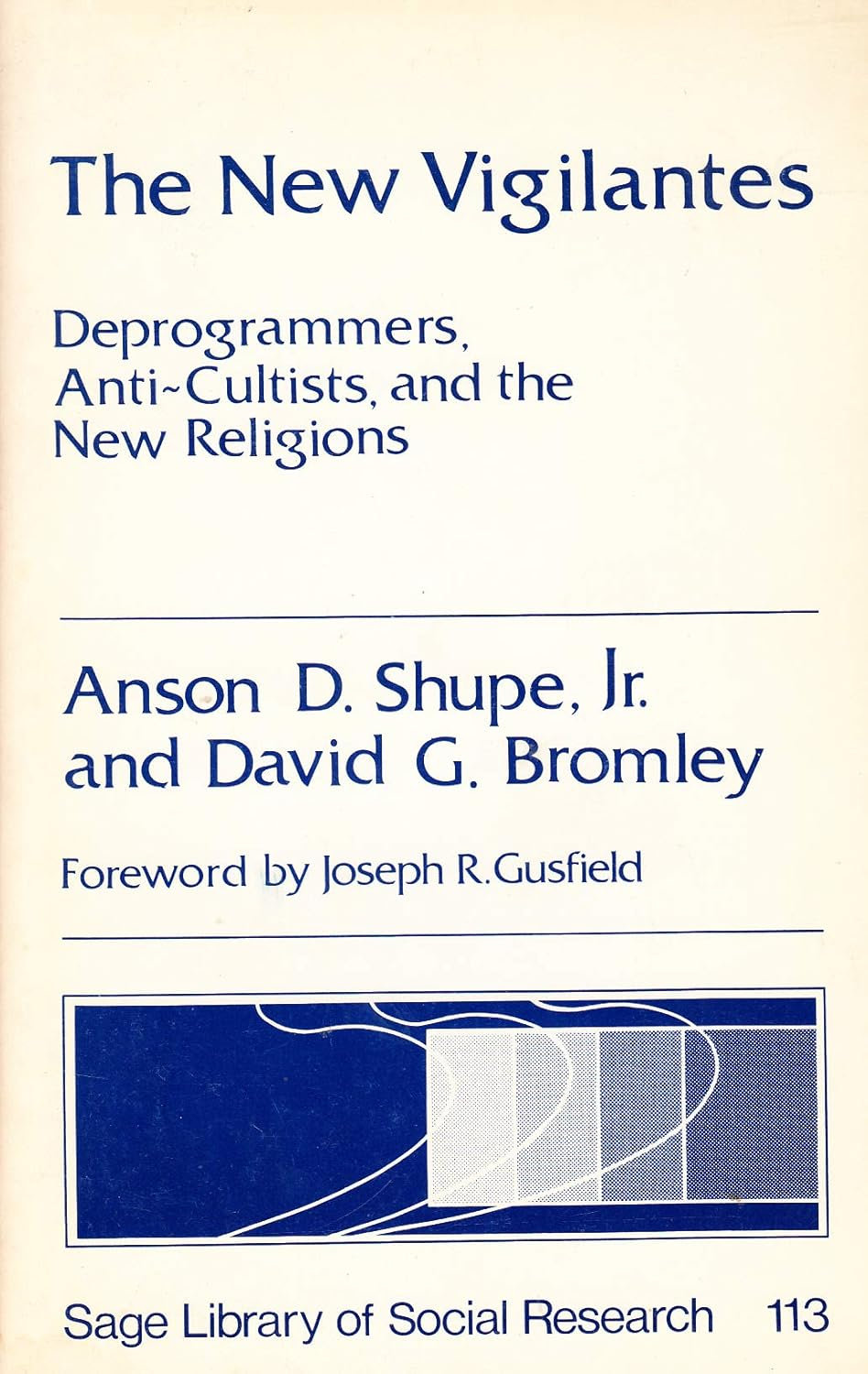
- Cover
- Authors: Anson D. Shupe, David G. Bromley
- Language: English
- Genre: nonfiction
- Publisher: SAGE Publications
- Publication date: 1980
- Pages: 267
- ISBN: 9780803915428
- OCLC: 06762468

The New Vigilantes: Deprogrammers, Anti-Cultists, and the New Religions is a 1980 nonfiction book on anti-cultism, deprogramming, and new religious movements (cults) by sociologists of religion Anson D. Shupe and David G. Bromley. A foreword was written by Joseph R. Gusfield. It was published by SAGE Publications in its Library of Social Research series as volume 113. Some have described the volume as a companion to their previous work, "Moonies" in America: Cult, Church, and Crusade (1979). Shupe and Bromley approach the anti-cult movement in the United States through a resource-mobilization lens.

== Reception ==
Some scholars believe that The New Vigilantes has great scholarly value. Roland Robertson for Contemporary Sociology wrote that "the book is, for all of its theoretical disorganization, a helpful contribution to our understanding of modern American society". Thomas Robbins for the Journal for the Scientific Study of Religion noted that the authors "exhibit a kind of detached evenhandedness" which "places the views of the concerned parents, clergy, deprogrammers, ex-devotees and clinicians... on the same ontological level as the notion of cultist zealots". Stuart A. Wright for Review of Religious Research argues that combined with "Moonies" in America the two works "provide a valuable and scholarly contribution to the dynamics between a social movement (Unification Church) and countermovement (anti-cult movement)". He adds that the book "also provides a provocative and critical analysis of 'psychological brainwashing' claims". Meredith B. McGuire for Sociological Analysis called the book a "straight-forward descriptive account of the recent anti-cult movement", and adds that the book is "readable, though somewhat repetitive and short on theoretical interpretation". Joe E. Barnhart for the Journal of Church and State calls the work a "major contribution to the study of a slice of American religious and organizational life in the 1970s".

Other scholars found Shupe and Bromley's conclusions daunting and flawed. Arthur A. Dole for Journal of Religion & Health – who noted their paternal relationship with a former Unification Church member – believed that the movement is "too complicated and the facts too sparse to justify any comprehensive universal theory about cult and anti-cult". Dole also criticizes Shupe and Bromley's apparent disregard for important elements of anti-cult behavior, like the parental instinct to protect a child, and apparent bias against the anti-cult movement; he also criticizes the lack of important works of scholarship available on the Unification Church like Irving L. Horowitz's Science, Sin, and Scholarship (1978). William Sims Bainbridge for Social Forces notes how Shupe and Bromley seemingly miss entire portions of the anti-cult movement, like the United States federal government "war with Scientology", because they are too focused on the anti-cult attack on the Unification Church. He also notes some severe methodological flaws of the work, primarily a lack of survey research conducted on the anti-cult movement. In comparing the work to Michael W. Agopian's Parental Child-Stealing (1981), Roy L. Austin for The Annals of the American Academy of Political and Social Science says that the works do not "make a worthwhile contribution to our understanding of deviance". In reviewing this work, "Moonies" in America, and Shupe and Bromley's Strange Gods (1981), Jack C. Ross for the Canadian Journal of Sociology argues that their methodology relies too heavily on trusting that the authors conducted the interviews and observed the events as they say.
