= Strange Gods: The Great American Cult Scare =

Nonfiction book about cults

- Authors: Anson D. Shupe, David G. Bromley
- Language: English
- Subject: Cults
- Publisher: Beacon Press
- Publication date: 1981
- Pages: 266
- ISBN: 0-8070-3256-5
- OCLC: 07947410
- Dewey Decimal: 291'.0973
- LC Class: BL2530.U6B76 1981

Strange Gods: The Great American Cult Scare is a 1981 nonfiction book by Anson D. Shupe and David G. Bromley about the "cult scare" in America in the 1970s. It was published by Beacon Press in Boston. Shupe and Bromley analyze six specific new religious movements (cults) – the Unification Church, the Church of Scientology, the Children of God, the Divine Light Mission, the International Society for Krishna Consciousness, and the Peoples Temple – in order to partially dispel myths about them.

== Reception ==
Mary Farrell Bednarowski for the Journal of the American Academy of Religion calls the book "particularly valuable for its insistence on the need for hard evidence regarding anti-cult claims". Lori Anderson Heflebower for Social Science Quarterly notes that "[w]hile solutions are not always offered to the multisided issues, the authors present a factual, descriptive view of the realities of the cult controversy". William L. Pitts for the Journal of Church and State acknowledges that "[m]any books on the cults are theological and polemical; this one is sociological and legal". Bill J. Leonard for Review & Expositor adds that the work is "a helpful supplement to more polemical analyses of the cults".

James A. Beckford for Sociological Analysis believes that the book has a "touch of media hype about it" and is in a lot of ways paradoxical like how it is well-written but "loosely reasoned". He believes that those familiar with the academic study of new religious movements will find little scholarly value from the work. Jack C. Ross for the Canadian Journal of Sociology also notes that anyone familiar with new religious movements can find "innumerable facts to quibble with, even if the authors' model and outline of the issues are acceptable".

Among reviewers in the popular press, Philip Zaleski of The Boston Phoenix said that the book "treats these groups with the fairness they deserve, carefully scrutinizing the history, theology, leadership, and finances of each". At the same time, the work punctures the "myths about enormous cult membership", their "far-flung financial empires", and their supposed "devious intentions".
