= The Church of Scientology (Melton book) =

2000 book by J. Gordon Melton

- Cover
- Author: J. Gordon Melton
- Language: English
- Series: Studies in Contemporary Religions
- Subject: Church of Scientology
- Publisher: Signature Books with CESNUR
- Publication date: August 2000
- Publication place: United States
- Media type: Print (Paperback)
- Pages: 80
- ISBN: 1-56085-139-2
- OCLC: 43287391
- Dewey Decimal: 299/.936 21
- LC Class: BP605.S2 M46 2000

The Church of Scientology is a 2000 book about the Church of Scientology by religious scholar J. Gordon Melton. It was published by Signature Books in collaboration with Center for Studies on New Religions (CESNUR).

== Publication history ==
The book was authored by religious scholar J. Gordon Melton, then the director of the Institute for the Study of American Religions. It was published by Signature Books in collaboration with CESNUR in 2000 as part of their Studies in Contemporary Religions series, in an 80-page edition.

== Summary ==
Melton deals with the history and development of Scientology, covering such matters as church's structure and organization, ethics, and nonprofit initiatives. He also deals with the church's views regarding religious freedom and human rights, as well as its members efforts to win their own religious freedom and human rights. He also deals with the question the Church itself has often been asked, whether it does qualify as a religion.

== Reception ==
Derek Davis said in the Journal of Church and State, "Few books pack as much information into so little space." A writer for the Library Journal called it a "brief but well-balanced guide" to the controversial movement, and a "good choice for public libraries". Publishers Weekly wrote that it was a rare, welcome impartial treatment of the subject by an outsider and that Melton had done "admirably" in covering the bases and showing the views of both the Church and its detractors.

In a review in the Marburg Journal of Religion, Marco Frenschkowski wrote that the book "err[s] on the side of too much politeness and hesitation when discussing critical questions posed by the public about Scientology", though in a separate commentary for Alternative Spirituality and Religion Review, called it a "quite useful booklet" with a "fine balance" despite these flaws.
