= J. Gordon Melton =

American religious scholar (born 1942)

The Reverend J. Gordon Melton
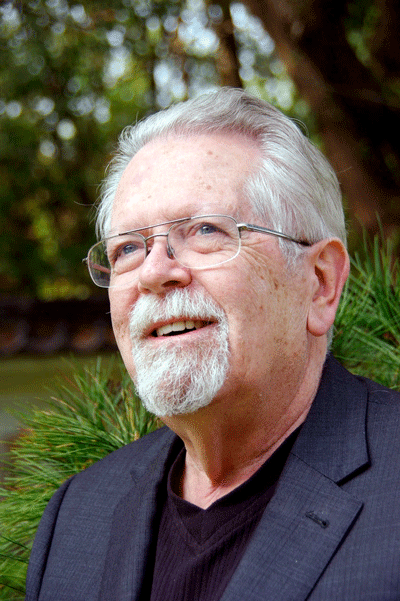
- Born: John Gordon Melton; September 19, 1942 (age 84); Birmingham, Alabama, U.S.

Academic background
- Education: Birmingham–Southern College; Garrett-Evangelical Theological Seminary
- Alma mater: Northwestern University
- Thesis: The Shape and Structure of the American Religious Experience: A Definition and Classification of Primary Religious Bodies in the United States (1975)

Academic work
- Discipline: Methodist, Religion, New religious movements, American religious history
- Institutions: Baylor University
- Notable works: Encyclopedia of American Religions

John Gordon Melton (born September 19, 1942) is an American religious scholar who was the founding director of the Institute for the Study of American Religion and was the Distinguished Professor of American Religious History with the Institute for Studies of Religion at Baylor University in Waco, Texas where he resides. He is also an ordained minister in the United Methodist Church.

Melton is the author of more than forty-five books, including several encyclopedias, handbooks, and scholarly textbooks on American religious history, Methodism, world religions, and new religious movements (NRMs). His areas of research include major religious traditions, American Methodism, new and alternative religions, Western Esotericism and occultism, and parapsychology, New Age, and Dracula and vampire studies.

== Early life and education ==
Melton was born in Birmingham, Alabama, the son of Burnum Edgar Melton and Inez Parker. During his senior year in high school, he came across The Small Sects in America by Elmer T. Clark; he became interested in reading as much as possible on alternative religions.

In 1964, he graduated from Birmingham–Southern College with an A.B. degree in geology. After completing his undergraduate education he matriculated into Garrett-Evangelical Theological Seminary to study theology and ancient church history, graduating first in his class with a Master of Divinity in 1968. He completed doctoral studies at Northwestern University with a Ph.D. in He married Dorothea Dudley in 1966, who had one daughter, Melanie. The marriage ended in divorce in 1979. His second wife is named Suzie.

== Career ==
As of 2017 Melton was the incumbent Distinguished Professor of American Religious History with the Institute for Studies of Religion at Baylor University in Waco, Texas where he resides. He had retired as professor by 2023.

Melton has authored several encyclopedic works on American religion. He authored the Encyclopedia of American Religions, first published by Gale in 1979, which he revised in several editions every few years. The book was a success. He also edited the later editions of the Encyclopedia of Occultism & Parapsychology. In his Encyclopedic Handbook of Cults in America, Melton distinguished the Christian countercult and the secular anti-cult movements. He articulated the distinction on the grounds that the two movements operate with very different epistemologies motives and methods. This distinction has been subsequently acknowledged by sociologists such as Douglas E. Cowan and Eileen Barker. As of 2006, he had edited 17 and written 30 books.

In addition to religious studies, Melton has an interest in vampires, on which he has written several books. In 1997, Melton, Massimo Introvigne, and Elizabeth Miller organized an event at the Westin Hotel in Los Angeles where 1,500 attendees (some dressed as vampires) came for a "creative writing contest, Gothic rock music and theatrical performances." When Sony was accused of copyright infringement over a story involving vampires and werewolves in 2003, the company contacted Melton, who testified that stories about conflicts between the two sets of creatures had been present since the 1950s. The case was settled.

== Aum Shinrikyo investigation ==
In May 1995, during the investigation into the Tokyo subway sarin attack, the group responsible for the attack, Aum Shinrikyo, contacted an American group known as AWARE (Association of World Academics for Religious Education), founded by American scholar James R. Lewis, claiming that the human rights of its members were being violated. Lewis recruited Melton, human rights lawyer Barry Fisher, and chemical expert Thomas Banigan. They flew to Japan, with their travel expenses paid by Aum, and announced that they would investigate and report through press conferences at the end of their trip.

In the press conferences, Fisher and Lewis announced that Aum could not have produced the sarin with which the attacks had been committed. They had determined this with their technical expert, Lewis said, based on photos and documents provided by the group. British scholar of Japanese religions Ian Reader, in a detailed account of the incident, reported that Melton "had few doubts by the end of his visit to Japan of Aum's complicity" and eventually "concluded that Aum had in fact been involved in the attack and other crimes"; The Washington Post account of the final press conference mentioned Lewis and Fisher but not Melton.

Reader concluded, "The visit was well-intentioned, and the participants were genuinely concerned about possible violations of civil rights in the wake of the extensive police investigations and detentions of followers." However, it was ill-fated and detrimental to the reputation of those involved. While distinguishing between Lewis' and Melton's attitudes, Reader observed that both Japanese media and some fellow scholars also criticized Melton. Using stronger words, Canadian scholar Stephen A. Kent chastised both Lewis and Melton for having put the reputation of the whole category of scholars of new religious movements at risk.

== Reception ==
The Los Angeles Times described Melton as "one of the nation's foremost authorities on religion (and vampires [...])". Melton's scholarly works concentrate on the phenomenology and not the theology of NRMs. Some Christian countercultists criticize Melton for not critiquing the groups he reports on from an evangelical perspective, arguing that his failure to do so is incompatible with his statements of professed evangelicalism. Some secular anti-cultists who feel that new religious movements are dangerous and that scholars should actively work against them have likewise criticized him. Stephen A. Kent and Theresa Krebs, for example, characterized Gordon Melton, James R. Lewis, and Anson D. Shupe as biased towards the groups they study.

Similarly, Perry Bulwer, B.A, LLB. has called Melton's research into The Family International "unreliable" and alleges bias and support for the NRM.

== Publications ==
- —— (1974). Log Cabins to Steeples: The United Methodist Way in Illinois. Chicago: Commissions on Archives and History, Northern, Central, and Southern Illinois Conferences.
- ——; Geisendorfer, James V. (1977). A Directory of Religious Bodies in the United States. New York: Garland Publishing. ISBN 0-8240-9882-X.
- ——, ed. (1978). Encyclopedia of American Religions. Wilmington: McGrath Publishing.
  - ——, ed. (2009). Melton's Encyclopedia of American Religions (8th ed.). Detroit: Gale Cengage Learning. ISBN 978-0-787-69696-2.
- —— (1982). Magic, Witchcraft, and Paganism in America: A Bibliography. New York: Garland Publishing. ISBN 0-8240-9377-1.
  - ——; Poggi, Isotta (1992). Magic, Witchcraft, and Paganism in America: A Bibliography (2nd ed.). New York: Garland Publishing. ISBN 0-8153-0499-4.
- ——; Pruter, Karl (1983). The Old Catholic Sourcebook. New York: Garland Publishing. ISBN 0-8240-9111-6.
- —— (1985). An Open Letter Concerning the Local Church, Witness Lee and The God-Men Controversy. Santa Barbara: Institute for the Study of American Religion.
- ——; Moore, Robert L. (1985). The Cult Experience: Responding to the New Religious Pluralism. New York: Pilgrim Press. ISBN 0-8298-0619-9.
- Enroth, Ronald M.; —— (1985). Why Cults Succeed Where The Church Fails. Elgin: Brethren Press. ISBN 0-87178-931-0.
- —— (1986). The Encyclopedic Handbook of Cults in America. New York: Garland Publishing. ISBN 0-8240-9036-5.
  - —— (1992). Encyclopedic Handbook of Cults in America (Revised and updated ed.). New York: Garland Publishing. ISBN 0-8153-0502-8.
- —— (1986). Biographical Dictionary of American Cult and Sect Leaders. New York: Garland Publishing. ISBN 0-8240-9037-3.
  - —— (1999). Religious Leaders of America: A Biographical Guide to Founders and Leaders of Religious Bodies, Churches, and Spiritual Groups in North America (2nd ed.). Detroit: Gale Research. ISBN 0-8103-8878-2.
- —— (1988). The Encyclopedia of American Religions: Religious Creeds. Detroit: Gale Research. ISBN 0-8103-2132-7.
- —— (1988). Finding Enlightenment: Ramtha's School of Ancient Wisdom. Hillsboro: Beyond Words Publishing. ISBN 1-885223-61-7.
  - —— (1991). American Religious Creeds. New York: Triumph Books. ISBN 0-8007-3014-3.
- ——; Clark, Jerome; Kelly, Aidan A. (1991). New Age Almanac. Detroit: Visible Ink Press. ISBN 0-8103-9402-2.
- —— (1992). Religious Bodies in the U.S.: A Dictionary. New York: Garland Publishing. ISBN 0-8153-0806-X.
- Lewis, James R.; ——, eds. (1992). Perspectives on the New Age. Albany: State University of New York Press. ISBN 0-7914-1213-X.
- Köszegi, Michael A.; ——, eds. (1992). Islam in North America: A Sourcebook. New York: Garland Publishing. ISBN 0-8153-0918-X.
- Murphy, Larry G.; ——; Ward, Gary L., eds. (1993). Encyclopedia of African American Religions. New York: Garland Publishing. ISBN 0-8153-0500-1.
  - Murphy, Larry G.; ——; Ward, Gary L., eds. (2011). Encyclopedia of African American Religions. New York: Routledge. ISBN 978-0-8153-0500-2.
- Lewis, James R.; ——, eds. (1994). Church Universal and Triumphant: In Scholarly Perspective. Stanford: Center for Academic Publication.
- Lewis, James R.; ——, eds. (1994). Sex, Slander, and Salvation: Investigating The Family/Children of God. Stanford: Center for Academic Publication. ISBN 0-9639501-2-6.
- —— (1994). The Vampire Book: The Encyclopedia of the Undead. Detroit: Gale Research. ISBN 0-8103-9553-3.
- ——; Lucas, Phillip Charles; Stone, Jon R. (1997). Prime-Time Religion: An Encyclopedia of Religious Broadcasting. Phoenix: Oryx Press. ISBN 0-89774-902-2.
- —— (2000). American Religions: An Illustrated History. Santa Barbara: ABC-Clio. ISBN 1-57607-222-3.
- —— (2000). The Church of Scientology. Salt Lake City: Signature Books. ISBN 1-56085-139-2.
- ——, ed. (1996). Encyclopedia of Occultism & Parapsychology (4th ed.). Detroit: Gale Group. ISBN 0-8103-5487-X.
  - ——, ed. (2001). Encyclopedia of Occultism & Parapsychology (5th ed.). Detroit: Gale Group. ISBN 0-8103-9488-X.
- Bromley, David G.; ——, eds. (2002). Cults, Religion, and Violence. Cambridge University Press. ISBN 0-521-66064-5.
- ——; Baumann, Martin, eds. (2002). Religions of the World: A Comprehensive Encyclopedia of Beliefs and Practices. Santa Barbara: ABC-Clio. ISBN 1-57607-223-1.
  - ——; Baumann, Martin, eds. (2010). Religions of the World: A Comprehensive Encyclopedia of Beliefs and Practices (2nd ed.). Santa Barbara: ABC-Clio. ISBN 978-1-59884-203-6.
- —— (2003). Protestant Faith in America. New York: Chelsea House. ISBN 1-281-30588-X.
  - —— (2012). Protestant Faith in America (2nd ed.). New York: Facts On File. ISBN 978-1-4381-4039-1.
- ——, ed. (2005). Encyclopedia of Protestantism. New York: Facts On File. ISBN 0-8160-5456-8.
- —— (2007). A Will to Choose: The Origins of African American Methodism. Lanham: Rowman & Littlefield. ISBN 978-0-7425-5264-7.
- —— (2022). The Vampire Almanac: The Complete History. Detroit: Visible Ink Press. ISBN 978-1-57859-719-2.

== See also ==
- List of new religious movement and cult researchers
- Sociological classifications of religious movements
