= The Order of the Solar Temple: The Temple of Death =

2006 book by James R. Lewis

- Cover of the first edition
- Editor: James R. Lewis
- Language: English
- Series: Controversial New Religions
- Subject: Order of the Solar Temple
- Publisher: Ashgate Publishing
- Publication date: 2006
- Publication place: United Kingdom
- Media type: Print
- Pages: 234
- ISBN: 0-7546-5285-8
- OCLC: 62322223
- Dewey Decimal: 299.9
- LC Class: BP605.O77 O73 2006

The Order of the Solar Temple: The Temple of Death is an edited volume about the Order of the Solar Temple (OTS), a religious group notorious for the mass deaths of its members in several mass murders and suicides throughout the 1990s. It was edited by James R. Lewis, and published in 2006 by Ashgate Publishing as part of its Controversial New Religions series. Contributors to the book include Jean-François Mayer, Massimo Introvigne, Susan J. Palmer, and George D. Chryssides.

The book includes ten articles, some new to this volume and some republished, covering many different aspects of the group, including its beliefs, leadership, and origins. It received a generally positive critical reception, with praise for its neutrality and the amount of information it provided, though some reviewers criticized the lack of coverage of some aspects of the group, as well as its layout and clarity.

== Background ==
The Order of the Solar Temple was a new religious movement (NRM) started in 1984, led by Joseph Di Mambro and Luc Jouret. It incorporated a variety of beliefs, but claimed descent from the Knights Templar. Jouret, a popular homeopath and lecturer, was the "Grand Master" of the group, while Di Mambro held more true power within the group but was more private. The group had 442 members as of 1989. Although initially optimistic, in the early 1990s it became increasingly focused on the end of the world, and the organization began facing internal and external problems. Following this, the group's leaders developed a concept of death as "transit" to the star Sirius, and in October 1994, 53 bodies were found on several sites in Switzerland and Quebec. Some were found to have been murdered as "traitors" to the movement, while others were drugged and shot by the most devoted members to help them "transit"; these members then killed themselves.

This did not end the deaths, as the following year 16 more people were found dead in France, followed by another five in March 1997 in Quebec. The group left behind many writings explaining their rationale for the deaths, though it was known to be highly secretive, with little known about the group even internally beyond its highest-ranking members, with the organization using multiple names and operating via various "shell" groups. In the aftermath of the deaths, there was criticism of the police investigation, and various conspiracy theories. There was little scholarly work on the movement in the aftermath.

== Publication ==
The Order of the Solar Temple: The Temple of Death was published in 2006 by Ashgate. It is part of Ashgate's Controversial New Religions series. According to the book's publisher, it is the first book-length work on the OTS in English, and according to Hendrik Bogdan it was, as of 2011, still the only English-language academic book on the group. It was edited by James R. Lewis, then a lecturer in religious studies at the University of Wisconsin–Milwaukee, author of many other books on new religious movements.

== Contents ==
The contributors to the book are, in order of their chapters: Jean-François Mayer, Massimo Introvigne, Susan J. Palmer, John R. Hall, Philip Schuyler, John Walliss, George D. Chryssides, Henrik Bogdan, Marc Labelle, and Roland J. Campiche. The book has ten articles arranged in order of first publication; some were original to this volume, while others had been previously published elsewhere. Some articles that were previously unavailable in English were translated for this book. It contains an introduction by Lewis, and appendices of several texts written by the group itself. The book's chapters explore different aspects of the group, including its social dynamics, beliefs, leadership, and background in thought and doctrine. It also explores various hypotheses on what led to the deaths in the group and how the group should be classified, as it drew aspects from a variety of esoteric, New Age, and religious movements.

One article, Mayer's "Templars for the Age of Aquarius", was first published in French a year before the first deaths related to the group had occurred. At that time, it was the only complete academic work on the group available. This article, which Mayer later noted in the chapter's foreword as "unknowingly premonitory", asserts that the group would one day "draw a great deal more attention to itself". This chapter by Mayer traces the start of the group and the variety of names and organizations it previously used and evolved from.

Introvigne's chapter explores the history of neo-Templarism, as well as the various criminal activities of the group. Introvigne, in addition to other writers in the book, argue that the OTS took much of its ideology from French writer Jacques Breyer, pointing out the personal connection between him and the two leaders. Palmer's chapter views the group through the lens of anthropologist Mary Douglas's work on ritualistic elements of pollution and purity, while Hall and Schuyler recount the background of the group and the events relating to the deaths. Mayer's second chapter then focuses on apocalyptic thought generally, as does Walliss's. Chryssides's chapter analyzes the doctrine of the group, while Bogdan's explores the ceremonial and ritual aspects. Labelle analyzes the group through the lens of several theorists, including Sigmund Freud and Mircea Eliade. In the final chapter, Campiche analyzes the response by the Francophone media to the case.

== Reception ==
"This book is useful not only for giving the reader a multi-faceted view of this ‘enigma', but it provides any researcher reading it with an extremely useful typology of neo-Templarism as a movement. It not only explains the possible reasons for the turn towards death on behalf of the leaders of the OST, but it illuminates the past and present of a wider movement of which we have certainly not heard the end."

— Sean O'Callaghan, Alternative Spirituality and Religion Review

The book received a generally positive reception. Historian Holly Folk, writing for the journal Communal Societies, described it as "an important research tool" and "a welcome addition" to the study of NRMs. The book was praised by sociologist of religion Régis Dericquebourg as bringing together many different points of view and a large amount of information usefully, while religious scholar Sean O'Callaghan, writing for Alternative Spirituality and Religion Review, described the book as "absolutely invaluable". Historian of religion Carole M. Cusack praised the book for its neutrality in a controversial field of study, calling it "critical and cautious", though she did believe that it was "very likely" that anti-cult activists would criticize it for lacking a complete condemnation of the OTS. She further described it as useful to both scholars of cults and the public.

Folk noted that much of the background information provided on Rosicrucianism and esotericism was not strictly necessary to understand the group, but said that it "offer[ed] a window into an enigmatic set of spiritual endeavors that [...] command the attention of a startling number of people in many countries". O'Callaghan singled out Mayer's chapter as the most interesting perspective in the book, which he said demonstrated the importance of study of NRMs generally. He additionally praised Introvigne's chapter as a "masterly" and "extremely useful" overview of neo-Templarism and the OTS within that context, saying the chapter explained an "enormously complicated" history clearly.

The book's lack of coverage of some topics was criticized; Folk argued that several topics were unaddressed, including the group's dynamics at their Sainte-Anne-de-la-Pérade location, their negative interactions with a native tribe of Mohawk people in Quebec, and the white supremacist views of the group. She also said that the relationship between the two leaders of the group was not clearly illustrated, especially later on, and that the role of Michel Tabachnik within the group was left unclear, calling these issues "deeply frustrating" and saying they hindered the book's general accessibility. Dericquebourg wished that the book had included a chapter covering the various conspiracy theories and unofficial investigations, some of which involved the idea of external involvement or cover-ups in the group's affairs. Folk criticized the book for its chronological layout, resulting in discrepancies between accounts that were not addressed, as some of the chapters were written before many events in the Order's history had occurred.
