= Sacred Suicide =

2014 book by James R. Lewis and Carole M. Cusack

- Cover of the first edition
- Editor: James R. Lewis; Carole M. Cusack
- Language: English
- Series: Ashgate New Religions
- Subject: Suicide in religion
- Publisher: Ashgate Publishing
- Publication date: 2014
- Publication place: United Kingdom
- Pages: 299
- ISBN: 978-1-4094-5086-3
- OCLC: 884298298
- Dewey Decimal: 202.3
- LC Class: BL504 .S225 2014

Sacred Suicide is a 2014 edited volume about suicide and religion, particularly as it relates to cults or new religious movements. It was published by Ashgate and edited by James R. Lewis and Carole M. Cusack, part of the Ashgate New Religions series. Other contributors to the book include Nachman Ben-Yehuda, Mattias Gardell, and Thomas Robbins. It is divided into five sections.

The book covers various aspects of suicide as they relate to religion, including high profile "suicide cults" like Heaven's Gate, the Solar Temple, and the Peoples Temple, as well as historical mass suicides like that of the siege of Masada and the Old Believers. It also covers groups that have faced more dubious allegations of being suicide cults, such as the Branch Davidians and the Falun Gong. Further topics discussed include religious terrorism, and the depiction of suicide and religion in the media.

It received a largely positive reception, with praise for the content of many of its essays; the chapter on the Peoples Temple and its coverage of the contemporary movements was singled out for praise. It was highly recommended by several reviewers, though others criticized it for not providing a proper analytical structure in the volume as a whole. The appropriateness of the cover, which depicts a person self-immolating, was also criticized by one reviewer.

== Background and publication history ==
James R. Lewis (of the University of Tromsø) was an academic focusing on new religious movements; he had previously edited several other anthologies on the topic of violence and NRMs. Carole M. Cusack was a professor of Religious Studies at the University of Sydney, and the author of several books on religion. The book includes contributors from several continents and countries.

The book was published in 2014 by Ashgate as part of its Ashgate New Religions series. Some of the chapters had been previously published elsewhere before being collected in this volume.

== Contents ==
The contributors to the book are, alongside the two editors, Nachman Ben-Yehuda, Thomas Robbins, Henrik Bogdan, Rebecca Moore, John Walliss, Jan A. Ali, Mattias Gardell, Katarina Plank, Lorenz Graitl, Helen Farley, Lynn S. Neal, and Christopher Hartney. In the book's introduction, Lewis and Cusack discuss the view of religiously or politically motivated suicide by society, contrasting the perception of Muslim suicide bombers, self-sacrifice in wartime, and the mass suicides of several NRMs. They argue that the factors driving many groups to suicide are too disparate to have a unifying cause, noting that though the mass suicide NRMs had some similarities they lacked this with suicide bombers and other religious suicides; the editors instead argue a commonality between all these cases is the stereotypical idea of religion as an "irrational force" that drives its adherents to commit suicide, an idea they criticize. A summary of each of the chapters follows this.

"Historical Suicide Cults" discusses two historic cases of mass suicide: the siege of Masada and the Old Believers. In 73 AD, 967 Jewish Sicarii, besieged by the Romans, committed mass suicide upon their realization they could not escape. Ben-Yahuda discusses the siege and its historicity, arguing that by the 1960s it had become a founding myth of Israel. Robbins covers the Old Believers, a group of Russian schismatic Christians, tens of thousands whom committed suicide through self-immolation over a decades long period from the late 1700s on. He compares it to Jonestown, though argues that unlike Jonestown only a minority of Old Believers partook in mass suicide and that unlike the Old Believers, much of the persecution the Peoples Temple supposedly faced was fantasy.

The second section, "Contemporary Suicide Cults", discusses more modern "suicide cults": the Order of the Solar Temple, Peoples Temple, Heaven's Gate, and the Movement for the Restoration of the Ten Commandments of God, four NRMs that made headlines for high-profile mass suicides. Henrik Bogdan first discusses the Solar Temple, a cult notorious for several group suicides and murders in the 1990s; Bogdan analyzes the various hypotheses for why the group turned violent, among them the ideas of internal stressors, perceived outside threats, and "catastrophic millennialism". Moore – related to two people who died in the massacre – then covers the deaths of 918 individuals on the Peoples Temple Jonestown commune in 1978, noting the revolutionary beliefs of many of its members, and how this ideology lead to self-inflicted violence. Cusack's chapter is on Heaven's Gate, giving a background to UFO religions historically and the social circumstances under which they emerged, and how these earlier movements are related to Heaven's Gate theology. The comparatively more obscure MRTCG is covered by Walliss; nearly a thousand members of the group died in what was initially believed to be a mass suicide, but what later investigations described as mass murder as well as mass suicide. Wallis notes the confused evidence of many aspects of the case, and how basic details are to this day uncertain, though of the many competing theories largely concurs with Richard Vokes's analysis of the group.

The third part discusses "Social-Political Suicides" of various groups, including Muslim suicide terrorists, suicide attacks as a political strategy, self-immolation in Tibetan Buddhism, and the usage of it as a media weapon by those who commit it. Ali explores Islamist terrorism as a sociological phenomenon, noting Muslim terrorist's connections to their broader social groups and their status as a form of resistance. Gardell follows this with an analysis of martyrdom and suicide attacks, and how attitudes to the concept vary between societies. He argues that it has been used by many societies, particularly focusing on Palestinian attackers. The self-immolation of Tibetan Buddhists – related to the annexation of Tibet by China – is then discussed by Katarina Plank, who traces the history of Buddhist thought that lead to the practice. She argues that a divide between Abrahamic and Indic religions leads to self-immolation being more common in Indic religions, and that method of suicide carries an additional religious aspect as a sacrifice to a larger cause. Graitl discusses the orchestrated media aspect of many of these suicides, and how it is used to communicate their ideas. He argues that to understand suicide attacks the social sciences must pay attention to the actual messages.

"Faux Suicide Cults", the fourth section, covers Falun Gong and the Branch Davidians, two groups that were accused of committing group suicide, but the truth of this is contested in both cases. Five members of Falun Gong self-immolated in Tiananmen Square in 2001, of which two died; in the aftermath, group spokespeople defended the organization, saying they were against suicide, but Chinese media organizations criticized the group's teachings as responsible for these and over a thousand other deaths. Farley argues that though the organization explicitly condemns suicide, the group's rhetoric lead to such acts, and that their teachings on medicine lead to what was effectively suicide of many members due to a refusal to consent to medical treatment. This is followed by Lewis's account of the Waco siege and the Branch Davidians. He argues that the Branch Davidians were not ideologically inclined towards suicide, and that instead the ATF's actions and the perception that they were a "suicide cult" resulted in the botched siege and deaths. The fifth section, "Screen Suicide Cults", discusses the perception of religious suicide in the media. Lynn S. Neal discusses America television's portrayal of cults and suicide; analyzing episodes of several TV shows, she argues that the episodes, by blending elements of many groups, create a cultural memory of cults, and that they present an idealized history where both the government and supposedly real religious groups acted ideally. In the final chapter, Hartney writes of Hollywood's portrayal of Muslims in film, arguing that the portrayals are orientalist in nature and that they are racist depictions.

== Reception ==
Sacred Suicide was received generally positively by reviewers. A review in Choice recommended it, describing it as of particular interest to sociologists and psychologists studying religion. They said its essays "enhance understanding" of the connection between religion and violence, and praised the bibliography sections included in each chapter. Sarah K. Pinnock highly recommended it, praising its format as convenient for research purposes as the chapters stand alone, and for its accessibility. Benjamin E. Zeller, an academic studying Heaven's Gate, called the book "very refreshing" in his review in the Journal of Religious History, as well as a "major contribution to the field".

In a review in the Journal of Religion and Violence, John Soboslai gave a more mixed opinion. He said overall the book contained "much of interest" to scholars studying the specific cases covered in the book, but that it varied in quality and contained missed opportunities; he said it was not worth the high price it was sold for by its publisher, but that it would be useful to those who borrowed it. Nova Religio's Ian Reader criticized the book, saying that while some chapters provided interesting analysis, the volume as a whole did not provide a "coherent framework or analysis" to analyze the topic, and that the book as a whole was "highly problematic" and disappointing. Zeller described the chapters as disconnected from each other, but argued this was inherent in an anthology volume. While praising the individual essays, Soboslai criticized the lack of a "systematic examination" of the broader concepts utilized in the book, and said that readers looking for a synthesis of the individual conclusions in the chapters in the book would be disappointed.

Reader said the book's introduction sidestepped this issue by merely saying that the incidents studied in the book were too disparate to discuss under one analytical scheme, and that the authors had taken an easier route in simply bringing together the essays but that the book's coherence suffered as a result. He also said the categories the book's contents were divided into and its key concepts were not clearly defined; he particularly described the contents of the fourth section as "dubious" in light of this. He did praise the contents of some specific chapters, complimenting Moore, Hartney, and Walliss's chapters, though he criticized Lewis's discussion of Waco for, in his view, using selective evidence and being written in a "tabloid media" style. Soboslai praised Cusack's analysis of Heaven's Gate as fascinating. Zeller praised the book's inclusion of other cases than the typical cult mass suicide affairs like Heaven's Gate or the Peoples Temple, saying its discussion of jihadism and Buddhist self-immolation provided a reminder that religious suicide was not limited to new religions.

Pinnock argued the volume was strongest in its dealing with contemporary movements, and complimented its structure in opening with historical cases and ending with discussions of modern media portrayals. Bernard Doherty criticized the choice of cover (depicting a person who had set themself on fire), arguing that there was likely art relating to suicide that would be more appropriate and "far less visceral" than a picture of self-immolation, but praised the work overall. He said it offered a "smorgasbord of perspectives on a complex and controversial topic" and that any future works on the topic should refer to it. He singled out Moore's chapter in particular for praise, describing it as a "fascinating look" at the rhetoric of the Peoples Temple, and described the content of the other summaries in the second section generally as "excellent".
