= Encyclopedia of American Religions =

Book by J. Gordon Melton

- Cover of the first volume of the first edition
- Editor: J. Gordon Melton
- Language: English
- Subject: Religion in the United States
- Publisher: McGrath Publishing (1st edition); Gale (later editions)
- Publication date: 1978
- Publication place: United States
- Media type: Print (hardcover)
- Pages: 1203
- OCLC: 870693295
- Dewey Decimal: 200.973
- LC Class: BL2525 .M449 1978

The Encyclopedia of American Religions, renamed Melton's Encyclopedia of American Religions in the eighth edition, is a reference book edited by J. Gordon Melton (editor-in-chief). It was first published in 1978 by McGrath Publishing. Later editions were published by Gale. It is currently in its ninth edition and has become a standard reference work in the study of religion in the United States.

== Background ==
J. Gordon Melton received his doctorate in 1975 and was, at the time of the first edition's publication, a pastor for a Methodist congregation. In 1969, he founded the Institute for the Study of American Religions, and established a large collection of materials related to religious studies; in researching religions, he subscribed to a wide range of periodicals from religious groups and had a number of informants.

== Publication history ==
The first edition of the book was published in 1978 by McGrath Publishing Company, in Wilmington, North Carolina. it was published in two volumes with 608 and 595 pages, respectively, 1203 pages in total. The first edition was entirely compiled by Melton.

The second edition was published in 1986, now in a single volume with 899 pages. This edition was published by Gale in Detroit. Its second edition received a 156 page supplement with more groups covered that were not in the main edition, published by Gale in 1987; this one included some Canadian groups and new categories. The third edition was published in 1989, again by Gale, in a 1 volume, 1102 page edition.

Its eighth edition was published in 2009 in a single-volume, 1386 page edition. This edition was renamed Melton's Encyclopedia of American Religions. The eighth edition contained contributions from others besides Melton. Its ninth edition was published in 2017.

== Contents ==
The encyclopedia has both essays on the development of religion with individual entries on specific religious organizations. Melton aimed to be inclusive in his coverage of organizations. Its first edition included about 1200 groups, the second had 1350, the third edition had 1588 groups, and the eighth had 2,300. Entries include details on history, beliefs, and activities, as well as an address. Some entries included periodicals published by the groups.

It was largely focused on the United States, though starting with the third edition the encyclopedia also covered Canada. Entries in the encyclopedia are divided into a number of different categories, called "families". Essays are also included on the categories. In the first edition, there were 17 families: Liturgical, Lutheran, Reformed-Presbyterian, Liberal, Pietist-Methodist, Holiness, Pentecostal, European Free-Church, Baptist, Independent Fundamentalist, Adventist, Latter Day Saints, Metaphysical, Psychic and New Age, Magick, and Eastern and Middle Eastern. There is an additional chapter on "New Unaffiliated Religious Bodies". Instead, the third edition added two sections, "Unclassified Christian Churches" and "Unclassified Religious Groups". It includes several topical indexes.

The third edition contained two new introductory essays. The eighth edition included entry revising, more visual aids such as maps; defunct groups were moved to an appendix.

== Reception ==
By 1989, the book had become the "standard reference work" on the subject. Reviewing its first edition, Robert S. Ellwood praised it, describing it as an "enormous contribution" and an important contribution to religious taxonomy, and writing that "no other work in print has collected as many American religious groups". Rodney Stark gave a positive review of the 1978 edition, writing that "the simple fact is this: J. Gordon Melton has made an extraordinarily valuable contribution to all scholars of religion", and that it was "an invaluable resource, particularly for its attention to sociological, as opposed to theological, detail [...] there is no competing source worthy of mention."

Reviews especially praised the information on the more obscure groups, and the amount of detail it provided. Stark said it was especially valuable due to the inclusion of material on a wide range of smaller groups, particularly cults. Ellwood found the classification in the first edition to be workable but imperfect, particularly in its placement of the Jewish faith in the "Eastern and Middle Eastern" category; he praised its categorization of the "Magick" category as an "important breakthrough".

Reviewing the third edition, Charles H. Lippy and Peter W. Williams said that it "stands alone as a monument to the task of covering the array of American religious groups exhaustively and comprehensively [...] [it] is unique and invaluable; it simply has no rivals in its exhaustiveness". David G. Bromley commented on the eighth edition in 2011, writing that it "offers the most complete and detailed representation of the diversity of religious groups in North America", having become more comprehensive over time.
