= Simone Marshall =

New Zealand scholar of medieval English literature

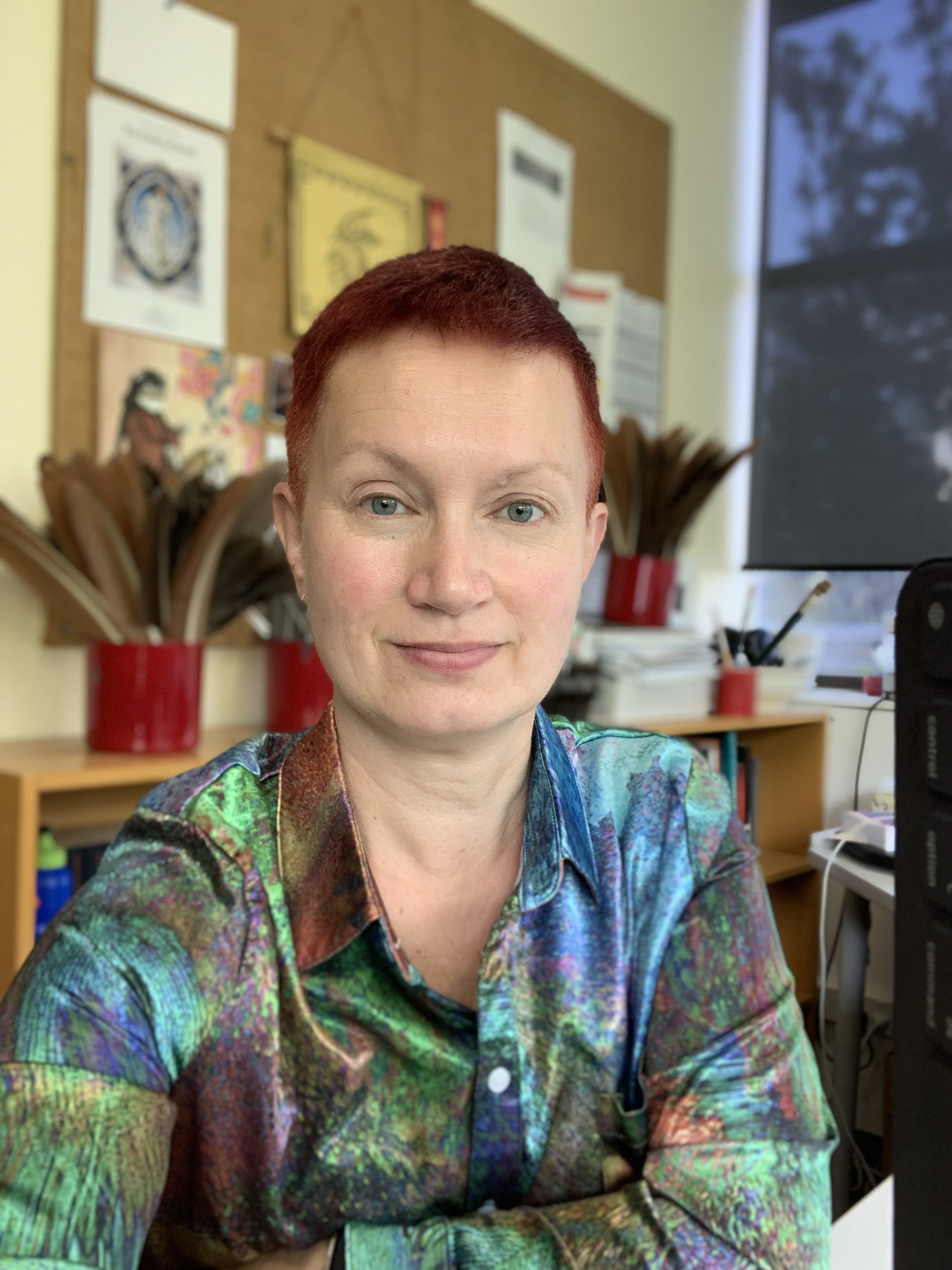
- Awards: Early Career Award for Distinction in Research

Academic background
- Education: Victoria University of Wellington, University of Waikato, University of Sydney
- Thesis: The female voice in the Assembly of ladies : a 'volume without contours' (2004)
- Website: simonecelinemarshall.com

Simone Celine Marshall is a New Zealand academic, and is a full professor at the University of Otago, specialising in 15th century literature, in particular the afterlives of Chaucer's poems.

== Academic career ==
Marshall has a Bachelor of Arts from Victoria University of Wellington, a BA with Honours and a Masters with Honours from the University of Waikato. She completed a PhD titled The female voice in the Assembly of ladies: a 'volume without contours' at the University of Sydney. Marshall then joined the faculty of the University of Otago, rising to associate professor in 2018 and full professor in 2022.

Marshall identified a previously unknown edition of Chaucer's works from 1807, and was invited to write a biography of Chaucer by Wiley/Blackwell. This discovery shows that Chaucer's life has been used to "uphold conservative white attitudes".

Marshall has received two Marsden grants. In 2009, the grant "A new paradigm of medieval literary anonymity" explored how she found that anonymity in medieval literature was a literary convention used by marginalised people, including women, to express dissent, rather than a reflection of a lack of authorial individualism. Marshall was an associate investigator on a 2011 Marsden grant "The machinery of transcendence: unattended moments in the Modernist tradition", which was led by Professor Chris Ackerley. This grant explored the relationship between medieval traditions and Modernist aesthetics.

In 2023, inspired by medieval works such as the Book of Kells and the Lindisfarne Gospels that reflect where they are from, Marshall initiated a collaborative project with Otago Art Society to create a "Book of Otago". Community groups, schools, artists and writers were invited to submit a page for the book about what Otago means to them. The pages were exhibited at the Otago Art Society during November and December 2023, and will be bound into a published book.

Marshall practices and teaches calligraphy, to assist students in understanding the skills required to produce the manuscripts they are studying. Marshall teaches courses on monsters and monstrosity in medieval literature, medieval misogyny and those who fought against it, and also teaches a class in a surveying course, covering the Hereford Mappa Mundi.

== Selected works ==
- Marshall, Simone Celine (2020). "The Poetical Works of Geoffrey Chaucer in the Nineteenth Century: Social Influences on Editorial Practices". Romantic Textualities. 0 (23): 218. doi:10.18573/romtext.80. Wikidata Q124159175.
- Marshall, Simone Celine (2011). "The 1807 Edition of the Poetical Works of Geoffrey Chaucer". Notes and Queries. 58 (2): 183–186. doi:10.1093/notesj/gjr053. Wikidata Q123773134.
- Marshall, Simone Celine (2007). "Engagement Theory, WebCT, and academic writing in Australia". International Journal of Education and Development Using Information and Communication Technology. 3 (2). ISSN 1814-0556. Wikidata Q124159197.
- Marshall, Simone Celine (2007). "Manuscript Agency and the Findern Manuscript". Neuphilologische Mitteilungen. 108 (2): 339–349. JSTOR 43344292. Wikidata Q124159253.
- Marshall, Simone Celine; Cusack, Carole Mary (2017), The medieval presence in the modernist aesthetic: unattended moments, vol. 11, Wikidata Q124159254
