= Andreas Grünschloß =

German scholar

Andreas Gruenschloss (German: Grünschloß) (born 1957) is a German scholar and was Professor of Religious Studies at University of Göttingen from 2002 to 2023. An ordained Protestant pastor, he is the author of books and scholarly articles about interfaith matters, Buddhism, Aztec religion, new religious movements and, lately, religious responses to the COVID19-crisis. He publishes both in German and in English and is a co-editor of the Marburg Journal of Religion.

== Academic career ==
Gruenschloss studied Protestant theology, religious studies and psychology at University of Tübingen, University of Chicago (M.A. in Religious Studies, 1984) and University of Heidelberg. (Ph.D. in Religious Studies and Missionary Science, 1992, followed by habilitation in 1998, University of Mainz). He is also an ordained Protestant pastor. Having first taught at University of Mainz, he became Professor of Religious Studies at University of Göttingen in 2002, where he stayed until his retirement in September 2023.

Gruenschloss has been a co-editor of the English-language Marburg Journal of Religion, a peer-reviewed academic Internet journal, since 1999.

In his research and publications, Gruenschloss is concerned with interfaith matters, especially the empirical analysis of inter-religious perceptions and forms of trans-religious hybridization. He has authored a book-length German-language study of the work of Wilfred Cantwell Smith (Religionswissenschaft als Welt-Theologie: Wilfred Cantwell Smiths interreligiöse Hermeneutik, 1994), described in the Journal of Ecumenical Studies as "the most comprehensive, balanced account and evaluation of the life and work of Wilfred Cantwell Smith". In Der eigene und der fremde Glaube: Studien zur interreligiösen Fremdwahrnehmung in Islam, Hinduismus, Buddhismus und Christentum (1999), he wrote about how members of one religion perceive those belonging to other faiths; he argues that as each religion postulates that it has privileged access to the knowledge of how things should be, it fails to see others as they really are, only ever perceiving them from a self-referential perspective as different: assuming a religious identity simultaneously creates the "other".

Gruenschloss has also written about new religious movements, notably UFO religions such as Raëlism and Fiat Lux, as well as Scientology and authors such as Erich von Däniken or Graham Hancock. Gruenschloss puts the appeal of UFO religions down to several factors. The thought that there should be angels or aliens overseeing human development is profoundly consoling; and members' sense that they are becoming "light workers" by joining such a movement allows them to feel enhanced self-worth, as they believe they are among the chosen few destined to prepare the New Age. Lastly, Gruenschloss says, as the established religions lose their mass appeal, it is only natural that some will be attracted to "freelance" spiritual workers; he sees the most effective response to this development not in an assertion of church tradition, but in retaining the ability to engage in dialogue. Observing that UFO religions tend to combine euhemerism (by reinterpreting celestial beings simply as morally and technologically more advanced aliens) with a distinctly "religious" personal quest, Gruenschloss has concluded that "UFO faith, therefore, can be understood to oscillate between disenchantment and re-enchantment."
