= The Jesus Dynasty =

2006 book by James Tabor

The Jesus Dynasty: The Hidden History of Jesus, His Royal Family, and the Birth of Christianity
- Author: James Tabor
- Language: English
- Publisher: Simon & Schuster
- Publication date: April 4, 2006
- Pages: 378
- ISBN: 978-0-7432-8723-4
- OCLC: 64487282
- Dewey Decimal: 232.9 22
- LC Class: BT270 .T33 2006

The Jesus Dynasty is a 2006 book written by James Tabor in which he develops the hypothesis that the original Jesus movement was a dynastic one, with the intention of overthrowing the rule of Herod Antipas; that Jesus of Nazareth was a royal messiah, while his cousin John the Baptist planned to be a priestly messiah.

The book explores speculative ideas, like the Talpiot Tomb possibly being Jesus' family tomb and the theory that Roman soldier Tiberius Julius Abdes Pantera might have been Jesus' father, though no definitive conclusions are reached.

The book received mixed reviews. Arthur J. Droge praised its bold reconstruction, while Richard Wightman Fox found it left readers unsure about the historical basis of the Jesus dynasty. Critics like Bert Jan Lietaert Peerbolte accused it of generating controversy rather than disseminating knowledge, whereas Jeffrey Bütz appreciated it as a valuable contribution to historical Jesus studies.

== Synopsis ==
By his parents' marriage, Jesus was better placed to be King of Israel than Herod Antipas was. The two contradictory blood lines in the gospels are seen as compatible if one belongs to Mary and the other to Joseph. In such a case, Jesus would have united a formidable list of families into his ancestors.

Jesus joined John the Baptist's movement, as John was a close relative of Jesus as well as his teacher. (John's mother being Mary's aunt which makes Jesus his first cousin once removed.) With Jesus as John's disciple, Jesus is quoted in the New Testament by saying:" Truly I tell you, among those born of women there has not risen anyone greater than John the Baptist.”

Both John and Jesus were involved in a Jewish grassroots movement called "The Way" which was a movement to give the Jewish people back their personal and religious and political power. It was a spiritual movement based on fighting oppression against the Romans and the Pharisees who were working with the Roman rulers in Judaea. Both men were prepared to bring about an uprising in Judaea, but John's arrest and execution caused Jesus to go underground to avoid the same fate. Eventually he resurfaced to carry on the Baptist's work alone.

Jesus was a charismatic teacher and possibly a faith healer. James, Simon and Jude were his half-brothers (since Jesus is not Joseph's son, in Tabor's view) and inherited the leadership after Jesus' death. His claim that the brothers of Jesus were members of his Disciples, has been called a misleading and fallacious reading of the biblical text. Tabor argues that the later, spiritualist, writings of Paul the Apostle polluted and effectively hijacked the movement, with the later Gospels following the Pauline point of view.

Tabor produces many supporting statements from the Bible and New Testament apocrypha, which escaped excision by the later Church Fathers, intent on selling the Pauline message at the expense of Jesus' dynastic one. The argument produces a portrait of a real man in a tumultuous time, who really believed that his actions would accomplish the end of the Roman occupation and a return of the Jewish kingdom.

The book also speculates about whether the Talpiot Tomb in Jerusalem was the tomb of Jesus or his relatives, and whether Tiberius Julius Abdes Pantera, a Roman soldier, was Jesus' father, although it reaches no definitive conclusions about either hypothesis.

== Reception ==
In a back-jacket endorsement Arthur J. Droge, professor of New Testament and early Christian literature and director at the University of California at San Diego, writes "James Tabor presents what may be the boldest reconstruction yet of the life and times of Jesus of Nazareth. Working with the surviving evidence like a CSI detective -- especially the testimonies concerning Jesus' family and the Jerusalem Nazarenes -- Tabor succeeds in reinscribing what has been lost (and in some cases erased) from the historical record. At once scholarly and accessible, Tabor's book may very well inaugurate a new phase in the quest for the historical Jesus."

Richard Wightman Fox, professor of history, the University of Southern California, writing in Slate (April 2006) said, "Ultimately Tabor leaves the reader confused about whether he thinks the Jesus dynasty is a historical fact or merely an intriguing conjecture" and that "Tabor seems stuck in an endless loop, squinting across the sands of time as much as the terrain of Galilee and Judea, holding out for some imagined "real" contact with the historical Jesus".

An extensive popular review by Jay Tolson appeared in the April 9, 2006 issue of U.S. News & World Report.

Bert Jan Lietaert Peerbolte from the Theological University of Kampen writing in the Society of Biblical Literature Review of Biblical Literature (June 2007) was highly critical of the book saying, "Some books are written to spread knowledge, others to generate controversy. This book falls into the latter category. In his Jesus Dynasty James Tabor presents a reconstruction of the Jesus movement from a perspective that purports to be a neutral view at the facts. Unfortunately, Tabor’s view is not neutral and his “facts” are not facts."

New Age author Jeffrey Bütz in The Secret Legacy of Jesus (2010), says that The Jesus Dynasty is "a long overdue and most welcome addition to our knowledge of the historical Jesus, which has, not surprisingly, been widely denigrated by conservative scholars."
