= Sex, Slander, and Salvation =

1994 book by James R. Lewis and J. Gordon Melton

Sex, Slander, and Salvation: Investigating The Family/Children of God
- Front cover portraying members with sandwich board signs predicting the End
- Author: James R. Lewis, J. Gordon Melton (editors)
- Language: English
- Subject: The Family International
- Publisher: Center for Academic Publication
- Publication date: 1994
- Publication place: United States
- ISBN: 0-9639501-2-6

Sex, Slander, and Salvation: Investigating The Family/Children of God is a 1994 book edited by J. Gordon Melton and James R. Lewis, on the Family International religious movement. It comprises 17 chapters of essays and research papers. The introduction was written by Lewis.

== Critical reception ==
Robert Balch, critiquing the book in a 1996 issue of Journal for the Scientific Study of Religion, wrote that it suffered from a "methodological flaw running throughout the book." He claimed that sources of information were limited exclusively to committed members and Family literature, which were not triangulated with ex-member testimony. Balch also expressed concern about the scholars being subjected to impression management by the Family, thus skewing their research data. He concluded that the book was worth having for the information on the Family but also for the "serious questions it raises about bias in the way new religions are studied."

Richard Singelenberg discussed the book in a review he wrote for the Journal of Contemporary Religion; he wrote favorably on it but considered it to have two flaws. One was the repeated characterization of law enforcement actions as "Gestapo Methods", including one time where it said the "Nazi jackboots are alive and well." Singelenberg also expressed concern at the paying of "scanty attention to the movement's doctrines on Judaism" and that there was no excuse for "excluding a thorough and detached analysis" of the movement's alleged anti-semitic beliefs. Despite these flaws, he concluded the book was a "reliable portrait of a movement in constant flux." Singelenberg lamented the fact that Sex, Slander, and Salvation was published just before David Berg's death and the Love Charter's reorganization of the Family International. Singelenberg emphasized that the two events would be sure to have "profound effects" on the Family.

James D. Chancellor, a Christian researcher who undertook his own study of the Family, wrote in 2001 that "a number of insightful articles" in Sex, Slander and Salvation were among the most useful sources he had consulted at the beginning of his own research. Benjamin Beit-Hallahmi, in the 2001 book Misunderstanding Cults, characterized the work as "made-to-order PR efforts (with a few scholarly papers which got in by honest mistakes on the part of both authors and editors)" and just one of the "extreme examples of the literature of apologetics that has dominated research on new religious movements for years." Stephen A. Kent and Theresa Krebs later alleged the use of "media homes" during the course of the researchers' studies for Sex, Slander and Salvation. "Media homes" were described by Kent and Krebs as follows: "Hand-picked individuals living in these well-funded facilities went through rehearsals about how to portray themselves and the group to media, scholars, and others who might scrutinize them." Kent and Krebs also noted question-and-answer pamphlets produced by the group to prevent members from "revealing sensitive information about the group."
