= Original Bible Project =

Project to produce a new English translation of the Bible

The Original Bible Project is a project to produce a re-ordered new translation of the Bible into English led by James Tabor. The Project is a non-profit organisation. The translation is expected to eventually be published under the name Transparent English Bible (TEB). By mid-2024, the project had published two books, one on the Genesis and one looking at selections of Bible writings.

The project was advertised as early as 1992 in the back of the Bible Review of the Biblical Archaeology Society, and an article Genesis Translation of the Transparent English Bible appeared in the liberal arts magazine of Augustana College in 2006. It has also been mentioned in book jacket biographies of Dr. Tabor. The Project's aim is to produce a new Bible version, the Transparent English Bible (TEB).

The initial translations of the project have already been cited in some non-scholarly works.

== Publications ==
The first book, Genesis was published in 2020.

The second book, Selections from the Hebrew Bible, was published in August 2022.

Other books will follow in a similar manner.

== Sample translation ==
Transparent English Bible (TEB) Genesis Chapter 1:1

^{1}At the first of ELOHIM creating the skies and the land -
^{2}and the land was desolation and emptiness; and darkness was over the face of the deep, and the spirit of ELOHIM was hovering over the face of the waters
^{3}and ELOHIM said, "Let there be light"; and it was light.
^{4}And ELOHIM saw the light, that it was good; and ELOHIM separated between the light and between the darkness.
^{5}And ELOHIM called to the light "day," and to the darkness he called "night." And it was evening and it was morning - day one.
