= The Politics of Religious Apostasy =

1998 book edited by Bromley, David G.

The Politics of Religious Apostasy: The Role of Apostates in the Transformation of Religious Movements
- Hardcover edition cover
- Editor: David G. Bromley
- Language: English
- Series: Religion in the Age of Transformation
- Subjects: Apostasy; Anti-cult movement
- Publisher: Praeger Publishers
- Publication date: 1998
- Publication place: United States
- Media type: Print (Hardcover)
- Pages: 256
- ISBN: 0-275-95508-7
- OCLC: 37608170
- Dewey Decimal: 306.6/9142 21
- LC Class: BL639.5 .P64 1998

The Politics of Religious Apostasy: The Role of Apostates in the Transformation of Religious Movements is a 1998 book edited by David G. Bromley. It presents studies by several sociologists of new religious movements on the role played by apostates (described as individuals that leave new religious movements to pursue opposition against their former group.) The volume examines the apostate's testimonies, their motivations, the narratives they construct to discredit their former movements, and their impact on the public controversy between such movements and society.

== Reception ==
The Social Science Journal refers to the book as a "superb effort to examine in depth the complexity and significance of the apostate role, and to illuminate the processes through which subversive evil is socially constructed. Taken together, the authors contribute a diverse array of theory, data and substantive insights that add to our knowledge of the inner-workings of new religious movements. I recommend this book for classes in organizations, sociology of religion, psychology of religion, group dynamics and related subjects".

The book was reviewed in the American Journal of Sociology, that found this work to be a "remarkably unified collection of high-quality essays by many leading sociologists of new religious movements."

The psychologist Michael Langone (2001) argues that some will accept uncritically the positive reports of current members without calling such reports, for example, "benevolence tales" or "personal growth tales." He asserts that only the critical reports of ex-members are called "tales" — a term he considers to imply falsehood or fiction. According to Langone, it wasn't until Zablocki (1996) that anyone had conducted a study to assess the truthfulness of so-called "atrocity tales."
