= Franklin Littell =

Theologian, Holocaust scholar

Dr. Franklin Hamlin Littell
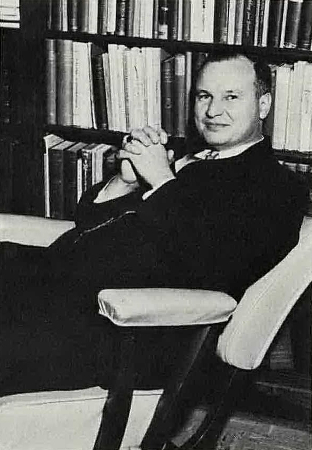
- Professor of Church Education, Southern Methodist University, in 1962
- Born: June 20, 1917; Syracuse, New York
- Died: May 23, 2009 (aged 91); Merion Station, Pennsylvania
- Education: Cornell College
- Church: Methodist
- Writings: The crucifixion of the Jews

Franklin Hamlin Littell (June 20, 1917 – May 23, 2009) was an American Protestant scholar. He is known for his writings rejecting supersessionism and, in light of the Holocaust, advocated educational programs to improve relations between Christians and Jews.

After spending nearly ten years in post-war Germany as Chief Protestant Religious Adviser in the High Command assigned especially to the task of deNazification during the occupation, he was deeply affected by the atrocities that had been committed during World War II, and thus dedicated his life to researching the Holocaust and bringing its tragic lessons in human rights to widespread public attention. In public meetings, on campuses and in churches, he raised one of the first voices of conscience in the post-war period, talking about the lessons of the Holocaust. Littell is regarded by some as a founder of the field of Holocaust studies, having established at several institutions masters and doctoral programs devoted to the study of the Holocaust (the latter at Temple University in 1976).

In his book Historical Atlas of Christianity, first published in 1976, he maintained that many Christian churches failed to deal honestly with their complicity in the murder of European Jews. In 1939 as a young Methodist minister he attended a Nazi rally in Nuremberg, and he would later formulate, in a paper entitled Holocaust and the Christians, that the lure of Nazism was caused by failures in Christian spirituality originating from the First Council of Nicea in 325 CE. He also wrote in theological support of Zionism.

== Writings ==
- The Anabaptist View of the Church (1957)
- The Free Church (1957)
- The Crucifixion of the Jews (1975)
- Historical Atlas of Christianity (1976)

== See also ==
- Religious antisemitism
