= Göran Larsson (theologian) =

Göran Larsson (born May 21, 1949) is a Swedish Theologian, ordained in the Church of Sweden and best known for his knowledge about and contacts with Judaism.

== Life ==
Larsson studied theology at Lund University receiving his Bachelor of Theology in 1973 and his Ph.D. in 1980. He was the director of the Swedish Theological Institute in Jerusalem 1979-1993 and senior research fellow at the University of Chicago Divinity School 1991–1992. He has published several books and articles about the relationship between Christianity and Judaism.

In 1990 he was awarded the Raoul Wallenberg Humanitarian Award in 1990.

== Selected published works ==
- 1980 Der Tosefta-Traktat Jom hak-Kippurim; Text, Übersetzung, Kommentar
- 1994 Fact or Fraud? The Protocols of the Elders of Zion
- 1997 Die Tosefta. Seder II: Moed. Jom ha-kippurim
- 1999 Bound for Freedom: The Book of Exodus in Jewish and Christian Traditions
