= Carole M. Cusack =

Australian historian of religion

Academic background
- Education: BA, PhD, MEd
- Alma mater: University of Sydney

Academic work
- Discipline: Religious studies

Carole M. Cusack is an Australian religious historian and author specialising in Early Medieval Northwestern Europe, western esotericism, and trends in contemporary religion. Cusack received her bachelor's degree in religious studies from the University of Sydney in 1986 and her PhD in 1986. She obtained a Master of Education in Educational Psychology in 2001. Cusack has been employed at the University of Sydney as a lecturer in religious studies since 1989 and has published a number of books during her career.

== Selected bibliography ==
- Conversion Among the Germanic Peoples (1998)
- This Immense Panorama: Studies in Honour of Eric J. Sharpe (1999), editor, with Peter Oldmeadow
- The End of Religions? Religion in an Age of Globalization (2001), editor, with Peter Oldmeadow
- Religion and Retributive Logic: Essays in Honour of Professor Garry W. Trompf (2010), editor, with Christopher H. Hartney
- Invented Religions: Imagination, Fiction and Faith (2010)
- The Sacred Tree: Ancient and Medieval Manifestations (2011)
- Lewis, James R.; ——, eds. (2014). Sacred Suicide. Ashgate Publishing. ISBN 978-1-4094-5086-3.
- The Medieval Presence in the Modernist Aesthetic: Unattended Moments (2017), editor, with Simone Marshall
