= CrossCurrents =

Peer-reviewed scientific journal

- Discipline: Theology
- Language: English
- Edited by: S. Brent Rodriguez-Plate

Publication details
- History: 1950–present
- Publisher: University of North Carolina Press on behalf of the Association for Public Religion in Intellectual Life (United States)
- Frequency: Quarterly

Standard abbreviations
- ISO 4: CrossCurrents

Indexing
- ISSN: 0011-1953 (print); 1939-3881 (web)
- LCCN: 55026985
- JSTOR: 00111953
- OCLC no.: 1565510

Links
- Journal homepage; Journal page at University of North Carolina Press website; Journal page at Association for Public Religion in Intellectual Life website

CrossCurrents is a quarterly peer-reviewed academic journal published by the Association for Public Religion and Intellectual Life. The editor-in-chief is S. Brent Rodriguez-Plate of Hamilton College. Before 1990, it was published by Cross Currents Corporation, under co-editors William Birmingham and Joseph Cunneen. They transferred publication to the association in 1990.

The journal began with the vision of Joseph Cunneen, a Catholic soldier in General Patton's army. Taking advantage of the G.I. Bill after World War II, Cunneen wanted to bring European religious thinking to the United States. As a result, the journal became committed to post-Holocaust theology and Jewish-Christian relations.

Over time, it expanded to encompass multiple religious traditions, including Islam, Buddhism, Hinduism, Native American religions, and other indigenous religions. Moreover, it remained dedicated to issues of social justice, publishing feminist theology in the 1960s, particularly the work of Rosemary Radford Ruether and Elisabeth Schüssler Fiorenza, as well as Black theology in the 1970s, notably that of James H. Cone. Additionally, it was among the pioneering English-language journals to publish works on Latin American liberation theology movement. Work in the journal is supplemented by an online magazine, The Commons.

== Abstracting and indexing ==
The journal is abstracted and indexed in:

- Atla Religion Database
- EBSCO databases
- MLA International Bibliography
- ProQuest databases
