= Eugene V. Gallagher =

American professor of religious studies (born 1950)

- Born: June 23, 1950 (age 75); United States
- Occupations: Professor, author

Eugene V. Gallagher (born June 23, 1950) is a retired American professor of religious studies at Connecticut College.

Gallagher is the Rosemary Park Professor Emeritus of Religious Studies at Connecticut College, where he worked from 1978 to 2015, and is currently an adjunct professor of Religious Studies at the College of Charleston.

His department lists his specializations as: History of religion, New religious movements, New Testament and early Christianity, Western scriptures and traditions. He is the author of several books, mainly on the topic of new religious movements.

In 1995 Gallagher and James D. Tabor, then an associate professor of religious studies at the University of North Carolina, co-authored Why Waco? Cults and the Battle for Religious Freedom in America. The book partly blamed the 1993 Waco siege, which resulted in the deaths of 76 members of the Branch Davidian sect, on a misunderstanding of religious issues by law enforcement personnel.

== Bibliography ==
- —— (1982). Divine Man or Magician: Celsus and Origen on Jesus. Chico: Scholars Press. ISBN 0-89130-542-4.
- —— (1990). Expectation and Experience: Explaining Religious Conversion. Atlanta: Scholars Press. ISBN 1-55540-276-3.
- Tabor, James D.; —— (1995). Why Waco?: Cults and the Battle for Religious Freedom in America. Berkeley: University of California Press. ISBN 0-585-05474-6.
- —— (2004). The New Religious Movements Experience in America. Westport: Greenwood Press. ISBN 0-313-32807-2.
- ——; Ashcraft, W. Michael (2006). Introduction to New and Alternative Religions in America. Westport: Greenwood Press. ISBN 0-275-98712-4.
- —— (2014). Reading and Writing Scripture in New Religious Movements: New Bibles and New Revelations. New York: Palgrave Macmillan. ISBN 978-1-137-43482-1.
- ——, ed. (2016). Visioning New and Minority Religions: Projecting the Future. New York: Routledge. ISBN 978-1-4724-6588-7.
- ——, ed. (2016). 'Cult Wars' in Historical Perspective: New and Minority Religions. New York: Routledge. ISBN 978-1-317-15667-3.
- ——; Maguire, Joanne (2018). The Religious Studies Skills Book: Close Reading, Critical Thinking, and Comparison. London: Bloomsbury Academic. ISBN 978-1-350-03374-0.
- ——; Willsky-Ciollo, Lydia (2021). New Religions: Emerging Faiths and Religious Cultures in the Modern World. Santa Barbara: ABC-CLIO. ISBN 978-1-4408-6235-9.
