= Jeffrey K. Hadden =

American professor of sociology (1937–2003)

Jeffrey K. Hadden (1937–2003) was an American professor of sociology. He began his teaching career at Western Reserve University and then at the University of Virginia commencing in 1972. Hadden earned his Ph.D. in 1963 at the University of Wisconsin–Madison, where he was trained as a demographer and human ecologist.

While teaching urban sociology at WRU, he co-authored with Louis H Massotti and Calvin J. Larsen Metropolis in crisis: social and political perspectives. With Massotti, he co-edited The Urbanization of the Suburbs (Sage Publications 1973) Hadden published numerous scholarly books and articles and essays on religion approaching the study of religion from the perspective of social movements theory and characterized his primary interest as the comparative study of religion and politics.

During the 1960s, Hadden studied and wrote about the involvement of liberal Protestant clergy in the Civil Rights Movement. He was probably best known for his studies of religious broadcasters and the emergence of the Christian Right in America during the 1980s, studying the ministries of Jerry Falwell in nearby Lynchburg, and Pat Robertson in Virginia Beach.

During the years of peak civil rights activity in the South, Evangelical clergy consistently criticized the involvement of liberal clergy on the grounds that religion and politics should not mix. Hadden's interest in religious broadcasters was significantly aroused as it became increasingly evident to him that they were themselves making overtures toward involvement and influence in the political process.

His first publication on the subject of religious broadcasting entitled "Soul-Saving Via Video" appeared in "Christian Century" in 1980.

In 1998, Hadden planned and oversaw the construction of three websites on religious freedom topics at the University of Virginia: The Religious Freedom Page, Religious Broadcasting, and The Religious Movements Homepage Project. The latter effort involved the contributions of hundreds of undergraduate students who took Hadden's New Religious Movements sociology course during the period.

In 1993 he edited a two-volume work entitled Handbook of Cults and Sects in America with David Bromley (Professor of Sociology at Virginia Commonwealth University).

Hadden published 25 books as well as numerous articles throughout his career. He died on January 26, 2003, of pancreatic cancer in Charlottesville, Virginia at age 66.

== Partial bibliography ==
Some of Hadden's books include

- Metropolis in crisis: social and political perspectives, (1967) F.E. Peacock, ASIN B0006D80Y4
- The Gathering Storm in the Churches, (1969) Doubleday. ISBN 0385033265
- Religion in Radical Transition, (1973) 166 pp. Transaction Publishers ISBN 0878550704
- Gideon's gang: A case study of the church in social action. (1974). 245pp, United Church Press, ISBN 0829802754
- Prime Time Preachers: The Rising Power of Televangelism. with Charles E. Swann. (1981). Reading, MA: Addison-Wesley Publishing.
- Prophetic Religions and Politics: Religion and the Political Order. (1986) 144 pp. Paragon House Publishers, ISBN 0913757535
- America's uneasy relationship with non-Christian and oriental religions. (1986) Thomas Jefferson Institute (1986)
- Televangelism: Power and Politics on God's Frontier. with Anson Shupe. (1988). New York: Henry Holt.
- Secularization and Fundamentalism Reconsidered with Anson Shupe. (1989). Paragon House. ISBN 0913757969
- Religion and the Social Order: The Handbook on Cults and Sects in America with Bromley D. (1993). JAI Press ISBN 1559384778
