= Journal of Religion and Violence =

- Discipline: Religious studies, theology
- Language: English
- Edited by: Margo S. Kitts

Publication details
- History: 2013-present
- Publisher: Philosophy Documentation Center (United States)
- Frequency: Triannual

Standard abbreviations
- ISO 4: J. Relig. Violence

Indexing
- ISSN: 2159-6808
- LCCN: 2011201815
- JSTOR: jreliviol
- OCLC no.: 699807153

Links
- Journal homepage; Online access

The Journal of Religion and Violence is a peer-reviewed academic journal covering the study of religion and violence. It publishes analyses of contemporary and historical religious groups involved in violent incidents, as well as studies on sacrifice, terrorism, inter- and intra-religious violence, mass suicide, war and religion, and religiously-legitimated violence against women. It also publishes reviews and special issues dedicated to relevant topics. The journal is included in JSTOR's Security Studies Collection.

It is indexed in the Atla Religion Database, ERIH PLUS and Index Theologicus, and has a Level 1 classification from the Publication Forum of the Federation of Finnish Learned Societies. The Journal of Religion and Violence is a hybrid open-access journal with a SHERPA/RoMEO "green" self-archiving policy. It is published by the Philosophy Documentation Center.
