= Canadian Journal of Sociology =

- Discipline: Sociology
- Language: English, French
- Edited by: Kevin D. Haggerty, Daniel Béland, Marta-Marika Urbanik

Publication details
- Publisher: University of Alberta (Canada)
- Frequency: Quarterly
- Impact factor: 0.500 (2014)

Standard abbreviations
- ISO 4: Can. J. Sociol.

Indexing
- ISSN: 0318-6431 (print); 1710-1123 (web)

Links
- Journal homepage; Online archive

The Canadian Journal of Sociology published research and theory by social scientists on Canadian and world culture. The journal ceased publication in 2022, with the final edition published in early 2023. The archives are hosted by the University of Alberta in Edmonton, Alberta.

== Abstracting and indexing ==
Canadian Journal of Sociology was abstracted and indexed in the Social Sciences Citation Index. According to the Journal Citation Reports, the journal had a 2014 impact factor of 0.500, ranking it 101st out of 142 journals in the category "Sociology".

== See also ==
- Journal of Indigenous Studies
