= Visible Ink Press =

Independent publishing company in Michigan

Visible Ink Press, LLC
- Founded: 1989
- Founder: Gale Research
- Country of origin: United States
- Headquarters location: Canton Charter Township, Michigan
- Distribution: Legato Publishers Group (US); Turnaround Publisher Services (UK)
- Publication types: Books
- Owner: Roger Janecke
- Official website: visibleinkpress.com

Visible Ink Press, LLC is a publisher of popular reference works. Its headquarters are in Canton Charter Township, Michigan in Metro Detroit. It was founded in 1989 as an imprint of Gale and later spun-off as an independent company in 2000. The Handy Answer Book Series is published by Visible Ink, as were the MusicHound Essential Album Guides and VideoHound's Golden Movie Retriever.

Robert Jackson of the Rocky Mountain News said in 1994 that Visible Ink Press had an annual tradition of "releasing quality books that deal with people of color".
