= James Tabor =

American Bible scholar

James Daniel Tabor (born 1946) is an American Biblical scholar and retired Professor of Ancient Judaism and Early Christianity in the Department of Religious Studies at the University of North Carolina at Charlotte, where he taught from 1989 until 2022 and was chair from 2004 to 2014. He previously held positions at Ambassador College (1968–70 while a student at Pepperdine University), the University of Notre Dame (1979–85), and the College of William and Mary (1985–89). Tabor is the founder and director of the Original Bible Project, a non-profit organization aimed to produce a re-ordered new translation of the Bible in English.

== Background ==
Tabor was born in Texas and lived all over the world as the son of an Air Force officer. He was raised in the Churches of Christ and attended Abilene Christian University, where he earned his BA degree in Koine Greek and Bible. While earning his MA from Pepperdine University he taught Greek and Hebrew part-time at Ambassador College, founded by Herbert W. Armstrong, founder and president of the Worldwide Church of God.

Tabor earned his PhD at the University of Chicago in 1981 in New Testament and Early Christian literature, with an emphasis on the origins of Christianity and ancient Judaism, including the Dead Sea Scrolls, John the Baptist, Jesus, James the Just, and Paul the Apostle. The author of six books and over 50 articles, Tabor is frequently consulted by the media on these topics and has appeared on numerous television and radio programs.

During the Branch Davidian siege in Waco, Texas in 1993, Tabor and fellow religion scholar J. Phillip Arnold "realized that in order to deal with David Koresh, and to have any chance for a peaceful resolution of the Waco situation, one would have to understand and make use of these biblical texts." After contacting the FBI, they sent Koresh an alternative interpretation of the Book of Revelation which persuaded Koresh to leave the compound when he had finished a document on "the seven seals", but left the FBI skeptical, and had the compound stormed by Federal forces.

== Major publications and research ==
His first book was a study of the mysticism of the apostle Paul titled Things Unutterable (1986), based on his University of Chicago dissertation.

In 1992 Tabor turned to an analysis of attitudes toward religious suicide and martyrdom in the ancient world, the results of which appeared as A Noble Death, published by HarperSanFrancisco in 1992 (co-authored with Arthur Droge).

In 1995, he published Why Waco? Cults and the Battle for Religious Freedom in America (University of California Press), which he co-authored with Eugene Gallagher, which explored what had actually happened during the Waco siege. In 1995 he testified before Congress as an expert witness on the siege.

== The Jesus Dynasty ==
In 2006 Tabor published The Jesus Dynasty, which interprets Jesus as an apocalyptic Messiah whose extended family founded a royal dynasty in the days before the destruction of Jerusalem in 70 AD. The form of Christianity that grew out of this movement, led by the apostle Paul, was, according to Tabor, a decisive break with the Ebionite-like original teachings of John the Baptist and Jesus.

Richard Wightman Fox, professor of history at the University of Southern California, writing in Slate (April 2006) said, "Ultimately Tabor leaves the reader confused about whether he thinks the Jesus dynasty is a historical fact or merely an intriguing conjecture," and that "Tabor seems stuck in an endless loop, squinting across the sands of time as much as the terrain of Galilee and Judea, holding out for some imagined 'real' contact with the historical Jesus".

An extensive popular review by Jay Tolson appeared in the April 9, 2006, issue of U.S. News & World Report.

Bert Jan Lietaert Peerbolte from the Theological University of Kampen writing in the Society of Biblical Literature Review of Biblical Literature (June 2007) was highly critical of the book saying, "Some books are written to spread knowledge, others to generate controversy. This book falls into the latter category. In his Jesus Dynasty James Tabor presents a reconstruction of the Jesus movement from a perspective that purports to be a neutral view at the facts. Unfortunately, Tabor's view is not neutral and his 'facts' are not facts."

New Age author Jeffrey Bütz in The Secret Legacy of Jesus (2010), says that The Jesus Dynasty is "a long overdue and most welcome addition to our knowledge of the historical Jesus, which has, not surprisingly, been widely denigrated by conservative scholars."

Bart Ehrman finds his views "overly speculative".

== Other activities ==
Tabor is chief editor of the Original Bible Project, an effort to produce a historical-linguistic translation of the Bible with notes.

Tabor has been involved in research on a tomb found in 1980 in Jerusalem in the area of East Talpiot. It contained ossuaries with the names Jesus son of Joseph, two Marys, Joseph, Matthew, and Jude son of Jesus. In the book, The Jesus Dynasty, Tabor had discussed the possibilities that this tomb might be linked to Jesus of Nazareth and his family. He was a consultant for the film, The Lost Tomb of Jesus produced by James Cameron and Simcha Jacobovici and shown in March 2007. In 2012 Tabor published, with co-author Simcha Jacobovici, The Jesus Discovery: The New Archaeological Find That Reveals the Birth of Christianity, which documented the exploration of a sealed tomb in Armon Hanatziv by remote robotic cameras, less than 200 feet from the first tomb. They claimed that the 2,000-year-old cave might be the burial site of Jesus's disciples—a claim which the majority of scholars reject.

Tabor has also appeared in all three seasons of The Naked Archaeologist, with Simcha Jacobovici. Tabor's works are promoted by the educational charity United Israel World Union. He co-hosts tours of the Holy Land which are conducted by this organization.

== Books ==
- The Lost Mary: Rediscovering the Mother of Jesus, Knopf, 2025, ISBN 978-1101947845
- Restoring Abrahamic Faith, 4th. ed., 2025, ISBN 979-8284420638
- Paul and Jesus: How the Apostle Transformed Christianity, Simon & Schuster, 2012, ISBN 978-1-4391-2331-7
- The Jesus Discovery: The New Archaeological Find That Reveals the Birth of Christianity (with Simcha Jacobovici), Simon & Schuster, 2012, ISBN 978-1-4516-5040-2
- The Jesus Dynasty: A New Historical Investigation of Jesus, His Royal Family, and the Birth of Christianity, Simon & Schuster, 2006, ISBN 0-7432-8723-1 & ISBN 0-00-722058-8
- Invitation to the Old Testament (with Celia Brewer Sinclair), 2005, ISBN 0-687-49590-3
- Why Waco?: Cults and the Battle for Religious Freedom in America (with Eugene V. Gallagher), 1995, ISBN 0-520-20899-4
- A Noble Death: Suicide and Martyrdom Among Christians and Jews in Antiquity (with Arthur J Droge), 1992, ISBN 0-06-062095-1
- Things Unutterable: Paul's Ascent to Paradise in Its Graeco-Roman, Judaic and Early Christian Contexts, 1986, ISBN 0-8191-5643-4 & ISBN 0-8191-5644-2 (based on Tabor's University of Chicago dissertation. Named by the Journal of Religion as one of the ten best scholarly studies on Paul of the 1980s.)
