= Dean M. Kelley =

American legal scholar

- Born: June 1, 1926; Cheyenne, Wyoming
- Died: May 11, 1997 (aged 70); West Swanzey, New Hampshire

Dean M. Kelley (June 1, 1926 – May 11, 1997) was an American legal scholar, religious freedom advocate, author, and executive with the National Council of Churches (NCC), where his work was mainly concerned with religious liberty issues. He also served on the board of the American Civil Liberties Union (ACLU).

Kelley opposed a constitutional amendment allowing organized prayer in public schools, doubting that anyone, no matter how well-intentioned, was capable of writing prayers that would be acceptable to everyone and still be meaningful. His 1972 book, Why Conservative Churches are Growing, is said by the Encyclopedia of Religion in American Politics to be seminal in the study of the relationship of religion and politics in the United States.

In Why Conservative Churches are Growing, Kelley pointed out what he saw as the essential difference between liberal and conservative churches: conservative churches concentrated on spiritual needs, liberal churches on political causes, which causes were better promoted by political organizations such as the Democratic Party and the Americans for Democratic Action. He also predicted the ongoing decline of the liberal churches, based on his extensive research, and his conclusions earned him widespread opprobrium on the Left. The work contains a strong implied warning to those pastors on the right who would politicize their churches.

His 1977 study, Why Churches Should Not Pay Taxes, is considered "essential reading" for those who support tax exemptions for religious organizations, according to James Dunn, executive director of the Baptist Joint Committee on Public Affairs. Strongly supporting the separation of church and state, he has said that the best thing government can do to help religion is "leave it alone."

== Biography ==
Dean Kelley was born on June 1, 1926, in Cheyenne, Wyoming. He graduated from University of Denver in 1946 and from the Iliff School of Theology, where he received a master's degree in theology, in 1949. In 1946 he married the former Maryon Hoyle. He worked as a minister for United Methodist churches in Colorado and New York until 1960, when he joined the NCC. In 1964 he was chosen for a leadership and spokesman role by the coalition lobbying the United States Congress to defeat an effort to promote school prayer. He died on May 11, 1997, in West Swanzey, New Hampshire.

== Bibliography ==
- Why Conservative Churches Are Growing, Harper & Row, 1972, ASIN: B00268XMJU
- Why Churches Should Not Pay Taxes, Harper & Row, 1977, ISBN 0-06-064302-1
- Government Intervention in Religious Affairs, Pilgrim Press, 1982, ISBN 0-8298-0602-4
- Law of Church and State in America, Kelley's final work, published online by the First Amendment Center.
