= Anson D. Shupe =

American sociologist and author (1948–2015)

- Born: Anson David Shupe Jr. January 21, 1948; Buffalo, New York
- Died: May 4, 2015 (aged 67)

Anson David Shupe, Jr. (21 January 1948 – 4 May 2015) was an American sociologist and author noted for his studies of religious groups and their countermovements, family violence and clergy misconduct.

== Early life and education ==
Anson David Shupe Jr. was born in Buffalo, New York to Anson D. Shupe Sr. and Elizabeth Frances Shupe (née Joslin). He graduated from Mt. Lebanon High School near Pittsburgh, Pennsylvania, and attended the College of Wooster.

== Work ==
Shupe was a professor of sociology at the Indiana University-Purdue University Fort Wayne campus at Fort Wayne, Indiana. He completed his doctorate in political sociology at Indiana University in 1975 and held office in various professional associations, including the Society for the Scientific Study of Religion and the Association for the Sociology of Religion, and the Association for the Scientific Study of Religion. Shupe often collaborated with other scholars, notably David G. Bromley and Jeffrey K. Hadden.

An advocate for religious freedom, Shupe conducted fieldwork on the Unification Church and other new religious movements, as well as their opponents. Together with David G. Bromley, Shupe was considered one of the foremost social science authorities on the anti-cult movement, based on a series of books and articles on the topic he coauthored with Bromley.

Other areas Shupe researched included the New Christian Right, religious broadcasting, and the political impact of fundamentalism; he also wrote about family violence and clergy misconduct, i.e. violent or exploitative behaviour on the part of pastors, ministers or gurus. He frequently acted as a consultant to attorneys in lawsuits involving issues of religious freedom or clergy abuse.

== Death ==
Shupe died on May 4, 2015, at the age of 67.

== Bibliography ==
=== Books ===
- Bromley, David G.; —— (1979). "Moonies" in America: Cult. Church. and Crusade. SAGE Publications.
- ——; Bromley, David G. (1980). The New Vigilantes: Deprogrammers, Anti-Cultists, and the New Religions. SAGE Publications.
- —— (1981). Six Perspectives on New Religions: A Case Study Approach. Edwin Mellen Press. ISBN 0-88946-983-0.
- Bromley, David G.; —— (1981). Strange Gods: The Great American Cult Scare. Beacon Press. ISBN 0-8070-3256-5.
- ——; Bromley, David G.; Oliver, Donna L. (1984). The Anti-Cult Movement in America: A Bibliography and Historical Survey. Garland Press.
- ——; Bromley, David G. (1986). A Documentary History of the Anti-Cult Movement. University of Texas Center for Social Research Press.
- Heinerman, John; —— (1986). The Mormon Corporate Empire: The Eye-Opening Report on the Church and Its Political and Financial Agenda. Beacon Press. ISBN 0-8070-0406-5.
- Hadden, Jeffrey K.; —— (1988). Televangelism, Power and Politics on God's Frontier. Henry Holt and Company. ISBN 0-8050-0778-4.
- —— (1991). The Darker Side of Virtue: Corruption, Scandal, and the Mormon Empire. Prometheus Books. ISBN 0-87975-654-3.
- Misztal, Bronislaw; ——, eds. (1992). Religion and Politics in Comparative Perspective: Revival of Religious Fundamentalism in East and West. Praeger Publishers. ISBN 0-275-94218-X.
- ——; Bromley, David G., eds. (1994). Anti-Cult Movements in Cross-Cultural Perspective. Garland Publishing. ISBN 0-8153-1428-0.
- Stacey, William A.; Hazlewood, Lonnie R.; —— (1994). The Violent Couple. Praeger Publishers.
- ——; Misztal, Bronislaw, eds. (1998). Religion, Mobilization, and Social Action. Praeger Publishers. ISBN 0-275-95625-3.
- ——; Stacey, William A.; Darnell, Susan E., eds. (2000). Bad Pastors: Clergy Misconduct in Modern America. New York University Press. ISBN 0-8147-8147-0.
- ——; Darnell, Susan E. (2006). Agents of Discord: Deprogramming, Pseudo-Science, and the American Anticult Movement. Transaction Publishers. ISBN 0-7658-0323-2.
- —— (2007). Spoils of the Kingdom: Clergy Misconduct and Religious Community. University of Illinois Press. ISBN 978-0-252-03159-5.

=== Chapters ===
- Shupe, Anson; Darnell, Susan E.; Moxon, Kendrick (2002). "The Cult Awareness Network and the Anticult Movement: Implications for NRMs in America". In Davis, Derek; Hankins, Barry (eds.). New Religious Movements and Religious Liberty in America. Waco, TX: J.M.Dawson Institute of Church-State Studies and Baylor University Press. pp. 21–43. ISBN 0-929182-64-2.
- "The North American Anti-cult Movement: Vicissitudes of Success and Failure." in The Oxford Handbook of New Religious Movements (with David G. Bromley and Susan E. Darnell), ed. by James R. Lewis. NY: Oxford University Press, 2004, pp. 184–205.
- "Anticult Movements" entry in Lindsay Jones, editor-in-chief, Encyclopedia of Religion. 2nd edition. Vol. 1 Thomson/Macmillan 2005, pp. 395–7.
- Shupe, Anson (2005). "Deprogramming". In Jones, Lindsay (ed.). Encyclopedia of Religion (Vol. 4) (2nd ed.). Detroit, MI: Macmillan. pp. 2291–2293. ISBN 9780028657370.
- Shupe, Anson (2016). "The North American Anticult Movement". In Lewis, James R.; Tøllefsen, Inga (eds.). The Oxford Handbook of New Religious Movements: Volume II. Oxford University Press. pp. 117–142. ISBN 9780190466176. doi:10.1093/oxfordhb/9780190466176.013.9

== Assessment ==
- Jackson W. Carroll, Review of In The Name of All That's Holy, Review of Religious Research 38 (1996): 90-91.
- Hans A. Baer, Review of The Darker Side of Virtue, Journal for the Scientific Study of Religion, 31 (1992): 242-243.
- A.J. Pavlos, Review of Six Perspectives on New Religions, Journal for the Scientific Study of Religion, 22 (1983): 95-96.
- Stephen A. Kent and Theresa Krebs, "When Scholars Know Sin: Alternative Religions and Their Academic Supporters," Skeptic, 6/3 (1988): 36-44. Also see J. Gordon Melton, Anson D. Shupe and James R. Lewis, "When Scholars Know Sin" Forum Reply to Kent and Krebs, Skeptic, 7/1 (1999): 14-21.
- Hansen, Susan (June 1997) "Did Scientology Strike Back?", The American Lawyer.
- Beit-Hallahmi, Benjamin (September 2003). "Scientology: Religion or racket?". Marburg Journal of Religion. Archived from the original on April 16, 2009.
