= Marburg Journal of Religion =

- Discipline: Religious studies
- Language: Multilingual
- Edited by: Edith Franke

Publication details
- History: 1996–present
- Publisher: University of Marburg (Germany)
- Frequency: Annual
- Open access: Yes

Standard abbreviations
- ISO 4: Marbg. J. Relig.

Indexing
- ISSN: 1612-2941
- OCLC no.: 44277913

Links
- Journal homepage

The Marburg Journal of Religion is a peer-reviewed online academic journal that publishes articles on empirical and theoretical studies of religion. The first issue was published in April 1996. The original concept was developed by Michael Pye together with his assistant Richard Böhme, who was the first web editor. The editorial team was broadened in 1999 to include Peter Antes (Hannover) and Andreas Grünschloß (Göttingen) and in 2007 Edith Franke (Marburg). Doreen Christen became web editor in 2002. The first separate reviews editor was Monika Schrimpf (from 2001) and this role was taken up by Katja Triplett from 2003.

Papers published in the Marburg Journal of Religion are documented and abstracted in the bibliographical journal Science of Religion, now published by Brill Publishers in Leiden. The abstracts published in the Marburg Journal of Religion itself may be published elsewhere on condition that full documentation of the article is provided.
