= Journal of Church and State =

- Discipline: Religious studies, Political science
- Language: English
- Edited by: Jerold Waltman

Publication details
- History: 1959–present
- Publisher: Oxford University Press on behalf of the J. M. Dawson Institute of Church-State Studies (Baylor University)
- Frequency: Quarterly

Standard abbreviations
- ISO 4: J. Church State

Indexing
- ISSN: 0021-969X (print); 2040-4867 (web)
- OCLC no.: 639087108

Links
- Journal homepage; Online access; Online archive

The Journal of Church and State is a quarterly peer-reviewed academic journal of religious studies and political science, covering issues related to the First Amendment to the United States Constitution. It is published by Oxford University Press on behalf of the J. M. Dawson Institute of Church-State Studies (Baylor University). It was established in 1959. The editor-in-chief is Jerold Waltman (Baylor University).
