= Stuart A. Wright =

Sociologist of religion and law

Stuart A. Wright is an American sociology professor and author. He is the former College of Arts & Sciences (COAS) Research Professor in Sociology and now emeritus professor of sociology in the Department of Sociology and Anthropology at Lamar University in Beaumont, Texas.

His book Patriots, Politics, and the Oklahoma City Bombing examines the right-wing groups that facilitated the Oklahoma City bombing in 1995. Wright went on to work on the legal defense team for Timothy McVeigh, arguing against his characterization as a "lone wolf".

In an article in the Journal for the Scientific Study of Religion, Wright sought to defend the criminal actions of the Rajneesh movement, including the 1984 Rajneeshee bioterror attack. Wright depicts the group as the victim of bias, and claims that immigration authorities were manipulated into performing their normal role, even though the group was found by authorities to be involved in a record number of cases of immigration fraud.

== Bibliography ==
- Armageddon in Waco: Critical Perspectives on the Branch Davidian Conflict, University Of Chicago Press (September 20, 1995), ISBN 0-226-90845-3.
- The Demise of Religion: How Religions End, Die or Dissipate , Bloomsbury Academic Publishers (December 2020), ISBN 978-1-3501-6291-4.
- Patriots, Politics, and the Oklahoma City Bombing (Cambridge Studies in Contentious Politics), Cambridge University Press (June 30, 2007), ISBN 0-521-69419-1.
- Saints under Siege: The Texas State Raid on the Fundamentalist Latter Day Saints (with James T. Richardson) (August 2011), New York University Press, ISBN 978-0-8147-9529-3.
- Storming Zion: Government Raids on Religious Communities (with Susan J. Palmer) (2016) Oxford University Press, ISBN 978-0-19-539890-8.
