= David G. Bromley =

American academic and sociologist (born 1941)

- Born: 1941 (age 84–85)
- Occupations: Professor, author

Academic background
- Education: Colby College (B.A.); Duke University (M.A., Ph.D.)

David G. Bromley (born 1941) is a professor of sociology at Virginia Commonwealth University, Richmond, VA and the University of Virginia, Charlottesville, VA, specialized in sociology of religion and the academic study of new religious movements. He has written extensively about cults, new religious movements, apostasy, and the anti-cult movement.

== Education and career ==
Bromley received his B.A. in sociology (1963) from Colby College. He then obtained his M.A. (1966) and Ph.D. (1971) from Duke University.

He began his professional teaching career at the University of Virginia, where he taught from 1968 to 1974. He then taught at the University of Texas at Austin (1976–1980), and University of Hartford (1980–1983). Since 1983 he has held his professorial post at the University of Virginia and also at Virginia Commonwealth University.

His primary area of teaching and research is sociology of religion, with a specialization in the academic study of new religious movements. He was also director of the Institute for Social Research at the University of Hartford and chairman of Department of Sociology and Anthropology at the University of Virginia.

From 1992 to 1995, Bromley was the editor of the Journal for the Scientific Study of Religion, published by the Society for the Scientific Study of Religion, and was between 1991 and 2003 one of the editors of Religion and the Social Order, an annual serial published by the Association for the Sociology of Religion.

Regarding the definition of new religious movements, Bromley distinguishes them from other religious groups based on the concept of "alignment" with both dominant social institutions and dominant cultural patterns in a given society. While dominant religious groups are aligned with both, sectarian religious groups reject the dominant social institutions but at the same time accept at least some of the dominant cultural patterns. New religious movements reject both dominant social institutions and cultural patterns, and are in turn rejected by mainline institutions and cultural agencies as cults. For instance, according to Bromley the Amish are a sectarian religious group rather than a new religious movement because they operate outside the dominant institutions of modern society, yet accept key elements of the dominant Christian cultural pattern.

Bromley has written about the rise of an anti-cult movement in the 1970s and 1980s, and the accompanying controversies involving allegations of brainwashing and deprogramming. He defined the anti-cult movement in 1981 as the amalgam of groups who embrace the brainwashing theory.

Bromley has also written about apostasy, cults and religions. His theory of apostasy is based on the notion of allegiance. In its dealings with the larger society, Bromley argues, religious groups can be either allegiant, contestant, or subversive of mainline values and institutions. Those who leave allegiant groups are "defectors", and the allegiant groups, protected by their popularity, may dismiss them as "problem individuals". Groups perceived by the society as "subversive" have "apostates", who claim that the movements they have left are dangerous or criminal, and are taken seriously by mainline institutions and media. Somewhere in the middle are "whistleblowers", who expose negative features not previously well-known of contestant (and sometimes also of allegiant) religious groups.

Bromley has expressed opposition to the claims of brainwashing and the practice of deprogramming. Bromley compared these social conflicts to witch-hunts of the late Middle Ages, and has claimed that civil liberties guaranteeing religious freedom were threatened. He has criticized the tactics of anti-cultists and their claims over brainwashing in several books and articles coauthored with Anson Shupe, such as Strange Gods, Moonies in America, and The New Vigilantes.

=== Faculty positions ===
- Professor, Department of Sociology and Anthropology, Virginia Commonwealth University: 1983-
- Affiliate Professor, Department of Religious Studies, Virginia Commonwealth University: 1994-
- Chairman, Department of Sociology and Anthropology, Virginia Commonwealth University: 1983–1986
- Head, Department of Sociology, University of Hartford: 1980–1983
- Associate Professor, Department of Sociology, University of Hartford: 1980–1983
- Director, Institute for Social Research, University of Hartford: 1980–1983
- Associate Professor, Department of Sociology, The University of Texas at Arlington: 1974–1980
- Acting Chairman, Department of Sociology, The University of Texas at Arlington: 1976–1977
- Assistant Professor, Department of Sociology and Anthropology, University of Virginia: 1968–1974

== Books ==
- "Moonies" in America: Cult, Church and Crusade. Beverly Hills: SAGE Publications, 1979. (with Anson Shupe).
- The New Vigilantes: Deprogrammers, Anti-Cultists, and the New Religions. Beverly Hills: SAGE Publications, 1980. 267 pp. (with Anson Shupe).
- Strange Gods: The Great American Cult Scare. Boston: Beacon Press, 1981 (with Anson Shupe)
- The Anti-Cult Movement in America: A Bibliography and Historical Survey (with Anson Shupe and Donna L. Oliver). New York and London: Garland, 1984.
- The Brainwashing/Deprogramming Controversy: Historical, Sociological, Psychological and Legal Perspectives. New York: Edwin Mellen Press, 1984. (edited with James T. Richardson).
- New Christian Politics. Macon: Mercer University Press, 1984. 288 pp. (edited with Anson Shupe).
- The Future of New Religious Movements. Macon: Mercer University Press, 1987. 278 pp. (edited with Phillip Hammond).
- Falling from the Faith: The Causes and Consequences of Religious Apostasy. Newbury Park: SAGE Publications, 1988. (edited)
- Krishna Consciousness in the West. Lewisburg: Bucknell University Press, 1988. 290pp. (edited with Larry Shinn).
- The Satanism Scare. Hawthorne, NY: Aldine de Gruyter, 1991. 320 pp. (edited with James Richardson and Joel Best), ISBN 0202303780.
- Anticult Movements in Cross-Cultural Perspective. New York: Garland Publishers, 1994 (edited with Anson Shupe).
- The Politics of Religious Apostasy: The Role of Apostates in the Transformation of Religious Movements. Westport, CT: Praeger Publishers, 1998. (edited)
- A Tale of two Theories: Brainwashing and Conversion as Competing Political Narratives, in Benjamin Zablocki and Thomas Robbins, eds. Misunderstanding Cults: Searching for Objectivity in a Controversial Field (Toronto: University of Toronto Press, 2001).
- Toward Reflexive Ethnography. Volume 9: Religion and the Social Order (edited with Lewis Carter). Oxford: Elsevier, 2001.
- Cults, Religion, and Violence. Cambridge: Cambridge University Press, 2002. (Edited with J. Gordon Melton)
- Cults and New Religions: A Brief History (with Douglas E. Cowan, Wiley-Blackwell 2007)
