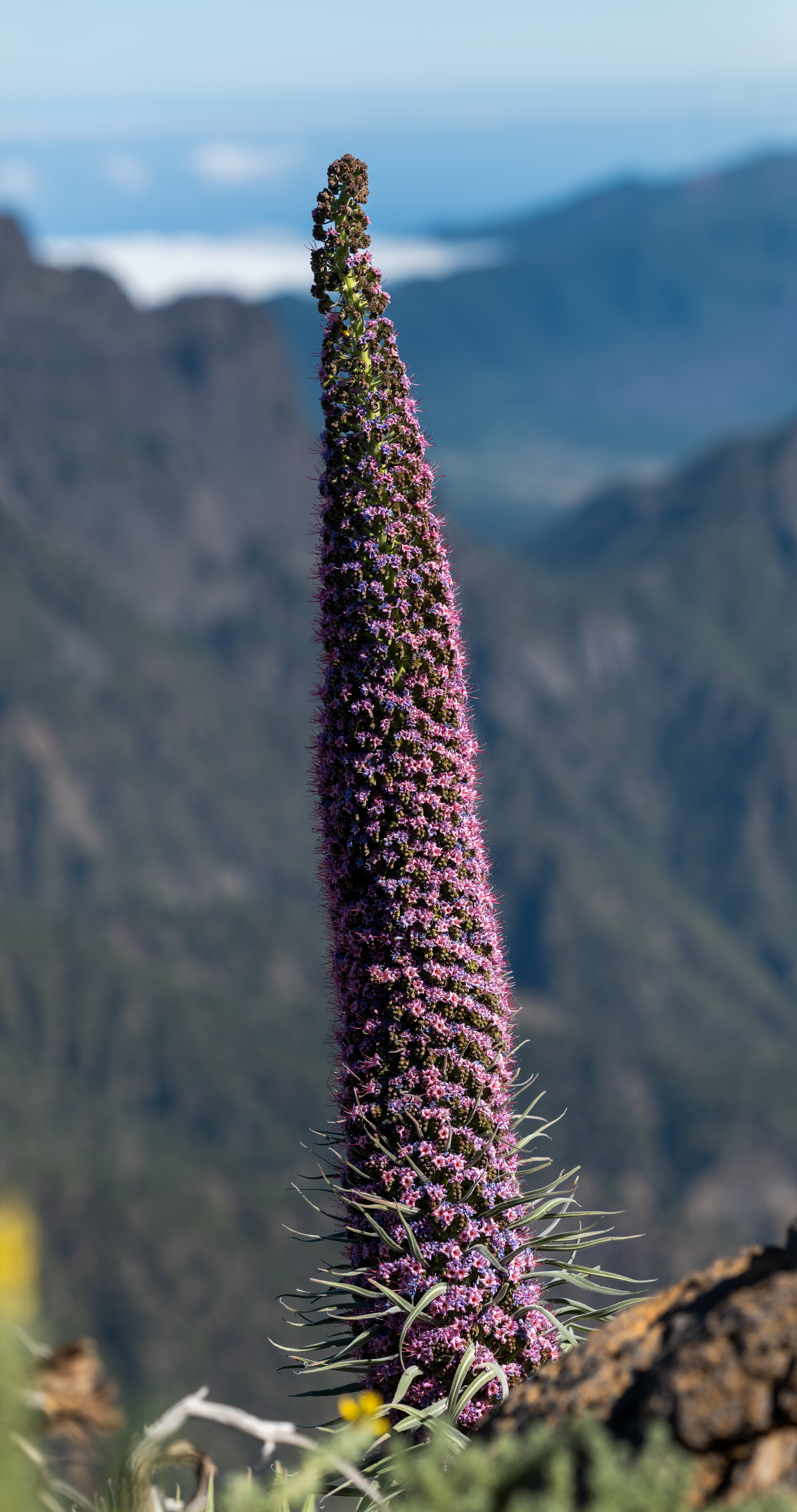
- Flowering pink tajinaste at the Roque de Los Muchachos Observatory

Scientific classification
- Kingdom: Plantae
- Clade: Embryophytes
- Clade: Tracheophytes
- Clade: Angiosperms
- Clade: Eudicots
- Clade: Asterids
- Order: Boraginales
- Family: Boraginaceae
- Genus: Echium
- Species: E. perezii

Binomial name
- Echium perezii Sprague
- La Palma, in the Canary Islands

Synonyms
- Echium bourgaeanum var. trichosiphon Svent.; Echium coeleste Stapf; Echium wildpretii subsp. trichosiphon (Svent.) Bramwell

= Echium perezii =

Species of flowering plant

Echium perezii, the pink tajinaste, is a species of Echium that is found high up in the area of La Caldera de Taburiente on the Canary Island of La Palma. Like its sister plant on Tenerife, this plant forms a large rosette of silvery leaves which eventually give rise to tall spikes of bright pink flowers about 2 metres (6 ft 7 in) in height. The plant is biennial and dies after flowering. This plant can be grown in gardens, but requires good drainage and fairly mild conditions. The plant hates water falling in the centre of the rosette and will often rot in such conditions.

The term tajinaste is borrowed from Guanche, an extinct language spoken by the inhabitants of the Canary Islands prior to their colonisation by Spain, and is used to refer to various other local species of Echium. These include the red tajinaste on Tenerife, the tajinaste palmero de cumbre also on La Palma, the white tajinaste in Gran Canaria, the critically endangered blue tajinaste on La Gomera, and tajinaste de jandía on Fuerteventura.

== Taxonomy ==
=== Taxonomical history ===
There has been debate other whether pink tajinaste correspond to a subspecies of Echium wildpretii of Tenerife (as Echium wildpretii subsp. trichosiphon) or a species in its own right.

It was first described in 1914 by the Scottish botanist Thomas Archibald Sprague under the name Echium perezii. He considered it as separate from the Tenerife taxon due to its loose clusters of flowers, and differences in leaf connection and colour.

Later, in 1951, it was described as a variety Echium bourgaeanum var. trichosiphon by the Swedish botanist Eric Ragnor Sventenius. In 1972, Bramwell recognized it as a subspecies of E. wildpretii rather than a variety.

Based on the increased genetic diversity of pink tajinaste compared to the red tajinaste found on Tenerife, and morphological similarity to their sister species Echium pininana, which is also found on La Palma, it is likely the lineage originated on La Palma before migrating to Tenerife.

=== Etymology ===
The epithet perezii honours Dr. G. V. Perez, a botanist from Tenerife who accompanied Sprague during his expedition to the Canary Islands.

== Distribution and habitat ==
Echium wildpretii is endemic to the sub-alpine region of La Palma, from around 2,000 metres (6,600 ft) above sea level to the highest point of the island at 2,425 metres (7,956 ft). This region experiences harsh conditions, with average annual temperatures of around 13 °C (55 °F) and very little precipitation. The area of this region is also small, just 15 square kilometres (5.8 sq mi), which means the species is vulnerable to changes in its habitat due to natural disasters.

== Ecology ==
Echium wildpretii is biennial, taking two years to grow, flowering in late spring to early summer before dying. Like other species of Echium they are abundant in nectar, and are often visited by native species of insects and birds.
