= The New Heretics of France =

2011 book by Susan J. Palmer

- Cover of the first edition
- Author: Susan J. Palmer
- Language: English
- Publisher: Oxford University Press
- Publication date: October 21, 2011
- Publication place: United Kingdom/United States
- Pages: 251
- ISBN: 978-0-19-973521-1
- OCLC: 695683654
- Dewey Decimal: 200.944
- LC Class: BP604.2.F8P35 2011

The New Heretics of France: Minority Religions, la République, and the Government-Sponsored "War on Sects" is a book by Susan J. Palmer. It was published in 2011 by Oxford University Press. Palmer is a sociologist of religion who has authored several other books on new religious movements (NRMs), and is a professor in religious studies. The book focuses on what Palmer calls the "French sect wars" – the anti-cult efforts of the French government and anti-cult groups – placing it into historical context and analyzing it along with the French conception of secularism, laïcité.

The book is split into three sections, with the first discussing the development of the anti-cult movement in France and its roots in the French Revolution. The second profiles six case study NRMs and their involvement in the "sect wars": Aumism, the Church of Scientology, the Raëlian movement, Tabitha's Place, Horus, and Néo-Phare. The third section contains Palmer's conclusions on French secularism, the anti-cult movement in France, and what drives it. The book received largely positive reviews, with most reviewers praising the observations, thesis, and case studies of the individual groups, as well as the coverage of a hard to research topic. Some aspects of the historical context given received a more mixed reception, with some commentators criticizing its accuracy and lack of precision. Some reviewers noted or criticized the writing as overly opinionated.

== Background and publication history ==
The New Heretics of France was published October 21, 2011 by Oxford University Press. Its author, Susan J. Palmer, is a sociologist of religion and researcher of new religious movements, as well as a professor in the Religious Studies department of Dawson College and Concordia University. She has authored several other books on the topic. There was an increase in NRMs in the west starting in the 1960s; many groups were highly controversial. The relatives of many people in such groups were concerned, and some NRMs have practice eccentric behavior, especially regarding sex, alternative medicine, and child raising. The research conducted for the book was done over a 10 year period. The book is supplemented and sourced with several interviews, as well as newspaper reports and expert testimony. Palmer interviewed the leader of one of the NRMs profiled in the book, Arnaud Mussy.

France's concept of secularism, called laïcité, has been noted to be very different from the North American conception of it; historian Joan Wallach Scott described the American version as being intended to protect religions from the government, and the French version as being intended to protect individuals from religion. While this was initially mainly aimed against the Catholic Church, later on it became more targeted at minority religions, such as Islam, or newly invented religions.

Following the Order of the Solar Temple case, in which members of a NRM committed ritual mass murder-suicide in several incidents in the 1990s, there was renewed support for state intervention against purported cults amongst politicians, the media and the populace. This resulted in several initiatives, including the creation of several inter-ministerial task forces designed to address cults, and the passage of the About–Picard law, which made "brainwashing" a criminal offense. In 1996, there was a report that officially listed 173 movements as cults, in some cases leading to the members facing increased outside pressure. Some French academics who study NRMs have faced defamation lawsuits and police investigations due to their research.

== Contents ==
In an introduction, Palmer declares her objective to be to provide an accurate account of the conflict, what Palmer calls the "French sect wars", and says that though she does not "expect my readers to care about whether Scientology or any other sect succeeds in its struggle for social legitimacy, surely the French public’s perception of, or attitude toward, Muslims, Protestants, Orthodox Jews, Buddhists and Sikhs does matter", viewing the conflict as reinforcing bias against all non-Catholic religion in France. She argues that members of NRMs are "heretics", "not of the Catholic Church, but of the laïcité". She uses the French term sectes without translating it as either "cult" or "sect".

The work is divided into three sections. The first focuses on the development and background of the anti-cult movement in France and its roots in the French Revolution, as well as the concept of laïcité. She follows many of the specific legal actions performed by the French state to fight cults, including the About–Picard law, the report of sectes, and the formation of the anti-cult organizations UNADFI and MIVILUDES. Both organizations did not respond to Palmer's request for interview. She points out the Solar Temple case as deeply influencing government and public opinion on these issues.

The second section is the longest, and contains six case studies of NRMs and how they were impacted by the "sect wars". Aumism, Church of Scientology, Raëlian movement, Tabitha's Place, Horus, and Néo-Phare. Néo-Phare was a small NRM that was the first invocation of the About–Picard anti-cult law. She argues that the invocation of the law to charge the group's leader with brainwashing was misplaced. Palmer criticizes what she calls mediabolization, or the involvement of the media in the fight against these groups. The third and final section covers Palmer's conclusions on the "sect wars". The book contains two indexes: first, the contents of a questionnaire that aimed to survey the effects of the "secte" label on the groups that had been listed in the Guyard Report, and another containing several interviews conducted in the course of the book's research.

== Reception ==
The New Heretics of France received largely positive reviews. George Adams writing for Nova Religio described it as a "thought-provoking work", and said that it would hopefully begin further study and discussion of the topic A review by John Warne Monroe of H-France Review praised the book as offering "much information unavailable elsewhere", saying the work "deserves serious attention". The publication Religion Watch said Palmer did an "interesting job" in tracing the conflict through case studies. Gearóid Barry writing for Religious Studies Review praised it as "significant, readable, and suitable for a wide audience", but described it as a "robust polemic", while Melchior Pelleterat de Borde writing for Sociology of Religion called the book "impressive" and "a remarkable achievement" in light of how difficult undertaking any "serious research" on the topic in France given the polarization of the topic. Choice Magazine's T. D. Lancaster gave a more negative review; overall he ranked it "optional". In The Journal of Religion, Melissa K. Byrnes praised the book as a "thorough study" of the topic matter and complimented its writing quality and presentation of its thesis. Christiane Königstedt, in her 2016 book Frankreich und seine "Sekten": Konfliktdynamiken zwischen Katholizismus, Laizismus und Religionsfreiheit (lit. 'France and its "Cults": Conflict Dynamics between Catholicism, Secularism and Religious Freedom'), called the research contained within the book and the data collection was valuable.

Some reviewers criticized the book's coverage of the historical context. Monroe noted what he called "methodological shortcomings", particularly in Part III. He said that while Palmer's "general observations" were sound, her contextualization of French history was "imprecise, and in a few cases inaccurate". He viewed the book as relying largely on "broad, impressionistic historical analyses" from sociologists, lacking works from historians that would have helped contextualize. As it was, he said this gave Palmer's conclusions "a vagueness" that weakened them, and that the way she portrayed anti-cult sentiment portrayed it as entirely irrational, instead of growing from a historical context specific to France. Barry also viewed the historical context as lacking compared to the coverage of state policy, noting several lines of inquiry that Palmer did not touch on. However, Lancaster argued the book was actually at its best in linking the overall French fight against cults to France's history with religion, as well as in noting France's lack of criteria in differentiating sectes from religions.

De Borde argued that the third section, while short, was the most interesting part by far, and complimented Palmer's attempt to "stand back" from her academic field in this section which she viewed as beneficial to the reader. However, she criticized the lack of context of France's legal system that led to the laws discussed in the book. Byrnes called the book's "principle weakness" Palmer's arguments about media persecution, saying this undercut her other arguments about the "sect war" and its relationship to cultural anxiety, as Palmer noted that the media was largely driven by a desire to sell interesting and entertaining stories, which her theory of persecution did not account for. She also doubted any portrayal of the French media as "a unified actor", arguing this did not account with the book's own mention of journalists who sided with NRMs. Régis Dericquebourg overall complimented the book as "exhaustive" and "easy to read", though said Palmer omitted some aspects of the anti-cult relationship with radical islamic sects; he argued that groups such as MIVILUDES ignored such groups and their recruitment. He praised it as being entirely centered on France, which he viewed as bringing these topics to the attention of the English speaking world.

Monroe argued that the methodological flaws did not much detract from the value of the work, noting the lack of other studies on NRMs in France, saying that "aside from [Palmer's] important 2004 monograph on the Raëlians and a precious few other books, non-biased sociological or ethnographic studies of individual heterodox religious groups in present-day France do not exist", with much French literature on the topic lacking "value-free" qualitative analysis and the field of NRM studies as a whole being discounted by French authorities. Barry called the work "topical" in 2013, given that year's ruling by European Court of Human Rights against France in their treatment of the Aumists. He praised the selection of cases studies in the book as well chosen, and called Palmer's case about France's intolerance of religion was strongly presented. Adams also praised Palmer's case studies as "in-depth" and her work as carefully assessing the topic matter, and said that the third section raised difficult questions on many aspects of the topic; de Borde called the case studies section the most "richly documented".

An overall opinionated tone was perceived by some reviewers; Lancaster derided what he called "unbalanced empirical work", calling Palmer too personally invested in the topic matter and criticizing the evidence she used. He also criticized the storytelling and editing. De Borde also said that Palmer's tone seemed at time to "verge on indictment", weakening the attempt to examine the issue in a well-rounded way and saying that a "more balanced" presentation may have been better, though said the book "effectively arraigns" French society. Occasional aspects of the evidence used were criticized by Byrnes; she argued that the book would have benefited if Palmer had more frequently acknowledged the limitations of her sourcing, pointing out her acknowledgement of such in the chapter on Néo-Phare, but described her depictions of their theology as neutral and comprehensive. Königstedt did not disagree with Palmer's sympathies but argued against Palmer's simplistic view of the state as an institution.
