= The Mystical Geography of Quebec =

2020 book about religion in Quebec

- Cover of the first edition
- Editor: Susan J. Palmer; Martin Geoffroy; Paul L. Gareau
- Language: English
- Series: Palgrave Studies in New Religions and Alternative Spiritualities
- Subject: Religion in Quebec
- Publisher: Palgrave Macmillan
- Publication date: 2020
- Publication place: Switzerland
- Pages: 274
- ISBN: 978-3-03033-061-3
- OCLC: 1144887345

The Mystical Geography of Quebec: Catholic Schisms and New Religious Movements is an edited volume edited by Susan J. Palmer, Martin Geoffroy, and Paul L. Gareau, discussing religious history and new religious movements in Quebec. The book covers nine groups, including the Temple of Priapus, the Army of Mary, the Order of the Solar Temple, and the Ant Hill Kids. It was published by Palgrave Macmillan in 2020.

It argues that the context of Quebec's history provides a particularly good environment for new religious movements, and specific chapters analyze the history of the individual group's in Quebec context. It received a generally positive reception, with praise for its contribution to the field and for bridging a barrier between French and English language scholarship.

== Background ==
The Susan J. Palmer is an academic and author of several books about new religious movements, while Martin Geoffroy and Paul L. Gareau are specialists in Catholic groups. Several of Palmer's students authored chapters in the book.

The Mystical Geography of Quebec was published by Palgrave Macmillan in 2020. It is part of Palgrave's Palgrave Studies in New Religions and Alternative Spiritualities series.

== Contents ==
The book contains contributions from writers Susan J. Palmer, Martin Geoffroy, Dominic Dagenais, Paul L. Gareau, Dell J. Rose, Steven Tomlins, J. Gordon Melton, Donald L. Boisvert, Marie-Ève Melanson, Shannon Clusel, and Andrew Ames. The book covers nine groups in 11 chapters. Following an introduction (written by Palmer) and a literature review, the book's contents are divided into three parts; "Catholic Fundamentalisms and Schisms", covering Catholic schisms and their intersection with the history of Quebec, "Radical Sexuality", and "Controversial New Religions", which covers several new religious movements that have spawned controversy in the province.

Essays in "Catholic Fundamentalisms and Schisms" cover the Army of Mary, the Pilgrims of Saint-Michael, the Mission of the Holy Spirit, while "Radical Sexuality" covers Henry Morgentaler and the Temple of Priapus, and "Controversial New Religions" includes essays on the Christian Essene Church, Apostles of Infinite Love, the Order of the Solar Temple, and the Ant Hill Kids.

The book's introduction argues that certain features of Quebec's history make it have a particularly "favorable ecology" for NRMs, including its status as an open and tolerant society and the vacuum opened by the decline of the Catholic Church in Canada, as well as the liberal immigration policies of the province.

== Reception ==
The Mystical Geography of Quebec received positive reviews. Adam Possamai praised the book as containing "rich material" on its subject matter, and highly recommended it to anyone looking to study religion in Quebec. He described it as "an important contribution to this field of research which will certainly be used as a point of reference for further studies." Hillary Kaell writing for Nova Religio described the book as "essential reading" for those wishing to learn about new religious movements in North America, additionally praising the book for its contextualization of Quebec-France relations. Bernadette Rigal-Cellard praised it for bridging a gap in scholarship between French and English speaking Canada, and described its analysis as "in-depth".

Kaell said Palmer's work in specific anchored the volume, and described the level of detail in specific chapters (singling out the chapter on the Order of the Solar Temple and the chapter on the Pilgrims of Saint-Michael) as "impressive", while Possamai said the book was "strong in developing the case for Quebec’s unique social and cultural position" and how this related to religious movements there.

Some minor criticisms were directed at various aspects of the book: Kaell criticized the chapter on Henry Morgentaler as being out of place in the volume, saying that though she understood inclusion of non-religious sections the chapter overall did not relate well to the book's classification, and that Morgentaler's status as the only non-Christian discussed in the book was not discussed. Possamai argued its lack of comparisons between other Catholic regions and Quebec was weaker than similar portions in the book. Kaell further described the inclusion of the Pilgrims of Saint-Michael as an "interesting choice" given that they were neither a schismatic or new religious movement.
