= Néo-Phare =

French new religious movement (2001–2002)

- Type: New religious movement
- Headquarters: Cellier, France
- Founder: Arnaud Mussy
- Origin: January 2001; France
- Separated from: Phare-Ouest
- Defunct: October 2002; 23 years ago
- Members: 21 (at peak)

Néo-Phare (lit. 'New Lighthouse') was a small French new religious movement, often described as a cult or doomsday cult, founded by Arnaud Mussy in January 2001. It formed through a schism with Phare-Ouest (lit. 'West Lighthouse'), which was founded by the esoteric writer André Bouguenec. Bouguenec's belief system incorporated Kabbalah and hermeticism, and he also proclaimed that he was God. Mussy joined the group in 1997, and Bouguenec died the same year. Viewing the original group as too rigid, Mussy and 20 members left the group and formed Néo-Phare.

After the September 11 attacks, Mussy predicted the end of the world, the time of which was repeatedly delayed after it failed to occur. In July 2002, a member killed himself and two other members were said to have attempted to kill themselves. Following this, Mussy was tried in France on the grounds that he had brainwashed his followers and was responsible for the suicide and attempted suicides. He was found guilty, and given a three-year suspended sentence and a €115,000 fine. The group was dissolved after Mussy was arrested; it only existed for a year and a half. It was the first time the anti-cult About–Picard law had been invoked, and the trial received a significant amount of media coverage.

== History ==
Arnaud Mussy was born in Boulogne-Billancourt in 1968. He moved to Argentina in his 20s, but then returned to France. When Mussy was 22, he discovered the esoteric beliefs of fashion designer Paco Rabanne. Mussy had worked for France-Telecom and had a BTS degree in communication. The Scotsman described him as a "former hitchhiker". In 1997, he met the obscure esoteric writer and Breton mystic and freemason André Bouguenec (also known as Auguste Bouguenec; last name also sometimes spelled Bougenec). Bouguenec led the Phare-Ouest (lit. 'West Lighthouse') group, which had about 40 members. Phare-Ouest had been founded in 1989; Bouguenec believed that he was the reincarnation of Jesus, and developed a belief system, Kabbalah Française, derivative of Kabbalah, which involved numerology and linguistic elements, inspired by alchemical hermeticism. Bouguenec's claim to be god was supposedly proven with numerology; however, using his actual name did not fulfill this proof. He believed God to be androgynous. He preached for a kind of salvation that involved sex-complementary pairs, with the couples in the group representing the couples of Heavenly Jerusalem. He held ceremonies that established married couples as these "soulmate" pairs. Mussy joined Phare-Ouest in 1997; that year, Bouguenec died.

After Bouguenec's death, Mussy formed a schismatic group, later saying that he considered the members of Phare-Ouest to be too religiously rigid "like the Pharisees", but the psychologist Sonya Jougla attributes this to both internal conflicts and his ambition. In January 2001, Mussy, with 20 followers, formed Néo-Phare; most members were between the ages of 30 and 40, and largely couples with some children. Mussy and his twin brother Olivier, who was viewed as Saint Peter within the group, brought their wives and their mother-in-law into the group. Neither brother needed to work as their father had left them a large inheritance. The name Néo-Phare was chosen after the protagonist of the 1999 film The Matrix, Neo, as Mussy was a fan of the movie, in combination with the previous group's title. He interpreted esoteric meaning from some of the film's symbolism.

The 21 members (including Mussy) were visualized as 21 "apostles" (flipped from the Twelve Apostles), their task being to rewrite the Bible, which they viewed as having been distorted by the Catholic Church. They analyzed it through Bouguenec's ideas and numerology system. The group's mission was to rebuild the world after the apocalypse in a way that would align with their beliefs. Mussy said he was the reincarnation of Jesus Christ (previously he believed he was James the Apostle). The group moved to two hamlets, with the core members living in Cellier, a small village close to Nantes, and the rest living in Olivier Mussy's home in Aigrefeuille. According to Olivier Mussy, the group lived cooperatively but not communally; members shared expenses and worked jobs half time, but maintained their own bank accounts. Early in the group's history, Mussy interpreted and taught Bouguenec's ideas, but he later began to fulfill a more messianic role.

== Apocalypse predictions ==
Néo-Phare has been classified as a doomsday cult by the suicide researcher Loren Coleman. The anti-cult group UNADFI described them as having both apocalyptic and UFO religion aspects. After the September 11 attacks, the group became more apocalyptic in its thought. Mussy claimed that Bouguenec had foreseen the destruction of the Twin Towers, and the group interpreted the attack as a sign of the end times. Mussy said that Bouguenec had encrypted the date as 11/6 instead of 9/11 (inverting the number), and said that the attacks were a message from God to prepare for the end. He announced that the end of the world would occur on 29 December 2001. He believed the apocalypse would be positive—not a violent destruction of the world, but a rebirth of a more spiritual humanity.

In December 2001, Néo-Phare convened in a crypt near the tomb of Mary Magdalene in Vézelay and attempted to communicate with her spirit, which they referred to as the "Divine Mother" and conceived of as the "female archetype". Mussy mimicked Jesus on the cross while another member shouted out the French word beaucoup (lit. transl. a lot, many). The group also engaged in trance sessions, similar to Pentecostal Christian practice. The group often met at sacred sites, such as abbeys and historic castles, viewing them as locations of power. Mussy viewed the tomb of Francis II, Duke of Brittany (which was discussed in a book written by Bouguenec) in Nantes as the key to the apocalypse.

When the apocalypse date of 29 December 2001 arrived, nothing happened. Mussy then announced that the apocalypse would be 25 February 2002. After the announcement, he exerted more control over Néo-Phare's members, separating 3 or 4 couples and reassigning them to others according to their "energies"—an extension of Bouguenec's soulmate doctrine. Mussy said he was reuniting couples through this practice, not separating them, with the couples in the group representing the couples in Heavenly Jerusalem and all of the couples in the world.

In February 2002, a Néo-Phare member claimed that she felt a presence in her throat and fell into a trance claiming to channel Bouguenec, who spoke to Mussy and told him he was Jesus. Although channeling was not then part of the group's doctrine, the group believed her. Less than a month later, that member and her boyfriend left the group and denounced Mussy as a cult leader and a fake, saying he was a "seducer" who could "overwhelm" people. In a deposition taken later, she stated that she had not done the channeling, but that Mussy had done it himself "directly, from the sky". In light of both the channeling and the ritual in the crypt in Vézelay, Mussy claimed to be Jesus.

The February date passed and there was once again no apocalypse. He announced a new date of 2 September, and then 24 October 2002 (the latter being the day of Bouguenec's death). At this time, the group had been noticed by the French authorities, who were concerned about the attitudes of the group. The relatives of some members, comparing the group to the Order of the Solar Temple (which had committed several mass suicides), were worried about its apocalyptic ideas and the behavior of the members. They contacted an anti-cult group, who contacted journalists, resulting in media attention on the group and mockery of its ideas. In March 2002, members were summoned to a police station and an investigation was launched after these complaints. The status of the group's children was investigated, but as their children were not involved in any of their activities and regularly attended school, the police were satisfied and the case was closed in June 2002. As a result of the police investigation, the group became embroiled in crisis and most members left, leaving only 8 core members.

== Suicide and alleged attempts ==
On 14 July 2002, one member of Néo-Phare, 29-year-old Jérémie Trossais, killed himself by throwing himself in front of a car. What lead Trossais to kill himself is unknown; he did not leave a suicide note. He had been viewed as a Judas figure within the group. Psychiatrist Jean-Marie Abgrall argued that this led to his abuse within the movement, but sociologist Susan J. Palmer argued that, as Judas was viewed positively within the group's theology, this may not have been stigmatizing. A member of Trossais's family said he had felt rejected by Mussy, who said he did not pray enough, and said that it was his fault the apocalypse had not happened on time. Trossais's wife had also been paired with Mussy's brother as his "soulmate" and she became pregnant. Shortly after his death, Trossais's wife left the group to live with her family.

In the following days, it was alleged that two other members, a couple, also attempted suicide, though they later denied this. The couple had been members of Phare-Ouest for seven years and joined Mussy's schism. On 15 July, the male member of the couple climbed up the tower of the Château de Clermont. He threw himself out of a window, but survived the fall, unharmed. The following day, his wife did the same, climbing up the tower. According to news reports, she did this naked with a flower in her mouth. She was then brought to a clinic in the castle, and taken for psychiatric examination. The couple were then questioned by police.

Mussy and his brother's version of events is that there had been a power struggle, saying that in July 2002, the couple attempted to take over Néo-Phare. According to him they told Mussy that they had received a revelation that if he went to Nantes, he would meet his "soul sister". As Mussy's wife had recently left him and he felt lonely, he went. During his absence both members of the couple then declared themselves the leaders of the group. When Mussy returned, there was a power struggle between Mussy and the couple. Mussy interpreted this coup as reinforcing his claim of being the messiah and viewed the couple as "rebel angels", symbolic of the revolt against God. Mussy claimed that on the day he had killed himself, Trossais had repeatedly called him on the phone and sounded distraught over the couple; Mussy told him to come over so they could discuss it, but Trossais refused. According to Mussy, in a second call, Trossais also claimed to be Jesus, and said that he believed that if he died, God would manifest. Mussy did not take this seriously and believed it to be a metaphor, as he, also believing himself to be Jesus, had not tried to kill himself. The attempted suicide of the couple was claimed by Olivier Mussy as an attempt by the couple to display supernatural powers, as they had allegedly told him and his brother that they were "the two faces of God".

Immediately after the suicide of Trossais, police questioned Néo-Phare members. Charges were not immediately brought, as there was no proof of crimes such as financial misappropriation or involvement of minors in the organization. The group then moved back to Nantes, where they waited for the apocalypse. Mussy and the remaining five members shut themselves in a house, awaiting the "journey to Venus". Here they were monitored by French intelligence services. When they stayed inside the house for a long period, the police began to worry they were plotting mass suicide like the Order of the Solar Temple. During this period they read about and discussed religious matters. Former members claimed that they were waiting for UFOs. The members stored food in preparation for the apocalypse. Mussy claimed there would be three "difficult" days of the end of the world, but then it would be "joyful"; however, later he said that it would not be an end of "the" world, but the end of "a" world.

Mussy denied responsibility for the previous suicide and suicide attempts, and denied that his group would kill themselves, saying that death was not the way out and that Néo-Phare was not a cult. No documents were ever found indicating the group advocated or encouraged suicide. By September, there had begun a media frenzy around the case; news reports suggested that the group may have been intending to commit mass suicide. Néo-Phare was frequently compared to the Solar Temple by the media, with Le Figaro declaring it the "new OTS" and journalists comparing Mussy to leaders Luc Jouret and Joseph Di Mambro. A former member discussed a comparison between the group's idea of voyaging to Venus and the Solar Temple's concept of voyage to Sirius. On 5 September, Mussy dismissed any comparisons made between the two groups. After the deaths, the investigation into the group was reopened. At that time Mussy then stated the apocalypse date was not specific but would happen before Christmas. He said that if he was incorrect about doomsday he might return to his prior job working at France-Telecom.

== Trial and dissolution ==
Mussy was arrested 16 October 2002 and charged for "abuse of weakness" under the About–Picard law. He was held for 48 hours for questioning and forbidden by the court from having any contact with his followers. Néo-Phare was then dissolved; it had only existed for a year and a half. Mussy was released under judicial supervision. His trial received significant media coverage.

Mussy's trial was the test case for the About–Picard law. The law had been passed in May 2001 and was designed to prosecute cult leaders. It created a new misdemeanor in French law, abuse of weakness (l'abus frauduleux de l'état d’ignorance ou de faiblesse), that was designed to account for the several ways that a charismatic leader could harm a follower through brainwashing. However, the law faced criticism for lacking objective criteria. The law also allowed private groups (ones that were deemed to be "of public utility" and had existed for at least five years) to initiate civil proceedings on behalf of a civil plaintiff, without that plaintiff's consent or knowledge, including in some cases where the plaintiffs in question do not want charges filed.

Under that provision, the French anti-cult group UNADFI prosecuted the case against Mussy on behalf of Trossais's parents, naming Trossais, Trossais's widow (an ex-member), and the couple as victims; none of the living victims appeared at trial. The prosecution, led by the UNADFI attorney Jean-Michel Pesenti, called the psychiatrist Jean-Marie Abgrall, the lead French cult brainwashing expert, as an expert witness. A local official for an anti-cult group also gave evidence. Mussy was defended by a court-appointed attorney, Fabrice Petit. Mussy only met with his attorney twice, as he felt it more important to write a book. He told journalists at the trial that he had decided not to retain a lawyer because he was being "tested by the heavens". Throughout the trial, he used his presence to broadcast his message. He also maintained that he was Jesus.

The prosecution accused Mussy of causing Trossais's suicide by pressuring him and through "techniques of thought reform" that affected his judgment. Mussy's attorney argued that he was being used as a "guinea pig" to test the new law; he told the court that "One is asking you to be psychiatric magistrates. Neither you nor I have the competence to judge manipulation mentale [lit. transl. brainwashing]." Abgrall called Mussy "a master manipulator". He also compared the group to the Solar Temple, as both groups recorded their meetings and practiced swinging. Mussy's attorney argued that the group's members were responsible adults, capable of free choice. Trossais's sister said during the trial that Mussy had destroyed her brother, as he had the couple.

Mussy testified and argued that Néo-Phare was too poor, small, and careful to be a cult; the local cult official responded that that made the group even more dangerous because members would not realize they were joining a cult. Mussy further denied any involvement in Trossais's death or that he had planned any suicide. After Mussy testified, the judge said he seemed sincere; the local anti-cult official responded that his seeming sincere was further proof that he was a manipulator. The couple gave a deposition, read out by the prosecutor in court, in which they denied having attempted suicide. They further said that Mussy had never attempted to influence them to do things they did not want to do. The prosecutor argued that the deposition showed that they were brainwashed victims in a psychologically impressionable mental state, and Abgrall said they suffered from Stockholm syndrome.

On 14 October 2004, Mussy was found guilty of abuse of weakness. The public prosecutor requested a 30-month suspended sentence, with 6 months to be served, as well as that Mussy be banned from leading any group and that he undergo a 5-year socio-educational follow-up. The judgement was adjourned until 25 November. The Rennes Court of Appeal declined to follow the prosecution's recommendation, sentencing Mussy to a three-year suspended prison sentence and a €115,000 fine to compensate the victims. Mussy appealed the sentence, but it was upheld 6 June 2005.

== Aftermath ==
The verdict was celebrated by anti-cultists; National Assembly member Jean-Pierre Brard declared that it was "excellent news", while the prosecutor stated that "nothing will ever be the same", calling Mussy's conviction a "victory". The case was interpreted as a warning and a precedent: Mussy's attorney declared, following the verdict, that "This is not a conviction that is neutral. It contains a very strong warning! Here we have the first jurisprudence!" The state anti-cult agency MIVILUDES said it was excellent news, and praised the effectiveness of the law. The prosecutor said afterwards that the case had been a close call because of the difficulty in determining guilt of brainwashing. As of 2008, Mussy was paying the fine in installments. Mussy later said of his conviction that "It was clear the National Assembly had a new law and they wanted to try it out on some little group to make an example—not a big powerful [cult] like Scientology that has lots of money to defend itself. I have no money. I knew I could not win."

The cult researcher Susan J. Palmer argued that the application of the brainwashing concept in this specific case was flawed, even apart from the wider concerns about the legitimacy of the concept and how it is supposed to be proven. She also argued that Néo-Phare did not fit the typical cult mass suicide model (like the Solar Temple, Jonestown, and Heaven's Gate), and criticized what she believed was inadequate research of the group itself during the legal process, including its theology and history. She said it may have been an attempt by the French justice system to compensate for the innocent verdict in the Tabachnik trial of the Order of the Solar Temple. The OTS suicides had shocked the French public, and due to the failure of the justice system to convict the only person who ever went on trial in that case, there was no "satisfying" conclusion, deeply frustrating the French authorities. She also argued that the very high defection rate (14 of the 20 members had left over time) evidenced Mussy was not "a particularly effective brainwasher".

Suicide researcher Loren Coleman viewed it as "another scare" relating to mass suicide in the aftermath of the Solar Temple case, noting it as such alongside another group led by Heide Fittkau-Garthe that had been accused of the same in 1998. Psychologist Sonya Jougla argued that after the failure of his first apocalypse prediction, the failure became intolerable for Mussy as it showed tangibly that he had failed. She argued that he then reversed this meaning which avoided a loss of power for him and the group's beliefs. She also said that the group's continued membership after the suicide and police investigations was an example of résilience sectaire (lit. 'sectarian resilience') a kind of "pseudo resilience", to handle stress from the group membership, with Mussy viewing this ability as a sign of one's spiritual evolution.
