= Fittkau =

Fittkau or Fitkau is a surname. Notable people with the surname include:

- Agnieszka Perepeczko born Agnieszka Fitkau, Polish actress
- Ernst Josef Fittkau (1927-2012), German entomologist
- Heide Fittkau-Garthe, German psychologist
- Ludger Fittkau
