= Teide National Park =

National park in Tenerife, Spain

- IUCN category II (national park)
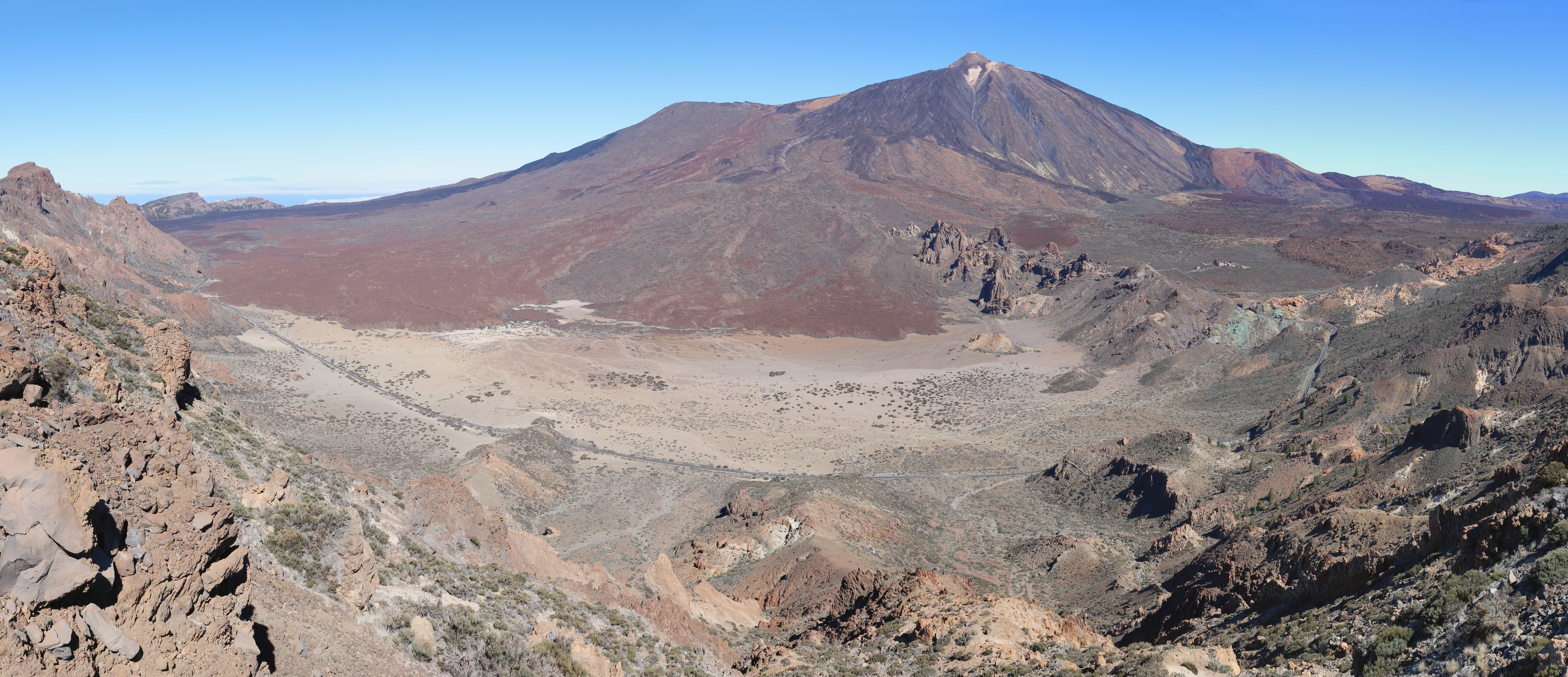
- Mount Teide, Pico Viejo, Roques de García

- Location within Tenerife Location within Spain, Canary Islands
- Location of Teide
- Location: Tenerife, Spain
- Coordinates: 28°15′47″N 16°36′58″W
- Area: 189.9 km^{2} (73.3 sq mi)
- Established: 1954
- Visitors: 4 million visits yearly

UNESCO World Heritage Site
- Type: Natural
- Criteria: vii, viii
- Designated: 2007 (31st session)
- Reference no.: 1258
- Region: Europe and North America

Teide National Park in 3D

Teide National Park (Spanish: Parque nacional del Teide, pronounced [ˈpaɾke naθjoˈnal del ˈtejðe]) is a national park located in Tenerife, Canary Islands, Spain.

The national park is centered on Mount Teide, the highest mountain of Spain (3,718 meters high) in addition, the highest volcano in the Atlantic Ocean islands and the third highest volcano in the world from its base in the ocean floor (7.500 meters high). Pico Viejo, also included within the national park limits, is the second highest volcano in the Canary Islands with its 3,135 m peak. Mount Teide and Pico Viejo are the only two peaks in the Canary islands rising above the 3,000 m level.

The park has an area of 18,990 hectares located in the municipality of La Orotava. It was named a World Heritage Site by UNESCO on June 28, 2007. Since the end of 2007, it has also been one of the 12 Treasures of Spain. On a ridge, to the east of Teide, are the telescopes of the Observatorio del Teide.

Teide is the most-visited national park in Spain. with some 3 million visitors yearly. In 2016, Teide received 4,079,823 visitors, reaching a historical record. In 2023, Teide saw 4,463,281 visitors, being one of the most visited national parks in the world.

There are morning and afternoon coach trips through the park, departing from selected areas in the south of Tenerife's tourist towns. Access to the peak requires a free permit that needs to be booked in advance.

== History ==
Teide National Park held spiritual significance to aboriginal Guanches, and important archaeological sites have been discovered in the park. Teide was a place of worship for the Guanches, who believed it was the gate to hell (Echeyde).

National park status was declared on January 22, 1954. In 1989, the Council of Europe awarded the European Diploma of Protected Areas, its highest category. This recognition and conservation management has been subsequently renewed in 1994, 1999 and 2004. In 2007, UNESCO declared Teide National Park a World Heritage Site. At the end of 2007, participants in the 12 Treasures of Spain project voted to include Teide National Park as the sixth treasure of Spain.

Teide National Park is complementary to the Hawaiʻi Volcanoes National Park, this is mainly due to being in each of them represented the volcanic structures and forms less evolved magmas of such islands (Hawaii) and more evolved and differentiated (Teide). Moreover, Teide National Park shares similar scenic characteristics with the Grand Canyon National Park in Arizona, United States.

== Geography and climate ==
The Teide National Park has generally a very sunny, dry and mild climate. The major climates found in the Teide National Park are the Mediterranean climate (Csa/Csb) and the Semi-arid climate (BSk).

The Izaña Teide Observatory located at 2,371 metres (7,779 ft) asl registers an annual temperature of 10.2 °C (50.4 °F) and almost 3,500 sunshine hours annually. Most summer days have completely clear skies.

Climate data for Izaña Observatory (1991–2020 normals) (altitude: 2,371 metres (7,779 ft)), extremes since 1919
Month	Jan	Feb	Mar	Apr	May	Jun	Jul	Aug	Sep	Oct	Nov	Dec	Year
Record high °C (°F)	18.3 (64.9)	21.8 (71.2)	22.0 (71.6)	23.0 (73.4)	26.0 (78.8)	27.7 (81.9)	30.4 (86.7)	29.6 (85.3)	27.2 (81.0)	24.6 (76.3)	20.8 (69.4)	21.9 (71.4)	30.4 (86.7)
Mean daily maximum °C (°F)	8.0 (46.4)	8.1 (46.6)	10.3 (50.5)	12.3 (54.1)	15.0 (59.0)	19.1 (66.4)	23.0 (73.4)	22.7 (72.9)	18.6 (65.5)	14.6 (58.3)	10.9 (51.6)	9.1 (48.4)	14.5 (58.1)
Daily mean °C (°F)	4.8 (40.6)	4.7 (40.5)	6.5 (43.7)	8.2 (46.8)	10.8 (51.4)	14.7 (58.5)	18.6 (65.5)	18.5 (65.3)	14.7 (58.5)	11.0 (51.8)	7.7 (45.9)	5.9 (42.6)	10.7 (51.3)
Mean daily minimum °C (°F)	1.6 (34.9)	1.3 (34.3)	2.8 (37.0)	4.0 (39.2)	6.5 (43.7)	10.3 (50.5)	14.2 (57.6)	14.2 (57.6)	10.7 (51.3)	7.4 (45.3)	4.5 (40.1)	2.8 (37.0)	6.8 (44.2)
Record low °C (°F)	−8.0 (17.6)	−9.8 (14.4)	−9.1 (15.6)	−8.2 (17.2)	−5.1 (22.8)	−1.4 (29.5)	−0.2 (31.6)	1.2 (34.2)	0.0 (32.0)	−3.0 (26.6)	−4.0 (24.8)	−6.8 (19.8)	−9.8 (14.4)
Average precipitation mm (inches)	61.3 (2.41)	58.8 (2.31)	56.7 (2.23)	23.9 (0.94)	5.6 (0.22)	0.7 (0.03)	0.1 (0.00)	7.2 (0.28)	8.3 (0.33)	43.6 (1.72)	59.0 (2.32)	67.9 (2.67)	393.1 (15.46)
Average precipitation days (≥ 1.0 mm)	5.5	4.6	5.1	3.1	1.0	0.1	0.0	0.7	1.5	4.7	5.1	6.6	38
Mean monthly sunshine hours	249	241	303	320	376	395	397	368	314	271	231	233	3,698
Source: Météo Climat

Climate data for Izaña Observatory (altitude: 2,371 metres (7,779 ft))
Month	Jan	Feb	Mar	Apr	May	Jun	Jul	Aug	Sep	Oct	Nov	Dec	Year
Record high °C (°F)	18.3 (64.9)	19.9 (67.8)	22.0 (71.6)	23.0 (73.4)	26.0 (78.8)	27.7 (81.9)	30.4 (86.7)	29.6 (85.3)	27.2 (81.0)	23.0 (73.4)	20.8 (69.4)	20.1 (68.2)	30.4 (86.7)
Mean daily maximum °C (°F)	7.5 (45.5)	8.0 (46.4)	10.2 (50.4)	11.8 (53.2)	14.5 (58.1)	18.9 (66.0)	23.0 (73.4)	22.6 (72.7)	18.6 (65.5)	14.3 (57.7)	11.1 (52.0)	8.8 (47.8)	14.1 (57.4)
Daily mean °C (°F)	4.3 (39.7)	4.7 (40.5)	6.4 (43.5)	7.6 (45.7)	10.1 (50.2)	14.4 (57.9)	18.5 (65.3)	18.2 (64.8)	14.5 (58.1)	10.6 (51.1)	7.8 (46.0)	5.6 (42.1)	10.2 (50.4)
Mean daily minimum °C (°F)	1.1 (34.0)	1.3 (34.3)	2.7 (36.9)	3.5 (38.3)	5.8 (42.4)	9.9 (49.8)	14.0 (57.2)	13.8 (56.8)	10.4 (50.7)	6.9 (44.4)	4.5 (40.1)	2.4 (36.3)	6.4 (43.5)
Record low °C (°F)	−8.0 (17.6)	−9.8 (14.4)	−9.1 (15.6)	−8.2 (17.2)	−5.1 (22.8)	−1.4 (29.5)	−0.2 (31.6)	1.2 (34.2)	0.0 (32.0)	−3.0 (26.6)	−4.0 (24.8)	−6.8 (19.8)	−9.8 (14.4)
Average precipitation mm (inches)	47 (1.9)	67 (2.6)	58 (2.3)	18 (0.7)	7 (0.3)	1 (0.0)	0 (0)	5 (0.2)	13 (0.5)	37 (1.5)	54 (2.1)	60 (2.4)	367 (14.5)
Average precipitation days (≥ 1.0 mm)	5	4	4	3	1	0	0	1	2	4	4	6	34
Average relative humidity (%)	50	54	48	45	40	32	25	30	43	55	54	52	44
Mean monthly sunshine hours	226	223	260	294	356	382	382	358	295	259	220	218	3,473
Source: 1981-2010 averages and 1920-2021 extremes. Agencia Estatal de Meteorología

== Flora and fauna ==
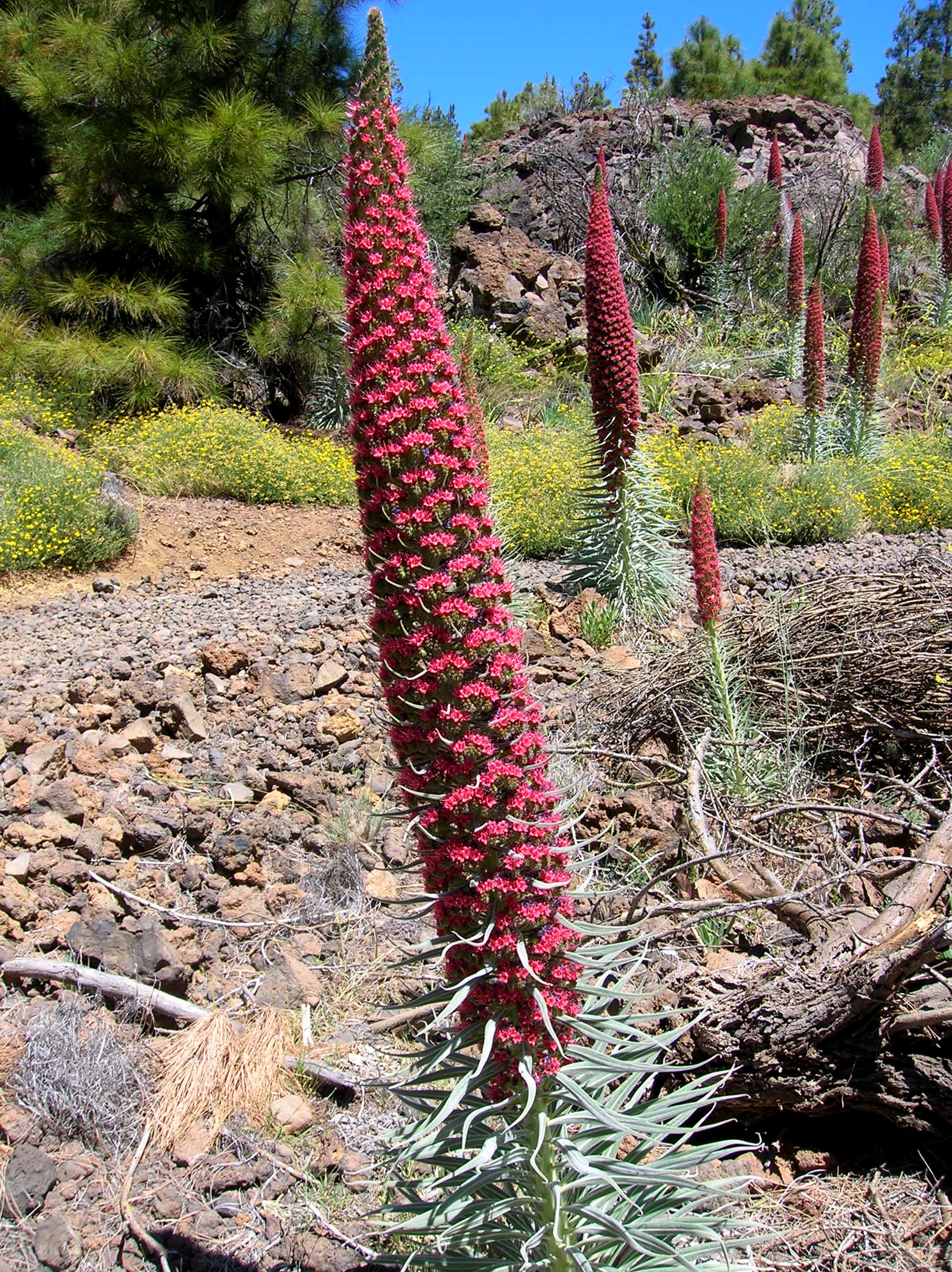
Echium wildpretii on Tenerife

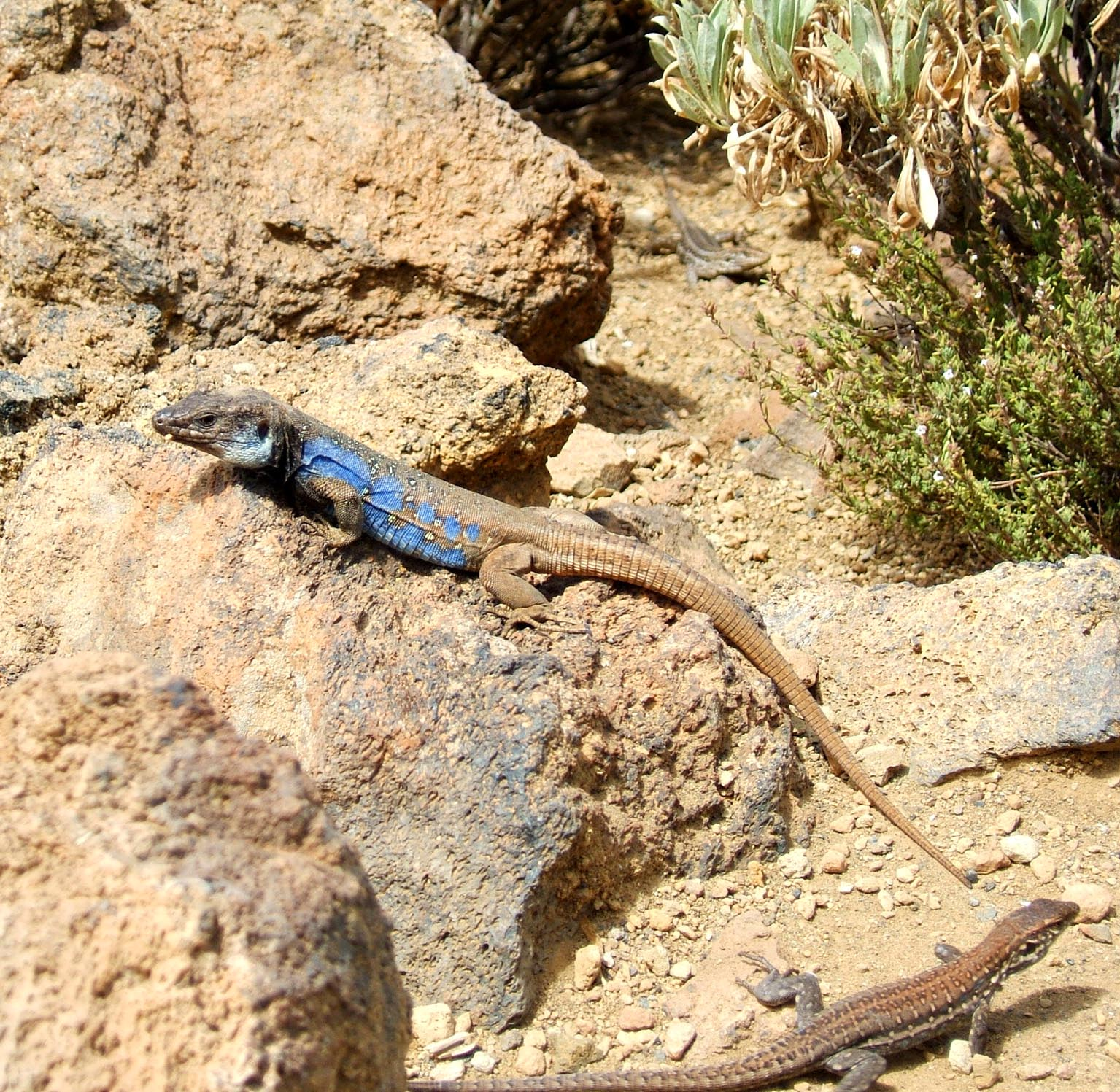
Southern Tenerife lizard (Gallotia galloti galloti)

The lava flows on the flanks of Teide weather to a very thin, but nutrient and mineral rich soil that supports a diverse number of plant species. Vascular flora consists of 168 plant species, 33 of which are endemic to Tenerife.

Forests of Canary Island pine (Pinus canariensis) occur from 1000 to 2100 m, covering the middle slopes of the volcano, and having an alpine timberline 1000 m lower than that of continental mountains of similar latitude. At higher altitudes, the Las Cañadas caldera provides sufficient shelter for more fragile species such as the Canary Island cedar (Juniperus cedrus), and the Canary Island pine (Pinus canariensis) to grow.

The most dominant plant species in the Teide National Park are the Teide white broom (Cytisus supranubius), which has a white and pink flower; the Canary Island wallflower (Erysimum scoparium), which has white and violet flowers; and the Teide bugloss (Echium wildpretii), whose red flowers form a pyramid up to 3m in height. The Teide daisy (Argyranthemum teneriffae) can be found at altitudes close to 3,600m above sea level. The Teide violet (Viola cheiranthifolia) can be found right up to the summit of the volcano, making it the highest flowering plant in Spain.

These plants are adapted to the tough environmental conditions on the volcano such as high altitude, intense sunlight, extreme temperature variations, and lack of moisture. Adaptations include acquiring semi-spherical forms, acquiring a downy or waxy cover, reducing the exposed leaf area, and having a high flower production. Flowering takes place in the late spring or early summer, in the months of May and June.

The Teide National Park contains a huge range of invertebrate fauna, over 40% of which are endemic species, with 70 species only being found in the national park. The invertebrate fauna include spiders, beetles, dipterans, hemipterans, and hymenopterae.

In contrast, Teide national park has only a limited variety of vertebrate fauna. Ten species of bird nest in the park. These include the blue chaffinch (Fringilla teydea teydea); Berthelot's pipit (Anthus berthelotii berthelotii); the Atlantic canary (Serinus canaria); and a subspecies of kestrel (Falco tinnunculus canariensis).

Three endemic reptile species are also found in the park – the Canary Island lizard (Gallotia galloti galloti), the Canary Island wall gecko (Tarentola delalandii), and the Canary Island skink (Chalcides viridanus viridanus).

The only mammals native to the park are bats, the most common species of which is Leisler's bat (Nyctalus leisleri). Other mammals such as the mouflon, the rabbit, the house mouse, the black rat, the feral cat, and the Algerian hedgehog have all been introduced to the park.

== Scientific landmark ==
The similarity between environmental and geological conditions of Teide National Park and the planet Mars have made the park the ideal place for testing instruments that will travel to Mars and reveal past or present life on Mars. In 2010 a research team tested at Las Cañadas del Teide the Raman instrument that was to be used in the ESA-NASA ExoMars expedition to Mars.

In 2017, ESA tested planetary rovers in an area of the park known as Las Minas de San José.

== Sister parks ==
- Rapa Nui National Park (Easter Island, Chile).

Besides the Teide National Park participates in different international programs and exchange advice with other national parks in the world, especially Central America, South America and Europe. In regard to international cooperation, the Teide National Park has provided technical support to the Souss-Massa National Park located in southwestern of Morocco.

== In popular culture ==
- This dramatic scenery has been featured in films such as One Million Years B.C. (1966), Intacto (2002), Clash of the Titans (2010) and Wrath of the Titans (2012).
- Mike Oldfield included in his compilation The Complete Mike Oldfield of 1985, a live recording of a song called Mount Teide dedicated to this famous volcano.
- The park has a small chapel dedicated to the Virgen de las Nieves which is the highest Christian church in Spain.
- Tenerife was the place where L. Ron Hubbard (founder of the Church of Scientology) called picked "OT-III materials", according to this doctrine one of the volcanoes which were cast the "thetans" 75 million years ago is the Teide together with other volcanoes in the world, mainly from Hawaii.
- On 24 June 1989 the radio program Espacio en Blanco of Radiocadena Española called a "UFO Alert" in the Teide National Park in order to achieve some kind of contact with extraterrestrials. This event was attended by about forty thousand people.
- On January 8, 1998, members of a cult led by German psychologist Heide Fittkau-Garthe were arrested, when they tried to perform a ritual suicide on Teide.
- The sixth installment of Fast & Furious starring Vin Diesel, and directed by Justin Lin, The Teide had the main stage for most of its outer planes.
- The Teide National Park has become a popular training ground for top professional cyclists, as it allows them to train at altitude whilst also having access to sea-level terrain for high-intensity training, in stable weather conditions, with few distractions due to its isolated location. Teams who have used the park for training include Team Sky, Liquigas and Team Astana.
- In 2018, the surroundings of the National Park hosted part of the filming of the American film Rambo: Last Blood, starring Sylvester Stallone and Paz Vega among others.
- The episode Land of Giants, part of the Chased by Dinosaurs series, a special from Walking with Dinosaurs, was filmed in the park.

== Gallery ==
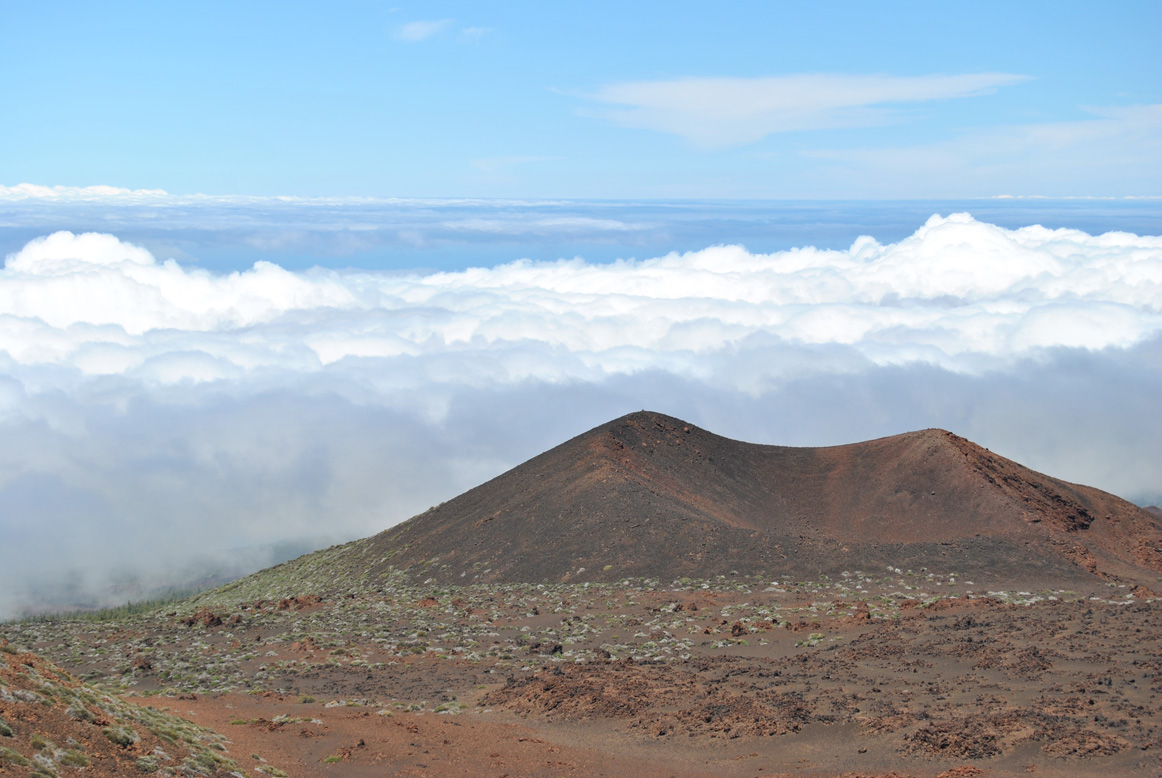
Teide National Park

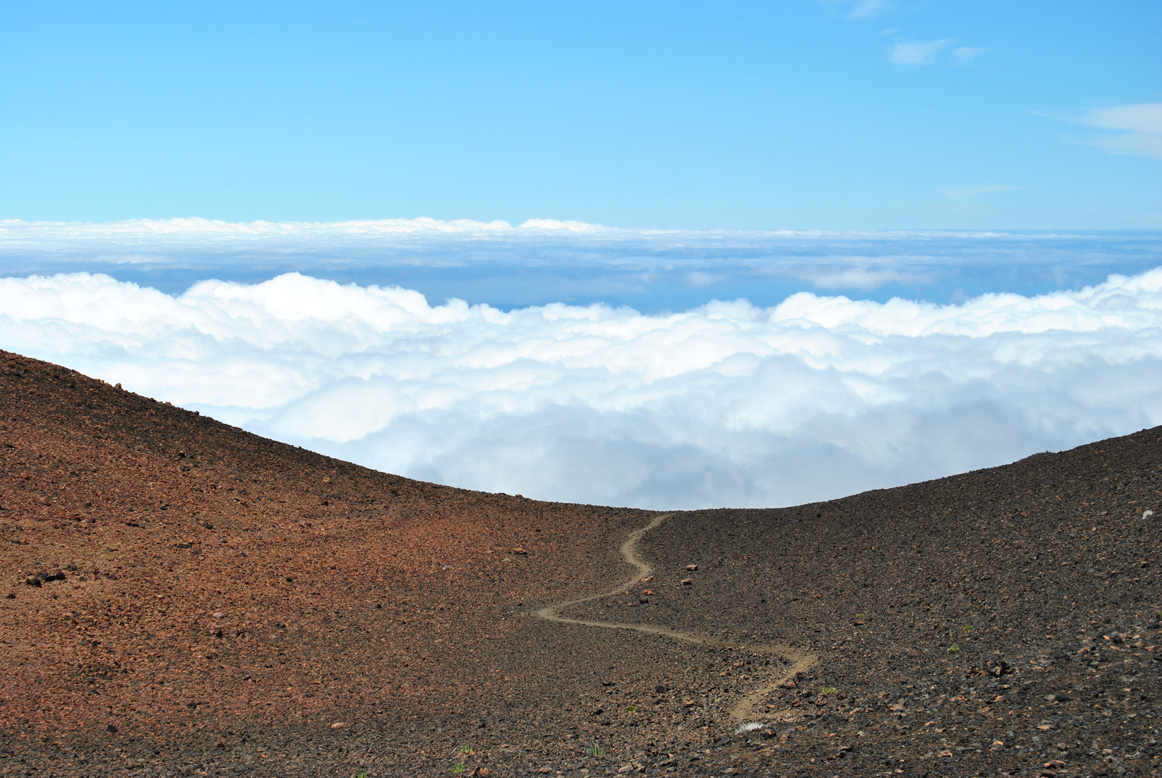
Teide National Park

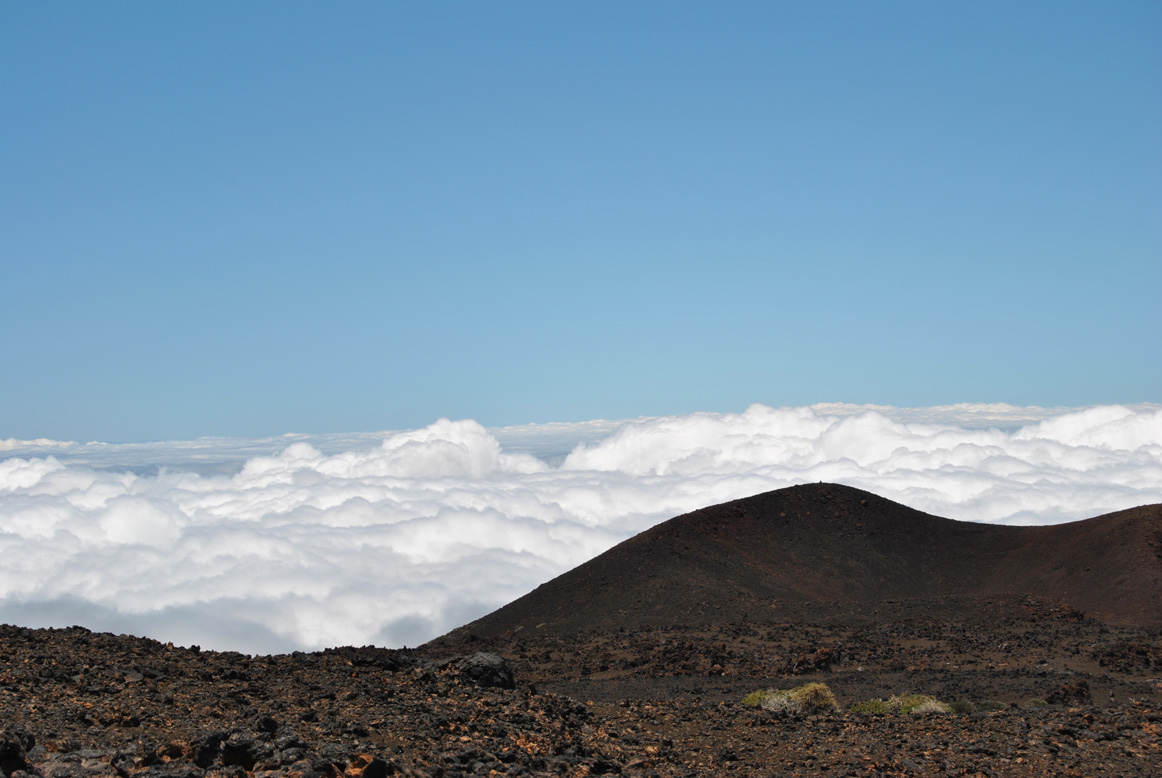
Teide National Park

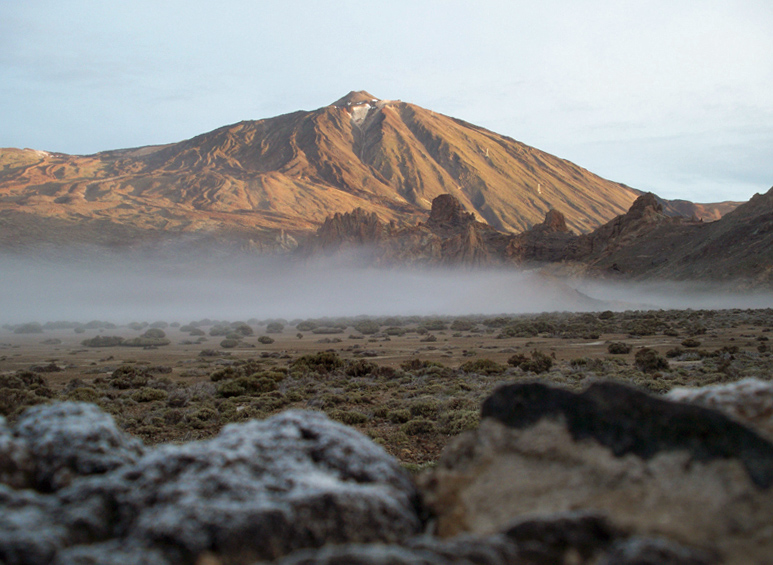
Llano de Ucanca

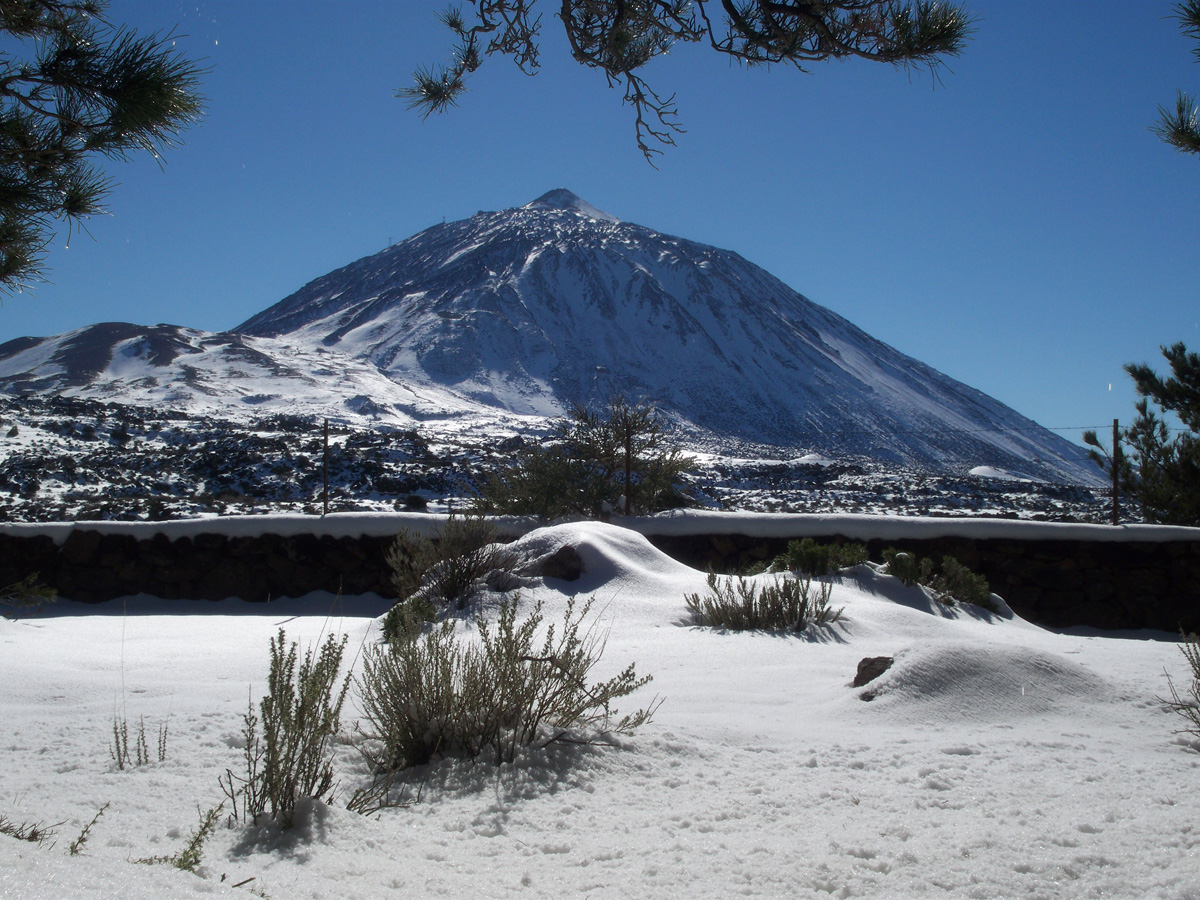
Teide National Park in winter

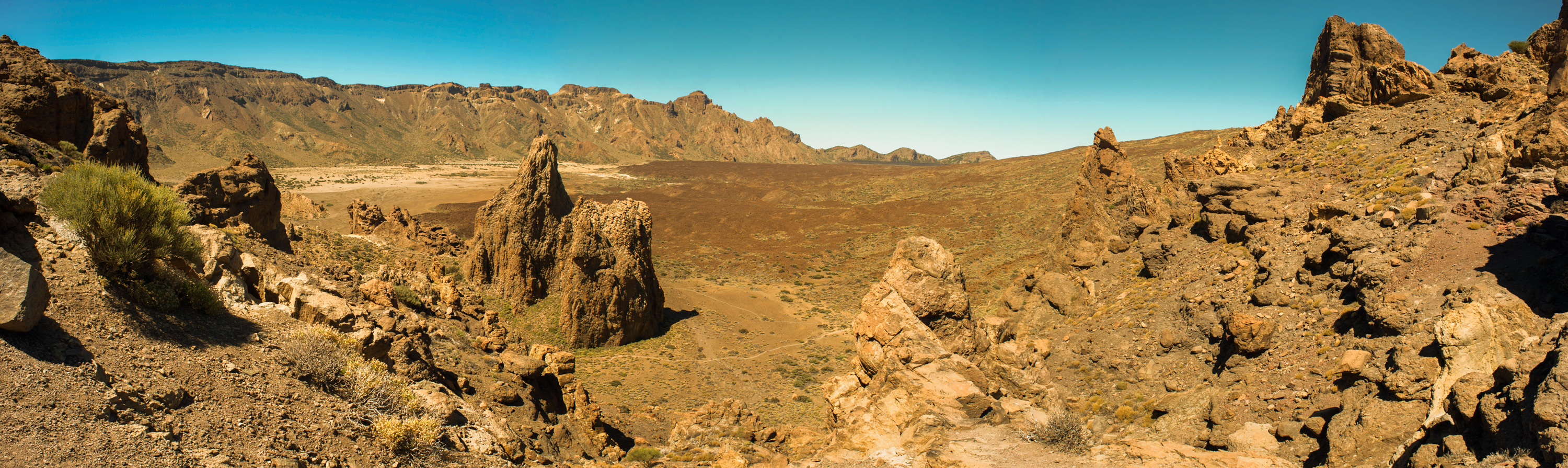
Panoramic view

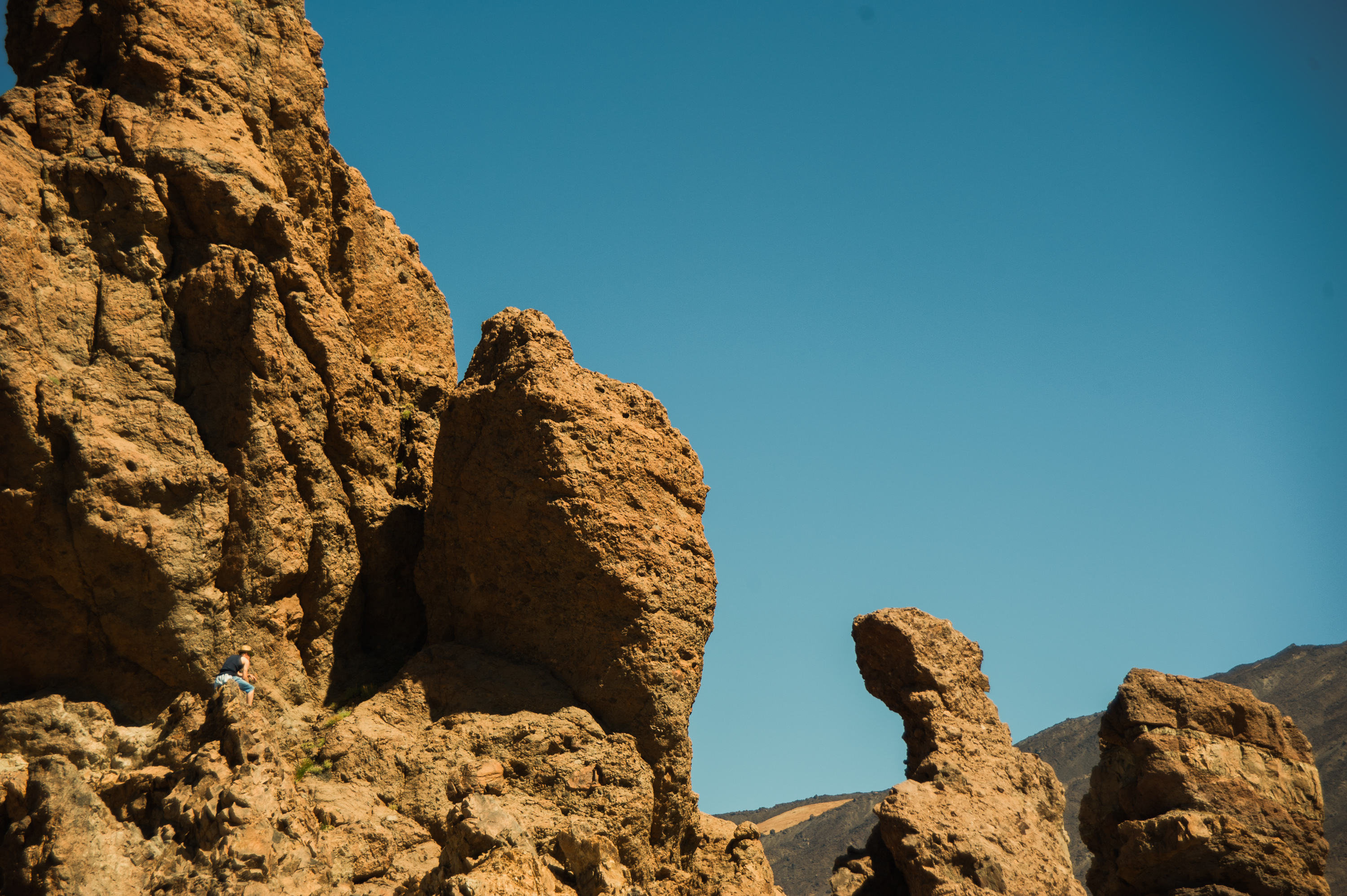
Rock formations

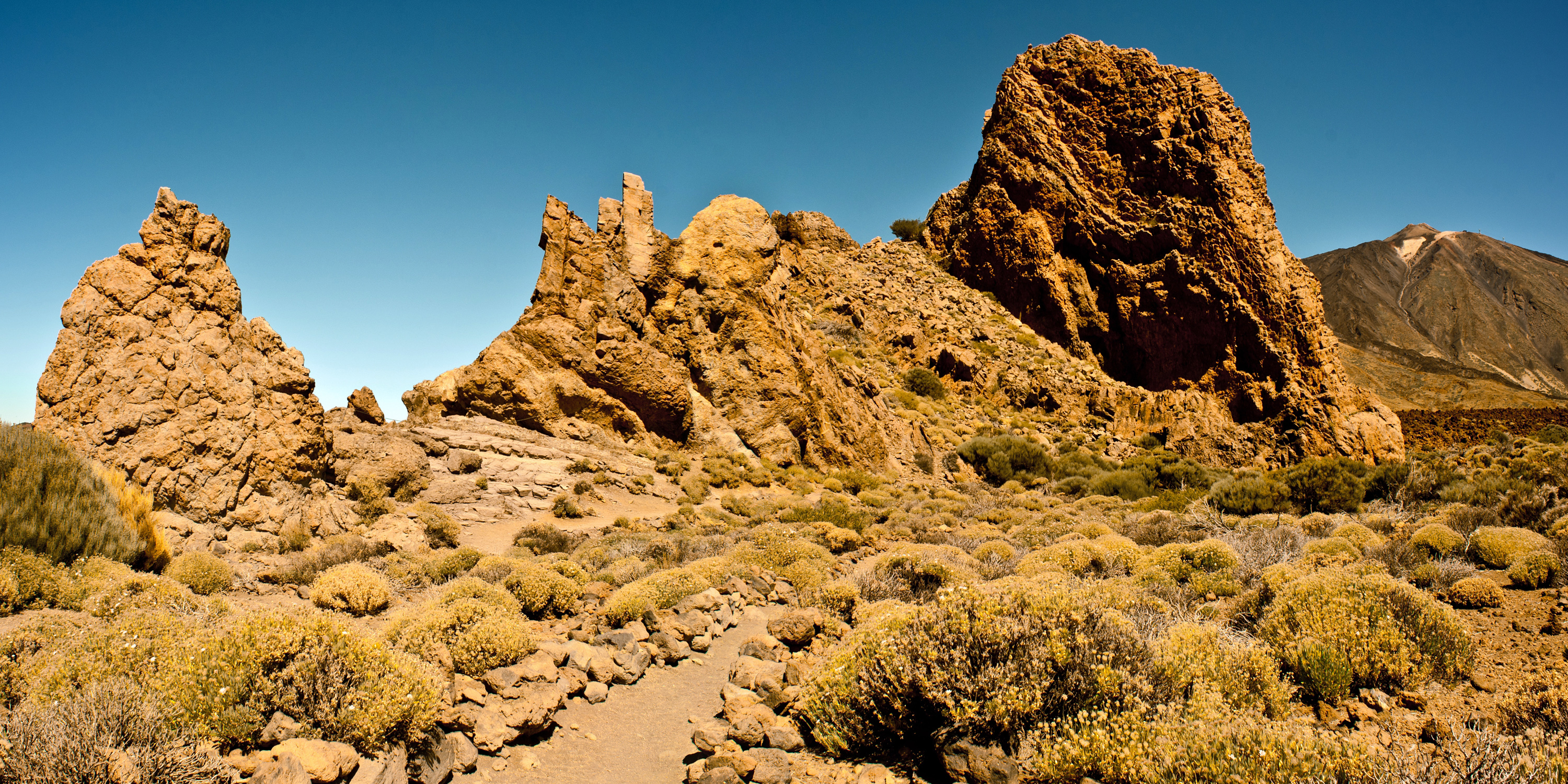
Rock formations

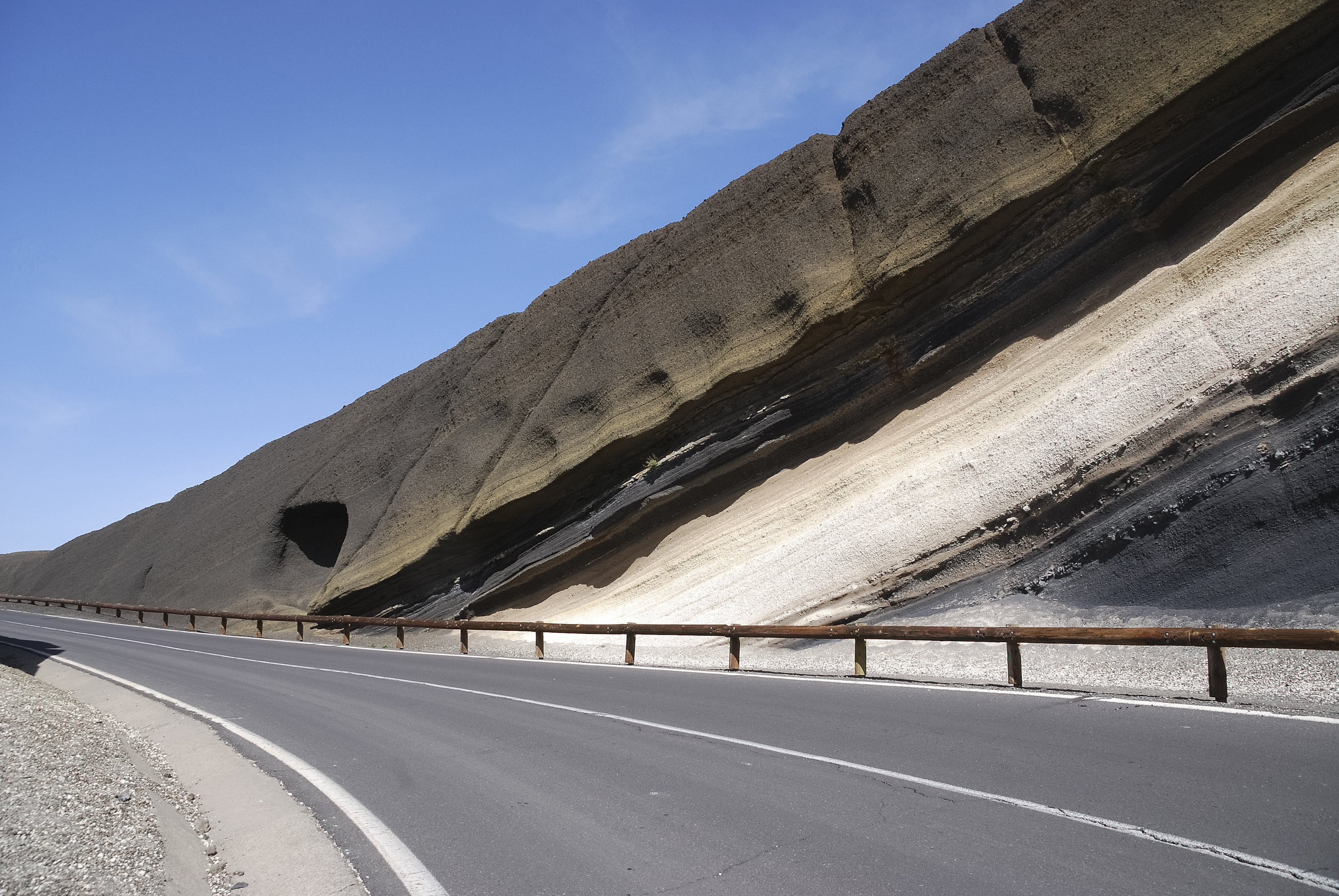
La Tarta del Teide (Teide Cake)

== See also ==
- Mount Teide
- Roque Cinchado
- Pico Viejo
- Teide Observatory
- Tenerife
- 12 Treasures of Spain
