= Maspalomas Dunes =

Nature reserve in Spain

Coordinates: 27.741°N 15.582°W

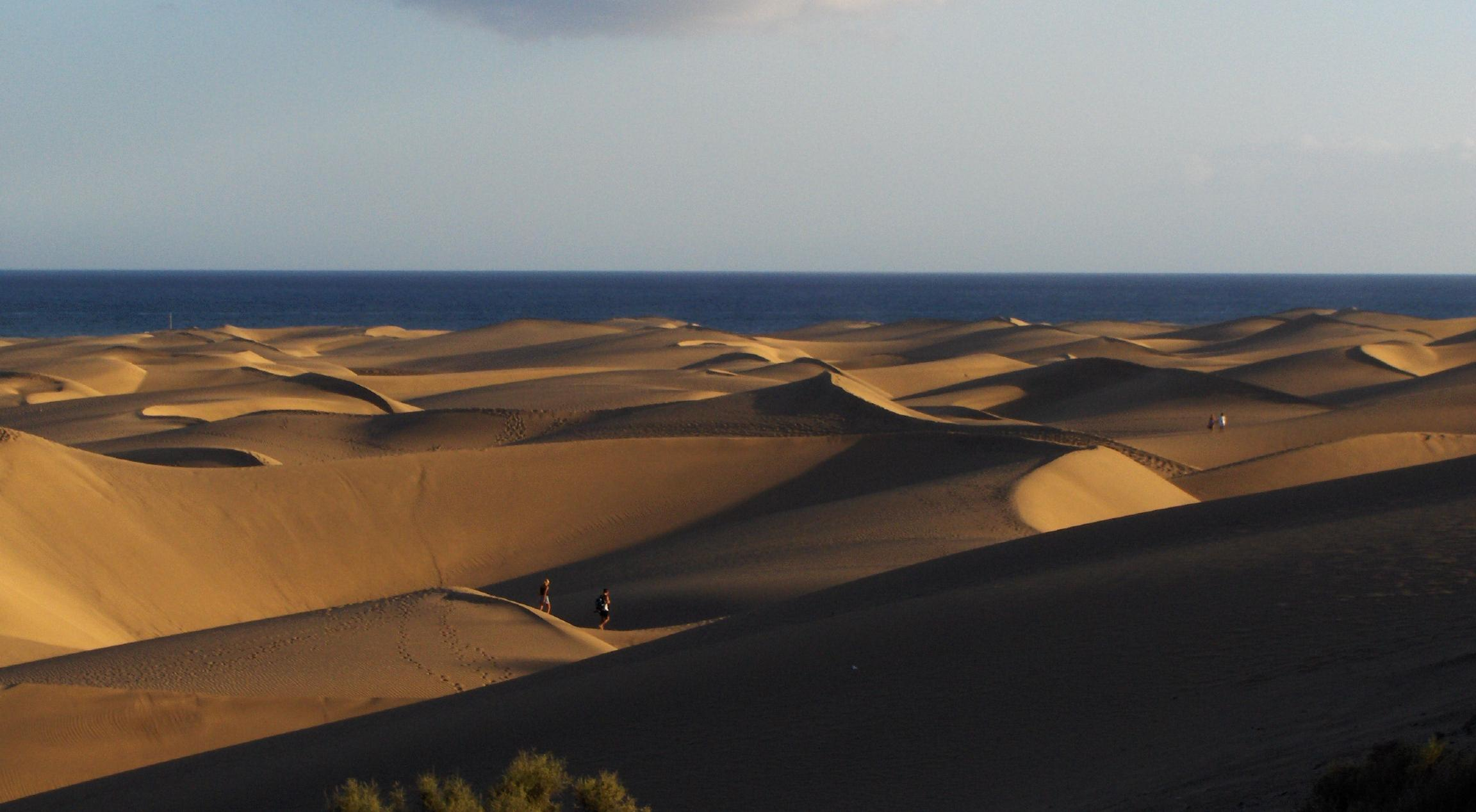
Maspalomas Dunes

Location of Maspalomas Dunes

The Maspalomas Dunes (Spanish: Dunas de Maspalomas) are sand dunes located on the south coast of the island of Gran Canaria, Province of Las Palmas, in the Canary Islands. A 404-hectare (1,000-acre) area of the municipality of San Bartolomé de Tirajana, they have been protected as a nature reserve since 1987. They were one of the contenders in the 12 Treasures of Spain competition.

They were formed by sand from the now subdued marine shelf, when it was laid dry during the last ice age and the wind blew the sand towards the coast of the island.
