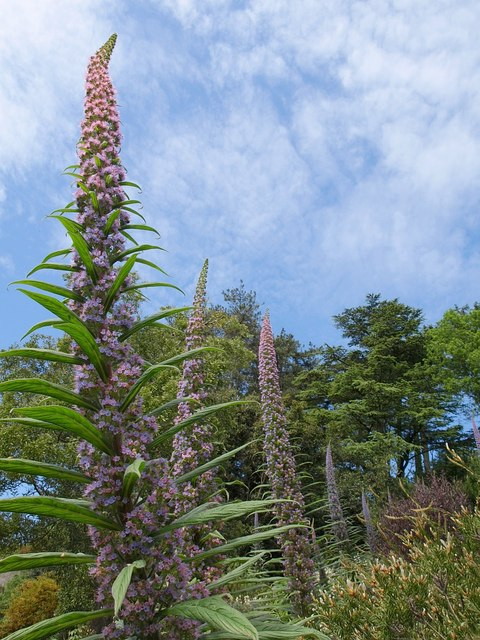

Conservation status
- Endangered (IUCN 3.1)

Scientific classification
- Kingdom: Plantae
- Clade: Tracheophytes
- Clade: Angiosperms
- Clade: Eudicots
- Clade: Asterids
- Order: Boraginales
- Family: Boraginaceae
- Genus: Echium
- Species: E. pininana

Binomial name
- Echium pininana Webb & Berthel., (Note: Echium pininana Webb & Berthel. is the preferred citation, although this species is also cited as Echium pininana Webb & Bernh., and Echium pininana Webb & Berth..) 1844

= Echium pininana =

Species of flowering plant

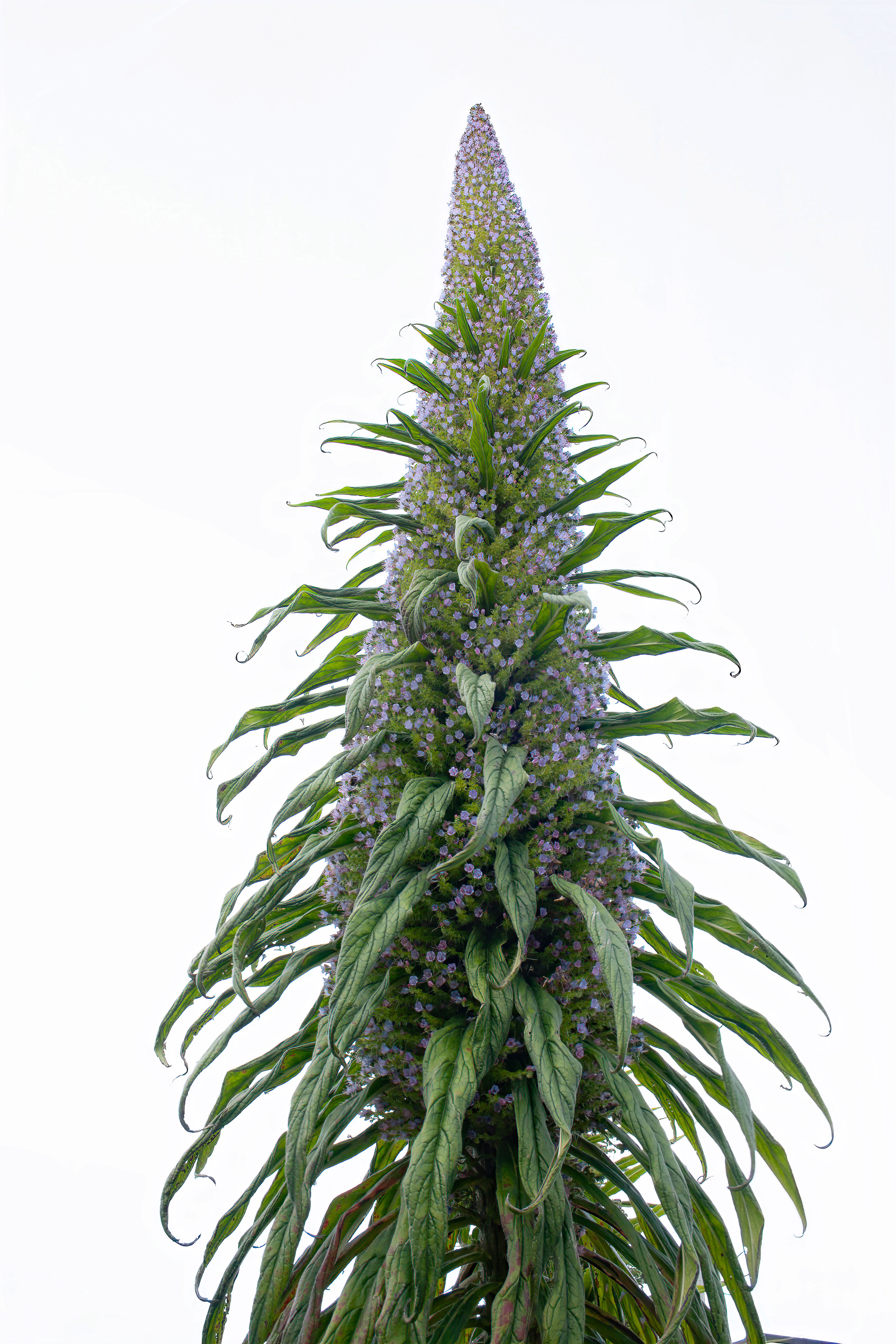
Echium pininana, Tree Echium.

Echium pininana, commonly known as the tree echium, pine echium, giant viper's-bugloss, or tower of jewels, is a species of flowering plant in the borage family Boraginaceae. It is endemic to the Canary Islands, where it is restricted to the island of La Palma. Echium pininana is an endangered species, and is listed in Appendix I to, and is therefore protected under, the Convention on the Conservation of European Wildlife and Natural Habitats. The specific epithet pininana is Latin for "small pine", though E. pininana is neither closely related to the pine, nor does it resemble that plant.

== Description ==
=== Lifecycle ===
Echium pininana is biennial or triennial, meaning each plant lives for only two or three years respectively. It is a monocarpic species; each plant flowers only once before dying.

=== Morphology ===
In their first year, plants produce a rosette of lanceolate leaves approximately 7 cm (3 in) in length, with silver hairs. Plants also produce a trunk 0.9–2.4 m (3–8 ft) tall in their first year, which is covered with many lanceolate leaves. In their second (or third) year, plants produce a cone-like inflorescence up to 4 m (13 ft) high with a dense mass of leaves and small blue flowers. Between April and June, the flower spike can grow 5 cm (2 in) per day. Flowers are funnel-shaped, and each produce up to 1.4 μL of nectar, which is approximately 26% sugar. Flowers at the bottom of the flower spike are first to open, with those at the top opening last. Pollinators such as bees, butterflies, and moths are attracted to the flowers. Following pollination, each flower produces four nutlets. Each plant can produce over 200,000 seeds, which are disbursed short distances by the wind.

=== Phytochemistry ===
Various pyrrolizidine alkaloids, a class of toxic organic compounds that may cause liver damage, have been isolated from Echium pininana. The plant is toxic to horses.

== Phylogeny ==
Echium pininana, E. simplex, and E. wildpretii comprise a monophyletic clade. All three of these Echium species are monocarpic, have a similar habit, similar floral morphology, and produce a dimethylated flavone not detected in other Echium species.

== Distribution and habitat ==
Echium pininana is endemic to the island of La Palma in the Canary Islands, where it grows in laurel forests. It is endangered due to habitat loss caused by agriculture. Outside La Palma, Echium pininana has been introduced to France, Great Britain, Ireland, New Zealand (both North and South Island), and the United States (north and central coast of California). It is also in ex situ conservation; in fact, the ex situ conservation population is greater than the wild population. It is conserved in botanical gardens such as Kew Gardens in London, where it has naturalised.

== Cultivation ==
Echium pininana is cultivated as a garden ornamental, and has gained the Royal Horticultural Society's Award of Garden Merit. It is used as a bedding plant or planted in borders, and grows best in full sun. It is recommended for the southern maritime counties of England, the Channel Islands and the Scilly Isles. There are, however, reports of successful cultivation in the English Midlands and Yorkshire, albeit in favourable locations. Specimens are also grown in Dublin gardens at Howth and in the Irish National Botanic Gardens at Glasnevin. The plant also grows readily in North Wales where it seeds very widely. Although E. pininana is half-hardy in Britain and Ireland, it will self-seed to form clusters of plants, and it is suggested that by natural selection a hardier variety will emerge. The plant is most vulnerable to frosts in its first year. Because of its large leaves when partly grown, it is also very susceptible to wind damage. Hence a sheltered garden position is essential. Echium pininana 'Alba' is a cultivar with white flowers.
