= 12 Treasures of Spain =

2007 competition that selected the "Twelve Treasures of the Kingdom of Spain"

The 12 Treasures of Spain (Spanish: 12 Tesoros de España) was a project that selected the purported "Twelve Treasures of the Kingdom of Spain". The contest was conducted by broadcasters Antena 3 and COPE. The final results were announced on 31 December 2007. Nine architectural monuments, two natural monuments and a monument pictorial were chosen.

== Contest ==
Four months after the international competition to choose the New Seven Wonders of the World, in late September 2007, Antena 3 and Onda Cero launched a campaign to elect the 12 so-called Treasures of Spain, an initiative based on the votes of the people, through internet and mobile phone. Finally, they received over 9,000 applications, and the candidates were whittled down to 20. At first they were to choose 7 Treasures of Spain, but later that figure was changed to 12.

== Winners ==
The twelve winners in order of votes were:

Treasure	Location	Image
Mosque–Cathedral of Córdoba	Córdoba, Andalusia; 37°52′45.1″N 04°46′47″W	
Cave of Altamira	Santillana del Mar, Cantabria; 43°22′57″N 4°6′58″W	
Seville Cathedral	Seville, Andalusia; 37°23′9″N 5°59′35″W	
Alhambra	Granada, Andalusia; 37°10′37″N 3°35′24″W	
Basilica of Our Lady of the Pillar	Zaragoza, Aragon; 41°39′25″N 0°52′42″W	
Teide National Park	Tenerife, Canary Islands; 28°15′47″N 16°36′58″W	
Roman Theatre of Mérida	Mérida, Extremadura; 38°54′55.4″N 6°20′18.6″W	
Cathedral of Santiago de Compostela	(Galicia (Spain)) Santiago de Compostela, Galicia; 42°52′50.2″N 8°32′39.8″W	
Ciudad de las Artes y las Ciencias	Valencia, Valencian Community; 39°27′16.30″N 0°21′01.31″W	
Sagrada Família	Barcelona, Catalonia; 41°24′13″N 2°10′28″E	
Beach of La Concha	(Basque Country (autonomous community)) San Sebastián, Basque Country; 43°19′03″N 1°59′12″W	
Guggenheim Museum Bilbao	(Basque Country (autonomous community)) Bilbao, Basque Country; 43°16′06.98″N 2°56′03.43″W	

=== Map ===
12 Treasures of Spain

== Other finalists ==
Image	Treasure	Location
	Castle of Almansa	Almansa, Province of Albacete
	Palmeral of Elche	Elche, Province of Alicante
	Alcazaba of Almería	Almería, Province of Almería
	Cabo de Gata	Níjar, Province of Almería
	Park Güell	Barcelona, Province of Barcelona
	Casa Milá	Barcelona, Province of Barcelona
	Burgos Cathedral	Burgos, Province of Burgos
	Abbey of Santo Domingo de Silos	Santo Domingo de Silos, Province of Burgos
	Archaeological Site of Atapuerca	Atapuerca and Ibeas de Juarros, Province of Burgos
	Palacio de la Magdalena	Santander, Cantabria
	Historic City of Santillana del Mar	Santillana del Mar, Cantabria
	Peniscola Castle	Peniscola, Province of Castellón
	Historic City of Morella	Morella, Province of Castellón
	Royal Walls of Ceuta	Ceuta
	Historic City of Campo de Criptana	Campo de Criptana, Province of Ciudad Real
	Tablas de Daimiel	Daimiel and Villarrubia de los Ojos, Province of Ciudad Real
	Hanging Houses	Cuenca, Province of Cuenca
	Ciudad Encantada	Cuenca, Province of Cuenca
	Monfragüe	Province of Caceres
	Alcántara Bridge	Alcántara, Province of Cáceres
	Historic City of Cáceres	Cáceres, Province of Cáceres
	Historic City of Arcos de la Frontera	Arcos de la Frontera, Province of Cádiz
	Doñana	Provinces of Cádiz, Huelva and Sevilla
	Monastery of Santa Maria de Ripoll	Ripoll, Province of Gerona
	Sierra Nevada	Provinces of Almería and Granada
	Corta Atalaya	Minas de Riotinto, Province of Huelva
	Monastery of San Juan de la Peña	Santa Cruz de la Serós, Province of Huesca
	Palma Cathedral	Palma de Mallorca, Baleares
	Bellver Castle	Palma de Mallorca, Baleares
	Island of Cabrera	Baleares
	Historic City of Úbeda	Úbeda, Province of Jaén
	Jaén Cathedral	Jaén, Province of Jaén
	Baeza Cathedral	Baeza, Province of Jaén
	Tower of Hercules	A Coruña, Province of A Coruña
	Obradoiro Square	Santiago de Compostela, Province of A Coruña
	Monasteries of San Millán de la Cogolla	San Millán de la Cogolla, La Rioja
	Maspalomas Dunes	Gran Canaria, Province of Las Palmas
	Timanfaya	Lanzarote, Province of Las Palmas
	León Cathedral	León, Province of León
	Las Médulas	Province of León
	Roman Walls of Lugo	Lugo, Province of Lugo
	Seu Vella	Lleida, Province of Lleida
	Church of Sant Climent de Taüll	Taüll, Province of Lleida
	Monastery of El Escorial	San Lorenzo de El Escorial, Community of Madrid
	Royal Palace of Aranjuez	Aranjuez, Community of Madrid
	City Center of Alcalá de Henares	Alcalá de Henares, Community of Madrid
	Cathedral of Murcia	Murcia, Region of Murcia
	Roma theatre of Cartagena	Cartagena, Region of Murcia
	Mar Menor	Region of Murcia
	Torcal de Antequera	Antequera, Province of Málaga
	Puente Nuevo	Ronda, Province of Málaga
	Bardenas Reales	Navarre
	Royal Palace of Olite	Olite, Navarre
	Irati Forest	Navarre
	Picos de Europa	Cantabria, Asturias and Province of León
	Church of St Mary at Naranco	Oviedo, Asturias
	Sanctuary of Covadonga	Cangas de Onís, Asturias
	San Martín de Tours	Frómista, Province of Palencia
	Canal de Castilla	Provinces of Burgos, Palencia and Valladolid
	Monastery of San Xoán de Poio	Poio, Province of Pontevedra
	Cíes Islands	Province of Pontevedra
	Plaza Mayor de Salamanca	Salamanca, Province of Salamanca
	University of Salamanca	Salamanca, Province of Salamanca
	Historic Centre of San Cristóbal de la Laguna	San Cristóbal de La Laguna, Province of Santa Cruz
	Aqueduct of Segovia	Segovia, Province of Segovia
	Alcázar of Segovia	Segovia, Province of Segovia
	Palace of La Granja	La Granja de San Ildefonso, Province of Segovia
	Plaza de España	Seville, Province of Seville
	Neighbourhood of Triana	Seville, Province of Seville
	Burgo de Osma Cathedral	El Burgo de Osma, Province of Soria
	Archaeological Ensemble of Tarragona	Tarragona, Province of Tarragona
	Historic City of Albarracín	Albarracín, Province of Teruel
	Historic Centre of Toledo	Toledo, Province of Toledo
	Alcázar of Toledo	Toledo, Province of Toledo
	Toledo Cathedral	Toledo, Province of Toledo
	Llotja de la Seda	Valencia, Province of Valencia
	Peñafiel Castle	Peñafiel, Province of Valladolid
	Colegio de San Gregorio	Valladolid, Province of Valladolid
	Vizcaya Bridge	Portugalete and Getxo, Province of Biscay
	San Juan de Gaztelugatxe	Bermeo, Province of Biscay
	Historic Centre of Getxo	Getxo, Province of Biscay
	Zamora Cathedral	Zamora, Province of Zamora
	Monasterio de Piedra	Nuévalos, Province of Zaragoza
	Aljafería Palace	Zaragoza, Province of Zaragoza
	Ávila Cathedral	Ávila, Province of Ávila
	Walls of Ávila	Ávila, Province of Ávila

== See also ==
- New 7 Wonders of Nature
- New 7 Wonders of the World
- Seven Wonders of the Ancient World
