= Saint-Paul, Quebec =

Saint-Paul
- Municipality
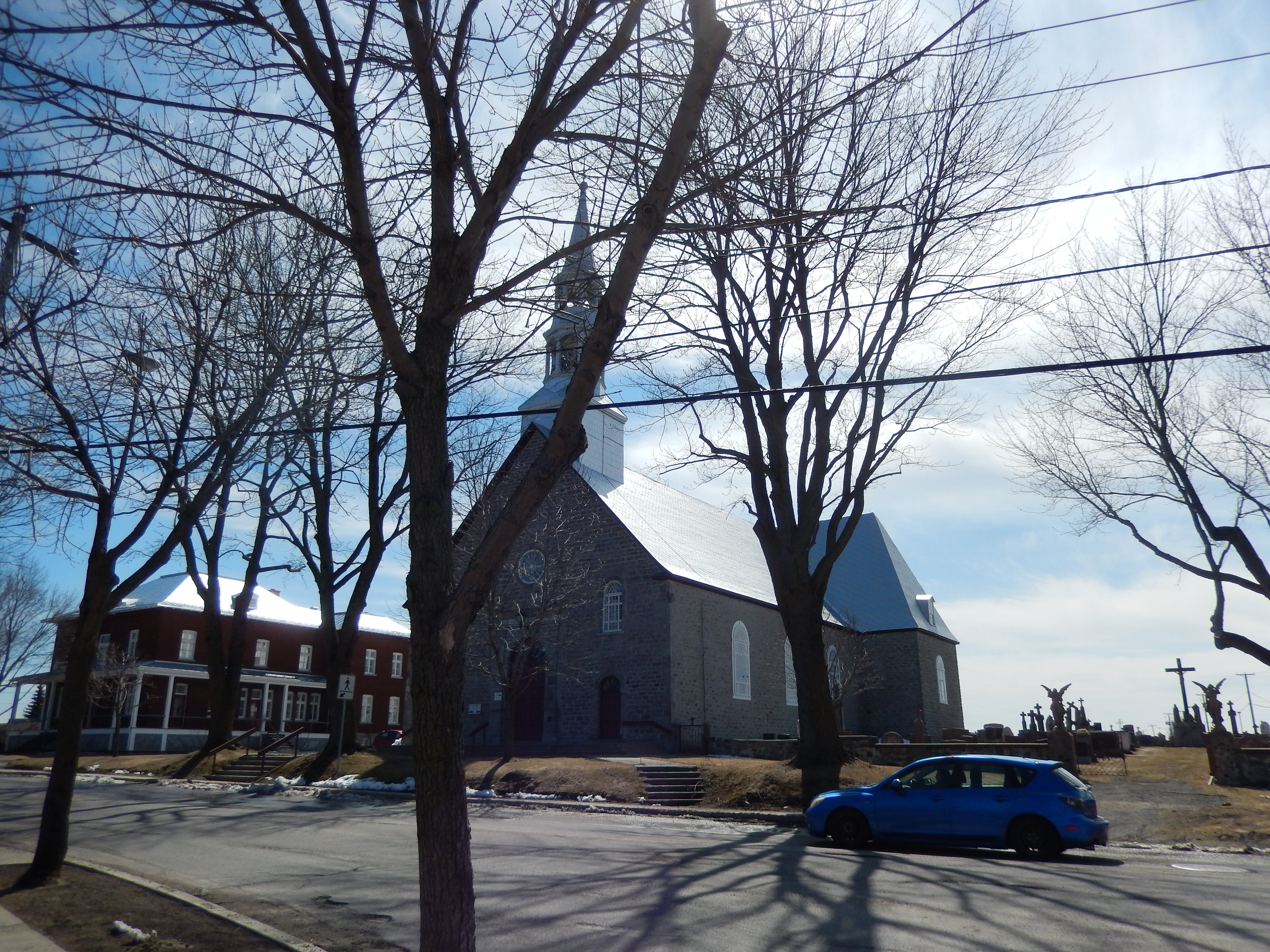
- Saint-Paul's church

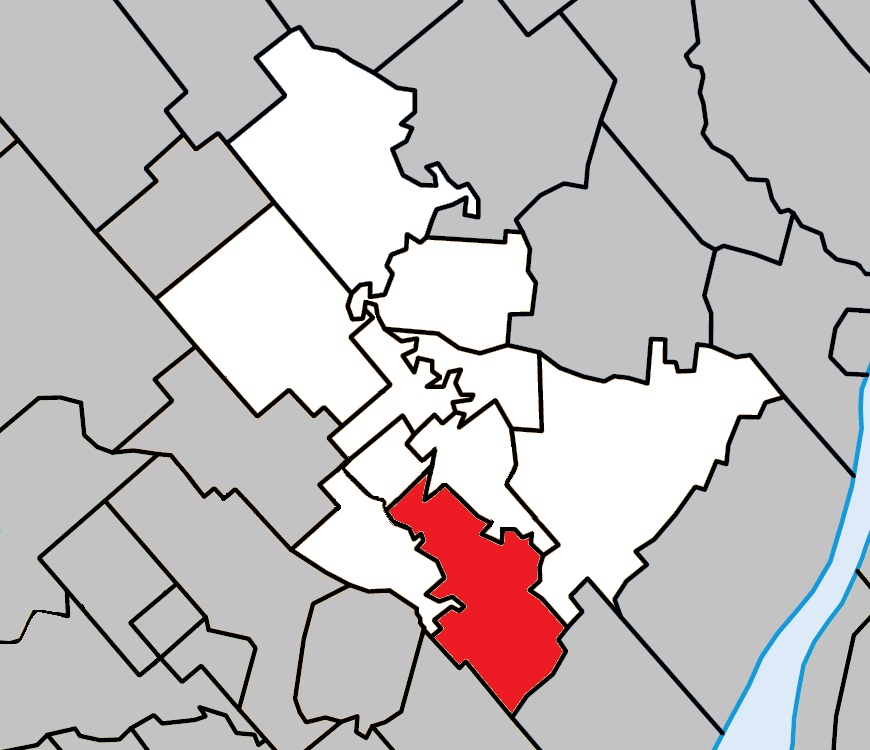
- Location within Joliette RCM

- Location in central Quebec
- Coordinates: 45°59′N 73°27′W
- Country: Canada
- Province: Quebec
- Region: Lanaudière
- RCM: Joliette
- Constituted: July 1, 1855

Government
  - Mayor: Marc Pelletier
  - Federal riding: Joliette
  - Prov. riding: Joliette

Area
  - Total: 49.90 km^{2} (19.27 sq mi)
  - Land: 49.11 km^{2} (18.96 sq mi)

Population (2021)
  - Total: 6,566
  - Density: 133.7/km^{2} (346/sq mi)
  - Pop 2016-2021: ▲11.5%
  - Dwellings: 2,755
- Time zone: UTC−5 (EST)
  - Summer (DST): UTC−4 (EDT)
- Postal code(s): J0K 3E0
- Area codes: 450 and 579
- Highways: R-158; R-343
- Website: www.municipalite stpaul.qc.ca

Saint-Paul (French pronunciation: [sɛ̃ pɔl]) is a municipality in the Lanaudière region of Quebec, Canada, part of the Joliette Regional County Municipality.

== History ==
Saint-Paul was born in the northeast of the former Lordship of Lavaltrie. The first settlers, mainly from Saint-Pierre-du-Portage (L’Assomption) and Saint-Sulpice, cleared the territory gradually. First along the L’Assomption River around 1748, then on the coast of the Ouareau River around 1750 and on the Saint-Pierre stream around 1765. The population grew rapidly. Then, the territory was known as Saint-Paul-de-Lavaltrie

In 1855, the Parliament of United Canada passed the Lower Canada Municipalities and Roads Act to ensure the legal existence of many localities. That year, on July 1, a municipality was officially born under the name Conversion-de-Saint-Paul. In April 1922, the more urban sector of Conversion-de-Saint-Paul split away to form the new village municipality of Saint-Paul. That village changed its name seven years later to become the current village of Saint-Pierre. Meanwhile the rural Conversion-de-Saint-Paul would eventually change its name to only Saint-Paul, in 1954, to become the current municipality.

== Demographics ==
According to the 2021 Census of Population conducted by Statistics Canada, Saint-Paul had a population of 6,566 living in 2,701 of its 2,755 total private dwellings, a change of 11.5% from its 2016 population of 5,891. The average household size is 2.4 people. With a land area of 49.11 km^{2} (18.96 sq mi), it had a population density of 133.7/km^{2} (346.3/sq mi) in 2021. As of 2021, the average age of the population is 38.5 years.

=== Population trend ===
- Population in 2021: 6,566 (2016 to 2021 population change: 11.5%)
- Population in 2016: 5,891
- Population in 2011: 5,122
- Population in 2006: 3,987
- Population in 2001: 3,606
- Population in 1996: 3,644
- Population in 1991: 3,648
- Population in 1986: 3,388
- Population in 1981: 3,389
- Population in 1976: 2,796
- Population in 1971: 2,270
- Population in 1966: 1,925
- Population in 1961: 1,654
- Population in 1956: 1,384
- Population in 1951: 1,082
- Population in 1941: 859
- Population in 1931: 797
- Population in 1921: 1,769
- Population in 1911: 1,433
- Population in 1901: 1,470
- Population in 1891: 1,485
- Population in 1881: 1,822
- Population in 1871: 1,943
- Population in 1861: 2,073

Private dwellings occupied by usual residents: 2,701 (total dwellings: 2,755)

=== Mother tongue ===
- English as first language: 0.8%
- French as first language: 95.8%
- English and French as first language: 0.8%
- Other as first language: 1.9%

== Attractions ==
The church of Saint-Paul was built in 1803. There are major artistic pieces there, notably the canvas illustrating the preaching is the work of the painter Louis Dulongpré. In addition, a good part of the ornamentation with gold leaf, the sounding board as well as the Easter candlestick are the work of the sculptor Pierre Guibord who was also the first mayor of Saint-Paul. The architecture of the church has remained the same since its construction and is now listed as a historical monument.

Saint-Paul is also home to an alpaca breeding farm, the farm is open to visitors and also offers clothes made from alpaca wool.

== Education ==
Commission scolaire des Samares operates francophone public schools, including:

- École La Passerelle
  - pavillon Notre-Dame-du-Sacré-Coeur
  - pavillon Vert-Demain

The Sir Wilfrid Laurier School Board operates anglophone public schools, including:

- Joliette Elementary School in Saint-Charles-Borromée
- Joliette High School in Joliette

The sole private school is operated by a cult, Mission de l'Esprit-Saint. It opened in 2016, following the foreclosure of the former illegal school, a decade ago :

- École l'Accord

== See also ==
- List of municipalities in Quebec
