= Mission of the Holy Spirit =

New religious movement in Québec

The Mission de l'Esprit Saint (English: Mission of the Holy Spirit) is a religious movement founded in 1913 and located mainly in Quebec. Its ideology is based on the teachings of Eugène Richer dit La Flèche (Saint-Georges-de-Windsor, Quebec, April 17, 1871 – Los Angeles, January 10, 1925), who, according to his followers, was the embodiment of the third person of the Trinity, the Holy Spirit.

== Beliefs ==
Richer taught and his followers to believe that he was the embodiment of the Holy Spirit, completing the Holy Trinity. He believed in an approach to Christianity that is generational, which he believed would lead to better generations of people to attain the Kingdom of God. They believe in betterment of the human soul by improving themselves throughout their life and in raising children who are better than themselves by following the example set forth by Jesus Christ.

Members of the Mission believe that Richer brought a man back to life on the Place d'Armes (Montreal) and that he predicted the execution of the family of Tsar Nicholas II. They also believe in reincarnation and that the souls of the faithful slip themselves into the embryos of good mothers.

== Membership ==
According to Statistics Canada, 515 people declared themselves members in the 2011 National Household Survey. The Mission is divided geographically into six independent branches.

== Education ==
Some extremists in the sect keep their children out of the public schools and have made various attempts at educating their children themselves. This has led to ongoing conflict with the provincial government.

In 2004 the Institut Laflèche, an illegal school founded by the sect, was ordered closed by the Ministry of Education. Teaching was carried out by volunteer parents and ignored the provincial curriculum. The decision to close the school was confirmed by the Superior Court of Quebec in 2007.

Refusing to send their children to the public schools, the members of the Mission decided to homeschool them, under the supervision of the Samares school board. In 2006 test results showed low pass rates in mathematics (59% in primary school, 27% in secondary school) and in reading (61% in primary school, 48% in secondary school).

In 2016, the Ministry of Education allowed the opening of a private school, the Accord school, in Saint-Paul. The school was to conform to the provincial curriculum and have qualified teachers. The pupils would have to pray twice a day and recite a booklet containing the principal beliefs of the sect twice a week. In 2019, the Ministry of Education withdrew the school's permit on the grounds of failure to follow the law on private schools. Notably, the school had reported an enrollment of 15 pupils for the academic year 2018–2019 whereas it actually had more than 60. It also lacked qualified teachers and adequate financial resources. Legal action has been required to force the school to release the names of the children enrolled.

== Scandals ==
Accusations of sexual assault, medical mistreatment, and deprivation of education of many sect members have frequently been reported in the press. These crimes have primarily been inflicted on women and children and have been the subject of several television documentaries.
