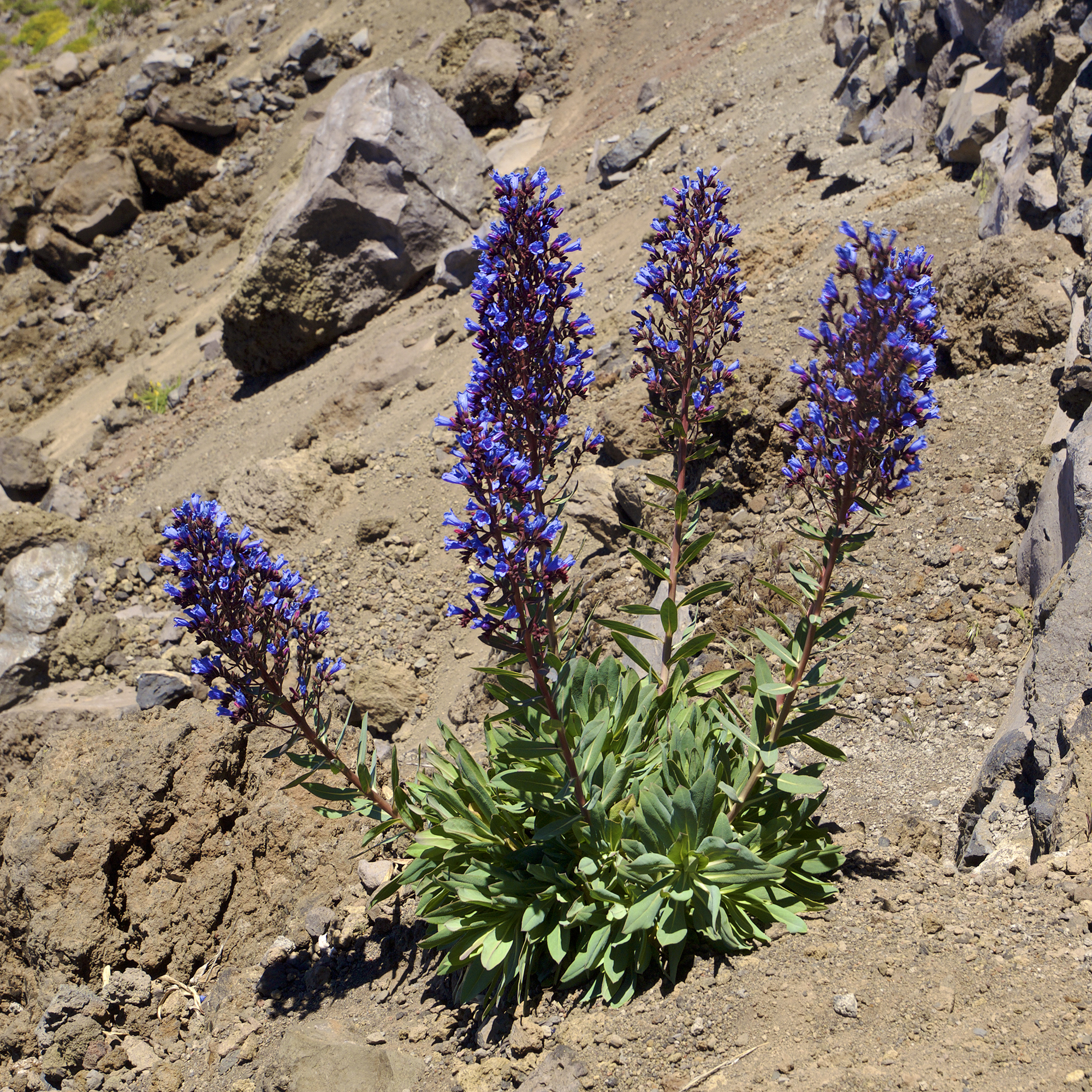

Conservation status
- Vulnerable (IUCN 3.1)

Scientific classification
- Kingdom: Plantae
- Clade: Embryophytes
- Clade: Tracheophytes
- Clade: Angiosperms
- Clade: Eudicots
- Clade: Asterids
- Order: Boraginales
- Family: Boraginaceae
- Genus: Echium
- Species: E. thyrsiflorum

Binomial name
- Echium thyrsiflorum Masson ex Link

Synonyms
- Echium fastuosum Banks ex Link; Echium gentianoides Webb ex Coincy

= Echium thyrsiflorum =

Species of flowering plant

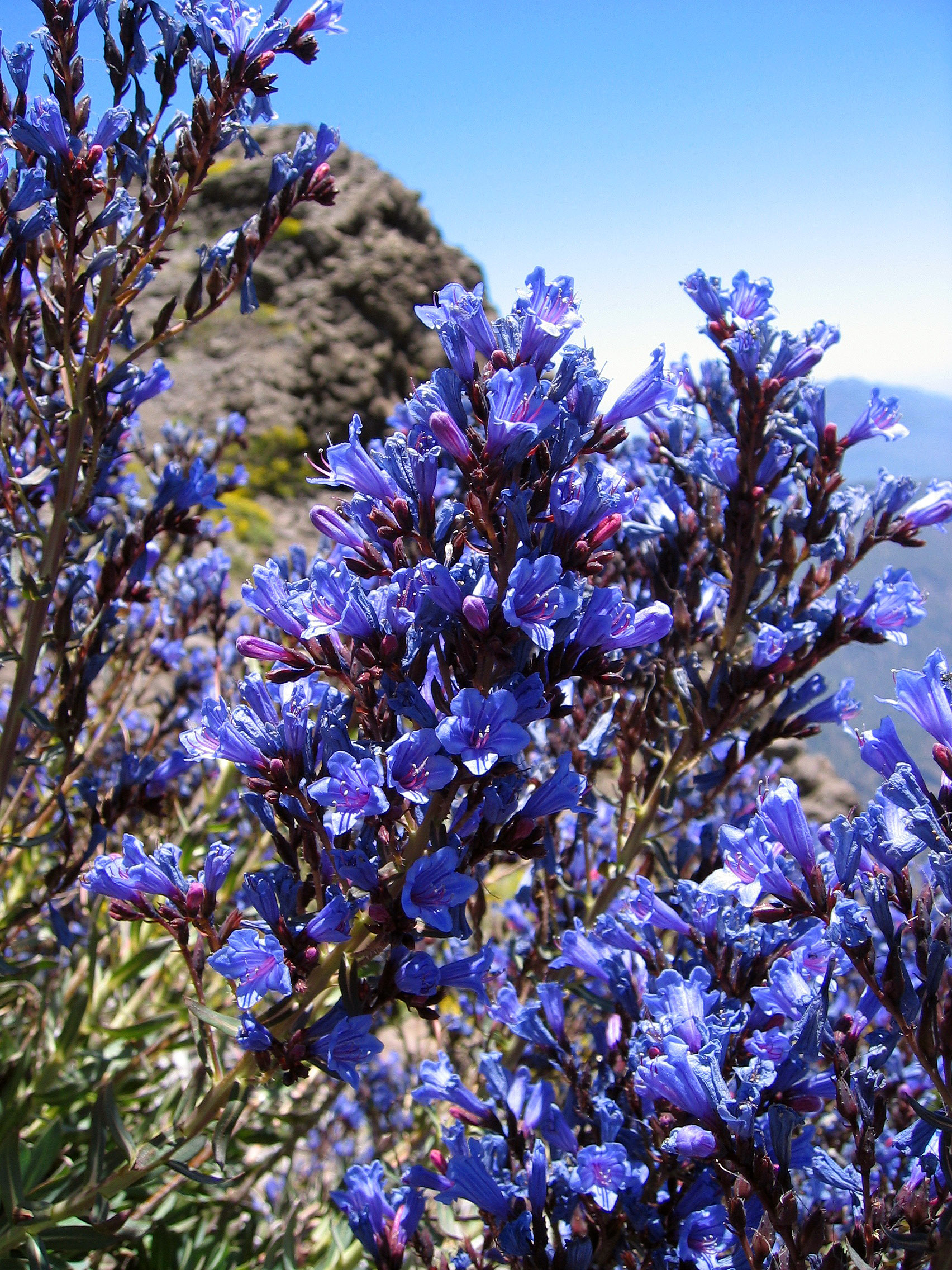
Flower details

Echium thyrsiflorum is a flowering plant in the family Boraginaceae. It is endemic to the island of La Palma in the Canary Islands. It occurs only ob La Caldera de Taburiente, where it grows in sunny, rocky sites above 1,800 m (5,900 ft). Its common name in Spanish is tajinaste palmero de cumbre.

In 2011 it was listed as vulnerable on the International Union for Conservation of Nature's Red List under criterion D2, with its area of occupancy estimated to be 13–28 km^{2} (5.0–10.8 sq mi). The main threat described for this species is predation by goats and insects.
