= Aliens Adored =

2004 book by Susan J. Palmer

- Cover of the first edition
- Author: Susan J. Palmer
- Language: English
- Subject: Raëlism
- Publisher: Rutgers University Press
- Publication date: 2004
- Publication place: United States
- Pages: 226
- ISBN: 0-8135-3475-5
- OCLC: 54073388
- Dewey Decimal: 299
- LC Class: BP605.R338P35 2004

Aliens Adored: Raël's UFO Religion is a book by Susan J. Palmer, published in 2004 by Rutgers University Press. The book is an ethnography of Raëlism, a UFO religion that gained notoriety in the year 2000 for its claims that it had cloned a human being. Palmer, a sociologist of religion, had studied the Raëlians for over a decade, and had personally interviewed both members of the group and its founder, Raël. The book analyzes many aspects of the organization, including its leader, members, ethics and theology.

Aliens Adored received critical acclaim, with reviewers praising its analysis and its balanced treatment of the group, as well as its readability for both experts and non-experts.

== Background ==
Susan J. Palmer is a sociologist of religion, and at the time of the book's publication was a teacher of religious studies at Dawson College. Palmer had studied the Raëlians since 1987, and had met Raël several times. The Raëlians consented to being interviewed by Palmer and her students, wanting to convert them.

Raëlism is a new religious movement (NRM), classified as a UFO religion. The group was founded after Claude Vorilhon (who changed his name to Raël) claimed in 1973 he had been visited by aliens. Raël said they told him that all life on earth had been created by extraterrestrial scientists and warned him of a nuclear apocalypse. The group, then based in Montreal, claimed to have 65,000 members in sixty countries, though this could not be verified. They believed in free thought, sexual liberation, and anti-Catholicism.

In the year 2000, Raëlism made the headlines due to its claims that it had cloned a human being; however, when their supposed cloning facilities were searched by investigators, it was found to be a fake, and the supposed cloned infant was never found. Only a few years before this Raël had founded the Order of Raël's Angels, an organization that gave him sexual privileges with women, who were not allowed to have sex with anyone else. Their usage of a swastika in their logo attracted controversy, especially from Jewish people (who they wished to preach to), as did their attitude towards sexual freedom.

== Contents ==
The book has nine chapters, arranged by theme, and is an ethnography. It was partially based on interviews with several members of the group. Following an introduction giving historical context for UFO religions and contact, it gives a biography of Raël's life. Palmer compares Raël to past men of the Enlightenment, who, in her view, tried to replace religion with scientific thought, or combine them.

Palmer argues that Raëlian belief is a response to the increased secularization of society. She attempts to analyze the actual number of people in the movement, concluding that the suggested count by the movement is likely an inflated total, though she argues their account of the overall structure is reliable.

She discusses the stories and grievances of former members, as well as schisms, including testimony from a former Raëlian, who accused Raël of using money meant to build the group's alien embassy on his race car hobby. She argues that, overall, former Raëlians are not regretful of joining the movement or angry at its leader, though in one interview a former member criticized the toll it took on the members' marriages.

The penultimate chapter covers the group's claims that Raëlians had successfully cloned a human, to which Palmer expresses her doubts.

== Reception ==
Aliens Adored received critical acclaim, with many reviewers highly recommending it; Robert Ellwood said it was "the book about the Raelians for which we have been waiting". Publishers Weekly gave the book a starred review, praising it as being a serious academic work but simultaneously "downright fun", noting it as a "rare-full length" assessment of the Raëlians. Choice highly recommended the book, describing it as a "superb study of UFO religion" and praised Palmer's writing, analysis, and the extensiveness of her research, while a reviewer for the Canadian Journal of Sociology described it as "fascinating" and praised its contribution to the literature of NRMs. Jon von Heyking said that the book "demonstrates that [Raëlism] is a cult of technology that, despite its weirdness, clearly expresses the aspirations of our technological society".

The book was largely praised as an objective assessment of Raëlism, not straying too far to criticism or apologism. Booklist called it "generally objective" though noted Palmer "had her suspicions" about many of the Raëlians' claims. They further said that Palmer "treats seriously a religious movement that many do not", due to the perceived strangeness of Raëlian ideology; Publishers Weekly called it a "balanced portrait". A review in the Montreal Gazette argued that Palmer treated them too seriously and did not analyze some of their stranger claims, but described the book as having "all the makings of a TV movie". Von Heyking described Palmer's perspective as shifting throughout the book, at first viewing Raël positively as a prophet and artist, then critical and skeptical later on after uncovering his fraudulent actions. He noted that it was "difficult to determine" if Palmer had genuinely become more critical in the process of writing the book, or if she had just been attempting to appear uncritical so she could have access to the group (an alternative possibility being that the initial "open-mindedness" was merely an expression of "the existential boredom of a sociologist" dabbling in "exotic secondary realities"). Von Heyking described the book's final chapter as "effectively uncover[ing] the fraud that hides under their technological utopia."

The book's writing style was generally praised; several reviewers praised its readability for both scholarly and non-scholarly readers. The Montreal Gazette said the work of both Palmer and her students was "lively and engaging", though James T. Richardson described it as easy to read but said that it was written in a "casual, even partially tongue-in-cheek" manner that might be off-putting to some readers.

Ellwood pointed out some mistakes in the book relating to background information, such as incorrectly dating Charles Fourier. One reviewer argued that though some aspects of the book showed Palmer could reflect on the circumstances of her scholarship, she did not completely consider how her status as a "cult expert" influenced her ideas of objectivity, or the many cultural debates that her career involved her in, but overall considered the book a "laudable example for subsequent scholarship".
