= Atman Foundation =

New religious movement

- Trainingszentrum zur Freisetzung der Atmaenergie
- Type: New religious movement
- Classification: Hindu
- Founder: Heide Fittkau-Garthe
- Origin: 1994
- Separated from: Brahma Kumaris
- Other name(s): Isis Holistic Center

The Atman Foundation (German: Trainingszentrum zur Freisetzung der Atmaenergie), also called the Isis Holistic Center, was a new religious movement founded by German psychologist Heide Fittkau-Garthe. A schism from the Brahma Kumaris, it was active mainly on the island of Tenerife in the Canary Islands (Spain), and in Germany. It is best known for a media scare in which an alleged attempt to commit ritual suicide took place in Teide National Park in Tenerife in 1998. However, later commentators disputed this, claiming there was no intention to commit suicide by the group.

== History ==
Heide Garthe was born in Berlin, Germany in 1941. Following her graduation from high school, she trained as a psychologist, receiving her doctorate at age 26. She married Bernd Fittkau, a psychology professor. She joined the Brahma Kumaris, a Hindu-based spiritual movement, in 1980, and would later become a high-ranking official of the group in Germany; after which she would divorce Fittkau. On 15 August 1994, she sold all her assets and moved to the island of Tenerife in the Canary Islands. She founded the Atman Foundation (German: Trainingszentrum zur Freisetzung der Atmaenergie), active mainly on Tenerife and in Germany. The group was a schism from the Brahma Kumaris.

According to Angela Gabriela, a former member of the sect, the highlight of the ritual was the "love ring." This practice consisted of huge orgies, even between members of the same family.

== Alleged mass suicide plan ==
On January 8, 1998, Fittkau-Garthe was alleged to have attempted suicide with her followers in Teide National Park, resulting in a police raid on the premises that the sect had in Santa Cruz de Tenerife. Apparently, the 32 members of the sect believed that they would be collected by a spacecraft and taken to an unspecified destination. Failing that, they were believed to be going to commit suicide. Following this, Fittkau-Garthe and other members were arrested. The group was thought to be planning to drink fruit juice laced with poison, which was confiscated during the raid. On analysis, the fruit juice was found not to contain any poison and were actually flower essences and homeopathic medicine. What was deemed a last supper turned out to be a picnic and meditation session.

Media reports and police following the arrest said that they were an offshoot of the Order of the Solar Temple (a group that had repeatedly died by acts of mass murder and suicide through the 1990s). The media across the world ran several headlines repeating this information, focusing on the Solar Temple and the mass suicide. It was later clarified that the group had nothing to do with the Solar Temple, though a family of ex-members said the group was "just as bad".

== Aftermath ==
In Germany police investigations of the group failed to turn up evidence that the group had planned a mass suicide, although the accusation still remained in Spain as of 2004 with no trial scheduled. In Spain all charges were eventually dropped against members of the group due to lack of evidence. The acquittal of Fittkau-Garthe in Spain received almost no attention in the news.

Later articles in Tenerife News and Diario de Avisos disputed the earlier story, saying there was no intention to commit suicide by the group. When interviewed by a local daily newspaper, Fittkau-Garthe claimed that the group was not a cult, and that a daughter of a member of the group had contacted Interpol and accused them of plotting a mass suicide after a family row. The rumor that it was mass suicide possibly stemmed from Fittkau-Garthe's estranged brother.

Susan J. Palmer viewed the group as an example of rumors leading to a miscarriage of justice around cults, while German researchers George Schmid and Oswald Eggenberger viewed of the concerns of the police as understandable, arguing the group had many similarities to those that had committed mass suicide in the past. They particularly noted the small size of the community as a cause for concern, arguing that those are susceptible to radicalizing in that sense more so than larger groups.
