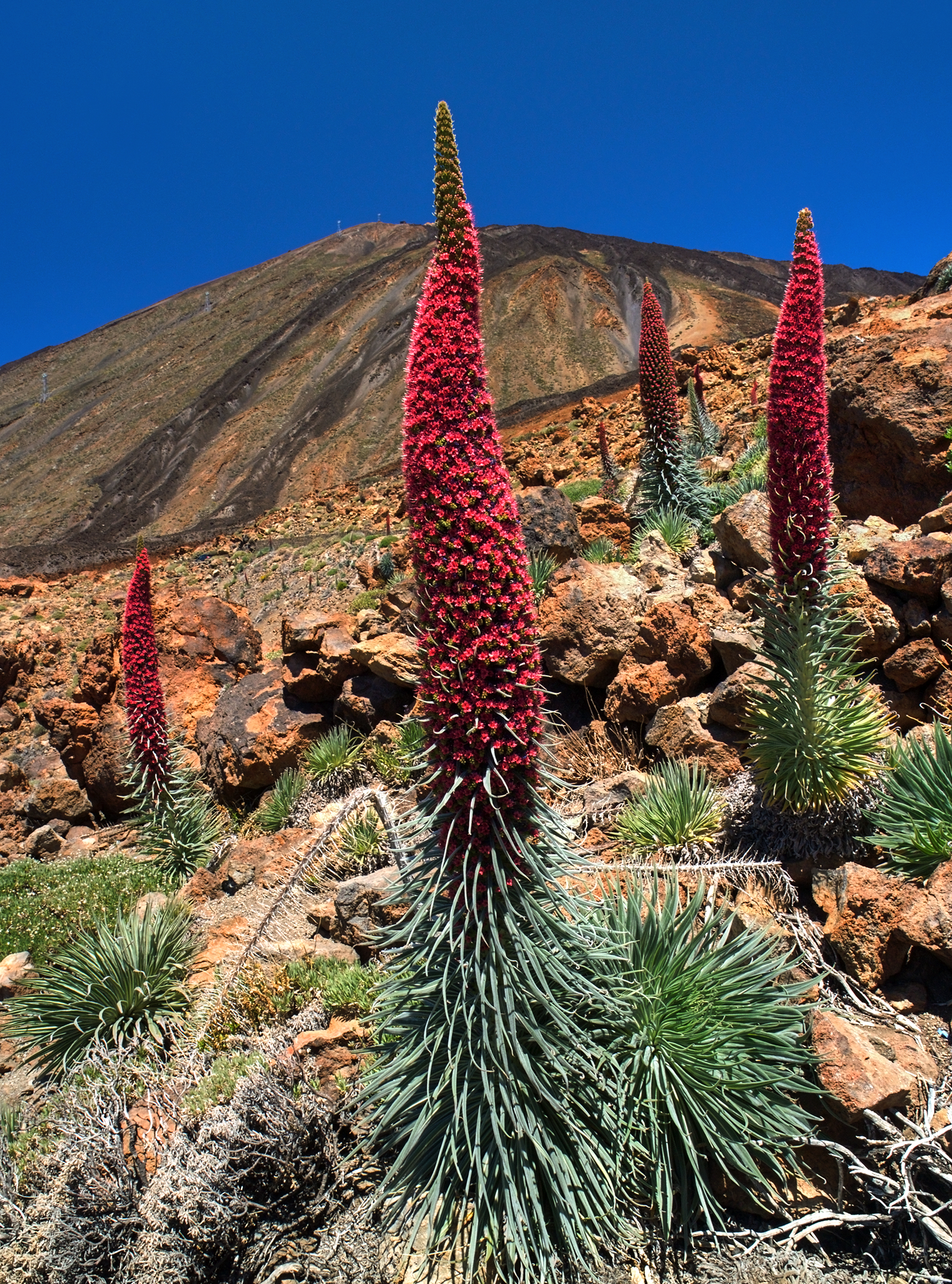
- Echium wildpretii on Tenerife

Scientific classification
- Kingdom: Plantae
- Clade: Embryophytes
- Clade: Tracheophytes
- Clade: Angiosperms
- Clade: Eudicots
- Clade: Asterids
- Order: Boraginales
- Family: Boraginaceae
- Genus: Echium
- Species: E. wildpretii

Binomial name
- Echium wildpretii H.Pearson ex Hook.f.

= Echium wildpretii =

Species of flowering plant in the borage family

Echium wildpretii is a species of flowering plant in the family Boraginaceae. It is an herbaceous biennial plant that grows up to 3 m (10 ft) in height. The species is endemic to the Canary Islands, and is found mainly in the national park surrounding Mount Teide in Tenerife. A similar species, Echium perezii, occurs at high altitudes on the island of La Palma. Other common names are tower of jewels, red bugloss, Tenerife bugloss, Mount Teide bugloss or red tajinaste.

== Etymology ==
The Latin specific epithet wildpretii honours the 19th-century Swiss botanist Hermann Josef Wildpret.

== Description ==
It is a biennial, producing a dense rosette of leaves during the first year, flowers in the second year, and then dies. The red flowers are borne on an erect inflorescence, 1–3 m (3 ft 3 in – 9 ft 10 in). The plant blooms from late spring to early summer in Tenerife.

== Habitat ==
The plant grows in the subalpine zone of the ravines of Mount Teide, a volcano on Tenerife in the Canary Islands, Spain. It requires a lot of sun and is found in arid and dry conditions, but it tolerates frost down to −5 °C (23 °F). As a sub-alpine endemic plant with a narrow climatic niche and small distribution, the species is likely to be negatively impacted by climate change.

== Inbreeding depression ==
Under conditions where water availability was normal there was no indication of inbreeding depression measured as seedling survival. However, when the seedlings were subject to drought stress conditions, inbreeding depression was high (survival about 50.2%).

== Uses ==
This plant can be found as a garden ornamental but is intolerant of low temperatures, thus some winter protection is required in frost-prone areas. It has gained the Royal Horticultural Society's Award of Garden Merit. As with most buglosses, it is valued by bee-keepers for its high nectar content.

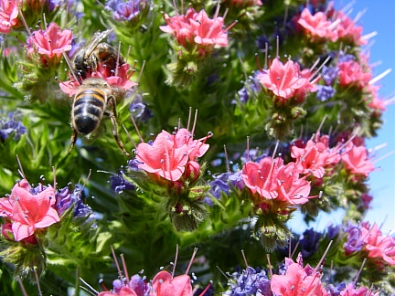
Close-up of inflorescence
