= Susan J. Palmer =

Canadian sociologist (born 1946)

Susan Palmer
- Born: 1946 (age 79–80)
- Occupations: Writer, professor
- Known for: Study of new religious movements
- Children: 2

Academic background
- Education: Doctor of Philosophy
- Alma mater: McGill University (BA); Concordia University (PhD)

Academic work
- Discipline: Sociologist
- Main interests: New religious movements

Susan Jean Palmer (born 1946) is a Canadian sociologist of religion and author whose primary research interest is new religious movements. Formerly a professor of religious studies at Dawson College in Westmount, Quebec, she is currently an Affiliate Professor at Concordia University. She has authored and edited several books on NRMs.

== Early life and education ==
Palmer was raised in the Mormon faith. Her great-grandparents were polygamist Mormons, who moved to Canada from the United States to avoid the U.S. law against polygamy. Palmer received a BA in Honours English at McGill University before she received her Masters and PhD in Religion from Concordia University.

== Career ==
Palmer was a professor of religious studies at Dawson College in Westmount, Quebec, before becoming she is currently an Affiliate Professor at Concordia University, and is also the Principal Investigator on the four-year SSHRC-funded research project, "Children in Sectarian Religions" at McGill University in Montreal, where she teaches courses on new religious movements.

== Work ==
Her topics range from apocalyptic activity, prophecy, charisma, communalism, childrearing, racialist religions, to research ethics and methods in studying new religions. Her article "Caught Up in the Cult Wars: Confessions of a Canadian Researcher" has reappeared in several anthologies. Her book Aliens Adored documents the formation and beliefs of the Raëlian movement, with an eye to how scientific discoveries contribute to the formation of their human cloning theology. Her most recent work has focused on religious freedom issues. The New Heretics of France explores the state-sponsored persecution of religious minorities.

== Personal life ==
She has two children, a son and a daughter. Outside of her academic interest in religion, she also has an interest in martial arts and choir singing.

== Bibliography ==
- ——; Sharma, Arvind (1993). The Rajneesh Papers: Studies in a New Religious Movement. Motilal Banarsidass Publishers. ISBN 81-208-1080-5.
- —— (1994). Moon Sisters, Krishna Mothers, Rajneesh Lovers: Women's Roles in New Religions. Syracuse University Press. ISBN 0-8156-0382-7.
- Robbins, Thomas; ——, eds. (1997). Millennium, Messiahs, and Mayhem: Contemporary Apocalyptic Movements. Routledge. ISBN 0-415-91649-6.
- —— (1997). AIDS as an Apocalyptic Metaphor in North America. University of Toronto Press. ISBN 0-802-00662-0.
- ——; Hardman, Charlotte E., eds. (1999). Children in New Religions. Rutgers University Press. ISBN 0-8135-2620-5.
- —— (2004). Aliens Adored: Rael's UFO Religion. Rutgers University Press. ISBN 0-8135-3475-5.
- —— (2010). The Nuwaubian Nation: Black Spirituality and State Control. Ashgate Publishing. ISBN 978-0-7546-6255-6.
- —— (2011). The New Heretics of France: Minority Religions, la Republique, and the Government-Sponsored "War on Sects". Oxford University Press. ISBN 978-0-19-973521-1.
- Wright, Stuart A.; —— (2016). Storming Zion: Exploring State Raids on Religious Communities. Oxford University Press. ISBN 978-0-19-539889-2.
- ——; Geoffroy, Martin; Gareau, Paul L., eds. (2020). The Mystical Geography of Quebec: Catholic Schisms and New Religious Movements. Palgrave Macmillan. ISBN 978-3-0303-3061-3.
- ——; Mahmut, Dilmurat; Udun, Abdulmuqtedir, eds. (2024). Uyghur Women Activists in the Diaspora: Restorying a Genocide. Bloomsbury Studies in Religion, Gender, and Sexuality. Bloomsbury Academic. ISBN 978-1-3504-1834-9.
