= Frank Lancaster Jones =

Australian sociologist (born 1937)

Frank Lancaster Jones FASSA
- Born: 1937 (age 88–89); Newcastle, New South Wales, Australia

Academic background
- Education: University of Sydney (BA(Honours) 1957); Australian National University (PhD 1962)
- Thesis: The Italian Population of Carlton: A Demographic and Sociological Survey (1962)
- Doctoral advisor: Jerzy Zubrzycki

Academic work
- Discipline: Sociologist
- Sub-discipline: Social inequality, social stratification, social mobility, national identity
- Institutions: Australian National University
- Notable ideas: Featherman-Jones-Hauser (FJH) hypothesis of common social fluidity

Frank Lancaster Jones FASSA (born 1937) is an Australian sociologist specialising in social inequality, social stratification, social mobility, and national identity. He was Head of the Department of Sociology in the Research School of Social Sciences at the Australian National University (1972–2001) and has been the editor (1970–1972) and a co-editor (1990–1993) of the Australian and New Zealand Journal of Sociology (which became the Journal of Sociology). He was elected a Fellow of the Academy of the Social Sciences in Australia in 1974. During his career he played a pioneering role in the establishment and development of sociology in Australia.

== Early life and education ==
Frank Lancaster Jones was born in 1937 in Newcastle, New South Wales. In 1957 he received a Bachelor of Arts with Honours degree in anthropology from the University of Sydney, where he was a lively student. Encouraged by John Arundel Barnes, who at the time was the chair of anthropology at the University of Sydney, Jones moved to the Australian National University. At the Australian National University he worked as a research assistant to Jerzy Zubrzycki and began a Doctor of Philosophy degree in demography under Zubrzycki's supervision. His thesis was on the Italian population of Carlton, a suburb of Melbourne, and in the course of his study he relocated to Melbourne. He received his PhD degree in 1962.

== Career ==
Having been awarded an Australian National University Travelling Fellowship, Jones then spent some time at the London School of Economics. After a year in the United Kingdom, Jones returned to Australia in 1963 and took up an appointment at the newly established Department of Sociology in the Research School of Social Sciences at the Australian National University. He was to spend the rest of his career at the Australian National University. He was appointed Professor of Sociology and Head of the Department of Sociology in 1972, remaining in these positions until his retirement in 2001.

Jones was the editor of the Australian and New Zealand Journal of Sociology (which was to become the Journal of Sociology) between 1970 and 1972. Together with Barry Hindess, he was a co-editor of the same journal between 1990 and 1993. During his career Jones also acted as a consultant to government commissions and programs on a range of issues, including Aboriginal affairs, city development, multiculturalism, and education.

== Research ==
Jones' research has focused on social inequality, social stratification and mobility (especially with regard to occupational and ethnic stratification), and national identity. His research is generally based on the analysis of large-scale, survey data using quantitative research methods.

== Honours ==
Jones was elected a Fellow of the Academy of the Social Sciences in Australia in 1974.

== Selected bibliography ==
=== Social inequality, stratification, and mobility ===
- Featherman, David L.; Jones, F. Lancaster; Hauser, Robert M. (1975). "Assumptions of social mobility research in the U.S.: The case of occupational status". Social Science Research. 4 (4): 329–360. doi:10.1016/0049-089X(75)90002-2.
- Broom, Leonard; Jones, F. Lancaster (1976). Opportunity and Attainment in Australia. Canberra: ANU Press. hdl:1885/114755. ISBN 0-7081-1041-X.
- Jones, F. L.; Davis, Peter (1986). Models of Society: Class, Stratification and Gender in Australia and New Zealand. Sydney: Croom Helm. ISBN 0-949614-22-X.
- Jones, F. L. (1992). "Common social fluidity: A comment on recent criticisms". European Sociological Review. 8 (3): 233–237. doi:10.1093/oxfordjournals.esr.a036639.

=== Occupational status scales ===
- Jones, F. L. (1989). "Occupational prestige in Australia: A new scale". Australian and New Zealand Journal of Sociology. 25 (2): 187–197. doi:10.1177/144078338902500202.
- Jones, F. L.; McMillan, Julie (2001). "Scoring occupational categories for social research: A review of current practice, with Australian examples". Work, Employment & Society. 15 (3): 539–563. doi:10.1017/S0950017001000344.
- McMillan, Julie; Beavis, Adrian; Jones, Frank L. (2009). "The AUSEI06: A new socioeconomic index for Australia". Journal of Sociology. 45 (2): 123–149. doi:10.1177/1440783309103342.

=== Ethnicity and national identity ===
- Broom, Leonard; Jones, F. Lancaster (1973). A Blanket a Year. Canberra: ANU Press. ISBN 0-7081-0094-5.
- Jones, F. L. (1996). "Convergence and divergence in ethnic divorce patterns: A research note". Journal of Marriage and Family. 58 (1): 213–218. doi:10.2307/353389. JSTOR 353389.
- Jones, F. L.; Luijkx, Ruud (1996). "Post-war patterns of intermarriage in Australia: the Mediterranean experience". European Sociological Review. 12 (1): 67–86. doi:10.1093/oxfordjournals.esr.a018178.
- Jones, F. L. (1997). "Ethnic diversity and national identity". Australian and New Zealand Journal of Sociology. 33 (3): 285–305. doi:10.1177/144078339703300302.
- Jones, Frank L.; Smith, Philip (2001). "Diversity and commonality in national identities: An exploratory analysis of cross-national patterns?". Journal of Sociology. 37 (1): 45–63. doi:10.1177/144078301128756193.
- Jones, F. L.; Smith, Philip (2001). "Individual and societal bases of national identity: A comparative multi-level analysis". European Sociological Review. 17 (2): 103–118. doi:10.1093/esr/17.2.103.

=== Decomposing differences between groups ===
- Jones, F. L. (1983). "On decomposing the wage gap: A critical comment on Blinder's method". The Journal of Human Resources. 18 (1): 126–130. doi:10.2307/145660. JSTOR 145660.
- Jones, F. L.; Kelley, Jonathan (1984). "Decomposing differences between groups: A cautionary note on measuring discrimination". Sociological Methods & Research. 12 (3): 323–343. doi:10.1177/0049124184012003004.
