= Scientology (Lewis book) =

2009 book by James R. Lewis

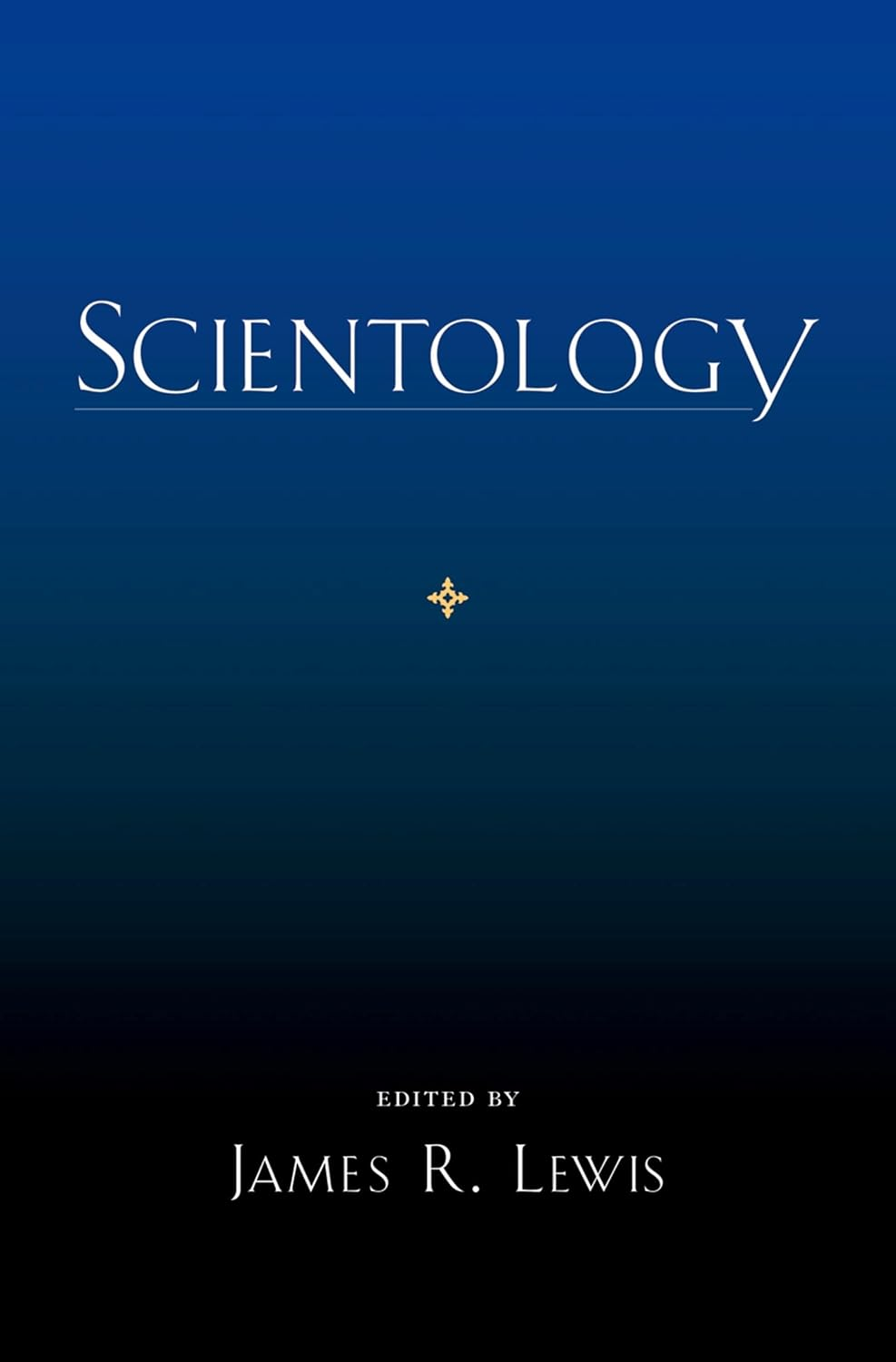
- Book cover
- Author: James R. Lewis
- Language: English
- Subject: Scientology
- Publisher: Oxford University Press
- Publication date: March 2009
- Publication place: United States
- Media type: Print
- Pages: 464
- ISBN: 0-19-533149-4
- OCLC: 232786014
- Dewey Decimal: 299'.936
- LC Class: BP605.S2S29 2009

Scientology is an edited volume about Scientology, and the Church of Scientology organization, published in 2009 by Oxford University Press. It was edited by the sociologist James R. Lewis. Chapters in the work give an overview and introduction to the organization, and present analysis of the movement from the perspective of sociology. The book compares the organization to religious movements, and goes over its history of controversy. It delves into the practices of the organization and the activities undertaken at its facilities.

Scientology received polarized reviews. Some reviewers criticized the book as biased in Scientology's favor to the point of unreliability, criticizing Oxford University Press for its publishing of the book. Other reviewers praised the book for taking a balanced view of criticism of the church, covering previously unstudied aspects of Scientology, and for its comprehensive coverage of a wide variety of topics related to the group.

== Contents ==
The book is organized into seven main parts (discounting the introduction and appendix), each containing several essays. Lewis's introduction notes scholars' reluctance to publish Scientology research, given the organization's reputation as "a litigious organization, ready to sue anyone who dares criticize the Church", and addresses Scientologists' tendency to misunderstand the nature of the academic process. The book is described by the publisher as "the only comprehensive critical source about Scientology".

Part I, "Introductory Essays", presents an overview and introduction to Scientology and the life of its founder. The second part covers "Theoretical and Quantitative Approaches", and examines Scientology's ostensible soteriology as well as the degree to which Scientology can be said to be growing. The third part focuses on the "Community and Practices" of Scientology, while the fourth part, "Sources and Comparative Approaches", examines Scientology's religious claims. Part V is focused on "Controversy", such as Scientology's battles with the anti-cult movement and court cases in different countries concerning Scientology's recognition or lack of recognition as a religion. The sixth part analyzes the organization's activities in its "International Missions", while the seventh examines "Dimensions of Scientology", including a chapter on the Xenu myth.

Various chapters comment on Scientology's growth. Lewis puts forth the assertion that the movement is growing at a "healthy—but not a spectacular—rate" (22 percent over the period from 1990 to 2001, from 45,000 to 55,000 according to an American survey of religious self-identification), and states that contrary to the Church's own claims, it is "clearly not the world's fastest growing". William Sims Bainbridge, a sociologist, asserts that Scientology has experienced growth along the West Coast of the United States. Bainbridge looked at statistical data on the percentage of websites managed by Scientologists, and his studies revealed that the most significant portion was in the Pacific Northwest and the state of California. According to Bainbridge, the experience of Scientology founder L. Ron Hubbard in science fiction writing combined with the Church of Scientology's skill with the "emerging cyberculture" might lead to ways that the organization can change in a future that further utilizes technology. In a section of the book on dealings of the organization in Denmark, researchers found that there was a decrease in the number of people joining the organization, and that the number of dedicated Scientologists in the country remained steady for the past two decades. University of Copenhagen researchers Rie Wallendorf and Peter B. Andersen write that the Church of Scientology in Denmark is wary of those external to the organization, and that this detracts from the likelihood that new members will join.

Charles De Gaulle University researcher Régis Dericquebourg writes that when compared to the Scientology practice of "Auditing", other ceremonies carried out by the organization have more restricted levels of participation. According to Dericquebourg, these Scientology ceremonies include social functions which are frequented mainly by "elite members". University Michel de Montaigne researcher Bernardette Rigal-Cellard investigated the various Scientology missions and determined that these missions operated with a United States-based type of methodology. This form of organizational structure and operational tactics is seen as not working well in areas where the U.S. is not seen favorably, including sections of Western Europe, but agreeable to locations sympathetic to American culture.

== Contributors ==
- Peter B. Andersen
- William Sims Bainbridge
- Henrik Bogdan
- David G. Bromley
- Dorthe Refslund Christensen
- Douglas E. Cowan
- Carole M. Cusack
- Régis Dericquebourg
- Justine Digance
- Frank K. Flinn
- Andreas Grünschloß
- Gail M. Harley
- John Kieffer
- James R. Lewis
- J. Gordon Melton
- Susan J. Palmer
- Adam Possamai
- Alphia Possamai-Inesedy
- James T. Richardson
- Bernadette Rigal-Cellard
- Mikael Rothstein
- Anson Shupe
- Rie Wellendorf
- Gerald Willms

== Publication ==
Scientology was published in March 2009 by Oxford University Press. It is 464 pages long. At the time of the book's publication, editor James R. Lewis was employed as an associate professor of religion at the University of Tromsø in Norway.

== Reception ==
Scientology received polarized reviews. Some reviewers believed the book was unduly sympathetic to Scientology and failed to remain neutral, while other reviewers praised it for its variety and comprehensiveness. Terra Manca, writing in the International Journal of Cultic Studies, criticized the book, describing it as a "poor sourcebook" and "unreliable" for information on Scientology due to "numerous and varied" shortcomings, and that it would however be useful for those studying biased research practices; this criticism was echoed by a review in the magazine Private Eye. Private Eye's review criticized the book for what it perceived as its unusually sympathetic tone and for not mentioning numerous notable controversies surrounding Scientology, as well as the book's presentation of asserted facts regarding the life of Scientology founder L. Ron Hubbard. A review in Choice magazine by G. H. Shriver praised the volume as an "unparalleled book", saying it would "remain for many years the definitive, scholarly work on Scientology." He praised its extensive notes and its neutrality, saying previous works had either been "hypercritical outside" perspectives or apologetics.

"... the most sophisticated academic item published on Scientology so far [...] a serious attempt at bringing together what different fields of cultural studies (not just religious studies) can say about the most controversial of NRMs."

— Marco Frenschkowski, Alternative Spirituality and Religion Review

Protestant theologian and history of religion scholar Marco Frenschkowski, writing in Alternative Spirituality and Religion Review, praised the book, describing it as "the most important collection of articles on Scientology published so far – in any language". Frenschkowski singled out Lewis's introduction and Melton's chapter for praise, describing the latter as finding "a fine balance between critical observations and giving due weight to the point of view of devoted Scientologists [...] This does not mean defending Scientology: it means taking both members and critics seriously." Frenschkowski argued that the diverse array of writers overcame biases typical of cultic studies, while W. Michael Ashcraft, writing for Nova Religio, praised the book for its variety of topics and its scope, writing that the book "eliminate[s] many topics from the list of topics desperately in need of further study". Ashcraft described Shupe's chapter as insightful, and said he thought Grünschloß and Willms' essays were the most "profound" in the book. Shriver said the book covered all important aspects of Scientology, and praised it as an "excellent descriptive overview".

The book's citing of Wikipedia in two chapters was criticized by Manca as an example of what she perceived as the book's poor research practices, and questioned the book's publisher for allowing this. Frenschkowski argued that Rothstein's chapter on the Xenu myth was right to praise "the anonymous Wikipedia article on the subject", a fact that was reflective of "the deeply unsatisfying state of affairs" that to date there had been not a single peer-reviewed journal article covering the topic. He further praised Rothstein's chapter as an "important study", stating that it was a good starting point for future research on the topic; however, he wished Rothstein had contextualized the myth more with Hubbard's other space opera writings, and the science fiction field in general. Ashcraft also praised Rothstein's chapter, which he viewed as being about "the myth surrounding the myth", and "illuminating" in its reading of how the Xenu story was utilized in debates on Scientology. The Private Eye review concluded by criticizing Oxford University Press for publishing the book: "What is utterly mystifying is why one of the oldest and most respected publishing houses in the world chooses to give its imprimatur to this tendentious drivel." When questioned by Private Eye, a spokesman for Oxford University Press responded, "Certainly this book was peer-reviewed." Private Eye joked that the peer reviewers of the book may have been controversial figures Lord Archer and Lord Black.

"... although this book brings needed academic attention to Scientology, its shortfalls are substantial enough to render it as an unreliable source of information about the organization."

— Terra Manca, International Journal of Cultic Studies

The book's lack of coverage of some topics was criticized. Manca criticized the book for failing to include substantive analysis of several aspects within the controversial history of the Scientology organization, including its treatment in some countries; lack of discussion regarding Scientology programs; dearth of coverage regarding use of specialized terminology especially regards suppressive persons and the related practice of disconnection, and failure to cite critical scholarship on the subject matter. Manca argued the authors of chapters within Scientology also failed to seriously analyze material received from primary-sources including Scientology organization representatives: the review asserted this damaged the informational quality of claims that may have disputed Scientology's, and led to biased conclusions. Frenschkowski listed some minor errors in the anthology, said he regretted the absence of a glossary, and was critical of the fact that there were several overlaps between various chapters; however, his main point of criticism was that apart from some new data based on the quantitative sociological approach, the book mainly presented overviews of data already known. Ashcraft wished the book had included more information on the organizational dynamics of Scientology, which he described as the "most glaring gap" in scholarship of the organization.

Towards the end of his review, Frenschkowski recalls the editor's prediction in the introduction, that the book would "likely end up pleasing no one engaged in the Scientology/anti-Scientology conflict, which is perhaps as it should be". Summing up, Frenschkowski states that the book pleased him, at any rate, and that he wished for it to be "read not just by academics but also e.g. by journalists." Manca disputed this, writing that the book "is most likely to please persons who take an uncritical view of Scientology." Richard Cimino, founder and editor of the Religioscope Institute-published newsletter Religion Watch, wrote that the book "focuses less on the church's abuses than on its organizational dynamics and teachings, although its authors do broach controversial issues." Cimino commented that the book is "divided about whether the movement and its distinctive blend of science, psychotherapy and esoteric religion is growing". In an article about Scientology by B.A. Robinson at the website of the organization Ontario Consultants on Religious Tolerance, Scientology is listed as a "recommended book".

=== Lewis's response ===
In an open letter in January 2011, Lewis stated he had reevaluated his opinion on the Church of Scientology, following the defection of a large number of high ranking Scientologists, the sacking of Heber Jentzsch, and what he viewed as unethical ways of raising money. He described the open letter as "not an apology for anything I have written in the past", but that it was to "set forth some of my views on CoS – both academic and personal – in a public way". He noted criticisms that he should have included chapters on ex-Scientologists and the Freezone, describing that as "an appropriate critique", and said he had changed his mind that the organization was undergoing growth. He also stated that the organization, which had "hated the collection, particularly the Xenu chapter", completely stopped communication with him soon after the volume was published, leading him to conclude he had possibly been designated a suppressive person.

== See also ==
- A Piece of Blue Sky
- Bare-faced Messiah
- Scientology and law
- Scientology controversies
