= Bill Martin (sociologist) =

Australian sociologist (1956–2016)

- Born: William Craig Martin; 13 September 1956
- Died: 27 April 2016 (aged 59–60); Brisbane, Queensland, Australia
- Parent(s): A. W. Martin; Jean Martin

Academic background
- Education: University of Wisconsin–Madison
- Thesis: (1988)
- Doctoral advisor: Iván Szelényi; Erik Olin Wright

Academic work
- Discipline: Sociologist
- Institutions: La Trobe University; Flinders University; University of Queensland
- Main interests: The sociology of work and employment

William Craig Martin (13 September 1956 – 27 April 2016) was an Australian sociologist. He was Professor of Sociology at Flinders University and the University of Queensland and was an editor of the Journal of Sociology. His main research interests were in the sociology of work and employment.

== Early life and education ==
Bill Martin was born in 1956 to Jean Isobel Martin (née Craig) and Allan William Martin. Both his parents were academics, Jean a sociologist and Allan a historian. Martin completed a BA (Honours) at the Australian National University in 1977. He undertook a PhD at the University of Wisconsin–Madison under Iván Szelényi and Erik Olin Wright, his degree being conferred in 1988.

== Career ==
Martin returned to Australia to take up a position at La Trobe University. In 1992 he began a 17-year tenure at Flinders University, during which he worked in the Sociology Department and the National Institute of Labour Studies (NILS) and attained the position of Professor of Sociology. In 2009 he took up the position of Professor of Sociology and Program Leader of the Employment and Education research program at the Institute for Social Science Research (ISSR) at the University of Queensland. Martin retired in 2015.

During his career Martin was an editor of the Journal of Sociology and treasurer of The Australian Sociological Association.

== Death ==
Martin died on 27 April 2016, after a short illness.

== Bibliography ==
=== Books ===
- Martin, Bill; Moskos, Megan (2007). Evaluative research project: final report to the Independent Gambling Authority. Adelaide, South Australia: Independent Gambling Authority. ISBN 9781921070204 Pdf.
- Martin, Bill (2007). Skill acquisition and use across the life course current trends, future prospects. Adelaide, South Australia: National Centre for Vocational Education Research (NCVER). Archived from the original on 5 March 2016. ISBN 9781921170379 Pdf.
- Martin, Bill; Healy, Josh (2008). Changing work organisation and skill requirements. Adelaide, South Australia: National Centre for Vocational Education Research (NCVER). Archived from the original on 5 March 2016. ISBN 9781921412189
- Martin, Bill; King, Debra (2008). Who cares for older Australians?: A picture of the residential and community based aged care workforce, 2007 (PDF). Barton, Australian Capital Territory: National Institute of Labour Studies (NILS), Faculty of Social and Behavioural Sciences, Flinders University. ISBN 9781741867671
- Martin, Bill; Healy, Josh (2010). Who works in community services? A profile of Australian workforces in child protection, juvenile justice, disability services and general community services. Brisbane, Queensland, Australia: Community and Disability Services Ministers' Advisory Council (CDSMAC). Pdf.

=== Chapters in books ===
- Martin, Bill (2001), "The changing experience of the middle class", in Dow, Geoff; Parker, Rachel (eds.), Business, work, and community: into the new millennium, South Melbourne, Victoria, Australia New York: Oxford University Press, pp. 217–230, ISBN 9780195513271.
- Martin, Bill; Wajcman, Judy (2004), "Understanding class inequality in Australia", in Devine, Fiona; Waters, Mary C. (eds.), Social inequalities in comparative perspective, Malden, Massachusetts: Blackwell Publishing, pp. 163–190, ISBN 9780631226857.
- Martin, Bill; Pixley, Jocelyn (2005), "How do Australians feel about their work?", in Wilson, Shaun; Meagher, Gabrielle; Gibson, Rachel; Denemark, David; Western, Mark (eds.), Australian social attitudes: the first report, Sydney, New South Wales: University of New South Wales Press, pp. 42–61, ISBN 9780868406718.
- Martin, Bill (2007), "How do Australians feel about their work?", in Wilson, Shaun; Meagher, Gabrielle; Denemark, David; Western, Mark; Phillips, Timothy (eds.), Australian social attitudes 2: citizenship, work and aspirations, Sydney, New South Wales: University of New South Wales Press, ISBN 9780868408613.
- Martin, Bill; King, Debra (2009), "Caring for profit? The impact of for-profit providers on the quality of employment in aged care", in King, Debra; Meagher, Gabrielle (eds.), Paid care in Australia: politics, profits, practices, Sydney, New South Wales: Sydney University Press, pp. 113–143, ISBN 9781920899295.
- Martin, Bill (2011), "Work and employment", in McAllister, Ian; Dorwick, Steve; Hassan, Riaz (eds.), The Cambridge handbook of social sciences in Australia, Cambridge, England: Cambridge University Press, pp. 499–517, ISBN 9781107403444.

=== Journal articles ===
- Martin, Bill; Wajcman, Judy; Riemens, Wendy (December 2000). "Managerial and professional careers in an era of organisational restructuring". Journal of Sociology. 36 (3): 329–344. doi:10.1177/144078330003600304.
- Martin, Bill; Wajcman, Judy (May 2004). "Markets, contingency and preferences: contemporary managers' narrative identities". The Sociological Review. 52 (2): 240–264. doi:10.1111/j.1467-954X.2004.00467.x.
- Martin, Bill; Roach Anleu, Sharyn; Zadoroznyj, Maria (March 2005). "Editors' statement for Journal of Sociology". Journal of Sociology. 41 (1): 5–6. doi:10.1177/1440783305052277.
- Martin, Bill (2007). "Good jobs, bad jobs: understanding the quality of aged care jobs and why it matters". Australian Journal of Social Issues. 42 (2): 183–197. doi:10.1002/j.1839-4655.2007.tb00048.x. hdl:2328/12903. EBSCOhost.
- Martin, Bill; Marks, June; Zadoroznyj, Maria (March 2008). "How Australians order acceptance of recycled water: national baseline data". Journal of Sociology. 44 (1): 83–99. doi:10.1177/1440783307085844.
- Martin, Bill; Healy, Josh (2009). "Changing work organisation and skill requirements". Australian Bulletin of Labour. 35 (2): 393–437. SSRN 1946049. Pdf.
- Martin, Bill (2009). "Skill acquisition and use across the life course: current trends, future prospects". Australian Bulletin of Labour. 35 (1): 393–437. Pdf.
