= Scientology (disambiguation) =

Scientology may refer to:

- Scientology, a body of beliefs and related practices created by L. Ron Hubbard
- Church of Scientology, the organization practicing Scientology

Scientology may also refer to:

- Scientology terminology, as a language
- Scientology: A History of Man, 1952 book by L. Ron Hubbard
- Scientology: The Now Religion, 1970 book by George Malko
- Scientology (James R. Lewis book), 2009 book edited by James R. Lewis
