= Possamai =

Possamai is originally regarded as an Italian surname. In Italian, it means Possa (rests) mai (never), which translates to "Never rests".

It can specifically refer to several people:

- Adam Possamai (born 1970), Belgian-Australian sociologist and writer
- Agnese Possamai, Italian athlete
- Stéphanie Possamaï, a French judoka
