= VOCEDplus =

Free international research database for tertiary education

VOCEDplus is a free international research database about tertiary education, maintained and developed by staff at the c (NCVER) in Adelaide, South Australia. The focus of the database content is the relation of post-compulsory education and training to workforce needs, skills development, and social inclusion.

== Structure ==
The content of the VOCEDplus database encompasses vocational education and training (VET), higher education, lifelong learning, informal learning, VET in schools, adult and community education, apprenticeships/traineeships, international education, providers of education and training, and workforce development. It is international in scope and contains over 84,000 English language records, many with links to full text documents.

VOCEDplus contains extensive Australian materials and includes a wide range of international information, covering outcomes of tertiary education in the shape of published research, practice, policy, and statistics.

Entries are included for the following types of publications: reports; annual reports; papers; discussion papers; occasional papers; working papers; books; book chapters; conference papers; conference proceedings; journals; journal articles; policy documents; published statistics; theses; podcasts; and teaching and training materials.

Each database entry contains standard bibliographic information and an abstract. Many entries include full text access via the publisher's website or a digitised copy.

== History ==
=== 1989-1997 ===
In the early years VOCEDplus was known as VOCED. The original database was produced by a network of clearinghouses across Australia with the aim of sharing activities in the technical and further education (TAFE) sector. VOCED was produced in hardcopy and an electronic version was distributed on diskette.

=== 1997-2001 ===
1997 - the first web version of VOCED was made available from the National Centre for Vocational Education Research (NCVER) organisational website

1998 - a major project to upgrade the database and expand its international coverage commenced

2001 - creation of VOCED's own website

2001 - VOCED endorsed as the UNESCO international database for technical and vocational education and training (TVET) research information

=== 2001-2009 ===
Many changes to the database and website occurred during this period with a focus on continuous improvement to meet the needs of users and utilise emerging technologies.

2006 - materials produced for two adult literacy and learning programs funded by the Australian Department of Education, Employment and Workplace Relations (DEEWR) - the Workplace English Language and Learning (WELL) Programme and the Adult Literacy National Project (ALNP) included in VOCED

2007 - the Australian clearinghouse network transferred most of the hardcopy collections to NCVER, to form a centralised repository of resources

2009 - materials produced by Reframing the Future (RTF) a vocational education and training workforce development initiative of the Australian, State and Territory Governments included in VOCED

=== 2009-2014 ===
A major rebuild of the database and website was undertaken during this period to take advantage of the potential of new technologies to provide improved services and incorporate Web 2.0 technologies (RSS feeds, and share and bookmark tools).

2009 - scope expanded to more fully encompass the higher education sector

2011 - launch of VOCEDplus with the name change representing the enhanced features and extended focus

2012 - a major retrospective digitisation project commenced and by the end of the 2012-2013 financial year a total of 9,328 publications (593,534 pages/microfiche frames) had been digitised, ensuring these publications are available electronically for free

=== 2014-2019 ===
A number of significant curated content products were released during this period.

2015 - release of a refreshed look to adopt the new NCVER branding plus a number of search enhancements (Guided search, Expert search, and Glossary search) were added

2015 - first in the series of 'Focus on...' pages released

2016 - launch of the 'Pod Network', a convenient and efficient platform that allows instant access to research and a multitude of resources on a range of subjects

2017 - completion of the 'Pod Network', consisting of 20 Pods (on broad subjects including Apprenticeships and traineeships, Foundation skills, Teaching and learning, Career development, and Students) and 74 Podlets (on narrow topics including Online learning, Social media, VET in schools, STEM skills, and Adult literacy)

2018 - launch of the 'Timeline of Australian VET Policy Initiatives' and the 'VET Knowledge Bank' which contains a suite of products capturing Australia's diverse, complex and ever-changing VET system

2019 - after an internal review, a refreshed, streamlined version of the 'Pod Network' was released, consisting of 13 Pods and 20 Podlets

2019 - launch of the 'VET Practitioner Resource' which contains a range of information to support VET practitioners in their work and is organised into three sections: (1) Teaching, training and assessment: standards, guidance, research and good practice resources to inform daily work; (2) Practitioners as researchers: information for undertaking practitioner-led research; and (3) The VET workforce: information about VET teachers and trainers, and the professional development needs of the VET workforce

2019 - VOCEDplus celebrated 30 years of providing information to the tertiary education sector and the homepage was refreshed to make it more modern and easier to use

=== 2020- ===
VOCEDplus continued to be accessible throughout the COVID-19 pandemic.

2020-2021 - the VET Knowledge Bank added a dedicated page, 'COVID-19 announcements', that showcases the measures introduced by the Australian, state and territory governments to mitigate the impact of the pandemic and promote economic recovery

2020-2024 - published research about the effects of the pandemic on education and training, providers, students, labour markets, employment and employees was collected and made permanently available in the database

2024 - VOCEDplus celebrated 35 years of providing information to the tertiary education sector. The homepage was refreshed and a number of enhancements and new features were implemented including a new My Profile feature, improvements to My Selection, accessible search history and saved searches, enhanced search functionality, and improved navigation.
