= Self-Injury, Medicine and Society =

2016 book by Amy Chandler

Self-Injury, Medicine and Society: Authentic Bodies
- Authors: Amy Chandler
- Language: English
- Subjects: Sociology
- Publisher: Palgrave Macmillan
- Publication date: 2016
- Media type: Print (hardcover, Paperback)
- Pages: 217
- Awards: Foundation for the Sociology of Health & Illness' Book of the Year Prize (2018)
- ISBN: 978-1349680665

Self-Injury, Medicine and Society: Authentic Bodies is a 2016 book by the sociologist Amy Chandler, published by Palgrave Macmillan. The book won the 2018 Foundation for the Sociology of Health & Illness' Book of the Year Prize at the British Sociological Association's Medical Sociology Group annual conference.

== Description ==
Chandler conducted narrative analysis of interviews and surveys involving people who have self-injured, in addition to her own experiences with self-injury. Through the book, Chandler critiques research that she sees as having individualised the social problems surrounding self-injury and which have depicted self-injuring people as irrational.

== Reception ==
In a review for Journal of Sociology, Rebecca E. Olson wrote that "Chandler's book offers a beautifully written, accessible and thorough exploration of the embodied, and expanding, practices of self-injury in late-modern, western societies". Olson described the book as "thoroughly critical and a pleasure to read" and praised Chandler for "the care she has taken to provide such a nuanced understanding of self-injury".

Paul Stronge, reviewing the book in Sociology of Health & Illness, described Self-Injury, Medicine, and Society as a "very stimulating, meticulously researched and critically insightful book". Stronge praised Chandler for her success "in allowing the voices of self-injurers to take front-stage and the diverse and often highly-nuanced nature of their own perspectives to emerge" through the book. Stronge summarised the book as "a satisfyingly original and provocative monograph".

=== Awards ===
- Foundation for the Sociology of Health & Illness Book of the Year Prize (2018).
