= Alphia Possamai-Inesedy =

Australian sociologist

- Born: Alphia Inesedy
- Occupation: Sociologist

Alphia Possamai-Inesedy is an Australian sociologist who is Director of the Sydney City Campus at the University of Western Sydney. She is the Vice President of the Australian Sociological Association.

== Education ==
In 1999, Possamai-Inesedy received a Bachelor of Arts in Sociology and Psychology. In 2000, she was awarded a first-class honours award in Sociology. In 2005, Possamai-Inesedy received her PhD from the University of Western Sydney. Her thesis was titled Risk within the Confines of Safety: An Analysis of Current Pregnancy and Birthing Practcies of Australian Women.

== Career ==
In 2009, Possamai-Inesedy was co-creator of the Risk Societies Thematic Group, a sub-group of the Australian Sociological Association. Between 2013 and 2016. Possamai-Inesedy was the editor-in-chief of the Journal of Sociology. She is a co-editor for the Religion, Spirituality and Health: A Social Scientific Approach series published by Springer.

Possamai-Inesedy was responsible for the development of the Master of Research at Western Sydney University. In 2014, Possamai-Inesedy appeared on Radio National talking about how factual information is used to win arguments.

== Personal life ==
Possamai-Inesedy is married to fellow academic Adam Possamai.

== Publications ==
- Possamai-Inesedy, A. and Nixon, A. (2019), The Digital Social: Religion and Belief, : Walter de Gruyter 9783110499872.
- Henslin, J., Possamai, A. and Possamai-Inesedy, A. (2014), Sociology, : Pearson 9781442558830.
- Henslin, J., Possamai, A. and Possamai-Inesedy, A. (2010), Sociology: A Down-To-Earth Approach: Pearson 9781442517813.
