= KSW =

KSW may refer to:

- Kansas Southwestern Railway, a defunct United States railroad company
- Kearny Street Workshop, a multidisciplinary arts organization in San Francisco, California
- Keeping Scientology Working, an internal document for Scientologists, written by L. Ron Hubbard
- The King's School, Worcester
- The Kootenay School of Writing, a writers' collective based in Vancouver, Canada
- Konfrontacja Sztuk Walki, a Polish Mixed Martial Arts promotion
- Kiryat Shmona Airport, an airport near Kiryat Shmona, Israel (IATA code: KSW)
- S'gaw Karen language, ISO 639 code ksw
