= Jean Martin (sociologist) =

Australian sociologist (1923–1979)

Jean Martin FASSA
- Born: Jean Isobel Craig; 21 June 1923; Malvern, Victoria, Australia
- Died: 25 September 1979 (aged 56); Mona Vale, New South Wales, Australia
- Education: University of Sydney; Australian National University
- Spouse: A. W. Martin (m. 1955)
- Relatives: Bill Martin (son)

Jean Isobel Martin FASSA (née Craig; 21 June 1923 – 25 September 1979) was an Australian sociologist who was a pioneer of the discipline in Australia. Many of her works examined the role of immigrants in Australian society. Her academic career "spanned teaching and research appointments in seven Australian universities".

== Early life and education ==
Martin was born in Melbourne to Elizabeth (née Alexander) and David Craig. Her father was a civil servant born in Scotland. She grew up in Sydney, attending Abbotsleigh before going on to attend the University of Sydney. She graduated Bachelor of Arts in 1943 and Master of Arts in 1945, studying anthropology under A. P. Elkin; she was awarded the University Medal and won first-class honours. Martin undertook further studies at the London School of Economics and University of Chicago, eventually receiving a Ph.D. from the Australian National University in 1954.

== Academia ==
Martin lectured at the University of Sydney until the birth of her first child, after which she worked part-time and often carried out unpaid research. In 1965, she was appointed as the inaugural professor of sociology at La Trobe University. She resigned due to ill health in 1974, subsequently taking up a senior fellowship in the Research School of Social Sciences at Australian National University.

Martin was a foundation member of the Sociological Association of Australia and New Zealand in 1963 and served as the organisation's president from 1969 to 1971. She served on the social studies committee of the Australian Population and Immigration Council and was a member of the Social Welfare Commission's research advisory committee. She also contributed to several parliamentary inquiries and was a consultant to the 1974 Royal Commission into Human Relationships. In 1971, she was elected as a Fellow of the Academy of the Social Sciences in Australia.

== Works ==
Martin completed her M.A. thesis on dairy farmers in New South Wales and her Ph.D. thesis on refugees in New South Wales; the latter was published in book form as Refugee Settlers (1965). She later published Community and Identity (1972) and The Migrant Presence (1978), studies of refugee groups and societal attitudes towards migrants. Two works were published posthumously – The Ethnic Dimension (1981), a collection of her research papers, and The First Wave (1985), a "longitudinal investigation of Australia's earliest Vietnamese refugees".

== Personal life ==
Martin married the historian Allan W. Martin in 1955; the couple had two sons, including sociologist Bill Martin. She died of cancer in 1979, aged 56. After her death the SAANZ established the Jean Martin Award for the best Australian doctoral thesis in her areas of interest. The Martin Building at La Trobe University is named in honour of Jean and Allan Martin.
