= Judy Wajcman =

British academic

Judy Wajcman FBA FASSA
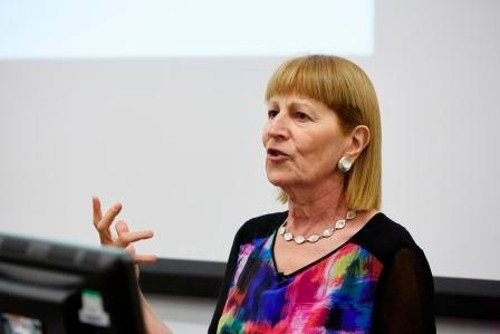

Academic work
- Main interests: Social Studies of Technology Work and Employment Sociology of Time
- Notable works: The Social Shaping of Technology Feminism Confronts Technology TechnoFeminism Pressed for Time
- Website: https://www.lse.ac.uk/people/judy-wajcman

Judy Wajcman (/ˈwaɪzmɛn/ WISE-men), FBA FASSA is the Anthony Giddens Professor of Sociology at the London School of Economics and Political Science. She is the Principal Investigator of the Women in Data Science and AI project at The Alan Turing Institute. She is also a visiting professor at the Oxford Internet Institute. Her scholarly interests encompass the sociology of work, science and technology studies, gender theory, and organizational analysis. Her work has been translated into French, German, Greek, Italian, Korean, Japanese, Portuguese, Russian, Chinese and Spanish. Prior to joining the LSE in 2009, she was a professor of sociology in the Research School of Social Sciences at the Australian National University. She was the first woman to be appointed the Norman Laski Research Fellow (1978–80) at St. John's College, Cambridge. In 1997 she was elected Fellow of the Academy of the Social Sciences in Australia.

Wajcman was President of the Society for the Social Studies of Science (2009–2011), and is the recipient of the William F. Ogburn Career Achievement Award of the American Sociological Association (2013). She received an honorary doctorate from the University of Geneva (2015) and was elected a Fellow of the British Academy (2016). Her book Pressed for Time is the (2017) winner of the Ludwik Fleck prize of the Society for Social Studies of Science. In 2018, she received the Lifetime Achievement Award from the Oxford Internet Institute. In 2021, she was awarded the John Desmond Bernal Prize by the Society for Social Studies of Science.

== Research ==
Wajcman is probably best known for her analysis of the gendered nature of technology. She was an early contributor to the social studies of technology, as well as to studies of gender, work, and organisations.

== Selected bibliography ==
=== Books ===
- Wajcman, Judy (1983). Women in control: dilemmas of a workers co-operative. New York City: St. Martin's Press. ISBN 9780312887377.
- MacKenzie, Donald; Wajcman, Judy (1985). The social shaping of technology: how the refrigerator got its hum. Milton Keynes Philadelphia: Open University Press. ISBN 9780335150267.
- Wajcman, Judy (1991). Feminism confronts technology. University Park, Pennsylvania: Pennsylvania State University Press. ISBN 9780271008028.
- Wajcman, Judy (1998). Managing like a man: women and men in corporate management. University Park, Pennsylvania: Pennsylvania State University Press. ISBN 9780271018485.
- Wajcman, Judy (2004). TechnoFeminism. Cambridge Malden, Massachusetts: Polity. ISBN 9780745630441.
- Edwards, Paul; Wajcman, Judy (2005). The politics of working life. Oxford New York: Oxford University Press. ISBN 9780191556692.
- Hackett, Edward; Amsterdamska, Olga; Lynch, Michael; Wajcman, Judy (2008). The handbook of science and technology studies (3rd ed.). Cambridge, Massachusetts: MIT Press Published in co-operation with the Society for the Social Studies of Science. ISBN 9781435605046.
- Wajcman, Judy (2015). Pressed for time: the acceleration of life in digital capitalism. Chicago: The University of Chicago Press. ISBN 9780226196473.
- Wajcman, Judy; Dodd, Nigel (2017).The sociology of speed: Digital, organizational, and social temporalities. Oxford, United Kingdom Oxford University Press. ISBN 0198782853. OCLC 952384327.

=== Book chapters ===
- Wajcman, Judy (2001), "Gender and technology", in Wright, James D.; Smelser, Neil J.; Baltes, Paul B. (eds.), International encyclopedia of the social & behavioral sciences (volume 9), Amsterdam New York: Elsevier, pp. 5976–5979, ISBN 9780080430768.
- Bittman, Michael; Wajcman, Judy (2004), "The rush hour: the quality of leisure time and gender equity", in Folbre, Nancy; Bittman, Michael (eds.), Family time: the social organization of care, London New York: Routledge, pp. 171–194 ISBN 9780203411650
- Martin, Bill; Wajcman, Judy (2004), "Understanding class inequality in Australia", in Devine, Fiona; Waters, Mary C. (eds.), Social inequalities in comparative perspective, Malden, Massachusetts: Blackwell Publishing, pp. 163–190, ISBN 9780631226857.
- Chesley, Noelle; Sübak, Andra; Wajcman, Judy (2013), "Information and communication technology use and work-life integration", in Major, Debra A.; Burke, Ronald J. (eds.), Handbook of work-life integration of professionals: challenges and opportunities, Cheltenham, UK Massachusetts, USA: Edward Elgar, pp. 245–268, ISBN 9781781009284.
- Frade, Renata & Wajcman, Judy (2023). "Feminism and Technology: an interview with Dr. Judy Wajcman by Renata Frade", in Frade, R. and Vairinhos, Mário (eds), Technofeminism: multi and transdisciplinary contemporary views on women in technology: Aveiro, UA Editora, ISBN 978-972-789-836-7 hdl:10773/37656

=== Journal articles ===
- Wajcman, Judy (June 2000). "Feminism facing industrial relations in Britain". British Journal of Industrial Relations. 38 (2): 183–201. doi:10.1111/1467-8543.00158.
- Wajcman, Judy (June 2000). "Reflections on gender and technology studies: In what state is the art?". Social Studies of Science. 30 (3): 447–464. doi:10.1177/030631200030003005. S2CID 145345073.
- Bittman, Michael; Wajcman, Judy (September 2000). "The rush hour: the character of leisure time and gender equity". Social Forces. 79 (1): 165–189. doi:10.1093/sf/79.1.165.
- Martin, Bill; Riemens, Wendy; Wajcman, Judy (December 2000). "Managerial and professional careers in an era of organisational restructuring". Journal of Sociology. 36 (3): 329–344. doi:10.1177/144078330003600304. S2CID 145639034.
- Martin, Bill; Wajcman, Judy (May 2004). "Markets, contingency and preferences: contemporary managers' narrative identities". The Sociological Review. 52 (2): 240–264. doi:10.1111/j.1467-954X.2004.00467.x. S2CID 145221734.
- Bittman, Michael; Rice, James Mahmud; Wajcman, Judy (September 2004). "Appliances and their impact: the ownership of domestic technology and time spent on household work". British Journal of Sociology. 55 (3): 401–423. doi:10.1111/j.1468-4446.2004.00026.x. hdl:1959.4/34267. PMID 15383094.
- Wajcman, Judy (December 2006). "New connections: social studies of science and technology and studies of work". Work, Employment and Society. 20 (4): 773–786. doi:10.1177/0950017006069814. hdl:1885/29730. S2CID 144285950.
- Wajcman, Judy (March 2008). "Life in the fast lane? Towards a sociology of technology and time". British Journal of Sociology. 59 (1): 59–77. doi:10.1111/j.1468-4446.2007.00182.x. PMID 18321331.
- Wajcman, Judy; Bittman, Michael; Brown, Judith E. (August 2008). "Families without borders: mobile phones, connectedness and work-home divisions". Sociology. 42 (4): 635–652. doi:10.1177/0038038508091620. S2CID 145203012.
- Bittman, Michael; Brown, Judith E.; Wajcman, Judy (December 2009). "The mobile phone, perpetual contact and time pressure". Work, Employment and Society. 23 (4): 673–691. doi:10.1177/0950017009344910. S2CID 153550372.
- Wajcman, Judy (January 2010). "Feminist theories of technology". Cambridge Journal of Economics. 34 (1): 143–152. doi:10.1093/cje/ben057.
- Wajcman, Judy; Rose, Emily (July 2011). "Constant connectivity: rethinking interruptions at work". Organization Studies. 32 (7): 941–961. doi:10.1177/0170840611410829. S2CID 145260573.
- Wajcman, Judy; Jones, Paul K. (September 2012). "Border communication: media sociology and STS". Media, Culture & Society. 34 (6): 673–690. doi:10.1177/0163443712449496. S2CID 143509758.
- Ford, Heather; Wajcman, Judy (2017). "'Anyone can edit', not everyone does: Wikipedia's infrastructure and the gender gap". Social Studies of Science. 47 (4): 511–527. doi:10.1177/0306312717692172. PMID 28791929. S2CID 32835293.
- 'How Silicon Valley sets Time', New Media & Society, Vol. 21(6), 2019, pp. 1272–1289.
- 'The Digital Architecture of Time Management', Science, Technology, & Human Values, Vol. 44, No. 2, 2019, pp. 315–337.
