= Adam Possamai =

Belgian-Australian sociologist (born 1970)

- Born: 1970 (age 55–56); Auvelais, Sambreville, Belgium
- Education: Université Catholique de Louvain; La Trobe University
- Occupations: Sociologist; Novelist
- Known for: Hyper-real Religion; 'I-Zation' of Society
- Scientific career
- Workplaces: Western Sydney University

Adam Possamai FASSA is a Belgian-Australian sociologist and novelist based in Sydney, Australia. He is the Associate Dean (Global, Partnerships and Advancement) of the Faculty of Social Sciences, Arts, Business, and Law at Western Sydney University, the International Secretary for the Academy of Social Sciences in Australia, and a Professor of Sociology. As of 2026, Possamai has authored 18 academic books and over 100 journal articles and book chapters in the field of sociology, along with 6 fiction novels. He is renowned internationally for his work on religion, popular culture, social theory, Australian Aboriginal Peoples, and Muslim laws.

Possamai is a Past President of the Australian Association for the Study of Religion (2003-2005). He was the 2002-2007 co-editor of the Journal for the Academic Study of Religion (then known as the Australian Religion Studies Review) and is the former President of the sociology of religion section (RC22) of the International Sociological Association (2010-2014).

A sociologist of religion, his research has focused on the interrelation between migrants and new religious movements, the impact of consumer and popular culture on religion, contemporary Indigenous religions, Muslim communities in secular societies, and creative works with religious themes.

He is married to sociologist Alphia Possamai-Inesedy, and lives in the south-western suburbs of Sydney with his family.

== Education ==
Possamai's undergraduate studies were undertaken at the Université Catholique de Louvain in Belgium, where he graduated with both a Bachelor of Social Sciences (Hons) and a Graduate Diploma of Education in 1994. He then attained his PhD in Sociology from La Trobe University in 1998 with a dissertation on New Age spirituality. His dissertation was awarded the Jean Martin Award for the best PhD thesis by the Australian Sociological Association the following year.

== Career ==
Possamai began his teaching career as a tutor at La Trobe University in 1995 before receiving an appointment as lecturer in sociology at Western Sydney University (then known as the University of Western Sydney) in 1999.

Since joining Western Sydney University, Possamai has worked as co-director of the Centre for the Contemporary Study of Muslim Societies (2009-2012), director of the WSU Religion and Society Research Centre (2012-2015), as well as Associate Dean of Research and Higher Degree Research (2015-2018). Appointed to full professor in 2014, Possamai worked as the Deputy Dean of the School of Social Sciences at Western Sydney University in 2019 before assuming his current role as Associate Dean (Global, Partnerships and Advancement) in 2026.

He has taught across varied sociological fields including the sociology of religion, sociology of migration, sociological theory, sociology of power and deviance, as well as the philosophy of social sciences. He has supervised more than 20 PhD students, and has chaired the Australian Sociological Association's Jean Martin Award Panel for the best sociology thesis in Australia in 2011, 2013, and 2017. He was also elected a Fellow of the Academy of the Social Sciences in Australia in 2023.

Possamai has been internationally recognised for his contributions to sociology throughout his career. He was a visiting Professor at the Graduate Centre of the City University of New York, United States (2011), the École des Hautes Études en Sciences Sociales in Paris, France (both in 2013 and 2018), and the Summer Institute of Hokkaido University in Sapporo, Japan (2021). He represents Australasia on the Council of the International Society for the Sociology of Religion, having given the keynote address at the Society's 38th Conference in 2021.

Possamai has been the chief investigator for two Australian Research Council Discovery Grants. The first grant project entitled Testing the limits of post-secularism and multiculturalism in Australia and the USA: Shari'a in the everyday life of Muslim communities (2012-2015) investigated the popular understanding of the non-compatibility of Shari’a in late modern Australia. The project also highlighted how Shari’a compliant investment is viewed positively in the finance sector.

The second ARC Discovery grant project involves a collaboration between four Australian universities – Western Sydney University, Curtin University, University of Queensland, and Melbourne University. The project entitled Being a Transnational Muslim in Australia in an Era of Hyper-Security (2022-ongoing) seeks to understand the sense of identity and belonging maintained among Australian Muslims as they negotiate surveillance and hostility in public.

Perles Noires, his first work of fiction, was listed as one of the favourite books by the public libraries in Paris in 2006. His most recent novel, L’énigme, inspired by the painting ‘The Enigma’ by French artist Gustave Doré, was published in 2025.

== Publications ==
=== Non-Fiction Books ===
- Possamai, Adam (2005) In Search of New Age Spiritualities. Ashgate.
- Possamai, Adam (2005) Religion and Popular Culture: A Hyper-Real Testament. Peter Lang.
- Possamai, Adam (2009) Sociology of Religion for Generations X and Y. London: Equinox.
- Henslin, James M.; Possamai, Adam; Possamai-Inesedy, Alphia (2010) Sociology: A Down-To-Earth Approach. Sydney: Pearsons.
- Barbalet, Jack; Possamai, Adam; Turner, Brian S. (eds.) (2011) Religion and the State: A Comparative Sociology. Anthem Press.
- Possamai, Adam (ed.) (2012) Handbook of Hyper-Real Religions. Leiden: Brill.
- Onnudottir, Helena; Possamai, Adam; Turner, Brian S. (2013) Religious Change and Indigenous Peoples: The Making of Religious Identities. Aldershot: Ashgate.
- Possamai, Adam; Richardson, James T.; Turner, Brian S. (eds.) (2014) Legal Pluralism and Shari'a Law. Oxford: Routledge.
- Possamai, Adam; Richardson, James T.; Turner, Brian S. (eds.) (2015) The Sociology of Shari’a: Case Studies from Around the World. Leiden: Springer.
- Cox, James L. & Possamai, Adam (eds.) (2016) Religion and Non-Religion among Australian Aboriginal Peoples. Oxon: Routledge.
- Michel, Patrick; Possamai, Adam; Turner, Brian S. (eds.) (2017) Religions, Nations and Transnationalism in Multiple Modernities. Basingstoke: Palgrave McMillan.
- Possamai, Adam (2018) The i-zation of Society, Religion, and Neoliberal Post-Secularism. Basingstoke: Palgrave McMillan.
- Giordan, Giuseppe & Possamai, Adam (2018) Sociology of Exorcism in Late Modernity. Basingstoke: Palgrave McMillan.
- Giordan, Giuseppe & Possamai, Adam (eds.) (2020) The Social Scientific Study of Exorcism in Christianity. Leiden: Springer.
- Possamai, Adam & Blasi, Anthony J. (eds.) (2020) The Sage Encyclopaedia of the Sociology of Religion. London: Sage.
- Possamai, Adam & Tittensor, David (2022) Religion and Change in Australia. London: Routledge.
- Possamai, Adam & Tittensor, David (eds.) (2025) Muslims in Contemporary Australia. Leiden: Brill.
- Possamai, Adam (2026) Evil: Shortcuts to a Big Idea, London: Routledge.

=== Select Articles ===
As of 2025, Possamai has authored over 70 journal articles in the field of sociology. This is a selection of some of his most highly cited works:

- Possamai, A. (2000) ‘A Profile of New Agers: Social and Spiritual Aspects’ Journal of Sociology 36 (3), 345-358.
- Possamai, A. (2002) ‘Cultural Consumption of History and Popular Culture in Alternative Spiritualities’ Journal of Consumer Culture (2) 2: 197-218.
- Possamai, A. (2003) ‘Alternative Spiritualities and the Cultural Logic of Late Capitalism’ Culture and Religion 4 (1): 31-45.
- Possamai, A. and M. Lee (2011) ‘Hyper-Real Religions: Fear, Anxiety and Late-Modern Religious Innovation’ Journal of Sociology 47 (3): 227-242.
- Possamai, A. and B. Turner (2014) ‘Authority and Liquid Religion in Cyber-space: the new territories of religious communication’ International Social Science Journal 63 (209-210): 197–206.
- Possamai, A. (2015) ‘Popular and Lived Religions’ Current Sociology 63 (6): 781-799.
- Possamai, A. (2017) ‘Post-Secularism in Multiple Modernities’ Journal of Sociology 53 (4), 822-835.

=== Novels ===
- Perles Noires (2006). (First edition with Nuit d'Avril ; third edition with Rivière Blanche Publisher [fr])
- Le XXIème Siècle de Dickerson et Ferra (2012). (First edition with Asgard éditions; third edition as Amarama with Rivière Blanche Publisher [fr])
- Le crépuscule de Torquemada (Tome 1 de la duologie, Les possédés de la Renaissance) (2015). (Riviere Blanche Publisher [fr])
- L’histoire extraordinaire de Baudelaire (2017). (Rivière Blanche Publisher [fr])
- La réflexion de Borgia (Tome 2 de la série, Les possédés de la Renaissance) (2018). (Rivière Blanche Publisher[fr])
- L’énigme (2025). (Riviere Blanche Publisher [fr])

== Contributions to Academia ==
A large portion of Possamai's published work is premised on a neo-Weberian approach to the sociology of religion and popular culture. His contributions to the study of religion and popular culture are acclaimed as significant works. In exploring the manner in which the internet has become a source of religious inspiration (as well as a forum for religious expression), Possamai has discussed the emergence of what he dubs ‘hyper-real religions’. Inspired by the work of Jean Baudrillard, hyper-real religion is an entirely new theoretical framework for conceptualising hybridity and consumerism in religion in the context of globalization. It emphasises the replacement of authoritative external forms of conventional religious authority (such as authority vested in imams, priests, rabbis, or in communally interpreted sacred texts) along with the role of the individual to create new religious messages. Thus hyper-real religions constitute new forms of spirituality where traditional and modern religious ideas are consumed and projected into completely reconstructed forms. Examples cited by Possamai include the Church of All Worlds, the Church of Satan, Matrixism, and Jediism (see also Jedi census phenomenon).

Notions of hyper-real religion have since featured in both news media and on podcasts addressing religion and pop culture including the Sydney Morning Herald and Stuff in 2010, along with the Stuff to Blow Your Mind podcast in 2016, and the Religious Studies Project podcast in 2017. Carole Cusack in her book Invented Religions: Imagination, Fiction and Faith stated that "Adam Possamai,... to date is the only sociologist of religion (indeed the only scholar) to examine it [Jediism] in any detail prior to this study" (p 124). His work also considers the complex interplay between fundamentalist Christian groups that resist the synergy between popular culture and religion (as in the phenomenon of Harry Potter, fantasy-role playing games), and yet reappropriate aspects of pop culture to promote fundamentalism.

Another area of scholarly innovation is found in Possamai's work on New Age spirituality. On the basis of both field research in alternative spirituality festivals and new theoretical approaches, Possamai has contested the scholarly status quo in the interpretation and classification of New Age spirituality. His field research demonstrates that very few practitioners of what scholars call New Age actually accept the term. He argues that the term New Age is imprecise and the previous scholarly conceptualisations of New Age are either limited or misleading. In his new schema, New Age spirituality is but one facet of a much wider cultural phenomenon that he has dubbed a perennist spirituality. It follows that by culturally consuming selected practices, myths, and teachings from pre-modern times, and then reframing them for the contemporary scene, seekers aspire to personal transformation and perhaps resolving global woes.

At the heart of this conceptualisation of reality lies a commitment to what Possamai has dubbed "perennism", the notion that a holistic understanding of truth is accessible in esoteric wisdom or gnosis that is unfettered by the dogmas of the world's religions. According to Possamai, the key features of perennism are that in this syncretic spirituality the cosmos is interpreted as a monistic reality, which partakes of a single unifying being, or principle, and all parts of the cosmos are inter-related to this ultimate reality. Those who participate in this spirituality are engaged in self-development to attain their potential, and they pursue spiritual knowledge of both self and ultimate reality.

More recently, Possamai's 2018 theory of the ‘i-zation’ of society describes a new stage of capitalism whereby rational bureaucracy now permeates our personal biographies. Building on sociologist George Ritzer’s contention that rational bureaucracy permeates everyday social life through the ‘McDonalization’ of society, Possamai contends that ‘i-technology’ applications have allowed for the McDonalization process to intensify further and now dominate our inner, personal lives. As stated by Possamai in 2022 “In i-society, Weber's instrumental rationality has become omnipresent. We have bureaucratised our own selves” (p. 175). This has subsequently obliged religion to become more standardised in line with neoliberal ideology.

== See also ==
- Perennialism
- Self religion
