= Keeping Scientology Working =

Church of Scientology policy letter

Keeping Scientology Working (also known as KSW1) is a document written by Scientology creator L. Ron Hubbard in 1965, and usually referred to within Scientology as a policy. It is frequently described within the Scientology movement as the most important policy in the Church of Scientology. It ostensibly serves as the keystone for every action, and is mandated to be presented as the first document at the beginning of every single course of study in Scientology. The document was reissued in 1970 and again in 1980. It lays out ten points concerning the exact application and preservation of "Standard Tech" in Dianetics and Scientology, and the eradication of "non-standard tech", more commonly referred to in Scientology as "squirreling."

Originally titled "Keeping Scientology Working", it became the name of a series of documents on the subject, with KSW1 being the first and primary document of that series. KSW1 is sometimes abbreviated to just "KSW", as Scientologist Tom Cruise did repeatedly in a Church of Scientology video that was leaked to the press in January 2008. The video, during which Cruise was awarded a medal by the head of the Church of Scientology, showed a prepared interview with Cruise as he talked on the subject of keeping Scientology working.

== Content ==
The ten points of Keeping Scientology Working are:

1. "Having the correct technology", which Hubbard asserts has already been achieved;
2. "Knowing the technology", which he claims many within Scientology have also achieved;
3. "Knowing it is correct"; Hubbard says this comes from application and observation;
4. "Teaching correctly the correct technology"; Hubbard claims this is done worldwide throughout Scientology;
5. "Applying the technology", which Hubbard also says is already happening;
6. "Seeing that the technology is correctly applied"; Hubbard states that instructors and supervisors do this already;
7. "Hammering out of existence incorrect technology" is the first problem area according to Hubbard, which he calls a "weak point" only handled by a few.
8. "Knocking out incorrect applications", which Hubbard says is not worked on hard enough;
9. "Closing the door on any possibility of incorrect technology"; Hubbard says this is "impeded by the 'reasonable' attitude of the not quite bright";
10. "Closing the door on incorrect application"; Hubbard says this is "seldom done with enough ferocity."

The ten directives Hubbard listed in the 1965 policy letter, when considered as a whole, "seek to ensure the proper and continued application of Scientology "standard tech" along with the eradication of anything counter to it," according to Scientology in Popular Culture: Influences and Struggles for Legitimacy.

Hubbard claims that the main stumbling blocks he listed all pertain to "incorrect technologies" and "incorrect applications" listed in the last four items. He claims that the reasons for the problems with the last four items are due to poor certainty that the "technology" works, people with low IQs, people trying to "defend themselves against anything they confront", and "the bank" (Scientology jargon which basically refers to the "reactive mind" that supposedly contains negative memories), which defends itself by trying to "knock out the good and perpetuate the bad."

Hubbard states, "I know what a group of people will do and how insane they will go in accepting unworkable 'technology'. By actual record the percentages are about twenty to 100,000 that a group of human beings will dream up bad technology to destroy good technology." He also states, "See that Seven, Eight, Nine and Ten above are ruthlessly followed and we will never be stopped. Relax them, get reasonable about it and we will perish." The remainder of the document is further justifications for why "incorrect technologies and applications" have to be ruthlessly hammered out of existence to keep Scientology working, including one example where Hubbard claims that a failure to do this for one student of Scientology meant that "his wife died of cancer resulting from physical abuse."

In Janet Reitman's Inside Scientology, she quotes Hubbard: "Never let anyone be half-minded about being Scientologists," he wrote in Keeping Scientology Working. "When somebody enrolls, consider he or she has joined for the duration of the universe – never permit an 'open-minded approach'."

According to scholar Shannon Trosper Schorey, KSW "was a statement of the re-assertion of official church control over the proliferation of adaptations and interpretations of church practice." At the core of KSW is "the mandate that Scientology technology must at all times be practiced in consonance with official Church of Scientology guidelines."

The document ends with a caution that Scientology is a "deadly serious activity" and that everyone's futures for the next trillions of years depends on it. (Note: "We're not playing some minor game in Scientology. It isn't cute or something to do for lack of something better. The whole agonized future of this planet, every Man, Woman and Child on it, and your own destiny for the next endless trillions of years depend on what you do here and now with and in Scientology. This is a deadly serious activity. And if we miss getting out of the trap now, we may never again have another chance. Remember, this is our first chance to do so in all the endless trillions of years of the past. Don't muff it now because it seems unpleasant or unsocial to do Seven, Eight, Nine and Ten. Do them and we'll win.")

== Criticism ==
=== Germany ===
The German Federal Office for the Protection of the Constitution has cited this passage as one of its reasons for designating Scientology an organization opposed to the democratic order.

In a section on KSW point 4 "teaching correctly the correct technology" Hubbard states:

The most trouble in the past two years came from orgs (organisations) where an executive in each could not assimilate straight Scientology. Under instruction in Scientology they were unable to define terms or demonstrate examples of principles... When we instruct half-mindedly and are afraid to offend, scared to enforce, we don't make students into good Scientologists... The proper instruction attitude is, "You're here so you're a Scientologist. Now we're going to make you into an expert auditor no matter what happens. We'd rather have you dead than incapable."

This last sentence has been cited in a report by the state government of Baden-Württemberg as evidence that Scientology represents a totalitarian ideology.
