= Beryl Rawson =

Australian academic (1933–2010)

Beryl Rawson FAHA
- Born: Beryl Marie Wilkinson; 24 July 1933; Innisfail, Queensland, Australia
- Died: 22 October 2010 (aged 77)
- Spouses: Don Rawson; A. W. Martin (m. 1983–2002)

Academic background
- Education: University of Queensland; Bryn Mawr College
- Doctoral advisor: Lily Ross Taylor

Academic work
- Discipline: Classics
- Institutions: Australian National University

Beryl Rawson FAHA (née Wilkinson; 24 July 1933 – 22 October 2010) was an Australian academic. She was Professor and Visiting Fellow in Classics at the Faculty of Arts of the Australian National University (ANU). Her work "made ANU a significant centre for classical studies".

== Early life and education ==
Rawson was born in Innisfail, Queensland, and grew up in a small town nearby where her father was the schoolteacher. She won a full state government scholarship to the University of Queensland, where she excelled in classics and graduated with first-class honours. She accepted a Fulbright Scholarship to the United States and completed a doctorate at Bryn Mawr College, under Lily Ross Taylor.

== Academia ==
Her career at the Australian National University began in 1964, when she was appointed senior lecturer in classics. She served as Dean of the Faculty of the Arts from 1981 to 1986 and in 1989 was appointed Professor of Classics, retiring in 1998.

As well as her academic duties, Rawson won five research grants between 1979 and 1991 and served on the Australian Vice-Chancellors' Committee and the Australian Research Council. She was elected a Fellow of the Australian Academy of the Humanities in 2006. The administrative offices of the College of Arts and Social Sciences at ANU was named after her following her death.

On 13 December 2010, Vice-Chancellor of ANU, Professor Ian Chubb officially recognised the naming of the Beryl Rawson Building in her honour.

== Publications ==
In the late 1970s she began using computers to analyse "the mass of funerary inscriptions commemorating slaves and freedmen, their spouses and children" and to better understand the lives of the lower classes in the early Roman Empire. She organised a number of conferences in Canberra on the Roman family (1981, 1988, 1994) and published collected papers resulting from these which included her own contributions, such as Children and childhood in Roman Italy (2003) and A companion to families in the Greek and Roman worlds (2010).

== Personal life ==
Rawson's first marriage was to political scientist Don Rawson, the son of politician Roy Rawson. They later divorced and she remarried in 1983 to historian A. W. Martin. She was widowed in 2002.
