= A. W. Martin =

Australian historian

A. W. Martin AM FASSA FAHA
- Born: Allan William Martin; 1926
- Died: 2002 (aged 75–76); Canberra, Australia
- Education: University of Sydney; Australian National University
- Spouses: Jean Craig (m. 1955–1979) Beryl Rawson (m. 1983)
- Relatives: Bill Martin (son)

Allan William Martin AM FASSA FAHA (1926–2002) was an Australian historian. He wrote numerous works on Australian political history.

== Early life and education ==
Martin served in the Royal Australian Air Force during World War II, and subsequently entered the University of Sydney to study education. He worked as a schoolteacher for a period, but later returned to university to complete a Master of Arts in history. He entered the newly established Australian National University (ANU) as the first doctoral student in the Research School of the Social Sciences; he completed his PhD in 1955. His doctoral thesis, supervised by Laurie Fitzhardinge and Robin Gollan, examined the political history of New South Wales in the 19th century.

== Academia ==
After completing his doctorate, Martin lectured at the University of New South Wales. He was appointed senior lecturer at the University of Melbourne in 1959 and reader in history at the University of Adelaide in 1965, under Professor Hugh Stretton. In 1966, Martin became the foundation professor of history at La Trobe University. He established the university's history department and also served as dean of humanities (1970–1971). In 1973, he returned to Canberra to accept a senior fellowship at ANU, allowing to devote more of his time to research and writing.

== Works ==
Martin is best known for his biographies of Australian statesmen Henry Parkes and Robert Menzies. Henry Parkes: A Biography was published in 1980, and won the 1981 Barbara Ramsden Award from the Fellowship of Australian Writers. Robert Menzies: A Life was published in two volumes, the first released in 1993 and the second in 1999. Writing for The Canberra Times, Jeffrey Grey found the first volume to be "an immensely readable and marvellously scholarly book". Two other books were byproducts of his research on Parkes and Menzies, examining their personal letters and diaries. Martin also co-authored books about the emergence of the Australian party system and a biographical register of New South Wales parliamentarians. He wrote eight entries in the Australian Dictionary of Biography.

== Personal life ==
Martin married sociologist Jean Craig in 1955. She was also a foundation professor at La Trobe. The couple had two sons, including academic Bill Martin. He was widowed in 1979 and remarried in 1983 to classicist Beryl Rawson.

Martin was elected Fellow of the Academy of the Social Sciences in Australia (FASSA) in 1967, Fellow of the Australian Academy of the Humanities (FAHA) in 1983, and appointed Member of the Order of Australia (AM) in 1998. After his death the Allan Martin Award was established by the Australian Historical Association, to be awarded to early-career historians.
