= The Enigma (Doré) =

Painting by Gustave Doré

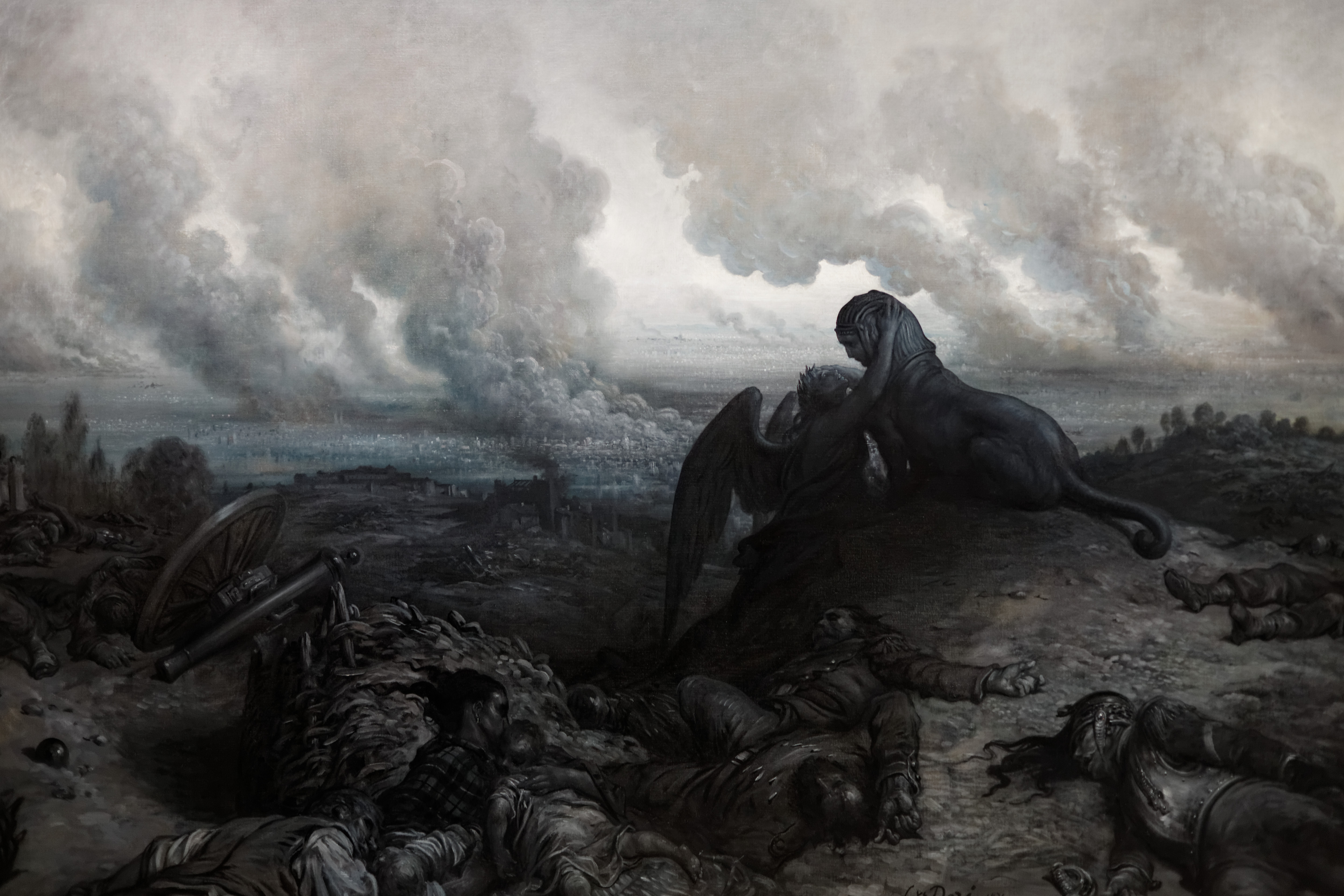
- Artist: Gustave Doré
- Year: 1871
- Medium: Oil on canvas
- Dimensions: 130 cm × 195.5 cm (51 in × 77.0 in)
- Location: Musée d'Orsay, Paris

The Enigma is an oil-on-canvas painting executed in 1871 by French artist Gustave Doré. It is held in the Musée d'Orsay, in Paris.

== History and description ==
The painting was created in 1871, in the aftermath of the French defeat at the Franco-Prussian War and the Paris Commune, and it testifies to his dark historical context. Doré was from Strasbourg, and as such felt deeply the loss of Alsace–Lorraine to Germany. At first sight, the painting surprises with its uniform and almost monochrome appearance, which underlines an atmosphere of desolation and death, with corpses on a battlefield and burning cities on the horizon. At the left, there is an abandoned cannon, while the corpse of a mother clutches her dead child, with a dead civilian by her side, possibly her husband. Two corpses of dead soldiers lie at her right. The classic elements of the representation of war are present in this depiction. Another dead soldier is seen at the right, and the legs of another one are behind him.

The two central figures have a strong symbolism, and with their presence the work tries to reach the unspeakable: a winged figure, possibly representing the angel of Humanity, or perhaps Consciousness, is on his knees before the Sphinx, begging her to reveal the reason for the eternal enigma which causes conflict and war between men. They stare at each other, while holding each others head and talking, both with a poignant look.

== Legacy ==
In 1884, the painting was exhibited at the posthumous sale of the artist's works, with two similarly themed canvases The Black Eagle of Prussia and The Defense of Paris, all three under the common title Souvenirs de 1870. During the sale of the painter's works, it was accompanied by two verses by Victor Hugo, excerpts from his poem "At the Arc de Triomphe" from Les Voix Interieures (1837), chosen by Doré himself: "What a spectacle! Thus dies everything that man creates!/ A past such as this is a deep abyss for the soul!"

The painting was bought by the Louvre in 1982, and since the same year it has been in the collection of the Musée d'Orsay, also in Paris.
