= Jerzy Zubrzycki =

Australian sociologist

Jerzy "George" B. Zubrzycki AO CBE MBE (Military) (12 January 1920 – 20 May 2009) was a Polish-born Australian sociologist, widely regarded as the "Father of Australian Multiculturalism".

== Life ==
Zubrzycki was born in Kraków, Poland. He escaped from Nazi rule in World War II, and joined the Free Polish forces in the United Kingdom. For his services there he was made a Member of the Order of the British Empire (Military Division) by the UK Government.

In 1956 he was appointed to a post at the Australian National University in Canberra, Australia, where he remained for the rest of his life.

He chaired the Australian Ethnic Affairs Council 1977–81, served on the council of the Institute of Multicultural Affairs 1980–86, and on the interim council of the National Museum of Australia. He travelled widely with members of the Fraser government to help explain their multiculturalism policies.

He was a member of the Pontifical Academy of Social Sciences, and he was also honoured by Poland and the United States. Jerzy Zubrzycki was also the first president of the Australian Institute of Polish Affairs, an independent, non-profit organisation and think tank committed to advancing knowledge about Poland in Australia and fostering stronger Polish-Australian relations across political, economic, cultural, and social domains. aipa.net.au

He died in Canberra on 20 May 2009, aged 89.

A biography of Jerzy Zubrzycki, The Promise of Diversity, by John B H Williams and John Bond, was published by Grosvenor Books Australia in 2013.It was launched at an AIPA event by Malcolm Fraser, the former Australian PM. It was translated into Polish and published in Warsaw in 2016.

== Honours ==
In 1967 Zubrzycki was elected Fellow of the Academy of the Social Sciences in Australia. For his work promoting multiculturalism in Australia, Zubrzycki was appointed a Commander of the Order of the British Empire (CBE) in 1978, and an Officer of the Order of Australia (AO) in 1984.

== Bibliography ==
- Polish immigrants in Britain : a study of adjustment. The Hague: Nijhoff. 1956.
- Immigrants in Australia : a demographic survey based upon the 1954 Census. 1960.
- Immigrants in Australia : Statistical supplement. 1960.
- Settlers of the Latrobe Valley. Canberra: The Australian National University. 1964.
- "Edward Shils – a personal memoir". Quadrant. 40 (1–2): 61–63. January–February 1996.
