= Glossary of Scientology =

This glossary presents Scientology terms which are used in Wikipedia or encountered regularly in media.

== A ==
auditing

A counseling style of activity between two Scientologists (an auditor and a preclear), usually involving the e-meter device.

auditing session

The period of time during which one person is auditing another person. It might be for a few minutes or a few hours. Abbreviated 'session'.

auditor

The person operating an e-meter while asking questions of another Scientologist (called the preclear).

== B ==
Basic books

Dozens of Scientology and Dianetics books which are considered to be the core texts for all Scientology members. The 2007 release of the "Basic books and lectures" was part of the Golden Age of Knowledge. See Golden Age of Knowledge for more details.

blow

An unauthorized departure, such as leaving staff or the Sea Org or failing to return to course.

blow drill

A rapid deployment of personnel to search for, and recover, a staff member who has blown.

Bridge

The Bridge to Total Freedom (the Bridge) is also known as the Classification, Gradation and Awareness Chart. It is Scientology's primary action plan and road map to guide a person through the sequential steps to attain Scientology's concept of spiritual freedom.

== C ==
case

The collection of all the preclear's upsets and emotional baggage which auditing is trying to relieve.

case level

A preclear's case level is how far a preclear has advanced on the Bridge.

checksheet

A written series of steps a student must take to work through and complete a course.

Church of Scientology

The conglomeration of corporations created by L. Ron Hubbard for Scientology. Abbreviated "the Church" or "COS". (Note: Use of "Church" or "the Church" is a common shortened form of "Church of Scientology"; see The Church (Scientology).)

Classification, Gradation and Awareness Chart

See Bridge.

clear

1. To clear someone means to audit them in order to remove their reactive mind.
2. The state of clear is the condition when someone no longer has a reactive mind.
3. A person is called a clear when they have achieved the state of clear.

CMO

Common abbreviation for Commodore's Messenger Organization.

comm course

Short for "communications course". The early name for a course teaching the training routines, also known as "comm course drills". Later, the name of the beginner's course teaching a light form of training routines to newcomers. Also called "TR course".

comm ev

Abbreviation for committee of evidence.

committee of evidence

A tribunal style of disciplinary procedure for serious offences. Abbreviated 'comm ev'.

course

A series of steps to learn an aspect of Scientology, written out in sequence on a checksheet. Involves reading and listening to Hubbard writings and lectures, practicing and drilling techniques, and being examined to ensure understanding. If a person is on course they are either actually in a courseroom right now, or they are enrolled on a course and routinely keep a schedule to be in the courseroom doing training.

== D ==
dead agenting

Providing negative information or propaganda about an enemy or critic. A dead agent pack or package is a compilation of documents designed to defame or ruin the reputation of an opponent. Used to discredit someone who has spoken out against Scientology, or held as "insurance" to deter someone from speaking out.

dead filed

Status of a Scientologist who communicated to the Church of Scientology in a nasty or harassing way. They are removed from mailing lists, and their letters and calls are discarded and not answered.

declared

Status of someone formally labelled a suppressive person and expelled from the Church of Scientology.

dev-t

Abbreviation of "developed traffic" which means communication in a business that is disruptive because it is not routed properly. Used as slang to mean any waste of time and effort, usually that is caused by someone.

Dianetics

Created in 1950 by L. Ron Hubbard as a layman's mental therapy, and later incorporated into Scientology and further expanded. Abbreviated Dn.

disconnection

The severing of ties between a Scientologist in good standing and one who has been declared a suppressive person.

Dn

Abbreviation for Dianetics.

dynamics

The drive for survival in life, divided into 8 subsections.

== E ==
E-Meter

Electronic device used as a tool in auditing. It is short for electropsychometer.

end phenomenon

Abbreviated "EP", it is what an auditor is looking for that indicates a process, session or rundown has been completed. The EP of a process might be that the preclear realizes something, is happy about it, and the e-meter is showing certain needle movements. The EP of a session might be that several processes have been performed, and the preclear is very happy about it so it is a good point to stop for the day. A rundown would have a specific EP, such as all auditing questions for the rundown have been asked, and the preclear has experienced some sort of realization such as saying they feel they could now communicate freely with anyone on any subject.

EO

Abbreviation for ethics officer.

EP

Abbreviation for end phenomenon.

ethics

See ethics and justice codes.

ethics and justice codes

Codified rules and procedures for morals, ethics, and production. Ethics represents rules for an individual, and procedures for keeping oneself ethical. Justice represents punishment the group imposes on an individual for violations of the ethics codes.

ethics officer

Staff member who is responsible to ensure all staff and members are correctly following procedures. Abbreviated EO. Compare master at arms.

ethics report

Any one a number of reports written by a Scientologist and sent to the ethics officer.

== F ==
fair game

Retaliatory harassment against critics.

fixed donation

The fixed price of a service at a Church of Scientology. Phrased as "donation" to represent its status as a charitable deduction for income tax purposes in the US. The term does not connote a suggested donation; it is used in place of fee or price.

floating needle

One of the needle actions of an E-Meter during auditing. It is described as "a rhythmic sweep of the dial at a slow, even pace...back and forth." It signifies a good point to end an auditing session, and the auditor tells the preclear, "your needle is floating". Abbreviated F/N.

franchise

A franchise, now called a mission, was a privately owned business which audited people for money, paid 10% of their income to Scientology management as a fee, and sent their clients to the Churches of Scientology for higher level services. Prior to 1982 there were over 400 franchise owners, but in 1982 David Miscavige and his International Finance Police gutted the franchise network, seizing franchise bank accounts and declaring suppressive most of the franchise owners. By 1983 there were just 40 franchises remaining, now renamed as missions but operating as franchises paying 15% of their income as a fee.

freeloader bill

If a Scientology staff member or Sea Org member breaks their contract and leaves staff, they are presented with a bill for all auditing and training services they received while on staff. In order to get back in good standing they must repay the bill.

Freewinds

Scientology's cruise ship. The only location where Scientologists can do the OT VIII level.

== G ==
grade chart

See Bridge.

Galactic Confederacy
1. According to the origin myth from secret level OT III, it was a confederation of 76 planets, ruled over by evil dictator Xenu seventy-five million years ago.
2. According to the OT VIII documents related to the "Second Coming": metaphorical "forces of enlightenment" (Lucifer).
3. From the Dianetics and Scientology Technical Dictionary: "GALACTIC CONFEDERACY, the former political unit of which the solar system was a part. (L. Ron Hubbard Definition Notes)"
Compare Marcab Confederacy.
Gold Base

Alternative name for Int Base because it is the location of Golden Era Productions.

Golden Age of Knowledge

In 2007, David Miscavige announced the release of new "basic books and lectures" as part of the "Golden Age of Knowledge". Every Scientologist was required to purchase, or repurchase, a complete set of these materials. More materials continued to be released over the following years, including translations in many languages, with Miscavige alleging that the new materials were the result of decades of research for editor errors and meticulous transcribing of Hubbard's thousands of audio-recorded lectures, resulting in numerous changes and repackaging of written and audio materials. Then came the hard sell pressures on all Scientologists, and strict sales quotas mandated for all staff members. The costs for each member has been thousands of dollars or euros, and hundreds of hours retaking courses — demoralizing, since the Church told them that everything they had read and learned before was likely incorrect.

Golden Era Productions

The audio visual production arm of Scientology, located at Int Base. It is where they make Scientology films, reproduce audio recordings of Hubbard's lectures, and assemble E-meters.

== H ==
HGB

Abbreviation for Hollywood Guaranty Building.

high crime

A serious infraction under the ethics and justice codes.

Hole

The Hole is a detention building at Int Base that confined executives in the mid-2000s.

Hubbard, L. Ron

The founder of Scientology and Dianetics. Abbreviated LRH.

== I ==
in-ethics

The state when you are producing well, and are not in trouble with the group.

Int Base

A 500-acre heavily guarded compound in California where Sea Org members live and work. Named "Int" because since 1979 it has housed all of the international management organizations and personnel. Used interchangeably with Gold Base.

intensive

An "intensive" is a block of 12 1/2 hours purchased in advance by the preclear for auditing services. Auditing is to occur intensively so that the 12 1/2 hours is performed within one week. At the end of each session, the hours and minutes used are written down on a form in the preclear's folder, deducted from the amount on account, and the balance is calculated.

== J ==
justice

See ethics and justice codes.

== K ==
Keeping Scientology Working

The name of the #1 senior policy from Hubbard declaring that "Scientology is a deadly serious activity upon which the fate of all mankind depends" while all other activities and beliefs are a dangerous distraction. Abbreviated KSW, KSW1 and KSW #1.

knowledge report

One of the types of ethics reports written by a Scientologist and sent to the ethics officer. Abbreviated KR.

KR

Abbreviation for knowledge report.

KSW

Abbreviation for Keeping Scientology Working.

== L ==
L. Ron Hubbard

The founder of Scientology and Dianetics. Abbreviated LRH.

LRH

Abbreviation for L. Ron Hubbard.

== M ==
MAA

Abbreviation for master at arms.

Marcab Confederacy
1. According to OT VIII, they're planning to return in the future to telepathically enslave everyone.
2. From the Dianetics and Scientology Technical Dictionary: MARCAB CONFEDERACY, various planets united into a very vast civilization which has come forward up through the last 200,000 years, is formed out of the fragments of earlier civilizations. In the last 10,000 years they have gone on with a sort of decadent kicked-in-the-head civilization that contains automobiles, business suits, fedora hats, telephones, spaceships. A civilization which looks almost exact duplicate but is worse off than the current U.S. civilization. (Saint Hill Special Briefing Course tape # 291 of 6 August 1963)
Compare Galactic Confederacy.
master at arms

The Sea Org equivalent of an ethics officer. Abbreviated MAA.

Miscavige, David

Since the death of L. Ron Hubbard, David Miscavige has been the leader of the Church of Scientology.

mission

See franchise.

missionaire

A Sea Org member temporarily designated as an authorized emissary and sent to another organization to accomplish a specific task.

== N ==
Narconon

Scientology techniques marketed since 1966 as a secular residential drug treatment program. It consists primarily of the Purification Rundown and TRs & Objectives (a level on the Bridge).

== O ==
Operating Thetan

A state achieved through Scientology auditing and above the level of clear on the Bridge. It is alleged to be a transcendental or supranatural state where a person has achieved "total freedom, complete knowingness, the meaning of life and death, and the meaning of the universe".

org board

Organizational chart showing divisions, departments, posts and their functions.

OT III

Also OT3 or the Wall of Fire. The level where the Xenu story is revealed.

OT levels

Levels on the Bridge above the level of clear.

OT VIII

Also OT8. The highest level on the Bridge, only available on the ship Freewinds. After completing the level, a person is alleged to have gained the abilities of "cause over life", essentially able to will things to happen.

out-ethics

The state when you are unproductive, or are in trouble with the group.

out-tech

When Scientology techniques are being misapplied.

== P ==
para-Scientology
A short-lived term Hubbard used in the 1950s into which he lumped all not-so-believable aspects of Scientology.
PC

Abbreviation for preclear.

potential trouble source

Status of someone connected to a suppressive person, or who is sick. May not receive auditing until they remedy this status. Abbreviated PTS.

preclear

The person getting auditing. Abbreviated PC.

process

A specific step in auditing. It may consist of repeatedly asking the preclear the same question (an auditing command) until there is no more upset on that question. Many processes are run during a single session.

PTS

Abbreviation for potential trouble source.

== R ==
reactive mind

A stimulus-response portion of the mind, not under a person's control, which exerts commands on the person.

Rehabilitation Project Force

More commonly referred to as "the RPF". A re-education camp consisting primarily of manual labor, lack of sleep, inadequate food and medical care, deprivation, humiliation, and isolation.

Ron

First name of L. Ron Hubbard. Was commonly used in normal speech by early Scientologists during Hubbard's lifetime; later Scientologists tended to use the term LRH. Used still in the snowclone phrase "What would Ron do?"

Rondroid

From Ron + "android". Coined as a derogatory term for a Scientologist, indicating those with android-type characteristics such as blind obedience to Church of Scientology mandates, those who appear to have emotionless staring behaviors as learned by training routines, or those thought to have been brainwashed or hypnotized by auditing.

RPF

Abbreviation and preferred usage for Rehabilitation Project Force.

rundown

A series of processes designed to handle a specific aspect of a case, such as communication, problems, or happiness. It may take many sessions to complete a rundown.

== S ==
Scientologist

1. One who practices Scientology.
2. A member of the Church of Scientology.

Scientologist in good standing

A Scientologist who is not in trouble with the Church of Scientology, and who is permitted to be on the premises and to receive services.

Scientology

A set of beliefs and practices founded by L. Ron Hubbard in 1952.

Sea Org

The top level of staff in the Church of Scientology network. Operates like a paramilitary organization. The Church of Scientology describes it as a "religious order made up of the most dedicated Scientologists in the world". Sea Org members sign billion-year contracts.

sec check

Abbreviation for security check.

security check

Interrogations using an E-meter. Abbreviated 'sec check'.

service

The two main services at a Church of Scientology are auditing and training.

session

Abbreviation for auditing session.

SP

Abbreviation for suppressive person.

squirrel, squirreling
In Scientology jargon, "squirreling" refers to altering, reinterpreting, or practicing L. Ron Hubbard's "technology" outside the authority of the Church of Scientology. Hubbard used the term pejoratively for those who applied Scientology methods in an unauthorized or non-standard fashion, likening such deviation to seemingly frantic squirrel-like behavior. The Church characterizes such practices as illegitimate and potentially harmful, and applies the label "squirrel" to Independent Scientologists and members of the Free Zone. Comparable to heretic and heresy in other religious traditions.
staff

Those who work for Church of Scientology organizations.

Standard Tech

Techniques and procedures when applied correctly and standardly.

statistic

Abbreviated "stat" or "stats". The measure of production. Staff members are expected to produce more each week than the previous week, and stats are recorded and charted to measure their progress.

suppressive person

1. A person who has committed high crimes and who has been expelled from the Church of Scientology.
2. Someone considered evil, or an enemy of the Church of Scientology.
Abbreviated SP.

== T ==
Teegeeack

Earth, according to Hubbard's origin myth from OT III.

theta

Life force, spirit, soul, thought.

thetan

One's immortal element; spirit; being.

things that shouldn't be

One of the types of ethics reports written by a Scientologist and sent to the ethics officer. Abbreviated TTSB.

training

Courses of instruction in Scientology.

training routines

Exercises or drills to teach someone aspects of communication, command and control of other people, and other skills required of a Scientologist. Also called comm course drills, training drills and training regimen. Abbreviated "TRs"; pronounced tee-arz.

TTSB

Abbreviation for things that shouldn't be.

== W ==
wog

The word "wog" is derogatorily used by Scientologists to refer to unenlightened non-Scientologists. In 1953, L. Ron Hubbard started using the offensive British racial slur "wog" while wrongly asserting it was politely used during British Imperialism to refer to the locals and was short for "worthy oriental gentleman". In 1966, Hubbard further defined his use of "wog" in a lecture as "a common, ordinary, run-of-the-mill, garden-variety humanoid ... It's simply that he is a body – he is a body. When you get way downhill, you get a person who is a body; he isn't there as a spirit at all. ... He doesn't know he's there, you see?"

== X ==
Xenu

Also spelled Xemu. According to the origin myth from secret level OT III, Xenu was an evil dictator of the Galactic Confederacy seventy-five million years ago who captured and transported billions of people to Earth, dumped them in volcanos, and blew them up.

== See also ==
- Scientology terminology
- Scientology symbols
