= European Sociological Review =

- Discipline: Sociology
- Language: English
- Edited by: Fabrizio Bernardi

Publication details
- History: 1985-present
- Publisher: Oxford University Press
- Frequency: Bimonthly
- Impact factor: 4.099 (2021)

Standard abbreviations
- ISO 4: Eur. Sociol. Rev.

Indexing
- ISSN: 0266-7215 (print); 1468-2672 (web)
- LCCN: 88652006
- OCLC no.: 51206462

Links
- Journal homepage; Online archive

European Sociological Review is a bimonthly peer-reviewed academic journal published by Oxford University Press focusing on all sociology fields. It is the official journal of the European Consortium for Sociological Research. The editor-in-chief is Fabrizio Bernardi (National University of Distance Education). The journal was published three times per year from 1985 to 1997; quarterly from 1998 to 2002; and five times per year from 2003 to 2008.

== Abstracting and indexing ==
This journal is abstracted and indexed by:

- Current Contents/Social and Behavioral Sciences
- Social Sciences Citation Index
- CSA Worldwide Political Science Abstracts
- Scopus
