= National Centre for Vocational Education Research =

The National Centre for Vocational Education Research (NCVER) is an Australian non-profit that promotes research on the vocational education and training (VET) sector in Australia, and acts as a funding body for research in that field.

The organisation was established in 1980 as TAFE National Centre for Research and Development, registered in South Australia in 1981, and took on the current name in 1991/1992.
