= Scientology terminology =

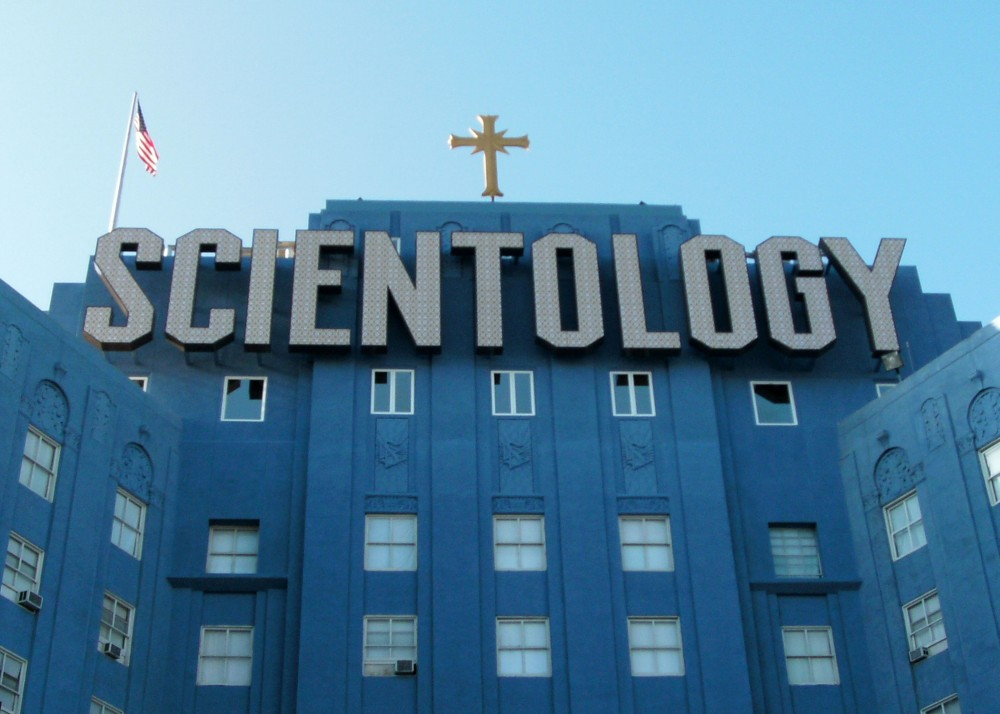
The Church of Scientology building in Los Angeles.

Scientology terminology consists of a complex assortment of jargon used by Scientologists in conjunction with the practice of Scientology and in their everyday lives. It is difficult if not impossible to understand Scientology without understanding its terminology the way Hubbard defines it.

L. Ron Hubbard, the founder of the Church of Scientology, created a large number of jargon terms or Scientologese to refer to various concepts in Scientology and the related practice of Dianetics. By the time he died in 1986, he had devised a thicket of language or nomenclature by means of which one and all are indoctrinated in Scientology religious lore.

Hubbard's Scientology terminology consists of two types of terms:

- Existing terms given an additional Scientology definition. For instance, the word valence has various existing meanings in chemistry, linguistics, psychology and mathematics, generally referring to the capacity or value of something. Hubbard redefines it to mean "an identity complete with bank mass or mental image picture mass of somebody other than the identity selected by oneself."
- Hubbard invented many wholly new terms, such as thetan to refer to his conception of a spiritual being.

Scientology terminology is defined in Dianetics and Scientology Technical Dictionary and Modern Management Technology Defined, colloquially known as the "tech dictionary" and the "admin dictionary". Between them, the two volumes reportedly define over 3,000 Scientology terms in over 1,100 pages of definitions.

The language amongst Scientologists is so thick with esoteric terms, that court cases involving Scientology sometimes need to hire expert witnesses, such as Claire Headley, to help the jury understand the evidence.

== Objectives and usage ==
Hubbard explained the purpose of creating new terms in the foreword to the Dianetics and Scientology Technical Dictionary:

Philosophy has always had the liability of gathering to itself a great many new words and labels. The reason for this is that the philosopher finds phenomena in the physical universe or in the mind or humanities which have not hitherto been observed or properly identified. Each one of these tends to require a new word for its description. In fact this cycle of new observations requiring new labels is probably the growth of language itself. Language is obviously the product of unsung observers who then popularized a word to describe what had been observed.

The system which has been followed in Dianetics and Scientology in labeling phenomena or observed things was originally to make verbs into nouns or vice versa. The practice of developing new nomenclature was actually held to a minimum. However, it was found that many old words in the field of philosophy, when used, conveyed to people an entirely new idea. The exactness of Dianetics and Scientology required a more precise approach. This approach was achieved by special naming with an eye to minimal confusion with already supposed or known phenomena.

The early approach is apparent in Hubbard's use of the suffix "-ness" to turn arbitrary concepts into qualities: "havingness," "livingness," "reelingness," "as-is-ness."

Hubbard's terminology is used so thoroughly in Scientology as to render many church materials incomprehensible under a standard English reading using only an English dictionary as reference. Scientologists will study hard to learn all this terminology, since one of Hubbard's teachings is that "...the only reason a person gives up a study or becomes confused or unable to learn is because he or she has gone past a word that was not understood." It is also used extensively in offshoots of Scientology, such as the Narconon drug rehabilitation program or the Applied Scholastics education program. Scientologists often use Scientology terminology in non-Scientology contexts as well, such as in social or office situations. This can actually wreak havoc when a member of the public hears the word "communication" coming from a Scientologist and he thinks he understands what "communication" means, but the word "communication" in Scientology is a highly "technical" term which has very little to do with what is generally considered communication. "Communication" is not the only word that has a special meaning in Scientology but it is the most important one. There are other words such as "technology", "administration", "logic", "ethics", "control", etc. that have a specially unique meaning in Scientology.

Some critics of Scientology, such as Bent Corydon, assert that the use of loaded language is a manipulation tool, for example Hubbard's rule that criticizing Scientology means you have hidden crimes against Scientology. Psychiatrist Robert Jay Lifton defines "loaded language" as a technique used in brainwashing. The structured language places more requirements on the student to learn concepts and words, shifting responsibility away from the top administration and the creator of Scientology as well as inhibiting the student's own personal power of choice in thinking since he cannot make his own personal interpretations of the meaning. Only Hubbard's meaning is valid. Period! So the indoctrination boils down to: "Do what Ron says!"

== Scientology nomenclature ==
Nomenclature begins in Dianetics where Hubbard uses basic English and some adjectives as nouns to obviate the necessity of having to explain the old to understand the new. With the exception of the biological definition of the word engram, which differs from the commonly accepted medical definition, most terms used in the book Dianetics: The Modern Science of Mental Health do not have existing meanings in English.

The word "percept" exists in the English language but the word "perceptic" seems to be unique to Scientology as in the Super Power Rundown of "Perceptics", a series of procedures designed to enhance a person's ability to perceive as a spiritual being while exterior to the physical body (O.B.E.).

When developing the nomenclature of Scientology, Hubbard tended to use the same words used by the general public e. g. "affinity", "reality". "communication", "knowledge", responsibility", "control", etc., with a new definition and a meaning which is peculiar and exclusively Scientology.

The British philosopher and logician Bertrand Russell asserts, "...provided our use of words is consistent it matters little how we define them." However, L. Susan Stebbing declares, "...but the use of a word already familiar in a certain sense to express a sense different from its original meaning and liable to be confused with it is apt to lead to unfortunate consequences. It is difficult not to slip back to the original meaning, and thus to perplex oneself and others with apparent paradoxes, and even to fall into obvious falsities."

== See also ==
- Glossary of Scientology
