= Journal of Sociology =

- Discipline: Sociology
- Language: English
- Edited by: Ashley Barnwell and Signe Ravn

Publication details
- History: 1965-present
- Publisher: SAGE Publications on behalf of The Australian Sociological Association (Australia)
- Frequency: Quarterly
- Impact factor: 3.0 (2026)

Standard abbreviations
- ISO 4: J. Sociol.

Indexing
- ISSN: 1440-7833 (print); 1741-2978 (web)
- LCCN: sn98031957
- OCLC no.: 38994786

Links
- Journal homepage; Current Issue

The Journal of Sociology is a quarterly peer-reviewed academic journal covering sociology with a focus on Australia. The journal's editors-in-chief are Associate Professors Ashley Barnwell (University of Melbourne) and Signe Ravn (University of Melbourne). It was established in 1965 and is published by SAGE Publications on behalf of The Australian Sociological Association.

== Abstracting and indexing ==
The journal is abstracted and indexed in Scopus and the Social Sciences Citation Index. According to the Journal Citation Reports, its 2026 impact factor is 3.0 and is ranked 30 out of 222 journals in the "Sociology" category.
