= The Australian Sociological Association =

The Australian Sociological Association (TASA) is the peak professional body representing sociologists in Australia. It was founded in 1963 as the Sociological Association of Australia and New Zealand (SAANZ). Following the separation of the New Zealand branch in 1988, the organisation adopted its current name, The Australian Sociological Association (TASA).

TASA organises an annual national conference and publishes the Journal of Sociology, first established in 1965 (originally titled the Australian and New Zealand Journal of Sociology). The association plays a central role in advancing sociological research, teaching, and public engagement in Australia. Membership numbered approximately 400 in the early 1990s and had grown to nearly 740 by 2022.

== History ==
The formation of TASA marked the culmination of a long process in the institutional development of sociology in Australia. Early sociological teaching emerged from Workers’ Education Association tutorials from 1914, hosted by universities including Melbourne, Sydney, Adelaide, and Tasmania. While these initiatives did not immediately result in dedicated sociology departments, they provided an important foundation for the discipline’s later growth.

Australia’s first sociology journal, Social Horizons, appeared in 1942. The Australian National University established the country’s first sociology department in 1950, followed by the first standalone sociology department at the University of New South Wales in 1959. By the early 1960s, additional departments had been created at several universities, coinciding with the establishment of SAANZ in 1963. W. D. (Mick) Borrie served as the association’s first president.

The Australian and New Zealand Journal of Sociology was launched soon after, with its first volume published in 1965. During the 1960s and 1970s, sociology expanded rapidly across Australian universities, and SAANZ developed specialist sections, including Medical Sociology (1968), Teachers (1970), and Women’s Sociology (1976). The association’s newsletter, later titled Nexus, was first published in 1979.

In 1988, the New Zealand membership separated to form the Sociological Association of Aotearoa New Zealand. The remaining Australian members formally established TASA in 1989 under the presidency of John Western, adopting a new constitution and consolidating the association’s national identity.

From the 1990s onward, TASA expanded its professional activities. In 1991, the Annual Review of the Health Social Sciences was established, later renamed the Health Sociology Review. In 1996, TASA launched its website and electronic newsletter and introduced the Distinguished Service to Australian Sociology Award.

== Activities ==
TASA hosts an annual conference, typically held in late November, organised around a central theme. Recent conference themes have addressed social change, wellbeing, public policy, and activism.

The association supports scholarly collaboration through thematic groups and, from 2025, Career Stage Groups, designed to support members at different stages of their academic and professional careers. These include student, early-career, mid-career, senior, and retired sociologists.

Since the COVID-19 pandemic, TASA has also maintained a regular program of public webinars showcasing sociological research and professional development topics.

== Career groups ==
TASA's Executive introduced Career Stage Groups (CSGs) in 2025 (20 years after the first Thematic Groups were launched). The CSGs are designed to facilitate communication and collaboration between TASA members at similar career stages irrespective of the areas they are studying and working in. Supporting the career journey of TASA members is an important goal of the association.
