= Governmental lists of cults and sects =

The application of the labels "cults" or "sects" to (for example) religious movements in government documents usually signifies the popular and negative use of the term "cult" in English and a functionally similar use of words translated as "sect" in several European languages. Government reports which have used these words include ones from Austria, Belgium, China, France, Germany, and Russia. While these documents utilize similar terminology they do not necessarily include the same groups nor is their assessment of these groups based on agreed criteria. Other governments and world bodies also report on new religious movements but do not use these terms to describe them.

== Austria ==
The Austrian government does not always distinguish sects in Austria as a separate group. Rather, religious groups are divided into three legal categories: officially recognized religious societies, religious confessional communities, and associations. In 2010, the most recent year for which sects were officially distinguished in Austria, the groups included the Church of Scientology, the Divine Light Mission, Eckankar, Hare Krishna, Osho movement, Sahaja Yoga, Sathya Sai Baba, Sri Chinmoy, Transcendental Meditation, Fiat Lux, Universal Life, and The Family International.

== China ==
The General Office of the Ministry of Public Security of the People's Republic of China maintains a list of 14 xiéjiào (邪教, lit. 'heterodox teachings'), detailed in a 2000 report entitled "Notice of the Ministry of Public Security on Several Issues Concerning the Identification and Banning of Cult Organizations". The first seven groups on the list were organizations identified by the Central Committee of the Chinese Communist Party and the State Council, while the second group of seven organizations were identified directly by the ministry. All groups included are considered illegal in mainland China, and are subject to prosecution under Chinese law.

Organizations identified by the Central Committee and the State Council

1. "The Shouters" (Chinese: 呼喊派; pinyin: hūhǎn pài), a Christian movement broadly defined as organizations founded or inspired by Witness Lee, banned in 1983 and classified as xiéjiào since 1995.
2. Mentuhui (门徒会; méntú huì), a Christian movement founded by Ji Sanbao, classified since 1995.
3. All Ranges Church (全范围教会; quán fànwéi jiàohuì), a Christian house church organization founded by Peter Xu, classified since 1995.
4. Spirit Church (China), identified as the "Lingling Sect" (灵灵教; líng líng jiào), a Christian sect founded by Hua Xuehe, classified since 1995.
5. New Testament Church (新约教会; xīn yuē jiàohuì), founded by Hong Kong actress Mui Yee and based in Hong Kong and Taiwan, classified since 1995.
6. Guanyin Famen (观音法门; guānyīn fǎmén), also organized as Yuan Dun Famen (圆顿法门; yuán dùn fǎmén), a sect of Mahayana Buddhism founded by Ching Hai, currently organized as a cybersect, classified since 1995.
7. Zhushenjiao (主神教; zhǔshén jiào), founded by Liu Jiaguo (a former member of the Shouters and Beili Wang) in 1993, classified since 1998.

Organizations identified by the Ministry of Public Security

8. Beili Wang (被立王; bèi lì wáng), founded by Wu Yangming (a former member of the Shouters), defined by the Ministry of Public Security as a cult organization in 1995.
9. Unification Church (统一教; tǒngyī jiào), known as "The Moonies" in the US, founded by Korean-American Sun Myung Moon in Busan in 1954, defined by the ministry as a cult in 1997.
10. Sanban Puren Pai (三班仆人派; sān bān púrén pài), a Christian sect founded by Xu Wenku in the 1990s, defined by the ministry as a cult in 1999.
11. True Buddha School, identified as the "Lingxian Zhenfozong" (灵仙真佛宗; líng xiān zhēn fú zōng), a Buddhist sect founded by Chinese-American Lu Sheng-yen in Taiwan, defined by the ministry as a cult in 1995.
12. The Family International, identified as "Children of God" (天父的儿女; tiān fù de érnǚ), founded in the US in 1968 by David Berg, in China since 1980 and asked to leave by the ministry in 1985, defined by the ministry as a cult in 1995.
13. Dami Mission (达米宣教会; dá mǐ xuānjiào huì), a Christian sect founded in South Korea by Lee Jang Rim, in China since 1992 and defined by the ministry as a cult in 1995.
14. "Elijah Ten Commandments Stone Kingdom", identified as "World Elijah Gospel Mission Church" (世界以利亚福音宣教会; shìjiè yǐ lì yǎ fúyīn xuānjiào huì), founded by Korean Park Myungho in 1980 and attempted to form an autonomous zone called "Stone Country", defined by the ministry as a cult in 1996.

Some banned groups classified as xiéjiào were not included in the 2000 list. These include Falun Gong (法轮功; fǎlúngōng), Zhong Gong (中功; zhōng gōng), and The Church of Almighty God (全能神教会), also known as Eastern Lightning (东方闪电).

== France ==
=== French parliamentary commission report (1995) ===
In 1995, a parliamentary commission of the National Assembly of France on cults produced its report (in French: compare an unofficial English translation). The report included a list of purported cults based upon information which may have been provided by former members, the general information division of the French National Police (Renseignements généraux — the French secret police service) and cult-watching groups.

The criteria chosen by the French Renseignements généraux to establish the potential dangers of a movement were criticized since they were considered vague and may include many organizations, religious or not. One of the first criticisms came from bishop Jean Vernette, the national secretary of the French episcopate to the study of cults and new religious movements, who stressed that these criteria can be applied to almost all religions. Moreover, sociologists such as Bruno Étienne emphasized that the mental manipulation should not be defined by the policemen of the Renseignements généraux. The list of cults was based on the criteria defined by the Renseignements généraux, but without specifying which of their practices are specifically criticized. In addition, the secrecy of the work made by the RG led to questions about the presence or absence of certain organizations in the list. Étienne questioned the presence of the CEDIPAC SA company, formerly known as European Grouping of Marketing Professionals (GEPM), as its activity is not in the religious field. The absence of Opus Dei or the Freemasons also raised questions. In 2007, Yves Bertrand, General Director of the Renseignements généraux from 1992 to 2003, spoke about his collaborative work with the parliamentary reports on cults, and said: "Alongside genuine and dangerous cults practicing removal of school, abuse of weakness or pedophilia, some groups have been a bit quickly dress up of the word cult". Furthermore, on 27 May 2005, the 1995 list of cults of the French report was officially cancelled and invalidated by Jean-Pierre Raffarin's circulaire.

In France, Antoinism was classified as a cult in the 1995 parliamentary reports which considered it one of the oldest healer groups. However, in a 1984 letter, the French Minister of the Interior wrote that the movement was considered, from an administrative point of view, as having for exclusive purpose the exercise of a religion, thus complying with the 18th and 19th Articles of the 1905 French law on the Separation of the Churches and the State. He added that Antoinism had always been allowed to receive bequests or donations, which meant that its religious nature was never challenged. In addition, many anti-cults activists, associations or watchers said they had not noticed cultic deviances in this group. For example, when heard by the Belgian commission on cults, philosopher Luc Nefontaine said that "the establishment of a directory of cult movements (...) seems to him dangerous, because it would also give a bad image of quite honourable organizations such as (...) Antoinism". Eric Brasseur, director of Centre for information and advice on harmful cultish organizations (Centre d'information et d'avis sur les organisations sectaires nuisibles, or CIAOSN) said: "This is a Belgian worship for which we have never had a complaint in 12 years, a rare case to report". Similarly, in 2013, the Interministerial Mission for Monitoring and Combatting Cultic Deviances (Mission interministérielle de vigilance et de lutte contre les dérives sectaires, or MIVILUDES) made this comment: "We have never received reporting from Antoinists. They heal through prayer, but as long as they do not prevent people from getting proper treatment by legal means..." In addition, the Renseignements généraux stopped monitoring the religion given the absence of any problem. In 2002, the national service "Pastoral, sects and new beliefs" ("Pastorale, sectes et nouvelles croyances"), which analyses new religious movements from a Catholic point of view, wrote about Antoinism: "Although listed among the cults in the 1995 Parliamentary Report, it has no cultish feature." Similarly, the French sociologist Régis Dericquebourg, who deeply studied the religion, concluded that Antoinism is not a cult: it "has no totalitarian influence on its members, and do not dictate their behaviour to get in the world; it is not exclusive [and] shows no hostility towards social systems".

In France, the 1995 parliamentary report listed the Shri Ram Chandra Mission. This has been criticized by lawyer Lawrence Hincker, who said that "this system of meditation, called Sahaj Marg, does not lead to a life away from the world. It integrates all aspects of man, whether physical, mental or spiritual, without charge or austerity or penance or self-negation". According to the sociologist Bruno Étienne, an expert on religious issues, the SRCM publishes books as any other group but does not proselytize, and has never been convicted: "To us, it is fully a NMR (new religious movement), modern religious group, although based on an ancient tradition, and subject to serious arguments advanced by others more knowledgeable, we do not understand why it is criticized on the list of the damned". Raphaël Liogier, Director of the Observatory of religious and university professor at the Institut d'Études Politiques in Aix-en-Provence, said he did not understand the inclusion on the cult list of an association that is fully recognized in India.

In May 2005 the then Prime Minister of France, in a circulaire, which stressed that the government must exercise vigilance concerning the cult phenomenon, said that the list of movements attached to the Parliamentary Report of 1995 had become less pertinent, based on the observation that many small groups had formed: scattered, more mobile, and less-easily identifiable, and that the government needed to balance its concern with cults with respect for public freedoms and laïcité (secularism).

=== French parliamentary commission report (1999) ===
The French Parliamentary report of 1999 on cults and money concentrated its attention on some 30 groups which it judged as major players in respect of their financial influence. It underlined the non-exhaustive character of its investigations, seeing them as a snapshot at a point in time and based on information available.

The groups examined included:

- Anthroposophie (Anthroposophy)
- Au Cœur de la Communication (At the Heart of Communication)
- Contre-réforme catholique (League for Catholic Counter-Reformation)
- Dianova (Ex-Le Patriarche) (Dianova (formerly: the Patriarch))
- Église du Christ (Boston Church of Christ)
- Église Néo-apostolique (New Apostolic Church)
- Énergo-Chromo-Kinèse (ECK)
- Fédération d'agrément des réseaux (ex-Groupement européen des professionnels du marketing) (Federation of the networks of agreement (formerly: European Grouping of Marketing Professionals (GEPM)))
- Fraternité blanche universelle (Universal White Brotherhood)
- Invitation à la Vie (Invitation to Life)
- Innergy (Insight Seminars)
- Krishna (Hare Krishna movement)
- Landmark (Landmark Education)
- Mahikari (Sûkyô Mahikari)
- Mandarom
- Méthode Avatar (Avatar Method)
- Moon (Unification Church)
- Mouvement du Graal (Grail Movement)
- Mouvement Raëlien (Raelian Movement)
- Nouvelle Acropole (New Acropolis)
- Office culturel de Cluny (Cultural office of Cluny – National Federation of Total Animation)
- Ogyen Kunzang Chöling
- Orkos (Anopsology)
- Pentecôte de Besançon (Evangelical Pentecostal Church of Besançon)
- Prima Verba
- Rose-Croix - AMORC (Rosicrucian Order)
- Rose-Croix d'Or (Gold Rosicrucian Brotherhood)
- Scientologie (Scientology)
- Soka Gakkaï (Sōka Gakkai)
- La méthode Silva (The Silva Method)
- Témoins de Jéhovah (Jehovah's Witnesses)
- Tradition Famille Propriété (Tradition, Family, Property)

== Germany ==
=== Berlin Senate report (1997) ===
An official report of a Senate Committee of the city and state of Berlin in Germany listed and discussed cults (German: Sekten), emphasizing with its sub-title their categorization as "entities espousing a world view and new religions". The 1997 Berlin Senate report — entitled Cults: Risks and Side-effects: Information on selected new religious and world-view espousing Movements and Psycho-offerings — subdivided "selected suppliers" (ausgewählte Anbieter) of its objects of interest as:

- 7.1: Groups with a Christian background (Gruppen mit christlichem Hintergrund)
  - 7.1.1 Fiat Lux
  - 7.1.2 Parish on the Road Evangelical Free Church (registered association) (Gemeinde auf dem Weg Evangelische Freikirche e.V)
  - 7.1.3 Parish of Jesus Christ (registered association) Boston Church of Christ (Gemeinde Jesu Christi e.V. (Boston Church of Christ))
  - 7.1.4 Universal Life (Re-gathering of Jesus Christ) (Universelles Leben (Heimholungswerk Jesu Christi/HHW))
  - 7.1.5 Unification Church (Moon movement) (Vereinigungskirche (Mond-Bewegung))
- 7.2 Groups with a pagan background (Gruppen mit heidnischem Hintergrund)
  - 7.2.1 Teutonic Belief Association (registered association) (Germanische Glaubengemeinschaft e.V. (GGG))
  - 7.2.2 Pagan Association (registered association) (Heidnische Gemeinschaft e.V. (HG))
  - 7.3.2 OSHO-Movement (Osho) (OSHO-Bewegung (Bhagwan))
  - 7.3.3 Ruhani Satsang of Thakar Singh (Ruhani Satsang des Thakar Singh)
  - 7.3.4 Transcendental Meditation (TM) (Transzendentale Meditation (TM))
- 7.4 Suppliers of Life-Help (Anbieter von Lebenshilfe)
  - commercial: (kommerziell:)
  - 7.4.1 The Circle of Friends of Bruno Gröning (Bruno Gröning-Freundeskreise)
  - 7.4.2 Context Seminar Company Limited (Kontext Seminar GmbH)
  - 7.4.3 Landmark Education (LE) (Landmark Education (LE))
  - 7.4.4 Art Reade
  - 7.4.5 Scientology
  - 7.4.6 The Natale Institute (TNI)
  - non-commercial: (nicht kommerziell:)
  - 7.4.7 Union for the Enhancement of the psychological Knowledge of Mankind (Verein zur Förderung der psychologischen Menschenkenntnis (VPM))
- 7.5 Occultism/Satanism (Okkultismus/Satanismus)
- 7.6 So-called Multi-level Marketers (Sogenannte Strukturvertriebe)

== Russia ==
In 2008 the Russian Interior Ministry prepared a list of "extremist groups". At the top of the list appeared Islamic groups outside of "traditional Islam", which is supervised by the Russian government. Next listed were "Pagan cults".

In 2009 the Russian Ministry of Justice set up a council which it named "Council of Experts Conducting State Religious Studies Expert Analysis". The new council listed 80 large sects which it considered potentially dangerous to Russian society, and mentioned that there were thousands of smaller ones. Large sects listed included: The Church of Jesus Christ of Latter-day Saints, Jehovah's Witnesses, and what the council called "neo-Pentecostals".

== See also ==
- Anti-cult movement
- Cult
- New religious movement
- List of new religious movements
