= European Grouping of Marketing Professionals =

Shuttered pyramid scheme

Groupement Européen des Professionnels du Marketing
- Industry: Multi-level marketing
- Founded: 1988; 38 years ago
- Founder: Jean Godzich aka John GODZICH
- Defunct: 1995
- Fate: Classified as a cult
- Headquarters: France

The European Grouping of Marketing Professionals, widely named GEPM then renamed CEDIPAC SA, was a multi-level marketing company founded in the U.S. in 1988 by Jean Godzich, a former member of Amway. In France, its headquarters were in Fleury-sur-Andelle, Eure and it employed approximately 360 employees and 50,000 distributors in France. In 1995, its activities ended and it changed its name after many complaints by former members who presented it as a cult, as well as two parliamentary reports.

== Doctrine and organization ==
The GEPM, also called "the Business" by Godzich's followers, proposed a series of various daily life products, and seminars, rallies, travels, etc., and asked to recruit new members by canvassing, promising the wealth to the followers. The doctrine developed by Godzich mixed marketing techniques, biblical verses, and esotericism. Several statuses could be reached by members, including 'ambassador', 'excellency', and 'diamond'.

In 1995, the GEPM founded Le Groupement, a French professional team of cycling in 1995. Luc Leblanc, Ronan Pensec, Pascal Lino, and Graeme Obree were among its adherents.

== Reception ==
According to some journalistic articles, the GEPM was connected to the First Assembly of God Church, deemed a far-right evangelist church, directed in the U.S. by Godzich's brother, and many distributors of the GEPM were baptized in this church. In addition, excessive demands for money and the huge time devoted to the GEPM, it was deemed harmful to member's family life and led to numerous complaints to the Institut national de la Consommation and to anti-cult associations (UNADFI, CCMM, Secticide). The group was placed in receivership in 1995.

The group was classified as cult in the 1995 and 1999 reports established by the Parliamentary Commission on Cults in France (under the name CEDIPAC SA, its new name then, then under Federation of the networks agreement [Fédération d'agrément des réseaux or FAR], a group founded by former members). It was labelled as "evangelical" cult. Sociologist Bruno Étienne criticized this classification, as the group's activity mainly consists in multi-level marketing. The CCMM, as well as Jean Vernette, then national secretary of French episcopate for the study of cults and new religious movements, also considered this qualification as irrelevant.

On June, the 22nd 1997, at the Zénith, Paris, crowded by more than 6000 distributors, the Federation of networks agreement (Fédération d'agrément des réseaux or FAR), created by former GEPM members (Jean-Claude Martini, Gilbert Husson, André-Pierre Alexandre, Thierry Vavasseur,...) officially launches the new "Direct Distribution Franchise" AKEO which will be taken over by the new company NOAO created by André-Pierre Alexandre in 2001.

In 2007, Godzich was condemned of three-year prison and 500,000-euro fine, for abuse of social goods.
