= Energo-Chromo-Kinese =

Esoteric-oriented movement founded in 1987

- Abbreviation: ECK
- Formation: October 1987
- Founder: Patrick Véret
- Type: New religious movement
- Location: Originally Villefranche-sur-Mer, France
- Region served: France, Switzerland, Spain, Italy, Canada, United States, Portugal, Australia

Energo-Chromo-Kinese, also named ECK, is a pseudo-scientific and esoteric-oriented new religious movement founded in October 1987 in Villefranche-sur-Mer by Patrick Véret, a former acupuncturist.

== History and organization ==
ECK uses many associations and societies (including Connaissance ontologique universelle et recherche biologique énergétique (COURBE), Energo 8 international, Energo conseils, Jéricho 3000, Association pour la recherche en médecine énergétique and SOS Spasmophilie) and is particularly active in the therapeutic and medical fields. Centers and schools were subsequently established to teach the beliefs of the group, which won over business executives and major corporations, but especially doctors, dentists and kinesiotherapists. Customers who attend these four-degree courses become "kinergists". The doctrine is a "gnostic pantheism" and is explained in two books written by Patrick Véret: La Médecine énergétique and La spasmophilie enfin vaincue, respectively written in 1981 and 1985. According to French cult consultant Jean-Marie Abgrall, ECK doctrines "represent an amalgam (or a synthesis, according to its proponents) of various theories referring to human "energy" — mainly Chinese medicine and Vedic medicine. According to ECK, the human body has seven energy centers that vibrate on the same frequencies as certain colors or certain sounds."

On 22 February 1993, the French branch of the organization was dissolved by a court decision of the Tribunal de commerce of Paris and the founders split off. Véret founded the Nutrition énergétique des organes et des méridiens (NEOM), led the Ordre du temple de la Jérusalem céleste (OTJC).

The movement is currently active in France, Switzerland, Spain, Italy, Canada, the United States, Portugal, Australia... In France, the group seems to be in the decline.

== Reception ==
ECK was listed as a cult in the 1999 parliamentary report established by the Parliamentary Commission on Cults in France and also appeared in the 1997 Belgian parliamentary report. It was considered as dangerous because of its pseudo-medical speech which could be harmful to members' health, exaggerated requests for money, and indoctrination of the members who became dependent to the group. It was also criticized by anti-cult groups and former members.

In 2007, an academic thesis about the dangers of cults for health contained a large analysis of ECK beliefs and practices.

== Bibliography ==
- Nutripuncture: Stimulating the Energy Pathways of the Body Without Needles by Patrick Veret M.D. Cristina Cuomo Fabio Burigana, Antonio Dell'Aglio, Healing Arts Press;
- Vital impulses and human relations, applications of nutripuncture by Patrick Véret, Cristina Cuomo, Fabio Burigana;
