= Aix-en-Othe =

Part of Aix-Villemaur-Pâlis in Grand Est, France

- Part of Aix-Villemaur-Pâlis
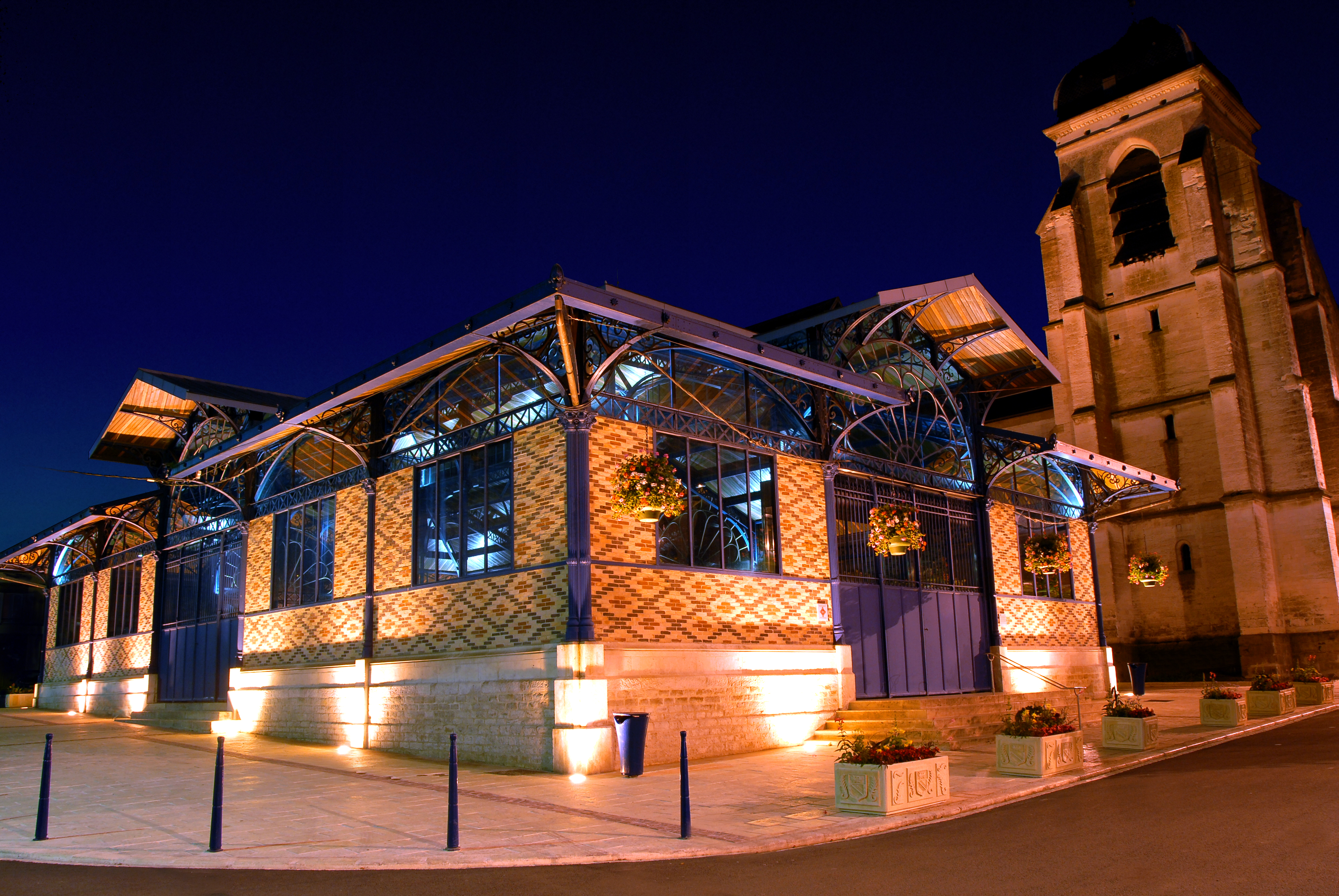
- The Victor Baltard style Hall (19th century)

- Coat of arms
- Location of Aix-en-Othe
- Location within France Location within Grand Est
- Coordinates: 48°13′27″N 3°44′07″E
- Country: France
- Region: Grand Est
- Department: Aube
- Arrondissement: Troyes
- Canton: Aix-Villemaur-Pâlis
- Commune: Aix-Villemaur-Pâlis
- Area^{1}: 34.76 km^{2} (13.42 sq mi)
- Elevation: 132 m (433 ft)
- Highest elevation: 246 m (807 ft)
- Lowest elevation: 124 m (407 ft)
- Population (2021): 2,266
  - Density: 65.19/km^{2} (168.8/sq mi)
- Time zone: UTC+01:00 (CET)
  - Summer (DST): UTC+02:00 (CEST)
- Postal code: 10160
- ^{1} French Land Register data, which excludes lakes, ponds, glaciers > 1 km^{2} (0.386 sq mi or 247 acres) and river estuaries.

Aix-en-Othe (French pronunciation: [ɛks ɑ̃.n‿ɔt], lit. 'Aix in Othe') is a former commune in the Aube department in the Champagne-Ardennes region of north-central France (now Grand Est region). On 1 January 2016, it was merged into the new commune Aix-Villemaur-Pâlis. It is the seat of Aix-Villemaur-Pâlis, and of the canton of Aix-Villemaur-Pâlis.

The commune has been awarded three flowers by the National Council of Towns and Villages in Bloom in the Competition of cities and villages in Bloom.

== Geography ==
Aix-en-Othe is located in the western part of the department of the Aube, 25 km west of Troyes 30 km and 40 km east of Sens. It is in the Nosle valley: the Nosle is a tributary of the Vanne river. The motorway E54/E511/A5 passes west to east about 2 km north of the commune. The road D374 comes south from the motorway to the town and passes through the commune to Villemoiron-en-Othe. Several other district roads pass through the commune: the D31 from the west and continuing to the north, the D77 and D139 from the south, the D194 from the south-east and the D121 from the east. The nearest railway station is outside the commune about 3 km north of the town near Villemaur-sur-Vanne accessible from the D374 road.

The Nosle stream flows through the commune from the south-east to the north-west and into the Vanne river. There are forests in the south and north of the commune which is mostly farmland. There are a number of hamlets in the commune. These are: La Vove, Le Jarc, Druisy, Pitoite, Les Cornees Alexandre, Les Cornees Lalliat, La Bouillant, Le Mineroy, and Les Chevreux in the southern corner.

=== Heraldry ===
| Arms of Aix-en-Othe | Blazon: Azure, with band of Argent between two cotices potent counter potent of Or, bordure barry wavy of 4 argent and azure, in chief Or charged with an eagle double-headed of sable. |

== Administration ==
List of Successive Mayors of Aix-en-Othe

| From | To | Name | Party |
|---|---|---|---|
| | 1857 | Fouet | |
| | 1887 | Michant | |
| 2001 | 2020 | Yves Fournier | PS |
| 2020 | 2026 | Gérard Trutat | |
| 2026 | Incumbent | Séverine Delsert-Broquet | |

=== Twinning ===
Aix-en-Othe has twinning associations with:

- Neresheim (Germany) since 1992.

== Population ==
The inhabitants of the commune are known as Aixois or Aixoises in French.

Historical population
| Year | Pop. | ±% p.a. |
|---|---|---|
| 2006 | 2,348 | — |
| 2011 | 2,450 | +0.85% |
| 2021 | 2,266 | −0.78% |
Source: INSEE

== Culture and heritage ==
=== Civil heritage ===
The commune has many buildings and structures that are registered as historical monuments:

- A House at CD 374 (19th century)
- The Henry-Courtois Hosiery Factory at 1 Rue Eugène Léger (20th century)
- The Gabut Hosiery Factory at 10 Rue du Maréchal Foch (19th century)
- The Martinet-Chevance Textile Factory at 40 Rue Saint-Avit (20th century)
- The Sinelle Hosiery Factory at 52 Rue Saint-Avit (19th century)
- The Grosley Hosiery Factory at 9bis Rue Saint-Avit (20th century)
- The Furgon Hosiery Factory at 9 Rue Schentzlé (20th century)
- The Quinquarlet-Avit Hosiery Factory at 18-24 Rue des Vannes (19th century)
- The Maurice Agofroy Hosiery Factory at 21 Rue des Vannes (20th century)
- The Quinquarlet Tanning Mill at 8 Rue du Moulin à Tan (19th century)
- The Covered Market (1889)
- The Town Hall contains a number of items that are registered as historical objects:
  - Christ on the Cross (16th century)
  - A Bas-relief: Christ (18th century)
  - 4 Paintings: Saint Peter, Saint Paul, Saint Nicolas, and Saint Augustin (17th century)
  - A Triptych: Annunciation, Adoration of the Magi, Repose of the Holy Family (16th century)
  - A Chalice with Paten: Scenes of the life of Christ (17th century)
  - A Reliquary Cross (14th century)
  - A Chalice (1865-1879)
  - The Furniture in the Town Hall

Other sites of interest

- A Baltard type Hall (19th century)
- The War Memorial. Inaugurated on 27 September 1902, it includes the names of the dead soldiers of France in 1870–1871, the two world wars, and the dead in North Africa and TOE. On the base of the monument is a hunter in the position of an alerted sentry.
- Smokestacks from the 19th century. There are two of them with a height of 30 to 40 metres. They are from the old Hosiery factories. They testify to the type of industrial activity in their time.

=== Religious heritage ===
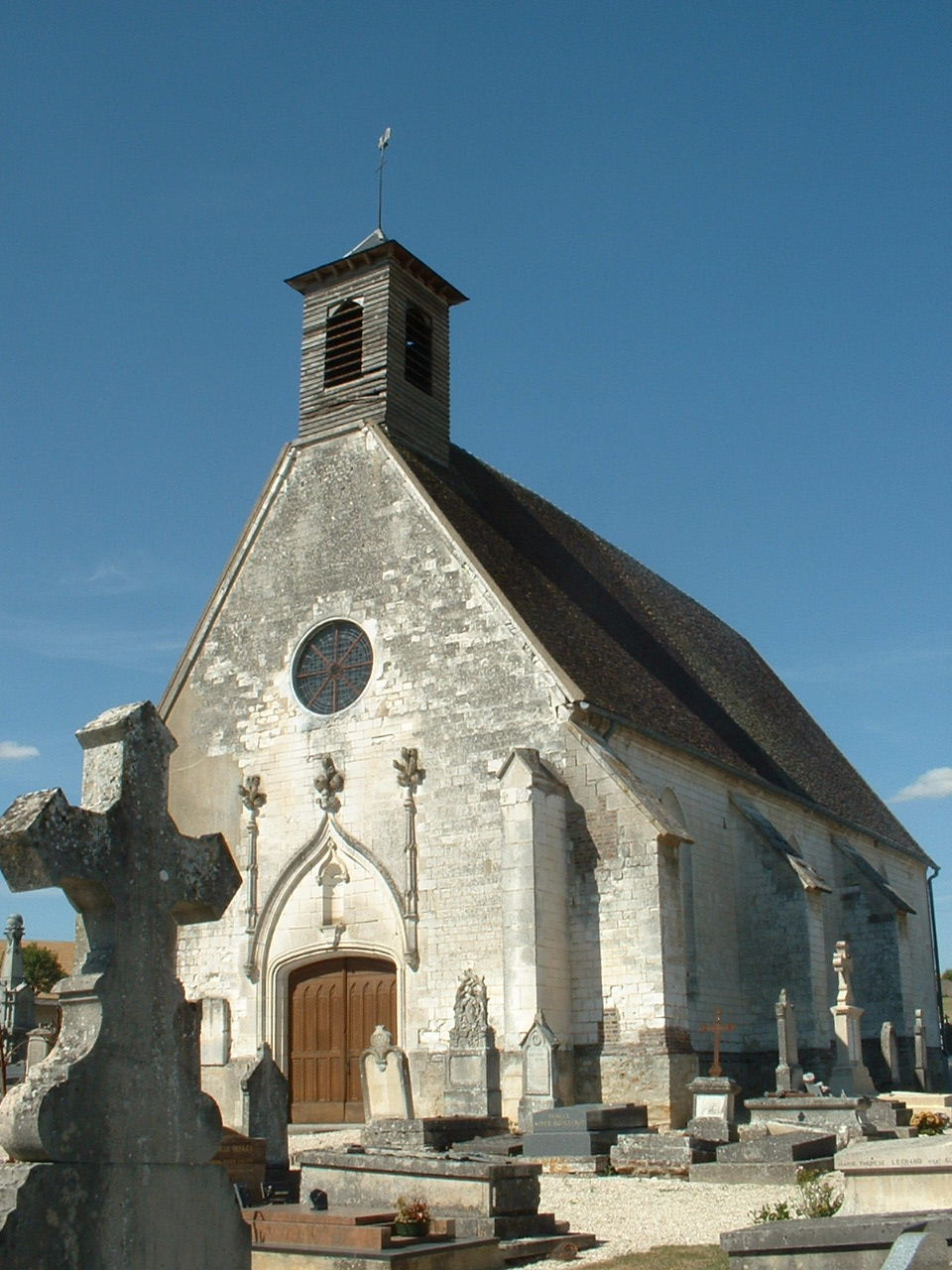
The Chapel of Saint-Avit

The commune has two religious buildings that are registered as historical monuments:

- The Chapel of Saint-Avit (15th century)
- The Church of the Nativity (16th century). The church contains a very large number of items that are registered as historical objects.

== Notable People linked to the commune ==
- Ernest Millot (1836-1891), explorer. In his expedition to the Red River (which flows through Hanoi) from 1872 to 1873 he sought a waterway to bring to Tonkin the immense wealth of Yunnan (South China). Ernest Millot was also mayor of the Shanghai French Concession
- Jacques Chéreau, sculptor, was born in Aix-en-Othe. He has exhibited in Napa (California) as well as Geneva, Brisbane, Miami, and San Francisco. His works are on permanent display in the Michelle Boullet Gallery in Paris, the Cafmeyer gallery in Knokke (Belgium), and recently at the Marie Ricco gallery in Calvi.
- Joachim du Bellay, in his "Ode to the Prince of Melphe" Antoine Caraccioli lauded Aiz, (that is to say Aix-en-Othe) as follows:

Go, see my sweet companion
The sweet pleasures of the Champaigne
Its fields, its waves and woods.
..........
Go and see this beautiful edifice
That nature and artifice
Have embellished with a hundred pleasures.
This is Aiz that beautiful abode
Only to be torn away in less than an hour
Our most ambitious desires.
There, a pleasant sorrow
The certainty fleeing across the plain
Where the hares follow us;
There saintly solitude
Far from trials and business affairs,
Happily we live.

== See also ==
- Communes of the Aube department

=== Bibliography ===
- Aix-en-Othe and the region, by E-L Collot, 1935. reprint of the original edition by Res Universis, Paris, 1993. (ISBN 978-2-7428-0236-4) (in French)
- Aix-en-Othe, memory of a commune of Aube, ARPA, 1988. (in French)
- Guide to the North of France, Frederic Zégierman, Paris, Arthème Fayard, 1999. (ISBN 978-2-213-59960-1) (in French)
- Our land of Othe, by Jeanne Martel and Jeannine Velut, Tourist Office of Othe country and the Vanne Valley, 2003. (ISBN 978-2-907894-32-6) (in French)
- Marguerite Beau: Essay on the religious architecture of the southern Champagne from Aube to Troyes (1991) (in French)
- Houses of yesterday in Othe country, by Jeanne Martel, ARPA, 2009 (ISBN 978-2-907894-49-4)
