= Jorge Ángel Livraga Rizzi =

Argentine writer and poet (1930–1991)

Jorge Angel Livraga Rizzi
- Born: September 3, 1930; Buenos Aires, Argentina
- Died: October 7, 1991; Madrid, Spain

Philosophical work
- Era: 20th-century philosophy
- Region: Western Philosophy
- School: Esotericism, Theosophy, Neoplatonism, Humanism

Jorge Ángel Livraga Rizzi (September 3, 1930 – October 7, 1991) was an Argentine poet, novelist, self-taught philosopher, essayist, educator and lecturer of Italian heritage best known for having founded and directed New Acropolis, an international philosophical educational and cultural organisation.

His works have been translated into several languages, titles in English include the novels The Alchemist and Ankor, the Last Prince of Atlantis, as well as The Spirits of Nature and Thebes, two studies on esotericism.

He was born in Buenos Aires, Argentina, and died in Madrid, Spain.

Livraga was convicted for illegal arm possession in 1988 by Madrid's Provincial Court.

== Biography ==
His mother, Victoria Rizzi, and his father, Ángel Livraga, an industrial engineer, were of Italian origin whose families had emigrated to Argentina in the late 19th century; (Livraga himself would later gain Italian citizenship). Livraga's father died when he was 15, and this led to a spiritual crisis, where, via his English teacher, he eventually came into contact with the Argentine Theosophical Society in the early fifties. He was a member of the Theosophical Society from 1950 to 1962.

At some point, he founded the magazine Estudios Teosóficos with Ada Albrecht, and founded New Acropolis, an association intended to promote Philosophy, along the lines of the classical Schools of Philosophy, such as Plato’s Academy. Livraga began to expand New Acropolis to other Latin American countries: Uruguay, Chile (in 1965), Perú, Brasil and Bolivia. Livraga's activities during this period consisted in writing the extensive course manuals.

He also had an interest in archeology, regularly organizing private expeditions and maintained a collection housed in a private museum, the Rodrigo Caro Museum. After his death, his natal home in Buenos Aires was converted into a museum in his name.

== Claims ==
His official New Acropolis biography claims that he was an academic member of the Esoteric group known as the International Philo-Byzantine Academy and University (IPHBAU) that according to the James Randi Foundation gives doctorates in Divinity, and the New Acropolis-related publishing house International Burckhardt Academy in Italy. It also claims that he was a knight of the fictional Real Orden de San Ildefonso y San Atilano, and a recipient of the silver cross from the Société Académique Arts Sciences Lettres (France), nevertheless apart from his New Acropolis biography no second hand source confirms such claims. His official biography use to list him as archeologist and doctor in philosophy from the inexistent Aztec Academy of Arts, but once such Academy was proven to be fictional the claim was retired.

His official biography often claims that he won the Argentine National Poetry Prize with his book Lotuses, however no source of such claim exists outside of New Acropolis and he's not listed as such in any source of the Argentinean government.

== Selected works (original Spanish editions) ==
- Ankor, El Discipulo - (A novel about spiritual initiation in Atlantis)- 1972 - Cunillera. Nuevas Ciencias.
- El Alqimista - (a historical novel) 1974 - ISBN 84-230-0041-9 - ISBN 978-84-230-0041-8 - Editorial Cunillera.
- Manual de primer curso: [ética, socio-política, filosofía de la historia]- Madrid : Nueva Acrópolis, D.L. 1978. ISBN 84-300-0173-5
- Moassy El Perro - (a novel about society)- 1980 - Nueva Acrópolis
- Cartas a Delia y Fernando - (philosophical work) Madrid : Nueva Acròpolis, 1981. ISBN 84-300-4075-7
- Pensamientos - (a collection of quotations)- 1982 -Nueva Acrópolis - ISBN 84-85982-02-9
- Ideario - vols. I, II & III - (A compilation of magazine articles)
- Los espíritus elementales de la naturaleza (The elemental spirits of nature, an esoteric study) - Madrid : Nueva Acrópolis, D.L. 1985. ISBN 84-85982-19-3
- Tebas - (Thebes, a study of Egypt) Valencia : Nueva Acrópolis, D.L. 1986. ISBN 84-85982-26-6
- Jorge Ángel Livraga. El teatro Mistérico en Grecia I. La Tragedia. (A study of ancient Greek theater) Ed. NA -1987 -Editorial Nueva Acrópolis - ISBN 84-85982-28-2
- Magia, Religion y Ciencia para el tercer Milenio I, II, III & IV- (a collection of lecture transcripts) 1995 - Nueva Acropolis, A.C.-ISBN 84-85982-61-4
