= Parliamentary Commission on Cults in France =

The French National Assembly, the lower house of the Parliament of France, set up a Parliamentary Commission on Cults in France (French: Commission parlementaire sur les sectes en France), also known as the Guyard Commission, on 11 July 1995 following the events involving the members of the Order of the Solar Temple in late 1994 and in 1995 in the Vercors, Switzerland and in Canada. Chaired by deputy Alain Gest, a member of the Union for French Democracy conservative party, the commission had to determine what should constitute a cult. It came to categorize various groups according to their supposed threat or innocuity (towards members of the groups themselves or towards society and the state). The Commission reported back in December 1995.

The Commission held various hearings with persons involved in new religious movement (NRM) activities or involved in anti-cult movements. Some organizations, including the Church of Scientology and the United States Department of State, criticized its categorization-methodology.

Subsequent French Parliamentary Commissions on cults reported in 1999 and in 2006.

== History ==
The first Parliamentary Commission on Cults in France was created in 1995, but the cults had long been watched by the Direction centrale des renseignements généraux. A report had already been done on this issue in 1983 by Alain Vivien, on a request by the prime minister.

The commission was established following a wave of mass suicides—and very likely murders—orchestrated by members of the "Order of the Solar Temple" in Canada, Switzerland, and France in 1994, as a 2023 bill reiterated. These events claimed a total of 53 lives, including 22 in France; they deeply affected public opinion.

The day after the publication of the report of the Commission, namely on 23 December 1995, the second mass murder of the Solar Temple happened, giving "much more media attention, given that it coincided with the tragedy of the Order of the Solar Temple that took place in the Vercors", although it did not mention the Ordre of the Solar Temple.

In 2008, a Union for a Popular Movement deputy, Jacques Myard, submitted a proposal for a parliamentary commission on cults, especially in medical and paramedical fields.

== Commission of 1995 ==
The Commission's report was unanimously adopted on 20 December 1995 by the 7 deputies who were present (out of 21; the other members had not received their notification because of a postal service strike). Jean-Pierre Brard, vice-chairman of the commission, considered that the propositions were "insufficient" and wanted to adopt a "special legislation" to effectively fight against dangerous cults. He said: "This vote is thus not representative of the whole commission. If I had been present, I would have abstained." The rules of the National Assembly say the report is still valid regardless of the number present.

=== Definition of "cult" ===
The report says: "Twenty hearings were conducted in these conditions, for a total of twenty-one hours. They have allowed the Commission to take note of information, experience and analysis of people having, for various reasons, a thorough knowledge of the cult phenomenon, whether administrators, doctors, lawyers, clergymen, representatives of organizations that assist victims of cults, and of course, former members of cults and leaders of cultic associations. The Commission has also requested assistance from various agencies in an attempt to refine the best knowledge of the scope of his study." The Minister of the Interior was the most important source of information.

Given the difficulty of defining the concept of cult, the Commission decided to resume the criteria followed by the Direction centrale des renseignements généraux, which it considers as "a body of evidence, each of which could lead to lengthy discussions."

- Threats to people:
  - mental destabilization;
  - exaggerated financial demands;
  - separation from one's home environment;
  - damage to physical integrity;
  - indoctrination of children;
- Threats to the community:
  - more or less anti-social speech;
  - public disorder;
  - importance of judicial involvements;
  - possible diversion of traditional economic circuits;
  - attempts to infiltration of public powers.

The Commission believes that it "was aware that neither the novelty nor the small number of followers, or even eccentricity could be retained as criteria" and explains: "The scope of its study has been voluntarily restricted to a certain number of associations gathering, usually around a spiritual leader, people sharing the same belief in a being or a number of transcendental ideas, situated or not at odds with "traditional" religions (Christian, Muslim, Hindu, Buddhist) which were excluded from this study, and on which have, at one time or another, been suspected of any activity contrary to public policy or individual freedoms."

Mindful not to give a result exactly impartial, the Commission nevertheless chose these criteria to conduct a partial analysis of reality, holding the common sense that the public ascribes to the notion of cult.

The published report of the Parliamentary Commission of 1995 (also known as the Rapport Gest-Guyard), appeared on 22 December 1995.

=== Response ===
One of the first criticism came from Bishop Jean Vernette, the national secretary of the French episcopate to the study of cults and new religious movements, which stressed that these criteria can be applied to almost all religions. Moreover, sociologists like Bruno Étienne emphasized that the mental manipulation should not be defined by the policemen of the Renseignements généraux (RG). The list of cults was based on the criteria defined by the RG, but without specifying which of their practices are specifically criticized.

In addition, the secrecy of the work led to questions about the presence or absence of certain organizations in the list. Étienne questioned on the presence of the CEDIPAC SA company, formerly known as European Grouping of Marketing Professionals (GEPM), while its activity is not in the religious field. The absence of Opus Dei or the Freemasons also raised questions.

In addition, Yves Bertrand, General Director of the Renseignements généraux from 1992 to 2003, spoke in 2007 about his collaborative work with the parliamentary reports on cults, and believed that Scientology and Jehovah's Witnesses do not deserve to be diabolized and "to put on the same level some companies of thought and genuine cultic movements that alienate the freedom of their members, the result is the opposite of the desired goals".

==== Controversies on the file's content ====
Some movements have sought access to documents that led to their classification onto the list of cults by the parliamentary commission. The government refused, invoking the risk to public safety and security of the State in case of disclosure of information from Renseignements généraux.

Several movements engaged in legal proceedings that lasted several years before they can access these secret documents. Jehovah's Witnesses finally succeeded in 2006, after the request was filed to the Council of State. The first judgments on this issue were given in 2005 by the Administrative Court of Appeal of Paris after examining the documents to assess the merits of the refusal of the Ministry of Interior, who mentioned the risk to public safety. On 3 July 2006, the Council of State rejected the appeal of the Minister of Interior and confirmed the same day the annulment of the decision of the Minister of Interior who refused to provide to the Christian Federation of Jehovah's Witnesses the documents made by the Renseignements généraux for the second report. On 18 December 2006, at a press conference in Paris, Jehovah's Witnesses released the files prepared by the Renseignements généraux for the commission on cults in 1995. According to Le Monde, this work, "which was released after eight years of proceedings, only includes a form of presentation and a list their places of worship."

The Church of Scientology obtained access to documents of the Renseignements généraux, and its spokesman said: "There was nothing in the files."

The Universal Church of the Kingdom of God also obtained the right of access to the file made by the Renseignements généraux which justified its classification as cults in the parliamentary report. In a decision of 1 December 2005 validated by the Council of State, the Administrative Court of Appeal in Paris overturned the refusal of the Minister of Interior to grant the request of the association and ordered the files release.

==== Lack of opposing debate ====
The parliamentary report was strongly criticized by U.S. officials. In 1999, a report on religious freedom around the world conducted by the State Department accused it of not having heard from the groups accused and the lack of opposing debate.

==== Raffarin's circulaire, 2005 ====
On 27 May 2005 (just before he left office), the then Prime Minister of France, Jean-Pierre Raffarin, issued a circulaire which stressed that the government must exercise vigilance in taking account of the evolution of the cult-phenomenon, which, he wrote, made the list of movements attached to the Parliamentary Report of 1995 less and less pertinent, based on the observation that small groups form in a scattered, more mobile and less-easily identifiable manner, making use in particular of the possibilities of spreading offered by the Internet.

The Prime Minister asked his civil servants to update a number of instructions issued previously, to apply criteria set in consultation with the Interministerial Commission for Monitoring and Combating Cultic Deviances (MIVILUDES), and to avoid falling back on lists of groups for the identification of cultic deviances.

== Commission of 1999 ==
=== Content ===
A further French parliamentary commission reported in 1999 on cults in connection with money and the economy. Several groups previously omitted in the 1995 report were added (Ancient Mystical Order Rosae Crucis, Anthroposophy, At the Heart of the Communication, Prima Verba, Energo-Chromo-Kinese). The report said that the Jehovah's Witnesses and the Church of Scientology were the richest "cults", whose annual budget reached respectively FF200,000,000 and FF60,000,000 (€30,500,000 and €9,147,000 respectively). Sōka Gakkai, Ancient Mystical Order Rosae Crucis, Sukyo Mahikari, New Apostolic Church, Unification Church, Dianova, Association of the Triumphant Vajra (Mandarom) and Anthroposophy had an annual income between FF20,000,000 and FF50,000,000 (approximately between €3,000,000 and €7,600,000).

=== Controversy about Anthroposophy ===
The publication of this report provoked strong reactions; however, the Union des associations médicales anthroposophiques de France, the Société financière de la NEF and the Fédération des Écoles Steiner, owned by Anthroposophy, attempted legal action. After presenting the report on France 2, a complaint for defamation was filed against the president of the parliamentary commission Jacques Guyard. The Tribunal de grande instance de Paris said that Guyard was "unable to justify of a serious investigation" to support his allegations, that he "repeatedly referred to "secret" nature of the work of the commission", and that "the contradictory nature of the investigation conducted just consisted of sending a questionnaire to sixty movements considered as cultic". In addition, "the judges felt that the injury of plaintiffs was important (…) since the defamatory statements were made by a deputy president of the commission, whose authority and competence could not have been doubted by the public". In September 2001, the Cour d'Appel de Paris maintained this conclusion but Guyard obtained his discharge on the ground of good faith.

== Third-party comments, 2000 ==
The 2000 annual report of the United States Commission on International Religious Freedom, released by the Bureau of Democracy, Human Rights, and Labor of the U.S. Department of State, stated:

The ensuing publicity [by the release of a parliamentary report against "sectes" contributed to an atmosphere of intolerance and bias against minority religions. Some religious groups reported that their members suffered increased intolerance after having been identified on the list.

== Third-party comments, 2004 ==
In its 2004 annual report, the United States Commission on International Religious Freedom stated:

[...] official government initiatives and activities that targets "sects" or "cults" have fueled an atmosphere of intolerance toward members of minority religions in France. [...] These initiatives [the publication of reports characterizing specific groups as dangerous and the creating of agencies to monitor and fight these groups] are particularly troubling because they are serving as models for countries in Eastern Europe where the rule of law and other human rights are much weaker than in France.

The 2004 report concluded with an assessment that the restructuring of the main French agency concerned with this issue (referring to the new MIVILUDES replacing its predecessor, the Mission Interministérielle pour la Lutte contre les Sectes [Interministerial Commission to Combat the Cults] (MILS), had reportedly improved religious freedoms in France.

== Commission of 2006 ==
In a press-release dated 28 June 2006, several deputies from the Socialist Party, from the UDF, and others, stated that "certain people had believed that they could celebrate a so-called turning-point in the French policy of defending individual and collective liberties against the dangerous conduct of cults and a renewed questioning of the parliamentary reports of 1995 and 1999, as a result of the appearance of the Prime Minister's circulaire. The spokespersons said that the issue addressed by the Prime Minister related to the data collected in 1995 and 1999 becoming stale. They added that setting up a new Commission of Enquiry would permit a "coming to grips with a new state-of-play in the cultic movement".

On 28 June 2006, in response to a unanimous resolution of the Law Commission (commission des lois), the French National Assembly unanimously passed a resolution to set up a Parliamentary Commission of Enquiry into the influence of cultic movements and the consequences of their practices on the physical and mental health of minors. The 30 members of the Commission included Georges Fenech (President), Philippe Vuilque (rapporteur), Martine David and Alain Gest (Vice-Presidents) and Jean-Pierre Brard and Rudy Salles (Secretaries).

The Commission presented its report to the Assembly on 19 December 2006. The report contained 50 recommendations which aimed to protect endangered children. George Fenech accused public officials (and especially the bureau des cultes of the Ministry of the Interior), of "negligence, even complaisance". He expressed his astonishment at the lack of a good definition of the profession of psychotherapeutics, which he described as a "mine for cults" where gurus flourish.

== See also ==
- Governmental lists of cults and sects
- Status of religious freedom in France
- About–Picard law – French anti-cult law
