= New Acropolis =

Non-profit organization

International Organization New Acropolis
- Founded: July 15, 1957
- Founder: Jorge Ángel Livraga Rizzi
- Type: Non-governmental organization
- Purpose: Philosophy, esotericism, philanthropy
- Location: Brussels, Belgium
- Origins: Argentina
- Region served: Worldwide
- Method: Culture, volunteerism
- Key people: Delia Steinberg Guzmán, honorary president. Carlos Adelantado Puchal, president.
- Website: www.acropolis.org

New Acropolis (NA; Spanish: Organización Internacional Nueva Acrópolis, OINA; French: Organisation Internationale Nouvelle Acropole, association internationale sans but lucratif) is a non-profit organisation originally founded in 1957 by Jorge Ángel Livraga Rizzi in Argentina. It is positioning itself as a school of philosophy that promotes culture and practises volunteering, and is present in approximately 500 branches in over 50 countries." As of 2026, its president is Carlos Adelantado Puchal.

New Acropolis has been described by scholars as having pro-fascist sympathies or as incorporating fascist ideologies. It has been criticized by newspapers, and politicians.

In 1995, it was classified as a cult by a French parliamentary report.

== Aims ==
New Acropolis describes its founding principles as follows:

1. To promote an ideal of universal fraternity, based on respect for human dignity, beyond racial, sexual, cultural, religious, social and other differences.

2. To encourage the love of wisdom through the comparative study of philosophies, religions, sciences, and arts, to promote the knowledge of the human being, the laws of Nature, and the Universe.

3. To develop the best of the human potential, by promoting the realization of the human being as an individual and his or her integration as an active and conscious part of society and nature, to improve the world.

According to the organization's 2018 assembly resolution, New Acropolis has "three lines of action": philosophy, culture and volunteering.

== Teachings ==
The organization describes itself as a school of philosophy, which it defines as "a way of life [and] as a means of access to spiritual knowledge and collective and individual realization." According to the organization's webpage, its official introduction program includes the philosophies of Buddhism, Tibet, China, Greece, and Rome among others. The school also offers advanced studies in courses such as psychology, history of philosophy, and symbology. An article published by the organization in The Parliamentary Review describes NA as an educational charity promoting the renewal of philosophy in the "classical tradition".

Scholar of Western esotericism Antoine Faivre asserts that Jorge A. Livraga Rizzi wanted to create an "eclectic and rational approach" to Eastern and Western thought. In addition to the study of ancient sources, New Acropolis also tries to promote modern authors such as CG Jung, Mircea Eliade, Joseph Campbell, Gilbert Durand, Henry Corbin, Paul Ricœur, Dane Rudhyar, Jean Chevalier, Jacob Boehme, Helena Petrovna Blavatsky, and Edgar Morin. Some ancient authors it promotes in its literature are Pythagoras and Plato; it draws on Livraga's understanding of neoplatonism, Alexandrine hermeticism, renaissance philosophy, eastern philosophy (Hinduism and Tibetan Buddhism) as well.

French writer Jean-Pierre Bayard describes New Acropolis as a school of philosophy focused on esotericism and symbolism. It is described by Clifton L. Holland as "a post-theosophical movement that combines elements from many sources: Theosophy, Esoteric thought, alchemy, astrology, and Eastern and Greek philosophy".

According to Peter B. Clarke, NA teaches a certain esoteric apocalypticism regarding the imminent Age of Aquarius which according to the group "will give rise to great pain and suffering at the outset". It has also been described as an spiritist group.

== Activities ==
The organization reported in 2010 having around 10,000 members around the world in more than forty countries. According to the organization, the governing board of the association is composed of a representative of each of its member associations and it functions through a decentralized financial system.

The organization's music competitions attract many participants, such as one in Peru which in 2018 attracted more than 6,000. The organization's 2018 commemoration of the 150th birth anniversary of Mahatma Gandhi, which took place in Mumbai, India, was endorsed by right-wing Indian Prime minister Narendra Modi, the Dalai Lama, and Devendra Fadnavis.

New Acropolis has been promoting World Philosophy Day seminars around the world; some of its branches were supported in this effort by UNESCO.

In 2020, the Peruvian branch of the organization was awarded the Congressional Diploma of Honor by congresswoman Maria Teresa Cabrera, for its educational work promoting culture, philosophy and volunteering.

== Organization and structure ==
According to 1976's Manual del Dirigente (Leader's Handbook) the organization's structure is pyramidal and hierarchical. The highest level is the World Command, an office that once belonged to Livraga. Under the World Command is the Guardian of Seals, followed by the Continental Commands, the Central Commands, the National or Federal Councilors, the Unified Zone Commands, and Branch Chiefs in descending order.

The handbook itself expresses in its page 3 that its contents should be kept secret not only from the public but from every non-directive members of the organization. It also establishes that it is valid for the leaders to hide their Acropolitan ideas, beliefs, and concepts when speaking in public or adapt them to the listener's wishes, and that most of the symbols, salutes, and customs of the organization should be kept secret as other political movements have used them in the past staining its image in the public eye.

The Reglamento para miembros (Members’ bylaws) of the organization establishes a series of norms for the participants including the obligation of at least 12 hours per month of voluntary work (although this can be increased if the person is sanctioned or if they can't afford the monthly payments), the prohibition of any kind of critique to the leaders and fellow members "to the former in any sense, to the later in their personal affairs", the requirement of the students to stand up anytime the teacher enters the room, the mandatory use of tie and jacket for men and skirts for women in all official events, and to refrain from any kind of so-called "immorality", among others.

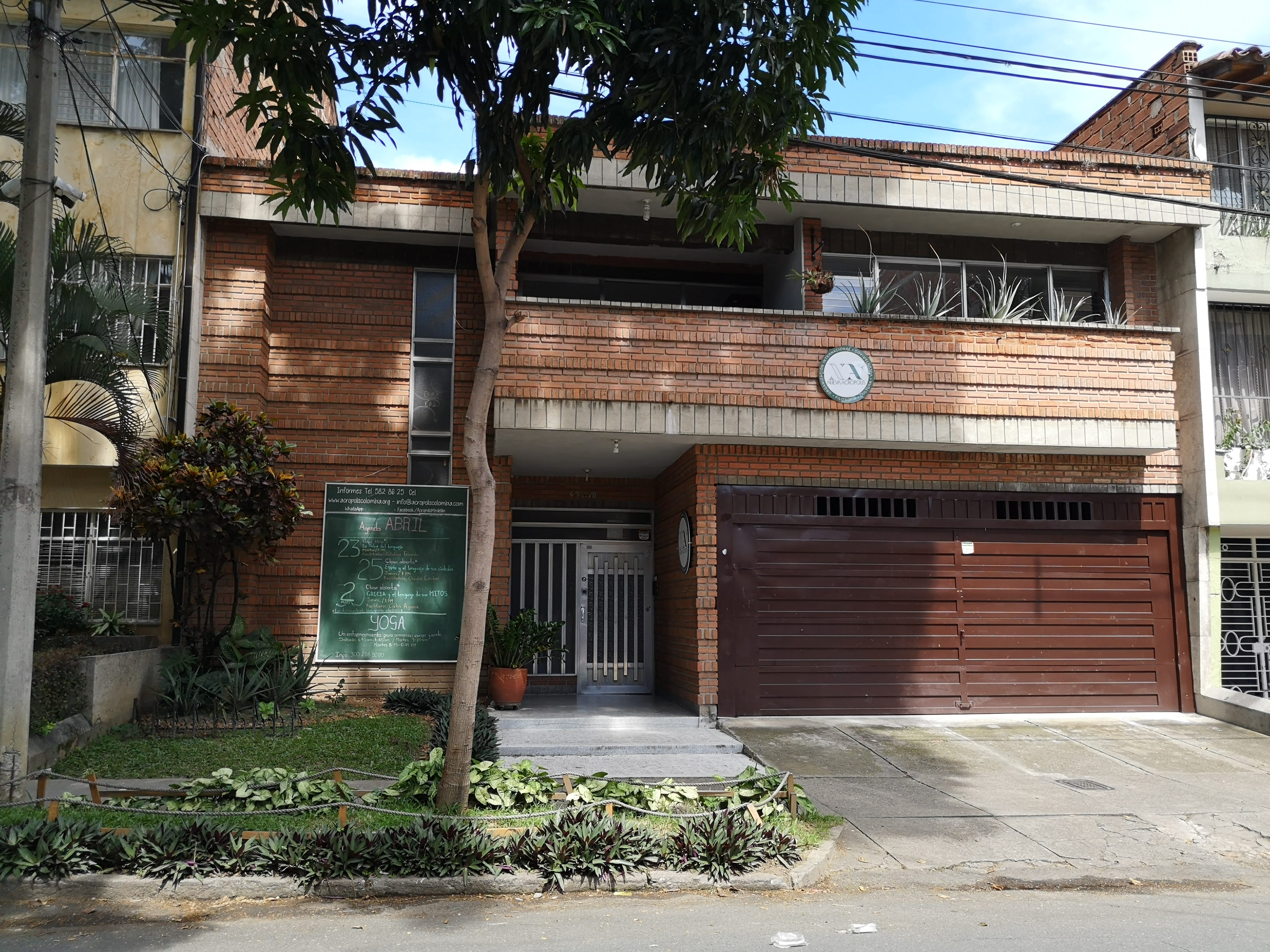
New Acropolis in Medellín, Colombia.

== Political ideology ==
New Acropolis officially condemns Nazism, racism, and political extremism, but the organization has been accused of supporting neo-fascism and neo-Nazism. Professor Nicholas Goodrick-Clarke stated in 2003 that "the structure, organization, and symbolism of the Nouvelle Acropole [New Acropolis] is clearly indebted to fascist models." According to Jean-Marie Abgrall, "New Acropolis has borrowed elitist and Aryanist symbols and ideas."

As stated in 2010 by Religions of the World: A Comprehensive Encyclopedia of Beliefs and Practices : "The alleged use of paramilitary language, symbols, and forms of organization, along with more recent charges of brainwashing, have led to many criticisms of the New Acropolis in Europe, especially in France, since the mid-1970s.”

== Cult status ==
The French Commission on Cults (1995) as well as a Belgian parliamentary commission have, as of 1997, registered it as a cult in their respective countries in an annexed blacklist to their report, along with 171 other associations. On May 27, 2005, the public cult blacklists were abandoned by the French government. However, Serge Blisko, director of the French Interministerial Mission for Monitoring and Combatting Cultic Deviances (MIVILUDES) said to Vice magazine in 2014 that "the French government still considers New Acropolis a cult and it remains under surveillance".

== See also ==
- Cult
- Governmental lists of cults and sects
- List of new religious movements
- New religious movement

== Bibliography ==
- Gallego, Fernando (2003). "Asociación Cultural Nueva Acrópolis". In Forni, Floreal H.; Cárdenas, Luis A.; Mallimaci, Fortunato (eds.). Guía de la diversidad religiosa de Buenos Aires (in Spanish). Buenos Aires: Editorial Biblos. pp. 402–404. ISBN 978-9507863899.
- Holland, Clifton L. (2010). "New Acropolis Cultural Association". In Melton, J. Gordon; Baumann, Martin (eds.). Religions of the World: A Comprehensive Encyclopedia of Beliefs and Practices (2nd ed.). ABC-CLIO. pp. 2066–2067. ISBN 978-1598842036.
