= Cultural Office of Cluny =

- Classification: Roman Catholic
- Region: France
- Founder: Olivier Fenoy
- Origin: 1963; France and other countries
- Official website: www.officeculturelcluny.org/

The Cultural Office of Cluny, often named OCC (renamed Cultural Office of Cluny – National Federation of Total Animation [OCC – FNAG] in 1978) is a Catholic-related association registered as a voluntary association, created in France by Olivier Fenoy in 1963. It is a group of cultural animation composed of a theater company whose activities include art, cultural travels, and photography among other things. Although primarily located in France, the OCC has several centers in Québec and Chile. The group was widely referred to as a cult in the media, particularly after the publication of the first parliamentary report in which it was mentioned.

== History and organization ==
Strongly influenced by a text of Pius XII sent to artists in 1952 and Marthe Robin, Olivier Fenoy created and developed the OCC alongside Grégoire Molle. The name comes from a café in the Quartier Latin, "Le Petit Cluny", where the founders organized their first meetings and therefore has no connection with the Abbey of Cluny. In 1973, "the community of Cluny" or "missionaries of hope" was created by hundreds of people who wanted to permanently live this lifestyle. The first artistic creation of the group was "Un Caprice" by Alfred de Musset. Students centers were quickly created. The OCC has acutellement about ten centers throughout France (Palis, Entrevaux, Château de Machy, Center Le Brûlaire, etc...). It publishes a quarterly magazine named Le Courrier: Nouvelles de Cluny.

In 1972, the Secretary of State for Youth and Sports granted to the OCC a provisional approval as an organization of popular education. This approval was withdrawn in 1982, then reinstated by the State Council in 1990.

== Reception ==
The OCC was listed as a cult in the 1995 and 1999 parliamentary reports and considered as a "pseudo-Catholic" and a "medium-sized cult" in terms of wealth (its annual budget reached between 5 and 20 million francs at the time). The commission accused the OCC of trying to infiltrate the world of childhood through a formula of courses and seminars in the field of leisure, but also academic support and cultural development. Anti-cult association ADFI criticized the OCC for its methods of seduction, its particular lifestyle (reduced sleep, long prayers, inability to be alone, etc.), possible families breakdowns, its hierarchical structure, psychological pressures, and despoilment. Former members claimed to have been "seduced by promises of social advancement" in the group and then were "totally ruined after their stay at the centers in Claux and Le Machy". The OCC rules were described as "binding and totalitarian".

For their part, Bishop of Troyes Gérard Daucourt, as well as Bishops Montagrin, Pontier, and Jean Vernette, criticized the cult classification of the OCC and wrote a protest letter to Philippe Séguin, arguing that this caused some harm to the OCC as well as to the Catholic Church. For André-Hubert Mesnard, the classification made by the Parliamentary Commission was not democratic because the list could not be changed after its publication and thus the groups incriminated, including the OCC, could not defend themselves against criticisms. CESNUR stated that the group was "nearly bankrupted due to the refusal of public theatres to air its shows" after its cult designation.

== Judicial cases ==
The OCC launched numerous lawsuits or have been sued in many cases throughout its history. The first ones were in 1980: the OCC was sued on material issues in Digne and Aix-en-Provence. On these occasions, Fenoy's brother, former followers, parents' members, and a priest from Lyon provided negative testimonies about the association.

On 4 June 1998, the court of Angers, then on 4 November 1999, the Court of Appeal of Angers dismissed an OCC lawsuit which said that its leaders were lay monks and therefore not under the social security regulations, and tried to challenge the tax recovery imposed by URSSAF.

The General Councils of several French départements, including Rhône and Aube, and the Grenoble city hall gave important subsidies, which raised much criticism.
