= Ada Albrecht =

Argentine author

- 1973
- Education: Poet, writer, teacher and composer.
- Writing career
- Language: Spanish
- Website: www.hastinapura.org.ar

Ada Albrecht was an argentinian esoteric leader, creator of the controversial Hastinapura Foundation.

== Life ==
Ada Albrecht (February 26, 1932 - Mahasamadhi in May 20, 2025), was born in Corrientes, Argentina. She moved to Buenos Aires in her youth, where she continued her studies, graduating as a Professor of Philosophy and Educational Sciences. She maried Jorge Ángel Livraga Rizzi, theosophic thinker and founder of the New Acropolis organization.

Between 1972 and 1973, she made an extended study trip to India, where she learned the philosophy of Advaita Vedanta. In 1977, she made a second trip, during which she completed her studies in Vedanta.

Ada Albrecht's guru was the monk Yogeshwarananda, who was a disciple of the monk Vishudananda, who was, in turn, a disciple of the monk Krishnananda. All of them belonged to the Advaita Vedanta school of philosophy.

Furthermore, during her stay in India, she studied in depth the grammar and writing of Sanskrit.

Ada Albrecht en el sagrado río Ganges en 1973

In 1981, she founded the Hastinapura Foundation from a split within New Acropolis.

She wrote about 40 books on topics such as spirituality, pedagogy, and universal mysticism, including stories and books for children. She has also translated a large number of Hindu philosophy texts into Spanish, mainly about Advaita Vedanta.

Several countries and media outlets have leveled criticisms against her organization, for instance emotional entrapment or doctrinal authority.

In 2010, an article published in argentinian newspaper Tribuna de Periodistas directly accuses Hastinapura of having caused the breakups of many families.

== Literary works ==
- Adiós a mi Rayi, Buenos Aires, Editorial Hastinapura, 2004, ISBN 950-9102-87-3
- Bhagavad Gîtâ con notas pedagógicas, Buenos Aires, Editorial Hastinapura, 2008, ISBN 978-987-1327-19-5
- Bhakti Sûtras de Nârada con notas pedagógicas, Buenos Aires, Editorial Hastinapura, 2007, ISBN 978-987-1327-11-9
- Cuentos Egipcios, Buenos Aires, Editorial Hastinapura, 2007, ISBN 978-987-1327-09-6
- Cuentos para el Alma, Buenos Aires, Editorial Hastinapura, 2010, ISBN 978-950-9102-76-7
- El Evangelio del Maestro, Buenos Aires, Editorial Hastinapura, 2015, ISBN 978-987-1327-95-9
- El País del Más Acá, Buenos Aires, Editorial Hastinapura, 2016, ISBN 978-987-4038-02-9
- El Secreto de la Felicidad: El Amor a Dios, Buenos Aires, Editorial Hastinapura, 2014, ISBN 978-987-1327-77-5
- Enseñanzas de Meister Eckhart, Buenos Aires, Editorial Hastinapura, 2014, ISBN 978-987-1327-81-2
- Filosofía Final: Introducción a la Vedânta Advaita, Buenos Aires, Editorial Hastinapura, 2014, ISBN 978-987-1327-74-4
- Gîtâ Sara: La Esencia del Bhagavad Gîtâ, Buenos Aires, Editorial Hastinapura, 2015, ISBN 978-987-1327-92-8
- Guía breve para la meditación, Buenos Aires, Editorial Hastinapura, 2015, ISBN 978-987-1327-93-5
- Guía práctica para la meditación, Buenos Aires, Editorial Hastinapura, 2012, ISBN 978-987-1327-50-8

== Translations ==
- Autoconocimiento, Buenos Aires, Editorial Hastinapura, 2014, ISBN 978-987-1327-79-9
- Bhakti Sûtras de Nârada, Buenos Aires, Editorial Hastinapura, 2011, ISBN 978-987-1327-45-4
- Brihadâranyaka Upanishad, Buenos Aires, Editorial Hastinapura, 2018, ISBN 978-987-4038-22-7
- Chândogya Upanishad, Buenos Aires, Editorial Hastinapura, 2008, ISBN 978-987-1327-18-8
- Comentarios al Bhagavad Gîtâ (Vinoba), Buenos Aires, Editorial Hastinapura, 2011, ISBN 950-9102-81-4
- Isa, Katha, Kena, Mundaka y Prashna Upanishads, Buenos Aires, Editorial Hastinapura, 2011, ISBN 978-987-1327-47-8
- Mandukya Upanishad (Swami Sarvananda), Buenos Aires, Editorial Hastinapura, 2011, ISBN 950-9102-84-9
- Mandukya Upanishad (Swami Nikhilananda), Buenos Aires, Editorial Hastinapura, 2016, ISBN 978-987-4038-05-0
- Sanatsujâtîya, Buenos Aires, Editorial Hastinapura, 2015, ISBN 978-987-1327-99-7
- Svetâsvatara, Taittiriya y Aitareya Upanishads, Buenos Aires, Editorial Hastinapura, 2015, ISBN 978-987-1327-85-0
- Srimad Bhagavatam, Buenos Aires, Editorial Hastinapura, 2016, ISBN 978-987-4038-00-5
- El Camino del Amor (Subhash Anand), Buenos Aires, Editorial Hastinapura, 2024, ISBN 978-987-4038-72-2
- La Sabiduría del Mândûkya Upanishad (Swami Sarvananda), Buenos Aires, Editorial Hastinapura, 2023, ISBN 978-987-4038-62-3
- Tres Upanishads para meditación (Swami Sivananda), Buenos Aires, Editorial Hastinapura, 2023, ISBN 978-987-4038-59-3
