= Aix-Villemaur-Pâlis =

Commune in Grand Est, France

Aix-Villemaur-Palis
- Commune
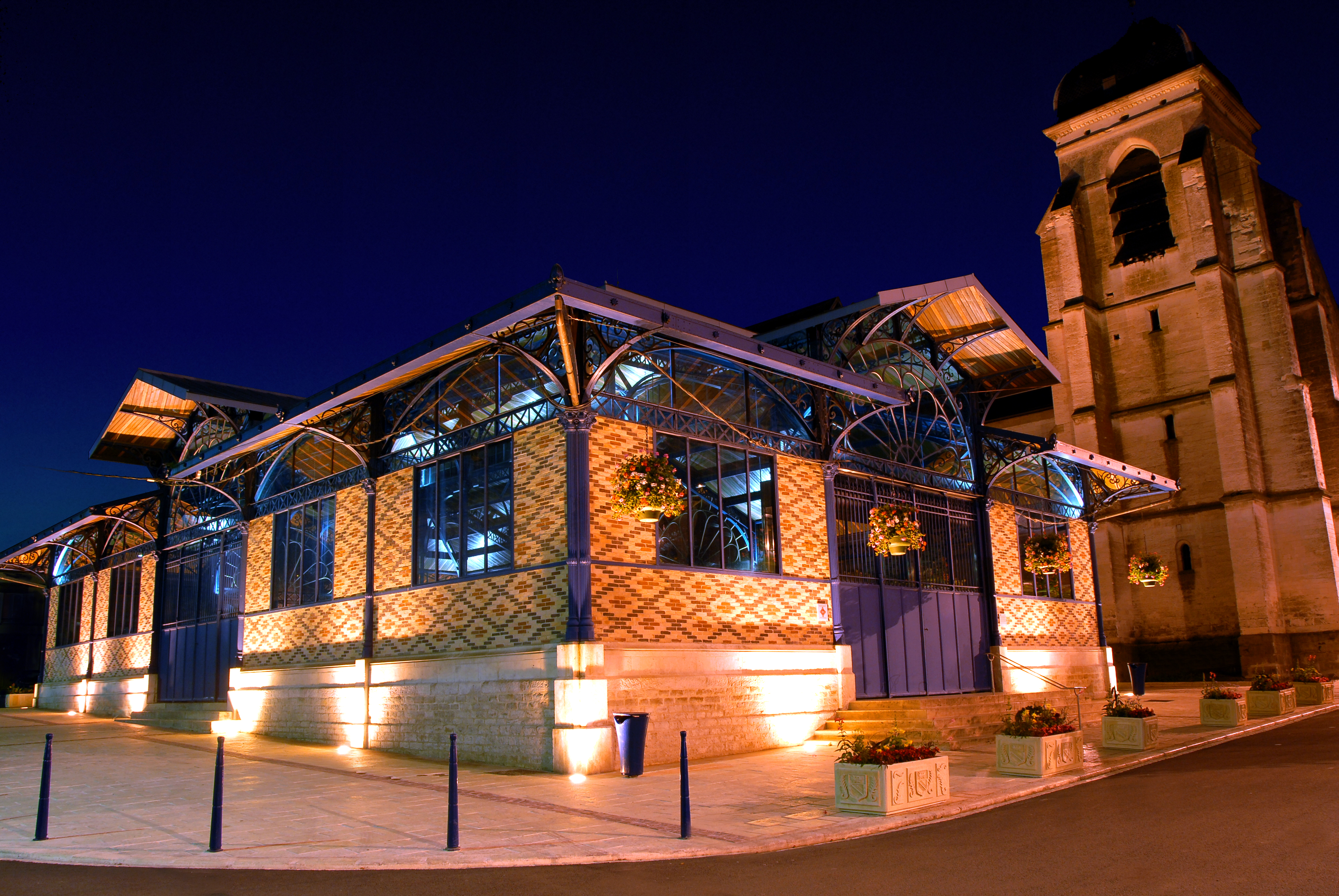
- The covered market in Aix-en-Othe
- Location of Aix-Villemaur-Palis
- Location within France Location within Grand Est
- Coordinates: 48°13′23″N 3°43′55″E
- Country: France
- Region: Grand Est
- Department: Aube
- Arrondissement: Troyes
- Canton: Aix-Villemaur-Pâlis
- Intercommunality: Pays d'Othe

Government
  - Mayor (2024–2026): Séverine Delsert-Broquet
- Area^{1}: 75.30 km^{2} (29.07 sq mi)
- Population (2023): 3,236
  - Density: 42.97/km^{2} (111.3/sq mi)
- Time zone: UTC+01:00 (CET)
  - Summer (DST): UTC+02:00 (CEST)
- INSEE/Postal code: 10003 /10160
- ^{1} French Land Register data, which excludes lakes, ponds, glaciers > 1 km^{2} (0.386 sq mi or 247 acres) and river estuaries.

Aix-Villemaur-Palis (French pronunciation: [ɛks vilmɔʁ palis]) is a commune in the Aube department of northeastern France. The municipality was established on 1 January 2016 and consists of the former communes of Aix-en-Othe, Villemaur-sur-Vanne and Pâlis.

== Administration ==
List of mayors

From	To	Name	Party	Position
2014 (2016)	2020	Yves Fournier		
2020	2026	Gérard Trutat		

== Population ==
Historical population
Year	Pop.	±% p.a.
1968	3,202	—
1975	3,303	+0.44%
1982	3,244	−0.26%
1990	3,127	−0.46%
1999	3,110	−0.06%
2007	3,468	+1.37%
2012	3,593	+0.71%
2017	3,554	−0.22%
2023	3,236	−1.55%
Source: INSEE

== See also ==
- Communes of the Aube department
