= Le Groupement =

Defunct cycling team

Team information
- UCI code: GRO
- Registered: France
- Founded: 1995
- Disbanded: 1995
- Discipline: Road
- Bicycles: Bianchi

Key personnel
- General manager: Guy Mollet
- Team manager: Patrick Valcke

Team name history
- 1995: Le Groupement

Le Groupement was a French cycling team that existed from the beginning of the 1995 season until a week before the start of that year's Tour de France in June 1995. Financial difficulties and allegations of a pyramid scheme against its main sponsor led to its folding. The team was spearheaded by then reigning road race World Champion Luc Leblanc.

== History ==
=== Founding of the team ===
The set up of the team in July 1994 was done through a holding company called Sport Competition, for the sponsor, Le Groupement Européen des Professionnels du Marketing. Le Groupement was a door-to-door sales organisation, operating exclusively in France. The initial budget was 30 million francs, or $6 million. Their star signing was Luc Leblanc, who had finished fourth at the 1994 Tour de France and won the 1994 UCI Road World Championship Road Race just days after he signed the contract. Other notable riders included former Tour de France mountain classification winner Robert Millar (now known as Philippa York), Ronan Pensec and the sprinter Jean-Paul van Poppel. The team held its first meeting in early December 1994 in Florida and a second from 21 December in Lille.

==== Graeme Obree ====
Graeme Obree, holder of the hour record when the team was set up, was recruited into the team by Millar in what would have been his first road cycling engagement. Obree missed the first meeting in Florida, held shortly after the death of his brother, then went on vacation to the USA. He misunderstood the team's directions on where to travel for the second team meeting and flew to Paris instead of Lille. Picked up by Millar, he arrived late and both riders were sent to sleep without food as punishment. When Obree failed to attend the New Year's training camp in the Alps, he was fired on 1 January 1995, just hours into the official beginning of his contract. Team management gave "unprofessional conduct" as the reason for his dismissal. In a 2012 interview with the newspaper The Scotsman, Obree alleged that the reason for his firing was his unwillingness to use performance enhancing drugs. According to Obree, the team asked him to set aside £2,000 of his salary for a "medical back-up programme" for purposes of doping.

=== Performances ===
The team initially targeted the Ardennes classic races, such as La Flèche Wallonne and Liège–Bastogne–Liège with Leblanc, but he fell ill and without him, the team did not perform well. The lack of performance led the team to turn down its invitation to the 1995 Giro d'Italia. Robert Millar took victory at the British National Road Race Championships in June 1995, but this turned out to be the last race for the team, which folded two days later. Over the short course of its existence, the team won eight races, including three victories for German sprinter Marcel Wüst.

=== Issues for sponsoring company and folding ===
From the very beginning, the team hit financial difficulties. The main reason for this was negative publicity directed at their sponsor, Le Groupement. The company's business relied mainly on 50,000 individual independent salespeople, selling goods directly to their friends and family. This business model, based on "motivational sessions and individual investment in the company's retail goods" was deemed by many to constitute a pyramid scheme. Rumours also arose that the company was a smokescreen organisation for "an American sect". The team's manager, Patrick Valcke, later stated: "One day it emerged that the boss of the team had been part of some Evangelist movement in the USA. [...] In the US they were used to these kinds of religious [movements] but it was really foreign to the public in France. It became an obsession for the media for weeks on end." Due to the negative news coverage, sales for Le Groupement fell by 35 per cent during the first two months of 1995. The accusations and financial woes had led to a threat by Le Groupement to end sponsorship as early as March, but the team continued for the time being. In late June, negotiations were started to merge the squad with Aki–Gipiemme, but Jean-Marie Leblanc, director of the Tour de France announced that a merged team would not be granted access to the race. The sponsor demanded from the team management to have the riders race the 1995 Tour de France without guaranteering payment. Valcke refused and informed the riders less than a week before the start of the Tour that the team had ceased to exist. This left the riders to search for new teams or, as was the case for Millar and van Poppel, retire from the sport. The team's starting spot at the Tour de France was then ironically given to Aki–Gipiemme.

== Team roster ==
The following is a list of riders on the Le Groupement squad during the 1995 season, with age given for 1 January 1995.

Rider	Date of birth
Dominique Arnould (FRA)	19 November 1966 (aged 28)
Thierry Bourguignon (FRA)	19 December 1962 (aged 32)
Philippe Bouvatier (FRA)	12 June 1964 (aged 30)
Dominique Bozzi (FRA)	3 July 1971 (aged 23)
Jérôme Chiotti (FRA)	18 January 1972 (aged 22)
Laurent Davion (FRA)	29 February 1972 (aged 22)
David Derique (FRA)	14 July 1971 (aged 23)
Hervé Garel (FRA)	15 July 1967 (aged 27)
Frédéric Guesdon (FRA)	14 October 1971 (aged 23)
Stéphane Hennebert (BEL)	2 June 1969 (aged 25)

Rider	Date of birth
Emmanuel Hubert (FRA)	30 December 1970 (aged 24)
Oleg Kozlitine (KAZ)	22 September 1969 (aged 25)
Luc Leblanc (FRA)	4 August 1966 (aged 28)
Pascal Lino (FRA)	13 August 1966 (aged 28)
Robert Millar (GBR)	13 September 1958 (aged 36)
Ronan Pensec (FRA)	10 July 1963 (aged 31)
Anthony Rokia (FRA)	3 December 1972 (aged 22)
Jean-Paul van Poppel (NED)	30 September 1962 (aged 32)
Michel Vermote (BEL)	31 March 1963 (aged 31)
Marcel Wüst (GER)	6 August 1967 (aged 27)

== Victories ==
1995
British National Road Race Championships, Robert Millar
Tour de l'Ain, Overall, Emmanuel Hubert
Grand Prix La Marseillaise, Stéphane Hennebert
Quatre Jours de l'Aisne, stage 2, Marcel Wüst
Clásico RCN, stage 6, Marcel Wüst
Grand Prix du Midi Libre, stage 2b, Thierry Bourguignon
Tour de l'Avenir, stage 10, Emmanuel Hubert
Herald Sun Tour, stage 7, Marcel Wüst

== Bibliography ==
- Moore, Richard (2008). In Search of Robert Millar. London: HarperSport. ISBN 978-0-00-723502-5.
