= Roger Dachez =

Roger Dachez (born in 1955) is a professor at the Paris Cité University and president of the Jean-Alfred Fournier Institute in Paris. He is a physician, an historian and a freemason.

== Main publications ==
He is the author of numerous research articles on the historical origins and the traditional sources of freemasonry.

- 2001: Des maçons opératifs aux francs-maçons spéculatifs. Les origines de l'Ordre maçonnique, coll. "L'Encyclopédie maçonnique", Paris, EDIMAF, ISBN 2-903846-87-1
- 2003: Histoire de la franc-maçonnerie française, Paris, PUF, coll. "Que sais-je ?" ISBN 2-13-055807-0
- 2003: Les Francs-maçons de la légende à l'histoire, Éditions Tallandier, ISBN 2-84734-111-0
- 2003: Les Plus Belles Pages de la franc-maçonnerie, Éditions Dervy
- 2004: Histoire de la médecine de l'Antiquité au XXe, Tallandier.
- 2006: Les Mystères de Channel row, novel written with Alain Bauer, Éditions JC Lattes
- 2007: Les 100 mots de la franc-maçonnerie, written with Alain Bauer, PUF, coll. "Que sais-je ?".
- 2008: L'Invention de la franc-maçonnerie, Véga.
- 2009: Le Convent du sang, novel written with Alain Bauer, Éditions JC Lattes, coll. "Crimes et loges".
- 2010: Le Rite écossais rectifié with Jean-Marc Pétillot, PUF, coll. "Que sais-je ?", (ISBN 978-2-13-058196-3)
- 2013: Alain Bauer; Michel Barat; Roger Dachez. Les promesses de l'aube. Paris: Dervy.
- 2015: Roger Dachez (9 June 2015). Franc-maçonnerie: Régularité et reconnaissance, histoire et postures. Paris: Conform.

== See also ==
- Musée de la Franc-Maçonnerie
