= Villemaur-sur-Vanne =

Part of Aix-Villemaur-Pâlis in Grand Est, France

- Part of Aix-Villemaur-Pâlis
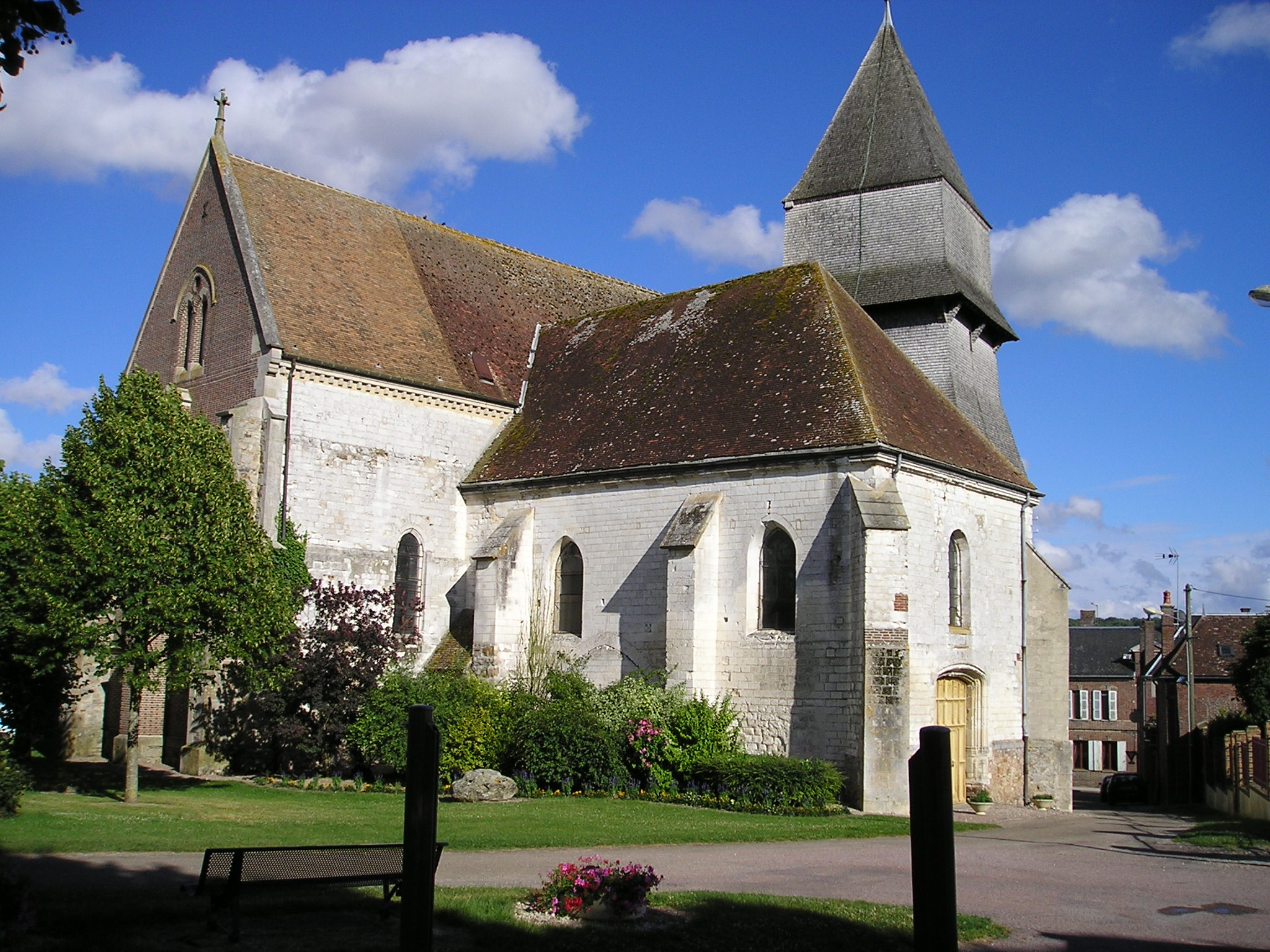

- Coat of arms
- Location of Villemaur-sur-Vanne
- Location within France Location within Grand Est
- Coordinates: 48°15′26″N 3°43′45″E
- Country: France
- Region: Grand Est
- Department: Aube
- Arrondissement: Troyes
- Canton: Aix-Villemaur-Pâlis
- Commune: Aix-Villemaur-Pâlis
- Area^{1}: 19.65 km^{2} (7.59 sq mi)
- Elevation: 138 m (453 ft)
- Highest elevation: 232 m (761 ft)
- Lowest elevation: 120 m (390 ft)
- Population (2021): 462
  - Density: 23.5/km^{2} (60.9/sq mi)
- Time zone: UTC+01:00 (CET)
  - Summer (DST): UTC+02:00 (CEST)
- Postal code: 10190
- ^{1} French Land Register data, which excludes lakes, ponds, glaciers > 1 km^{2} (0.386 sq mi or 247 acres) and river estuaries.

Villemaur-sur-Vanne (French pronunciation: [vilmɔʁ syʁ van], lit. 'Villemaur on Vanne') is a former commune in the Aube department in north-central France. On 1 January 2016, it was merged into the new commune Aix-Villemaur-Pâlis.

== Population ==
Historical population
Year	Pop.	±% p.a.
2006	475	—
2011	501	+1.07%
2021	462	−0.81%
Source: INSEE

== See also ==
- Communes of the Aube department
