= Jean-Marie Abgrall =

French psychiatrist (born 1950)

- Born: 12 April 1950 (age 76); Toulon, France
- Occupations: Psychiatrist, author, cult consultant
- Known for: Brainwashing theories

Jean-Marie Abgrall (born 12 April 1950) is a French psychiatrist, criminologist, specialist in forensic medicine, cult consultant, graduate in criminal law and anti-cultist. He has been an expert witness and has been consulted in the investigations of cults. Abgrall is known as a proponent of brainwashing theories.

== Early life ==
Abgrall was born 12 April 1950, in Toulon, France. In his youth, he was active in the AMORC Rosicrucian order, as well as a related organization, the Renewed Order of the Temple. Between 1989 and 1994, he was a member of the Green Party in France.

== Career ==
Abgrall works as a psychiatrist in private practice. He has been an expert witness when it comes to cults. Describing his opinion on cults, he stated in a television interview that, “Notwithstanding what they claim, cults are not religious movements but rather criminal movements organized by gurus who use brainwashing techniques to manipulate their victims." He was a member of the board of MILS, though resigned in May 2004. He was also an expert psychiatrist for the Court of Cassation.

Various sects, including the Aumism movement and the Raelian Movement, have opposed Abgrall. For his opposition to them, he was attacked by some groups, including the Church of Scientology, who in one instance called the secretary of the Greens and told them Abgrall was a secret service agent.

In 1996, the French government set up an observatory body to investigate cults and sects, the Parliamentary Commission on Cults in France and appointed Abgrall to the French governmental Observatory. Before this appointment, he testified before a governmental commission that produced a critical report on sects and cults, which has influenced policy development in France and internationally. He also contributed to a report on new religious movements in Belgium in 1997, where he was cited for his theories on mind control and his criticism of cult apologists. Dissatisfied with the Observatory of Sects for not being sufficiently critical, Abgrall advocated for the establishment of an official governmental "Mission to Fight Cults." This recommendation was accepted by the French government, leading to the creation of an institution aimed at monitoring minority religions in France. Alongside Alain Vivien, the Mission's president, Abgrall became a spokesperson, engaging with the media to promote its objectives. According to Dick Anthony, Abgrall helped produce official governmental reports of France and Belgium.

=== Order of the Solar Temple ===
In the 90s, Abgrall was appointed as an expert in the French investigation of the Order of the Solar Temple cult; his involvement was subject to some criticism, as the Renewed Order of the Temple group (that Abgrall had attended meetings of) had counted among its membership Luc Jouret, one of the leaders of the cult. He never personally undertook any field work related to the group, though often discussed it on television. Abgrall published two books (La mécanique des sectes and Les sectes de l'apocalypse: gourous de l'an 2000) in which he revealed confidential information about the case; Alain Leclerc, the lawyer of some of the victim's families, succeeded in getting Abgrall disqualified as a witness in the Tabachnik trial as a result. As a result of the publication of the books he was indicted for "violation of professional secrecy".

Leclerc further demanded an investigation into his finances, which was initially blocked by the courts twice, but was eventually granted. This resulted in a scandal: it was revealed that, in 1996, Landmark Worldwide (a company that had been designated a cult in the Guyard Report list of cults), displeased by their designation, contacted Abgrall to audit the organization and have their designation removed. Abgrall wrote a report on the organization arguing that they were not a cult, arguing that they were a "harmless organization", though did conclude by recognizing that the group may have had some warning signs. They were removed from the list; from the period of 2001 to 2002 Abgrall had been paid €45,699.49 by Landmark. Abgrall complained in 2004 when interviewed by Le Parisien that this had only been revealed to block his involvement in the trial, and that he had no conflict of interest as he "wrote an unfavorable report and paid [his] taxes."

== Works ==
Abgrall is the author of several books, including La mécanique des sectes (1997), Les charlatans de la santé (1998), Les sectes de l'apocalypse: gourous de l'an 2000 (1999). La mécanique des sectes was translated into English as Soul Snatchers: The Mechanics of Cults in 1999, and Les charlatans de la santé was as Healing or Stealing?: Medical Charlatans in the New Age in 2001. Susan J. Palmer retrospectively criticized the arguments the books made about the OTS, judging them a "psychological interpretation" that, given later evidence, was "premature" and "incompatible" with the facts. His works on the OTS were reviewed positively by the journalist Arnaud Bédat, who called his conclusions "extremely convincing" and said that Abgrall was ideally suited to the task. Abgrall was also sued over the books by the widow of Jacques Breyer.

== Reception ==
Dick Anthony and Thomas Robbins have written that in their view, Abgrall's theories of brainwashing are pseudoscientific, and so unsuitable for use as a basis for legal judgments in cases involving cult membership. They qualify Abgrall as the "leading psychiatric consultant to government agencies and legislative bodies concerned with controlling and suppressing non-traditional religions", noting that Abgrall's brainwashing theory has served as the primary psychiatric rationale for anti-cult laws, governmental rulings, and legal cases brought against alleged cults in Europe. Abgrall has also influenced former communist countries through the dissemination of official governmental reports from France and Belgium that he helped produce.

According to Dick Anthony, Abgrall emerged as a key "cult expert" in France, because he was the first psychiatrist in France willing to embrace brainwashing theories. He describes Abgrall's theories as "essentially identical to the pseudoscientific theory that was developed first by the American CIA, as a propaganda device to combat communism, and second as an ideological device for use by the American anti-cult movement to rationalize efforts at persecution and control of minority religious groups".

== Bibliography ==
- —— (1997). La mécanique des sectes (in French). Paris: France loisirs. ISBN 2-7441-0833-2.
  - —— (December 1999). Soul Snatchers: The Mechanics of Cults. Translated by Seberry, Alice. Algora Publishing. ISBN 1-892941-04-X.
- —— (1998). Les charlatans de la santé. Documents Payot (in French). Paris: Payot & Rivages. ISBN 2-228-89194-0.
  - —— (2001). Healing Or Stealing?: Medical Charlatans in the New Age. Algora Publishing. ISBN 1-892941-51-1.
- —— (1999). Les sectes de l'apocalypse: gourous de l'an 2000 (in French). Paris: Calmann-Lévy. ISBN 2-7021-2954-4.
- —— (2003). Tous manipulés, tous manipulateurs (in French). Paris: First ed. ISBN 2-87691-743-2.
