= New Testament Church (Hong Kong) =

Christian denomination from Hong Kong

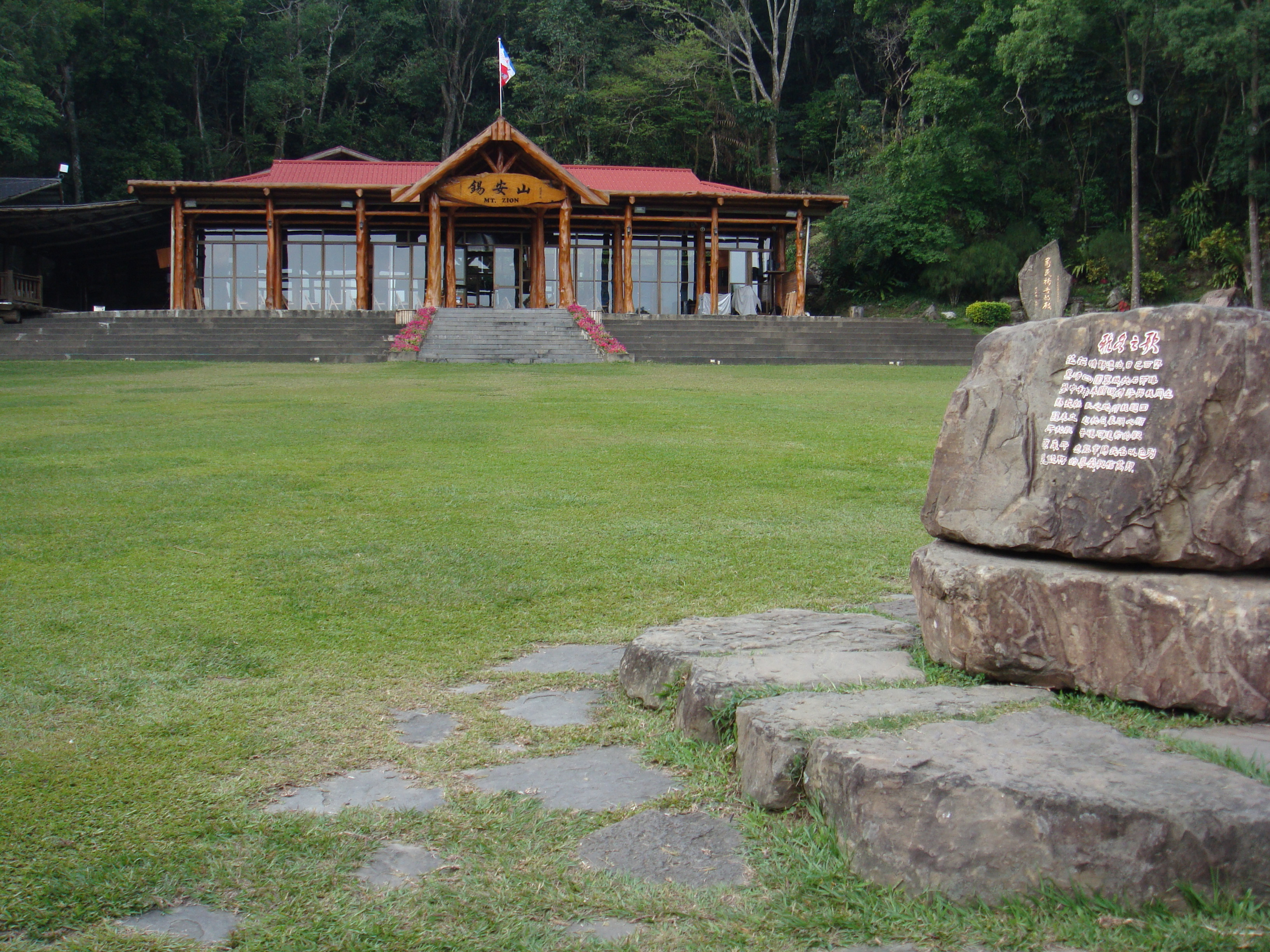
- New Testament Church, Mount Zion
- Scripture: Bible
- Moderator: Elijah Hong (洪以利亞)
- Headquarters: Mount Zion, Hsiaolin, Kaohsiung, Taiwan
- Founder: Mui Yee
- Origin: 1963; Hong Kong

New Testament Church (Chinese: 新約教會; pinyin: Xīnyuē jiàohuì) is a Christian denomination from Hong Kong, founded by the Hong Kong movie actress Mui Yee in 1963 then led by her daughter Zhang Lude (張路得, Ruth Chang). The leadership was then passed to Elijah Hong, and he settled down the New Testament Church on Mount Zion in Taiwan. The Chinese government classifies the church as heterodox.

== History ==
=== Spreads to Southeast Asia ===
After Mui Yee came out of her movie career, she returned to Christianity in 1957. Since 1959, Mui Yee has travelled across Southeast Asia to preach the gospel and develop her church. However, she was not trained formally as a preacher. In 1963, just after Mui Yee founded the New Testament Church, she was invited to Malaysia to conduct rallies in Kuala Lumpur, Ipoh, and Penang. With the help of the Assemblies of God (AOG), a Pentecostal denomination, she continued to spread her ideas in Malaysia and Singapore. She stressed glossolalia (speaking in tongues), healing, and prophecy, becoming a sensation within Chinese Christian circles. In her meetings, she condemned Chinese religious practices.

In Singapore, she also preached the Spirit-baptism in her meetings; however, some non-Pentecostal Christians were not accepted to go back into their own churches after receiving the Spirit-baptism from Mui Yee. Mui Yee persuaded people to leave their own churches and form independent churches associated with the New Testament Church. Churches were started in Kuala Lumpur, Ipoh, Klang, Penang, and Sitiawan. NTC had some connection with these churches in the early post-independence period but then split into a group of individual churches. It resulted in the creation of the New Testament Churches in the 1960s. For example, Brethren Elder Ten Phai Lian of Burmah Road Gospel Hall started the Church of Penang, which was later named the Charismatic Church of Penang; the Church of Singapore became the first independent charismatic church.

=== Leadership ===
Mui Yee travelled across Southeast Asia and she flew to Taiwan in 1965, meeting with Hong Sanqi, also known as Elijah Hong. By that time, she had already been diagnosed with tongue cancer. As Mui Yee had difficulties speaking during the last stage of the cancer, she was unable to preach through voice; she then used writing instead. To represent her transition of ministry to Elijah, she prayed for Elijah Hong with his hands held tightly and put her forehead against his forehead, hoping that he could carry on her mission and revival. Mui Yee gave the mantle of leadership of the church to Hong in the farewell, photographed by Hong and his associates.

Mui Yee died of tongue cancer on 17 August 1966. She lived only seven years since she became a Pentecostal. She prophesied that she would be resurrected three days after she died. However, her prophecy seemed not to be fulfilled, and it led to further anti-Pentecostal sentiment within mainline Chinese Christian circles. She had prophesied that there would be a great revival in 1966, after her death.

After Mui Yee's death, leadership was passed to her daughter, Zhang Lude. Since Zhang Lude took over the leadership, the New Testament Church has become more conservative, especially due to Zhang Lude's family problems and her husband.

==== Elijah Hong became the main leader ====
Zhang Lude soon renounced her leadership in the NTC and moved to California. After Zhang Lude left the Church, Hong Sanqi (洪三期), also known as Elijah Hong (洪以利亞), emerged as the main leader from 1976. Hong founded a Holy Mountain retreat (圣山) and Stone Tablet Church (石牌教會) in Kaohsiung. The New Testament Church is currently based at Mount Zion in Southern Taiwan, which "is both a pilgrimage destination and nature-based utopian community of several hundred adherents" and, the church believes, the setting for the impending Great Tribulation. The church believes that God is only available through the prophet and only the prophet can talk to God and only him can decipher the Bible. They encouraged children to leave the school as they believe the Bible is the only education that the children should receive. They also believe that the New Testament Church is the real church and all other churches are not true to the Bible.

In 1988, Zuo Kun (左坤), a former leader of the Church, organized a splinter group known as The Blood and Water of Jesus Christ and Holy Spirit Full Gospel Evangelistic Band (血水聖靈全備福音布道團), or The Church Rebuilt by the Holy Spirit (聖靈重建教会), and in 1989 started clandestine missions to mainland China.

== Beliefs ==
=== The Lord's Maidservant Sister and God's Servant Brother Elijah Hong ===
NTC followers believe that God chose Mui Yee as the Prophet of All Nations. God gave Mui Yee a group of co-workers to form a gospel crusading team of Jesus Christ, known as the Grace of Jesus Christ Crusade (GJCC). NTC followers believe that Brother Elijah was raised up to succeed Mui Yee's ministry after she rested in the Lord in 1966. They treat Hong as the "God's Chosen Prophet of All Nations". Elijah Hong called himself the "Latter-day Elijah," "Chief Apostle," "God's Chosen Prophet of All Nations", and claimed that he is the last prophet appointed by God.

=== Mount Zion is the venue for the heavenly descent of Jesus Christ ===
After Elijah Hong took control of the NTC, he shifted the headquarters to Mount Zion, which is located in Hsiaolin, Kaohsiung, Taiwan. It is home to 300 people who operate an organic farm and allows NTC followers to make pilgrimages. Elijah Hong settled down on this mountain in 1979 and proclaimed: "Mount Zion in Hasiolin, Kaohsiung, Taiwan is the mountain of the Lord, the lord house as prophesied in the Book of Isaiah! All nations shall flow to this mountain!". NTC followers believe that God has forsaken the traditional Mount Zion in Israel, especially due to the Jews rejecting Christ, and the new Mount Zion in Taiwan is now the real Mount Zion. They believe that Mount Zion is the mountain that God would show them, a new heaven and the millennial kingdom. They also believe that Jesus Christ would return to Mount Zion at his second coming. Hong pledged to the Lord that they would wait on Mount Zion to see Jesus Christ show them a new prophet.

=== The One and Only True God ===
According to Mui Yee's theology, there are only two groups of people—one belonging to God, one belonging to Devil. It is consistent with the thinking of Hong, the leader of New Testament Church, as he claimed that his church is the only true church, others are satanic. Therefore, the NTC followers believe that Jesus Christ is the only god they have, there are no other saviour. Mui Yee believed that God is truly one but manifests himself in three different forms. It is said that Jesus Christ is triune, combining the Holy Father, the Holy Son, and they Holy Spirit in one.

=== Gospel ===
NTC stated that Christians have to complete the witness of blood, the witness of water, and the witness of the Holy Spirit so as to receive the gospel in its fullness. According to the Church's theology, blood represents Jesus's death on the cross, water represents baptism, and spirit represents the manifestation of 'spiritual gifts', which means glossolalia. Kong wrote in 1966, "When we accept Jesus as our personal savior we receive not only Blood (regeneration) and water baptism (baptism and obedience to the word of God) but also the Baptism with the Holy Spirit." NTC leaders were on the concept that individuals can only understand the message of the Bible after receiving the full gospel, meaning only NTC followers can truly understand the doctrines of the church. NTC followers then conclude that NTC is the only orthodox church as they said they are the only church that received the full gospel. Mui Yee wrote A life to Testify to the Full Gospel of Jesus Christ, listing out a set of doctrines for NTC supporters to study and follow.

==== The Witness of Blood ====
As NTC believes that there is only one God, people who worship other gods, disrespect or disbelieve in God, or act immorally are treated as having committed sin. ‘But whosoever will repent and confess his sins humbly before and receive Jesus as his Saviour shall be forgiven and shall be given the blessing of grace’ (Kong 1966:15) Mui Yee said that "dirt on our bodies can be washed away but the sin in our hearts can only be cleansed by the Blood of Christ. The cleaning process is the confession of all sins to Christ." The Witness of Blood means one's uncleanness will be cleaned with the precious blood of Jesus Christ as Jesus Christ shed his blood for the remission of sins.

==== The Witness of Water ====
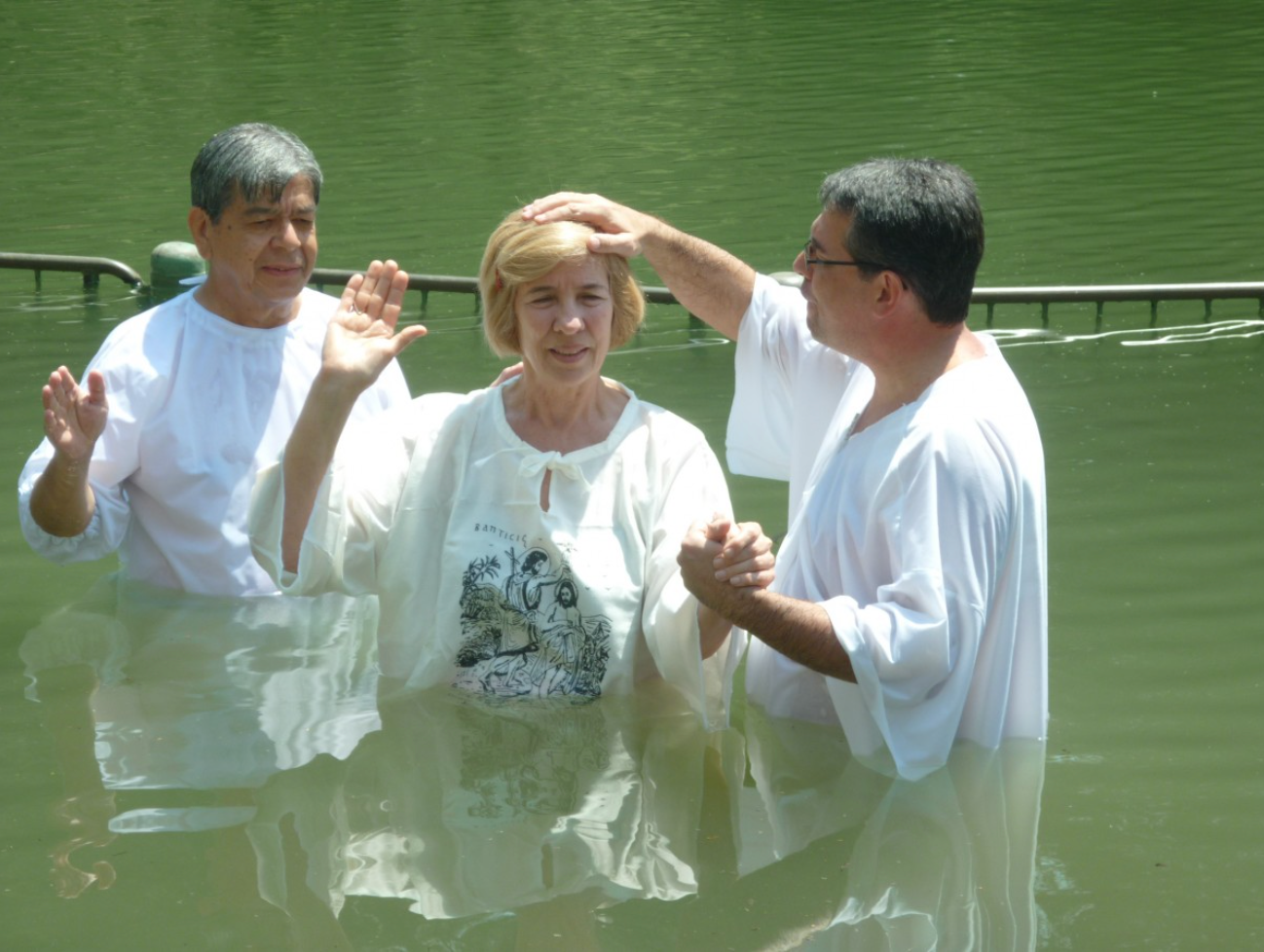
Water baptism

According to the Bible, "He who believes and is baptised will be saved." Water baptism is the first step towards the witness of water. It is a sign of entrance into the church and a practical step to salvation. The full immersion in water represents the individual's life, death, burial, and resurrection. NTC believes that people will obey the Lord's truth and command to the end after the witness of water.

==== The Witness of Holy Spirit ====
The last instruction given by the Lord is to be baptised with the Holy Spirit. Pi (1977) mentioned that spirit baptism is the life experience of the saints of the pristine church. It just came from a sound from heaven suddenly and people will be filled with the Holy Spirit. Mui Yee, the Lord's maid servant, has once received the Holy Spirit baptism from God. If a Christian is baptised in the Holy Spirit, they will be able to demonstrate it by speaking tongue. Mui Yee taught the spirit baptism accompanied by speaking tongue in many revival meetings in churches in Southeast Asia, such as Hong Kong, Taiwan, Malaysia, and Singapore. Mui Yee said "After a Christian receives the Holy Spirit, he will have a host of spiritual blessings and these include the power to love, to witness and to serve him."

== Accusation of being a cult ==
Popular representations of the New Religious Movement are accused as being 'cults'. It refers to leaders that persuade no thinking person to do something voluntarily. The New Testament Church is officially alleged as 'cult' by the Chinese government. The Chinese government stated that if the organisation have the below characteristics, it will be treated as a cult.

1. Using the name of a religion or qigong to establish an illegal organisation.
2. Deifies its leaders.
3. Initiates and spreads superstitions and cultic beliefs.
4. Utilises various means to fabricate and spread superstitions and cultic beliefs to excite doubts and deceive the people, and recruit and control its members.
5. Engages in an organised manner to disturb social order.

== Bibliography ==
- Anderson, A. (2013) An Introduction to Pentecostalism: Global Charismatic Christianity. p. 129. ISBN 9781139524063
- Anderson, A. (2017) Global Chinese Pentecostal and Charismatic Christianity. p. 287. ISBN 9789004336896
- Anderson, A. (2013) To the Ends of the Earth: Pentecostalism and the transformation of World Christianity. p. 107. ISBN 9780195386431
- 'Carrying on the Revival and Mission'. (2007) Grace of Jesus Christ Crusade. Retrieved from https://ziongjcc.org/en/prophet/prophet_04.html
- Chan, Kim-Kwong. (2017) City Harvest Church of Singapore: An Ecclesial Paradigm for Pentecostalism in the Postmodern World. In Global Chinese Pentecostal and Charismatic Christianity. pp. 286–308. ISBN 9004336893.
- China Source Team (2015) Cults and Christianity in China. China Source. Retrieved from https://www.chinasource.org/resource-library/chinese-church-voices/cults-and-christianity-in-china/
- Dunn, Emily (2015). Lightning from the East: Heterodoxy and Christianity in Contemporary China. Brill. pp. 39–42. ISBN 9789004297241.
- Eds (2012). Flows of Faith: Religious Reach and Community in Asia and the Pacific. p. 186. ISBN 978-9400729315.
- Eds. (2015). The Anthropology of Global Pentecostalism and Evangelicalism. ISBN 9780814772591.
- Eds. (2019). Asia Pacific Pentecostalism from Global Pentecostal and Charismatic Studies. Leiden, The Netherlands: Brill. doi: https://doi.org/10.1163/9789004396708
- Farrelly, P. (2010). Mount Zion and Typhoon Morakot: a new religious movement’s response to a natural disaster, Religioscope. Retrieved from: https://english.religion.info/2010/04/01/taiwan-mount-zion-and-typhoon-morakot-a-new-religious-movements-response-to-a-natural-disaster/
- Farrelly, Paul J. (January 20, 2012). "The New Testament Church and Mount Zion in Taiwan". Flows of Faith. Springer. pp. 183–200. doi:10.1007/978-94-007-2932-2_11 ISBN 978-94-007-2932-2.
- Farrelly, Paul (2014). The New Testament Church and Mount Zion in Taiwan. ISBN 978-94-007-2932-2.
- Fenggang Yang, Religion in China: Survival and Revival under Communist Rule, 2011, Oxford University Press, ISBN 9780199735648, pp. 102–195
- FOREFEUROPE (2018). "CHINA'S BLACKLIST OF FORBIDDEN RELIGIONS – The Chinese Communist Party's War on Religious Liberty". FOREFEUROPE. Retrieved from: https://foref-europe.org/blog/2018/10/15/chinas-blacklist-of-forbidden-religions/
- Fox, Judith (2005). New religious movement. In J. R. Hinnells (Ed.), The Routledge companion to the study of religion. pp. 323–327. ISBN 9780415473286.
- "Grace of Jesus Christ". Grace of Jesus Christ. Retrieved from: https://ziongjcc.org/en/prophet/prophet_03.html
- Lai, Ah Eng (2008). Religious Diversity in Singapore. ISEAS/ IPS. p. 119. ISBN 978-981-230-753-8.
- Lim, Timothy (2015). Pentecostalism in Singapore and Malaysia: Past, Present and Future In book: Global Renewal Christianity: Spirit- Empowered Movements, Past, Present, and Future, vol. 1: Asia and Oceania. Charisma House. pp. 126–135. ISBN 9781629986890.
- Ling, May (2007). Pentecostal Theology for the Twenty-First Century (Ashgate New Critical Thinking in Religion, Theology and Biblical Studies). ISBN 9780754687368.
- "Mark 16:16". Bible Hub. Retrieved from: https://biblehub.com/mark/16-16.html
- ‘Mui Yee’, (2005). Leisure and Cultural Service Department of Hong Kong. Retrieved from https://www.lcsd.gov.hk/CE/CulturalService/HKFA/documents/2005525/11224027/ Mui%2BYee_e.pdf
- "New Testament Church". BillionBibles. Retrieved from: https://www.billionbibles.com/china/new-testament-church.html
- Pi, V,. (1977.) The Truth on Water Baptism. Grace of Jesus Christ Crusade. Retrieved from: https://media.ziongjcc.org/zion/en/pdf/booklet/03-TruthOnWaterBaptism.pdf
- Pi, V., (1977). The Truth on Spirit Baptism. Grace of Jesus Christ Crusade. Retrieved from: https://media.ziongjcc.org/zion/en/pdf/booklet/02-TruthOnSpiritBaptism.pdf
- Rubinstein, Murray A. (1994). The Other Taiwan, 1945-92. ISBN 9781563241932.
- "The Lord's Maid servant Sister Kong Duen Yee". (2007) Grace of Jesus Christ. Retrieved from: https://ziongjcc.org/en/prophet/prophet_02.html
- "The Full Gospel". (2007) Grace of Jesus Christ. Retrieved from: https://ziongjcc.org/en/gospel/gospel_03.html
- "The Witness of Blood". (2007) Grace of Jesus Christ. Retrieved from: https://ziongjcc.org/en/gospel/gospel_03_blood.html
- Trev, Naudha (2012) Kong Duen-Yee. ISBN 978-620-0-87317-0.
- Wellum, Stephen. "Water Baptism". The Gospel Coalition. Retrieved from: https://www.thegospelcoalition.org/essay/water-baptism/
- Wong, Paulus, (2019). "Kong, Duen Yee (Mui Yee)", in: Brill's Encyclopedia of Global Pentecostalism Online, Edited by: Michael Wilkinson, Connie Au, Jörg Haustein, Todd M. Johnson. Consulted online on 18 March 2021 http://dx.doi.org/10.1163/2589-3807_EGPO_COM_040644
