= Pâlis =

Commune in Aube, France

Palis
- Part of Aix-Villemaur-Pâlis
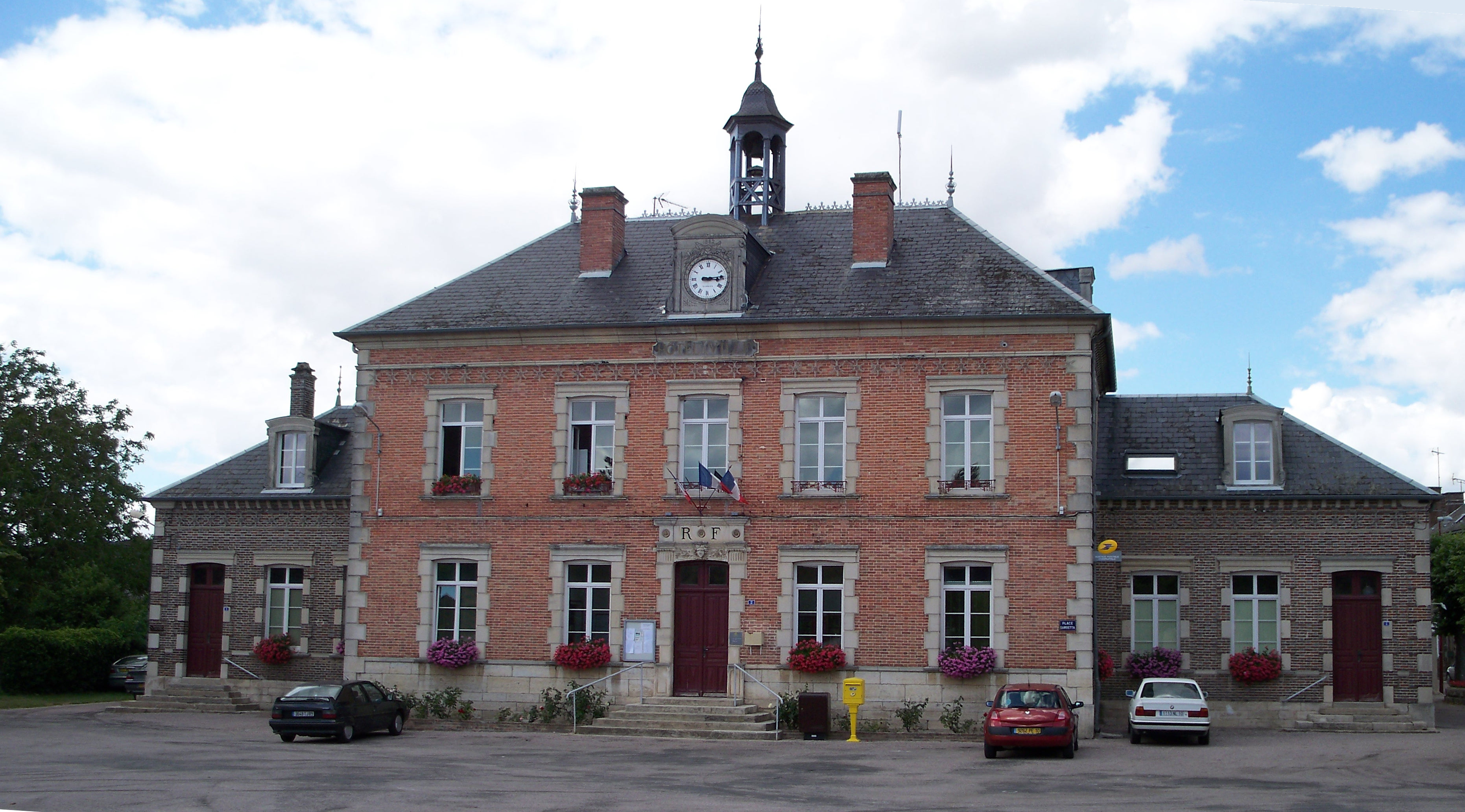
- Town hall
- Location of Palis
- Location within France Location within Grand Est
- Coordinates: 48°17′19″N 3°42′34″E
- Country: France
- Region: Grand Est
- Department: Aube
- Arrondissement: Troyes
- Canton: Aix-Villemaur-Pâlis
- Commune: Aix-Villemaur-Pâlis
- Area^{1}: 20.89 km^{2} (8.07 sq mi)
- Elevation: 166 m (545 ft)
- Highest elevation: 269 m (883 ft)
- Lowest elevation: 165 m (541 ft)
- Population (2021): 709
  - Density: 33.9/km^{2} (87.9/sq mi)
- Time zone: UTC+01:00 (CET)
  - Summer (DST): UTC+02:00 (CEST)
- Postal code: 10190
- ^{1} French Land Register data, which excludes lakes, ponds, glaciers > 1 km^{2} (0.386 sq mi or 247 acres) and river estuaries.

Pâlis (French pronunciation: [palis]), officially Palis, is a former commune in the Aube department in north-central France. On 1 January 2016, it was merged into the new commune Aix-Villemaur-Pâlis.

== Population ==
Historical population
Year	Pop.	±% p.a.
2006	602	—
2011	629	+0.88%
2021	709	+1.20%
Source: INSEE

== See also ==
- Communes of the Aube department
