= Mui Yee =

Hong Kong actress (1923–1966)

- Chinese: 梅绮
- Born: 1923; Beijing, China
- Died: 17 August 1966 (aged 42–43); British Hong Kong
- Other name: Kong Duen-yee
- Occupations: Actress; preacher
- Years active: 1937–1962

Kong Duen-yee (Chinese: 江端儀; pinyin: Jiāng Duānyí; 1923 – 17 August 1966), known then as the actress Mui Yee (梅绮; Méi Qí), was a Chinese movie star in Hong Kong.

== Career ==
=== Entertainment ===
In 1937, Mui became an actress in Hong Kong films. Mui appeared in The Sentimental Woman (aka The Heartbroken Woman), a 1937 Romance film directed by So Yi and Liu Shut. In several films, Mui depicted a wealthy wife scorned and other romantic characters. Mui's film career ran throughout the 1950s, at a time when mainstream cinema in Hong Kong was just beginning to challenge the conservative Asian culture. Mui's last film was Flesh and Blood (aka Renegade, The Criminals), a 1963 film directed by Leung Fung. Mui is credited with over 140 films.

In 1960, Mui was diagnosed with tongue cancer, she retired from acting and decided to become a preacher as which she acted for about seven years.

=== Christian leader ===
In 1963, facing certain death, Kong turned from a worldly, carnal lifestyle to religion and reacted to the Pentecostal revival which had reached Asia to start a Church called the New Testament Church (NTC). She was appointed a prophetess and an Apostle by God to continue the work of the book of Acts in the Bible. In addition to teaching "speaking in tongues" as a means of salvation, she began promulgating "The Blood, Water and Holy Spirit", of which God had inspired her from her Bible readings of 1 John 5:6-8, but is actually a teaching that many Christians have always held dear: that Jesus shed His blood for the remission of sins, began His ministry when He was baptized, and ended His ministry when He sent down the Holy Spirit to build His church on the Day of Pentecost. (It is believed by Bible scholars that the Apostle John wrote this letter to refute some erroneous beliefs of the Gnostics that Jesus was just a man and not God-in-the-flesh.)

Kong also taught her primarily female followers (of which several were former fans) teachings that bordered on numerology, including the "7.21 Inspiration" (referring to July 21), which she called the "rebuilding of the New Testament Church by the Holy Spirit." Kong prophesied that her religious group would become famous and cause worldwide revival. Upon her gruesome death, she was succeeded by her daughter Ruth Chang. But soon afterwards Ruth was convinced by her husband that her mother's teachings were heretical and that the NTC sect is a cult. Chang then moved to Southern California and became a pastor of a Pentecostal Christian church (Assemblies of God). Elijah Hong then succeeded her, undoing the damages left by Chang.

== Personal life ==
Kong's ancestral place is in Nanhai County (defunct), Guangdong. She battled with tongue cancer and finally succumbed to the ailment in 1966.

== Filmography ==
=== Films ===
- 1937 War and Survival
- 1937 The Sentimental Woman
- 1938 Hongling Beige
- 1938 The Beautiful Puppet
- 1938 Yanzhi Lei
- 1939 Nu ren shi jie
- 1940 Changsheng Gongzhu
- 1940 Cong xin suo yu
- 1941 Xiao Laohu
- 1941 Ye Shang Hai
- 1941 Love in the Schoolyard
- 1941 Qian jin zhi zi
- 1949 Love and Hate on the Sea
- 1949 Dead End Case
- 1950 Laughter and Tears
- 1950 Kowloon City Fire
- 1952 Pin jian fu qi bai shi shuai
- 1952 Leng yue ban lang gui
- 1952 A Couple in Love - Fung Pui Jan
- 1953 The Guiding Light
- 1953 Family - Yuen-yi
- 1953 Death of a Beauty - Lee Git Ching
- 1953 Bird in the Sunset
- 1953 In the Face of Demolition - Fong
- 1953 Bright Night - Chen Bailu
- 1953 Things of the Past
- 1954 The Noble Family - Luk Wan-Sin
- 1954 Da di
- 1954 Da lei yu
- 1954: Orchid of the Valley
- 1954: An Unforgettable Song
- 1954: The Hills Divide Us
- 1954: Zi shu nu - Ah Jan
- 1955 Love (Part 1)
- 1955 Love (Part 2)
- 1955 An Orphan's Tragedy - Rainbow, Choi-Hung
- 1955 Love Trilogy
- 1955: The Next Generation
- 1955: My Wife, My Wife
- 1955: The Hypocritical Heart - Mui Wan Kam
- 1955 The Pagoda of Long Life
- 1955 Broken Spring Dreams
- 1955 The Devoted Lover
- 1955 Honeymoon
- 1956 The Sad Wife in a Grand House
- 1956 Romance at the Western Chamber
- 1956 The Precious Lotus Lamp
- 1956 Fire
- 1956 The Peacock's Sad Tale
- 1956 Madam Mei
- 1956 The King and the Beauty - Ho Wai-lan
- 1956 Beauty in the Mist
- 1957 The Thunderstorm - Tse Fung
- 1957 The Story of Liang Tianlai
- 1957 Pearl's Reconciliation - Fox Spirit Pak Ling-sin
- 1957 The Lotus Lamp
- 1957 The Lizhi's Tale
- 1957 Her Tragic Death
- 1957 The Fox-Spirit's Romance
- 1957 Escorting Lady Jing On A 1,000 Mile Journey
- 1957 The Case of the Blood Stain
- 1958 Story of the Vulture Conqueror
- 1958 A Scholar Redeems His Love
- 1958 The Prince's Romantic Affairs
- 1958 Prince of Thieves (The Sequel)
- 1958 The Lotus Lantern (Part 3)
- 1958 Marriage on the Rocks (婚變) - Ng Suet-Man (Credited as Mui Yee)
- 1959 Beauty Slain By The Sword
- 1959 Money (aka Qian) - Hung's wife, Mrs. Hung.
- 1959 The Road (aka Lo) - Ah Chui.
- 1959 Seven Swordsman Leave Tianshan
- 1960 Magic Lamp
- 1960 Nazha sheshan jiu mu - Na Cha's Mother
- 1962 The Reunion
- 1963 Flesh and Blood (aka Renegade, the Criminals)
