= Raphaël Liogier =

French sociologist and philosopher (born 1967)

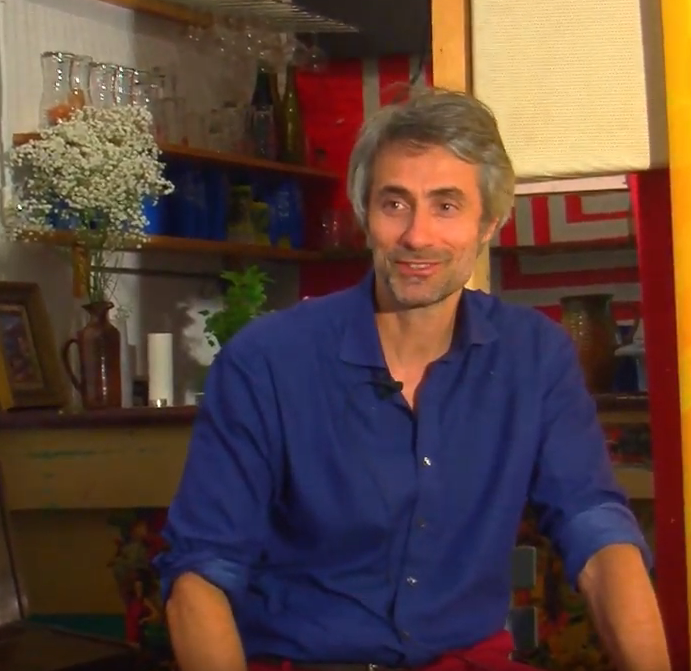
- Raphaël Liogier in 2019
- Born: 1967 (age 58–59); France
- Education: Sciences Po Aix
- Occupations: Sociologist; Philosopher

Raphaël Liogier (born in 1967) is a French sociologist and philosopher. He received his PhD in social sciences at the University Paul Cézanne (Aix-Marseille) in France, where he also received master's degrees in public law and in political science. Other degrees include a degree in philosophy from the University of Provence, and a Masters of Science (MSC) by research in philosophy from the University of Edinburgh in Scotland. Liogier has also studied social sciences as a visiting undergraduate at the University of California at Berkeley.

He is a university professor at the Institut d'études politiques d'Aix-en-Provence. He has also been appointed to lecture at the International College of Philosophy (CIPh) in Paris (Academic and Research Institution created by the French philosopher Jacques Derrida to promote new ideas). Liogier ran the Observatoire du religieux from 2006 to 2014, which is the first European Social Sciences Research Center to have studied both the rise of the new Salafism (new Islamic fundamentalism) among young western Muslims and the rise of new groups of young people using Islam as an anti-social flag in order to justify violent behavior. Liogier was the first expert to be interviewed by the French Parliament after the Charlie Hebdo terrorist attack in January 2015.

He is also a research scholar attached to the University of Paris 10 (Paris-Nanterre). He serves as a board member on the scientific journal Social Compass, and is one of the twelve members of the International Commission for Peace Research at UNESCO. He has been invited as a visiting professor by several universities, mainly in North America, Europe, India and Australia. In 2015 he had a one-year appointment as visiting professor at the University of Louvain in Belgium in the Academic Chair of Prospective Anthropology (title of the course : « The Evolution of Mankind Narrative in the 21st Century related to the development of Technosciences »).

Liogier wrote his thesis on Buddhism under the direction of Bruno Étienne, a professor at the Institut d'études politiques d'Aix-en-Provence, and has among other things published a book on secularism in 2006. He works particularly on the issues related to Islam and cults and wrote many articles on religious topics including Pentecostalism, Catholicism and Soka Gakkai. He also criticizes the work made by MIVILUDES.

His work can be divided into three main areas of study:

1. Why do we need to believe? Where does the desire to believe come from ? Is science possible without any belief? What is the difference between "knowing" and « believing » ?
2. The construction of new mythologies in our current global world (the importance of the Internet for sharing dreams, desires and anguish). The global circulation of images, desires and frustrations (related to new global forms of violence : cyber- terrorism for instance).
3. The impact of technoscience over human narrative (the significance of human technological enhancement) and on human concrete reality (the evolution of the desire to work; the evolution of the relation with our natural environment).

Liogier co-authored several articles on the theme of religion. He has published more than a hundred scientific articles and sixteen books. He has recently published a book on violence and the evolution of religious and cultural identity in a global world (La guerre des civilisations n'aura pas lieu. Coexistence et violence au XXIème siècle [The War of Civilizations will not take place. Coexistence and Violence in the 21st Century], 2017; and a book about the necessity to radically transform our social and economic system due to the development of artificial intelligence and the Internet (Sans Emploi. Condition de l'homme postindustriel [Unemployed. The Postindustrial Man Condition], 2017).

He appears regularly on French national TV and radio shows. He has published numerous articles in national and international mainstream newspapers. One of his article published in Le Monde was later translated and published in English on the Blog of the London School of Economics (LSE).

His analysis of the 2017 French election appeared in an op-ed in The New York Times International.

Some of his scientific work is published in English, including the International Social Science Journal.

The Stanford University review Occasion published his article after the Charlie Hebdo attack in Paris in 2015.

In 2011, The Harvard International Review published a summary of his study on the "Myth of Islamization and European Decadence".

Some of his more recent work on hypermodern identities (artificial intelligence and human identity; transhumanist imaginary structure) has been published in the international academic journal Social Compass. Review in English of his book on French "laïcité", see Contemporary Sociology, Vol. 39,3, pp. 319–320 (author of the review : Margarita Mooney) There was a review in English of his book Souci de soi, conscience du monde. Vers une religion globale (Self care, World Awareness. Towards a Global Religion ?).

Commentary in English on his work can be found on the internet site World Religion Watch.

One book, by British anthropologist Jonathan Benthall, has been explicitly inspired by Liogier's work, according to the author himself.

== Bibliography by Liogier ==
- Heart of Maleness, 2020, trans. from the French by Antony Shugaar. New York: Other Press. Originally published in French as Descente au cœur du mâle in 2018 by Les liens qui libèrent, Paris.
- Sans emploi. Condition de l'homme postindustriel, Les liens qui libèrent, 2016 (Unemployed. The Condition of Postindustrial Man)
- La guerre des civilisations n'aura pas lieu : coexistence et violence au xxie siècle, CNRS Éditions, 2016 (The War of Civilization will not take place. Coexistence and violence in the XXIrst Century). Spanish / Mexican Edition.
- Le Complexe de Suez. Le vrai déclin français (et du continent européen), éditions du Bord de l'eau, 2015 (The Suez Complex. French and European Real Decline).
- Ce populisme qui vient (conversation avec Régis Meyran), Paris, Textuel, coll. « Conversations pour demain », 2013, (The Coming Populism)
- Laicidad y ciencia, Ediciones de la Universidad Nacional Autonoma De México, 2013, (Science and Political Secularism)
- Le Mythe de l'islamisation, essai sur une obsession collective, Le Seuil, 2012, New Paperback Edition 2016 (The Myth of Islamization. Essay on a Collective Obsession). Turkish Edition.
- Souci de soi, conscience du monde. Vers une religion globale ?, Armand Colin, 2012 (Self care, World Awareness. Towards a global religion ?), Portuguese / Brazilian Edition.
- Les Évidences universelles, Éditions de la Librairie de la Galerie, 2011 (The Universal Prejudices)
- Sacrée médecine : histoire et devenir d'un sanctuaire de la Raison, avec Jean Baubérot, Entrelacs, 2011 (Damned Medecine ! History and evolution of a Rational Sanctuary)
- Religion et valeurs en France et en Europe (with Claude Dargent and Yannick Fer), L'Harmattan, 2009 (Religion and Values in France and Europe)
- À la rencontre du Dalaï-Lama. Mythe, vie et pensée d'un contemporain insolite, Flammarion, Paris, 2008 (Meeting with the Dalaï-lama. Myth, Life and Ideas of an Unusual Mind)
- Le Bouddhisme et ses normes, Presses universitaires de Strasbourg, 2006 (Buddhism and its traditional regulations)
- Une laïcité "légitime", la France et ses religions d'État, Médicis Entrelas, March 2006 ». (« Legitimate » Secularism. France and its Religions)
- Géopolitique du christianisme (with Blandine Chelini-Pont), Ellipses, 2003 (The Geopolitics of Christianity)
- Le Bouddhisme mondialisé. Une perspective sociologique sur la globalisation du religieux, Ellipses, 2003 (Buddhism gone Global. A Sociological Perspective)
- Jésus, Bouddha d'Occident, Calmann-Lévy, 1999 (Jesus, Buddha of the West)
- Être bouddhiste en France aujourd'hui, (with Bruno Étienne), Hachette, 1997, New Edition in Paperback 2004 (Buddhism in France Today)
