= Bruno Étienne =

French sociologist, freemason and political analyst

- Born: 6 November 1937; La Tronche, France
- Died: 4 March 2009 (aged 71); Aix-en-Provence, France
- Education: Lycée Thiers; Tunis University; Sciences Po Aix
- Occupation: Sociologist

Bruno Étienne (born in 1937 in La Tronche, Isère, died in Aix-en-Provence on 4 March 2009 after a cancer) was a French sociologist, freemason and a political analyst. He was a specialist of Algeria, Islam and anthropology of the religious and masonic fact.

== Biography ==
=== Youth and Education ===
He graduated in Arabic-language and political sciences at the Institut d'études politiques d'Aix-en-Provence and the University of Tunis. Bruno Étienne was a researcher in Cairo and was a teacher at the ENA-Algiers, at the law faculty of Algiers and the universities of Casablanca and Marmara. He was also director of researches at the CNRS.

Teacher at the Institut d'études politiques d'Aix-en-Provence, he was the founder and was director until 2006 of the Observatoire du religieux. Bruno Étienne was also member of the Institut universitaire de France.

Bruno Étienne was the founder of a school of researchers in Aix-en-Provence including Raphaël Liogier, Jocelyne Cesari and Frank Fregosi. Gilles Kepel was also under his influence.

He was member of the Grand Orient de France and was a chevalier of the Légion d'honneur.

== Publications ==
By Bruno Étienne

- L'islamisme radical, Paris, LGF, 1989.
- La France et l'islam, Paris, Hachette, 1989.
- Abdelkader, Paris, Hachette, 1994.
- Une grenade entrouverte, La Tour d'Aigue, Aube ed., 1999.
- L'Islam en France, Paris, CNRS Editions, 2000.
- Ils ont rasé la Mésopotamie : du droit de coloniser au devoir d'ingérence, Paris, Eshel, 2000.
- Les amants de l'apocalypse, La Tour d'Aigue, Aube ed., 2002.
- L'Initiation, Paris, Dervy, 2002.
- La France face aux sectes, Paris, Hachette, 2002.
- Islam, les questions qui fâchent, Paris, Bayard, 2003.
- Abd el-Kader : Le Magnanime (with François Pouillon), Paris, Gallimard, coll. "Découvertes Gallimard" (n° 431), 2003.
- La voie de la main nue : Initiation et karaté-do, Paris, Dervy, 2004.
- Être bouddhiste en France aujourd'hui (with Raphaël Liogier), Paris, Hachette, 2004.
- Heureux comme Dieu en France ? : La République face aux religions, Paris, Bayard, 2005.
- Pour retrouver la parole : Le retour des frères (with Alain Bauer, Roger Dachez and Michel Maffesoli), La Table Ronde, 2006.
- La spiritualité maçonnique : Pour redonner du sens à la vie, Paris, Dervy, 2006.
- Une voie pour l'occident, Dervy 2000
