= Aumism =

Religious sect

- Formation: 1969
- Founder: Gilbert Bourdin
- Type: New religious movement (syncretic, drawing heavily on Hinduism)
- Headquarters: Mandarom Shambhasalem, near Castellane, France
- Members: ~400 (down from a peak of ~1,200)
- Cosmoplanetary Messiah: Gilbert Bourdin (1990–1998)

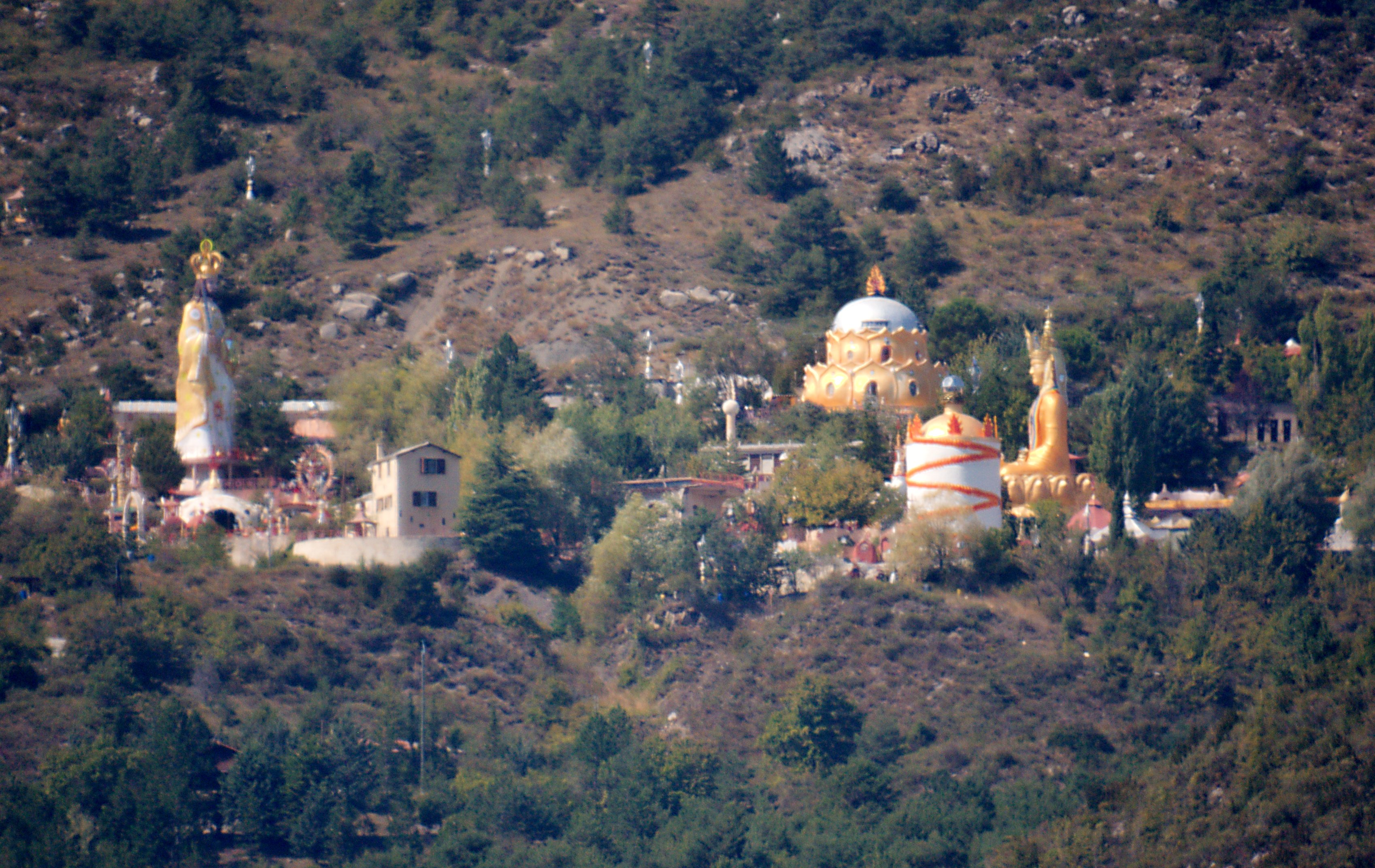
Mandarom, seen from the other side of Castillon Lake

Aumism is a minor religious sect founded in 1969 by Gilbert Bourdin (1923–1998). Centered on the "holy city" of Mandarom, near Castellane in the French Alps, it has approximately 400 members, down from 1200 at its peak. It is a synthesis of a number of religions, most prominently Hinduism. Its name derives from the mystical "aum" sound used in Hindu meditation, which is said to be the sound that gave birth to all other sounds. There is debate about whether Bourdin's founding of the Ashram (Holy City) of Mandarom in 1969 marked the beginning of the Aumist movement.

== History ==
Gilbert Bourdin (June 25th, 1923 – March 19th, 1998), also known by several other names such as Hamsananda Sarasvati, Imam Mahdi Manarah, Melkitsedeq, and "His Holiness Lord Hamsah Manarahthe(Manarah)", is the founder of the Aumist movement. He was born in Martinique. Bourdin spent time in the French Civil Service before engaging in a spiritual journey that led him to Aumism. Bourdin founded the Aumist movement in the mid-to-late 1900s after immersing himself in many religions; namely Shingon Buddhism, Indian Sufism, Jainism, and Tibetan Buddhism. Bourdin was influenced by Indian Guru Swami Sivananda Sarasvati after traveling to Rishikesh in 1961 where he was initiated as a sannyasin and received the name Hamsananda Sarasvati. This marked the beginning of a spiritual journey, where Bourdin spent time learning from and practicing multiple religions. Bourdin returned to France in 1962 where he spent that winter in a cave in Vaucluse. There, he taught yoga to his very first disciples and afterwards published multiple books on yoga, the first of which was titled Naturopathie et Yoga. In 1967, Bourdin founded the Association of the Knights of the Golden Lotus, which later became the Association of the Triumphant Vajra. In 1969, Bourdin founded the Ashram of Mandarom.

The holy city of Mandarom Shambhasalem was founded in 1969, about 50 kilometres northwest of Cannes. Bourdin progressively built a number of temples and statues between 1977 and 1990. Amongst these is a 22-metre statue of Buddha Maitreya, constructed in 1981, and a 21-metre statue of "Cosmic Christ" wielding a sword and shield, constructed in 1987. In 1990, a 33-meter statue of Bourdin was constructed at Mandarom. The legitimacy of the building permit was later challenged, and eventually, in June 2000, the statue was deemed illegal after a long legal dispute. As a result, it was demolished by the authorities on 6 September 2001. The sect denounced the demolition of Bourdin's statue, saying that it was comparable to the destruction of the Buddhas of Bamyan by the Taliban in Afghanistan earlier in the year.

At a ceremony on August 22, 1990, years after the foundation of the Aumist Movement, Bourdin was crowned "Cosmoplanetary Messiah". After his death in March of 1998, Bourdin was prohibited from being buried at Mandarom by the French government. His body was then to be buried in Grasse, but the Mayor, Jean-Pierre Leleux, vetoed that burial as well. Bourdin's body was ultimately buried on April 6, 1998, in a small cemetery near Castellane.

== Beliefs ==
Aumism is founded upon five "truths":

1. Death is nothing but a change of state
2. Suffering arises from the fear of moving forward
3. Pain makes one take "giant steps towards God"
4. Evolution is a law which dictates that every being must have the attainment of a higher level as its purpose
5. Final truth on "the ultimate goal to be reached".

The Aumists believe that the Earth is itself a living being, and that every animal is connected to a group soul. Aumists are told not to cause animals to suffer. They also believe in several "ages" of time, like the Golden Age, Silver Age, Bronze Age, Iron Age, and Copper age. Aumists also reject modern technologies.

== Controversies ==
In a 1996 report released by a commission of the French government, the Aumists at Mandarom were included on a list of 172 "dangerous" cults. The French government's anti-cultism was heightened after the suicide-homicides at the Order of the Solar Temple in 1994. In the 1990s, French television networks publicly attacked the Aumists and government-backed anti-cultists like Jean-Marie Abgrall carried out a campaign against the group, organized by the Association de Défense de la Famille et des Individus (ADFI). Between 1992 and 1995, Mandarom was raided by French police officers on several occasions where Bourdin and other members were repeatedly arrested.

In 1994, Florence Roncaglia, a former member of the Aumists accused Bourdin of molesting her in the 1980s when she was 15. On June 12, 1995, a raid on Mandarom took place and Bourdin was arrested. He was released on June 30, 1995. Bourdin remained awaiting trial until his death in 1998. Others came forward and in 2000 two people were paid a total of 250,000 French Francs by the Victim Compensation Commission. In the late 1990s, the government created a "Mission to Fight Cults", presided over by Alain Vivein. The Aumists also faced opposition from ecologist groups, who objected to the Aumists' construction of temples and in particular the 33-meter statue of Bourdin.
