= Jean Vernette =

- Born: 26 February 1929; Port-Vendres
- Died: 16 September 2002 (aged 73); Montauban
- Occupation: Catholic priest (1952–)
- Awards: prelate (1990)

Father Jean Vernette (26 February 1929, Port-Vendres, Pyrénées-Orientales - 16 September 2002) was a French priest of the diocese of Montauban. He was considered a specialist by the Roman Catholic Church.

In 1973, Vernette was appointed national secretary of the French episcopate for the study of cults and new religious movements. He published several books on cults, new therapies, and related topics. In his 1989 book, Le Nouvel Age, Vernette criticised the New Age movement, which he described as an "Anglo Saxon" movement which was beginning to invade France. He asked if it represented the coming of the Anti-Christ, a Jewish conspiracy, or a project for a global government. He also noted its parallels with Nazism and said that Christians should be discerning towards it.

Vernette spoke out against the 1996 report of the Parliamentary Commission on Cults in France and against the About-Picard law (in 2001), because of what he saw as a potential "anti-cult" attack on the Catholic Church itself. In 2000, he was auditioned by the French Senate about the opportuneness of a law strengthening the prevention and repression of cults.

== Main works ==
- Dictionnaire des groupes religieux aujourd'hui, with Claire Moncelon, Presses universitaires de France, 2001
- Les sectes, Paris, Presses universitaires de France, « Que sais-je ? », n° 2519, 1990
- Le New Age, Paris, Presses Universitaires de France, « Que sais-je ? », 1992
- L'athéisme, Paris, Presses universitaires de France, « Que sais-je ? », n° 1291, 1998 (ISBN 2-13-049301-7)
- L'Église catholique et les sectes, Cerf ed.
- Réincarnation résurrection. Communiquer avec l'au-delà, Les mystères de la vie après la vie, Mulhouse, Salvator ed., 1988, 188p
- Les Nouvelles Thérapies, mieux vivre et guérir autrement, with Clermons Lons, Presses de la Renaissance ed.
- Nouvelles Spiritualités, nouvelles sagesses, Bayard ed.
- Seront-ils chrétiens ? Perspectives catéchuménales, with H.Bourgeois, Chalet ed.
- Sectes et réveil religieux, quand l'Occident s'éveille
