= Scientology in France =

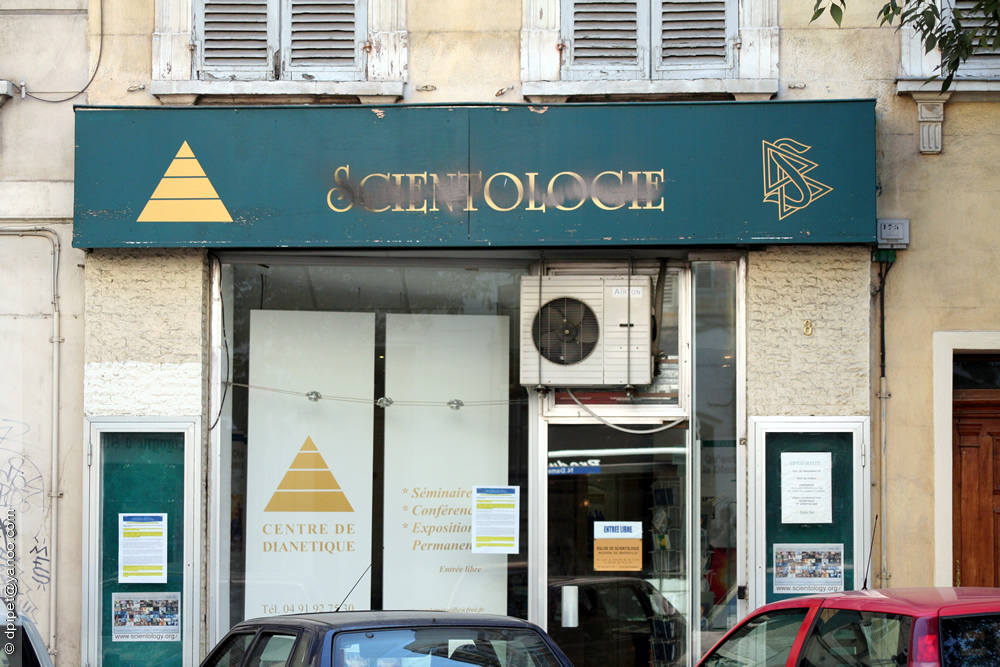
A Scientology building in Marseille, France

The Church of Scientology of France is organized as a group of secular nonprofit organizations. France is a secular state, which protects the rights of citizens to practice their religion. Although citizens can form religious associations based on the 1905 French law on the Separation of the Churches and the State, which grants certain benefits, the Church of Scientology of France is instead organized into secular associations based on a 1901 law regarding nonprofit groups.

A 1995 parliamentary report lists Scientology as a cult, and Scientology has since been under the watch of MIVILUDES and its predecessors (Observatoire interministériel sur les sectes and interministérielle de lutte contre les sectes). In its 2006 report MIVILUDES classified Scientology as a dangerous cult.

Seven officials from the Church of Scientology in France have been convicted of crimes such as embezzlement, and contribution to suicide.

== Background ==
Scientology was founded in 1952 by science fiction writer L. Ron Hubbard in the United States. It subsequently spread to other countries.

== Legal status ==
The French government does not keep statistics on religion but in 1999 the Church itself claimed that it had 40,000 adherents in France. The French newspaper Le Figaro reckons around 5000 adherents in France in 2008.

Since 1995, some French authorities have classified the Church of Scientology as a "secte" (cult) as seen in the report of the National Assembly of France. On this basis, a hostile stance is generally taken against the organization. A 1999 government inquiry committee reporting on the financial aspect of cults recommended dissolving the Church of Scientology because of swindling, complicity of swindling, abuse of trust, and other nefarious activities. A government report in 2000 categorized the church as an "absolute cult" and recommended that all its activities be prohibited. The keeping of files containing personal information on all its members (and other practices), are seen to qualify the Church as a totalitarian cult, moreover "extremely dangerous". The report rejected U.S. criticism of the French government's hostility towards Scientology, saying that Washington's protection of cults was "exorbitant".

In 2005 the municipal government of Paris passed an official resolution so that unlike in Marseille, celebrity Scientologist Tom Cruise would never be made an honorary citizen, specifically because of his affiliation with Scientology.

The 2006 riots in France came in the midst of a parliamentary commission in charge of examining the influence of cults, particularly on youth, which started its hearings on July 12, 2006, and was scheduled to be completed in December that year. The government "cultic watchdog" agency MIVILUDES subsequently warned that cults were infiltrating the suburbs, increasingly offering aid as a cover for their activities, notably so in a Church of Scientology's communique that "appeared to be taking the credit for calming the situation in one of the riot-hit suburbs."

While he was Finance Minister, Nicolas Sarkozy received Tom Cruise in Paris in 2004. The anti-cult Roger Ikor centre's website wrote that President Sarkozy was preparing to change the 1905 French law on the Separation of the Churches and State (that had been forbidding the state to finance any cult or religion), to allow cults to receive money from the state. That modification did not take place.

== Court cases against Scientology ==
The sect has had difficulties with the French judicial system for many years. No case has ever been straightforward. The Church of Scientology feels it has always managed to extricate itself nicely.

— Is Scientology Above the Law? (2000)

=== 1978 conviction ===
In 1978, L. Ron Hubbard was convicted in absentia by French authorities of engaging in fraud, fined 35,000 French Francs and sentenced to four years in prison. Georges Andreux, the head of the French Church of Scientology was convicted at the same trial and given a suspended one-year prison sentence.

=== 1996 conviction ===
Twenty-three Scientology officials were tried in Lyon for manslaughter, fraud, and the illegal practice of medicine. On November 22, 1996, the leader of the Lyon Church of Scientology, Jean-Jacques Mazier, was convicted of fraud and involuntary homicide, fined 500,000 francs and sentenced to eighteen months in prison for his role in the 1988 death of member Patrice Vic who committed suicide after going deeply into debt to pay for Scientology auditing sessions. Fourteen defendants were convicted of fraud and given suspended sentences, and the remaining eight were acquitted.

A 1997 Court of Appeals upheld Mazier's conviction, suspended the sentences of five of the convicted defendants, and acquitted the remainder. Related to this trial, two other scientologists were convicted in Toulon for threatening a psychiatrist and expert witness in the trial.

Scientology's Office of Special Affairs was found to have interfered with the case, including orchestrating an operative to approach François Mitterrand's staff and get the remanded defendants released prematurely, without notifying the judge. The case took three more years to come to trial, and only on order of the attorney general because of public pressure to do something about cults after the massacres of the Order of the Solar Temple.

=== 1999 conviction ===
In 1999, a Marseille court found five senior officials of the Church of Scientology guilty of fraud for "sham purification treatments" in Nice and Marseille. Xavier Delamare was sentenced to two years, partially deferred, and received a fine. Four others received suspended sentences of six months to two years, and two more were found not guilty.

=== 2009 conviction ===
==== Fraud case ====
On September 8, 2008, Judge Jean-Christophe Hullin ruled that the Celebrity Center, bookstore, and seven Scientology officials should be tried for fraud and "illegally practicing as pharmacists", over a 1998 complaint by a woman who said she was enrolled into the Church of Scientology by a group she met outside a metro station. The woman said she paid 140,000 francs for illegally prescribed drugs, an e-meter, and books.

The trial was due to begin on 25 May 2009, and prosecutors were calling for the French Scientology organization to be disbanded. However, a recent legislative change had forbid the dissolution of corporations even if convicted of fraud. Never thinking that change might be applied to rulings against sectes, "The news triggered a heated debate among French MPs. They demanded to know who was responsible for drafting the legislation with an amendment removing the legal power to dissolve an organisation, why the details were not scrutinised and how it came to be approved." In this court case, the legislative change removed any chance that prosecutors could get a judgment to dissolve the French organization. Even if the law was changed immediately, it wouldn't be effective retroactively, basically giving Scientology a reprieve over the threat of having their organization dissolved. The legislative loophole has since been corrected.

==== Conviction ====
On 27 October 2009, the Church of Scientology was convicted of defrauding recruits out of their savings. Judges ordered the Scientology Celebrity Center and bookstore to pay a €600,000 (US$888,000) fine. Earlier plans by the prosecution to force the Church to disband completely could not proceed due to changes in the penal code, and the judges stated they didn't order the church offices closed because it might push it underground where it could not be monitored. In his indictment, investigating judge Jean-Christophe Hullin criticized what he called the Scientologists' "obsession" with financial gain and practices he said were aimed at plunging members into a "state of subjection".

Six Scientology leaders were convicted of fraud. The head of Scientology in France, Alain Rosenberg received a two-year suspended jail sentence and a €30,000 fine. Four others received suspended sentences ranging from ten months to two years, while the other two were fined minor amounts. According to Catherine Picard, head of the French Association of Victims of Cults, the fining might encourage more "unhappy Scientologist recruits" to bring out their concerns. She also stated that, "Scientology can no longer hide behind freedom of conscience."

==== Response to conviction ====
Judges also said that they would ensure a paid posting would be placed in multiple publications outside France (including Time magazine and the International Herald Tribune) to ensure the news would spread beyond France. According to Olivier Morice, a lawyer for the civil plaintiffs, "The court told the Scientologists, in essence, to be very, very careful, because if you continue to use the same methods of harassment, you won't escape next time". Morice added that, "It’s the first time in France that the entity of the Church of Scientology is condemned for fraud as an organized gang".

Georges Fenech, the head of MIVILUDES, said that the court "condemned [the French branch of Scientology] as an entity ... due to its fraudulent way of operating ... [If] they begin swindling again, they can be subject to dissolution in the future". Fenech added that, "[this] is a historical turning point for the fight against cult abuses", and that, while members are "allowed to continue their activity ... a seed has been planted".

In an interview on the Canadian Broadcasting Corporation current affairs radio program The Current with Hana Gartner, former high-ranking Scientology official Mark Rathbun commented that the decision to convict the Church of Scientology of fraud in France would not have a significant impact on the organization. "On the France thing I don't think that's going to have any lasting impact, simply because they got a nine hundred thousand dollar fine I think - which is like chump change to them. They've got literally nearly a billion dollars set aside in a war chest," said Rathbun.

== Suicide of Kaja Ballo ==
Kaja Bordevich Ballo, a Norwegian student in Nice, committed suicide hours after hearing the results of a negative Scientology personality test. In April 2008, Aftenposten noted that the French police were investigating connections between Scientology and Ballo's death. The investigation was being headed by a judge in France. Prosecutors stated in December 2008 that they could not determine a direct link between the Scientology personality test and Ballo's death. The family decided not to file a civil lawsuit, but the case received attention both in France, and in Norway where several family members were politicians, and where suicides are generally not discussed in mass media.

== In popular culture ==
The relationship between the Church of Scientology and the law in France is the subject of Is Scientology Above the Law? The documentary investigates the suspicious circumstances surrounding a fraud probe into sixteen members of the church of Scientology. The role of the church is questioned in connection with the disappearance of files critical to the case; lawyers for the prosecution argue that the missing evidence was deliberately taken by members of Scientology working within and effectively undermining the legal system to protect the reputation of the church.

In April 2024, Scientology opened a new €33 million 'Ideal Org' in the Saint-Denis, Seine-Saint-Denis suburb of Paris after several years of legal battles with the municipality and a petition signed by 30,000 local residents who opposed the move. The opening event took place on April 6, 2024, but was overshadowed by peaceful protestors who had travelled from across Europe to demonstrate. French satirical newspaper Charlie Hebdo described the event as "the manufacturing of a propaganda film that will be distributed around the world" and Scientology's security response as "omnipresent" and "paranoid".

== See also ==
- About–Picard law
- Parliamentary Commission on Cults in France
- Scientology status by country § France
- Scientology and law § France
- Religion in France
