= Thierry Casasnovas =

French YouTuber and raw foodist

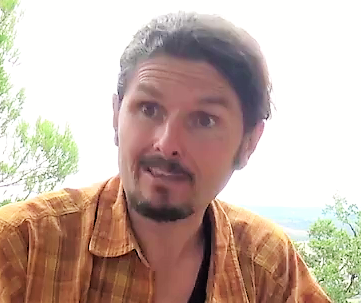
- Thierry Casasnovas in 2018
- Born: April 15, 1974 (age 52); Perpignan; Pyrénées-Orientales, France
- Occupations: Lifestyle coach, Naturopathic practitioner, Influencer
- Years active: 2011–present

Thierry Casasnovas is a French health influencer and alternative medicine advocate.

Without medical training, he gives advice on health and nutrition on the web, and he is a videographer, the creator of several hundred videos on YouTube. Some practices that he advises are considered pseudoscientific or even dangerous to one's health by dieticians and doctors.

== Biography ==
=== Childhood ===
Thierry Casasnovas was born in Perpignan.

He was trained as a baker and later became an itinerant baker moving between Morocco, the North Cape and Eastern European countries on bicycle trips.

=== Family ===
He had a son — Isaac — with a woman named Marina in March 2017 and a daughter — Stella — with another woman named Estelle in 2021.

=== Disease ===
Thierry Casasnovas states that he was seriously ill between 2001 and 2007, suffering from hepatitis C, advanced tuberculosis, acute pancreatitis, salmonella infection, depression, and several cardiac arrests. He saw raw food as "his last chance".

In 2006, he spent three weeks at the Hippocrates Health Institute in Florida, a center dedicated to “living food” and “regeneration”. For Pascale Duval, a spokesperson for UNADFI, this passage was decisive in the rest of Casasnovas’ career: “We often find the Hippocratic Institute in the career of New Age gurus. He did not become a guru for no reason, but because he associated with others”.

=== Crudivorism-related activities ===
On January 15, 2010, he founded his YouTube channel where he talks about his life and his views on raw food.

On 21 June 2012, he founded the Régénère association, a platform for organising internships and training. In July 2014, Thierry Casasnovas stated that the non-profit association Regénère only collects "a small commission" on the commercial activity of selling juice extractors, which allows the association to survive.

In 2019, the organization launched several training courses, including on hygiene and iridology, for a minimum cost of 200 euros each. The turnover that year was 1.8 million euros and he received a salary of 61,251 euros through his company Actinidia, with which he bought the name of the association Regènère. Actinidia was founded in 2015 and, according to a member of Régénère, Casasnovas started with a salary of €1,000 per month, with the aim of paying itself mainly on dividends. Casasnovas has refused to hand over his accounts to journalists, but according to him, his salary is around 2,500 euros per month for an annual turnover of 150,000 euros, except for the exceptional year of 2019.

A BFM TV article from 2020 indicates that Thierry Casasnovas offers thematic training at a cost of 300 euros per participant. In 2020, Le Journal du dimanche states that its turnover is mainly made up of training. The sessions "Cure de Jouvence" or "Healthy Ageing" are worth 300 euros and Thierry Casasnovas claims to sell several hundred per year. The cost of the internships can go up to 700 euros for six days, excluding accommodation. Thierry Casasnovas states that about 15 people make a living from this activity, i.e. four employees. In 2022, 20 Minutes, which commented on the 2021 Miviludes report, indicated that Casasnovas was suspected of demanding "exorbitant" financial retributions.

According to France bleu, Thierry Casasnovas derives "considerable advertising revenue" from his YouTube channel (over 100 million views). Nevertheless, YouTube demonetized his channel during the second quarter of 2022.

=== Popularity ===
In 2014, Rue89 described Thierry Casasnovas as a "'raw food' star on YouTube despite his dubious views," and 20 Minutes described him as within a few years having become "the leader of crudivorism, the tendency to eat only raw food to recover or stay healthy, according to him".

== Controversies and accusations ==
Scientists, the media, or organizations like the UNADFI tend, directly or indirectly, to link some of the controversial theories that he is spreading—without any officially recognized medical training—with a veiled form of charlatanism.

Nicknamed "the guru of raw food", the same authorities also mentioned possible prospects of sectarian drifts. They also pointed out the risks and dangers resulting from nutritional deficiencies relating to the strict and exclusive veganism which he advocates. In view of the above, the members of the MIVILUDES declared that they have received several hundred reports from the parents of followers worried about the fate and health of their relatives, many of whom claimed that they were deliberately giving up any conventional medical approach in favor of the teachings provided by Thierry Casasnovas. The aforesaid reports focused in particular on the fact that the allegedly curative treatments recommended by him are essentially limited to the absorption of freshly squeezed vegetable juices together with a raw food diet—strictly based on vegan nutrition—punctuated by interspersed extensive fasting periods.

In the summer of 2020, the Paris public prosecutor's office opened an investigation into his case on the grounds of potential endangerment and "suspected fraudulent abuse of vulnerable persons". Thierry Casasnovas has rejected all the accusations against him, citing freedom of speech.

He claims to have recovered from various pathological conditions such as tuberculosis or hepatitis C by adopting a raw and living diet.

During the COVID-19 pandemic, he spread conspiracy theories and misinformation about the disease.
