= Siderella =

French UFO religion

- Type: New religious movement
- Classification: UFO religion
- Founder: Jean-Paul Appel
- Origin: 1966; Paris, France
- Members: 50 to 500 (1995)
- Other names: Iso-Zen, Futura, Galacteus, Euro-Culture, Italia, Azur Mieux-Ëtre, Résonances nouvelles, les Voyageurs intemporels
- Official website: home.worldnet.fr/~gvero

Siderella, originally Iso-Zen, also known under many other names, was a French UFO religion. It was founded and led by Jean-Paul Appel, who founded the group in 1966 in Paris, France. The views of the group involved ufological and New Age themes, and took elements of Buddhism and Tantrism. They believed an apocalypse was imminent and that members of the group would be saved by aliens and taken to Alpha Centauri.

Members of Siderella lived communally, and preached consciousness expansion and preparing for contact with aliens, which involved group sex. They worshipped aliens. It counted two notable comic book artists among its membership, Jean Giraud and Sergio Macedo. Their advertisements involved science fiction, and in 1982 they published a comic book, Timeless Voyage, which was based on their beliefs. Guery claimed he had been conceived through alien intervention and that at the age of 12 he had been contacted by extraterrestrials.

Most active in France, though also present in other European countries, they moved to Tahiti in the 1980s. They eventually returned to Europe. The group went by several different names, often simultaneously or in combination and which changed several times. They received criticism from ex-members, other ufology groups, and journalists for their sexual practices, which were said to be abusive. It was often described as a cult by media outlets, and it was listed as a cult in the 1995 report of the Parliamentary Commission on Cults in France. It was one of the only groups ever officially classified as a "UFO cult" in France.

== Names and terminology ==
Siderella was known for its usage of multiple names, often simultaneously or in combination, which changed repeatedly. It was founded under the name Iso-Zen, standing for Intervalle Synthèse Opération Zététique, Energétique et Nucléonique (lit. 'Interval Synthesis Zététique, Energetic and Nucleonic').

Then the name was changed to, successively, Futura, Galacteus, Euro-Culture, Italia, Résonances nouvelles (lit. 'New Resonance'), Azur Mieux-Être (lit. 'Azur Better Being'), les Voyageurs intemporels (lit. 'The Timeless Voyagers'), and then Siderella. Additional names included Appel, Espace Futura, Groupe Énergie, Groupe Eva-Nouvelle Eve, Groupe Futura, Groupe Operal, and Interal. Siderella was the name it was listed as in the parliamentary cult report. The name Siderella is a neologism from Italian.

== Beliefs and practices ==
Siderella is a UFO religion, and also a contactee group. The French satirical newspaper Charlie Hebdo dubbed them a "psychopathosect". A "consciousness study group", it focused on practices aimed to expand human consciousness, and develop the "psycho-mental-spiritual evolution" of man. Their perspective was immaterial and heavily focused on extraterrestrial contact, worshiping UFOs. They believed in a "purified and unified devotion" towards aliens and "the Supreme Being". They drew elements from Buddhism and Tantrism. The group sought new members from university professors, using competitive tests, and advertised with flyers including science-fiction drawings. They advertised in the New Age scene, and presented themselves as merely UFO enthusiasts. Mostly active in France, they also had some members in Germany. As of 1995 they had an estimated 50 to 500 members.

Members lived communally; the group's activities centered around preparing for contact with aliens, and group sex, interpreted as "tantric transmutation". They also incorporated New Age beliefs and ones related to esoteric and initiatory societies, such as ones concerned with planetary degradation and "energy". They incorporated crystals into their practice, and wearing them was recommended. They also sold naturopathic medicine. They claimed to be able to telepathically communicate with beings from other dimensions, in an effort to achieve the "cosmic junction". They believed in an impending apocalypse where members would be saved by aliens in a UFO craft and taken to Alpha Centauri, though they presented themselves as more UFO-oriented than apocalyptic. They were noted to use esoteric language. They advocated initiating one's self into the "Unitary Science of the Intra-Universe". Appel would, in a trance, "channel" messages from these space beings. There were concerns over how they treated women. A related commercial organization was SARL Transtar-Interal, the group's commercial outlet, who sold the group's products, including CDs, cassettes, member Sergio Macedo's works, as well as an over 6000 page "bible" written by Appel. They also sold courses for a fee. This was how the group raised funds.

They were often described as a cult by media outlets, and other UFO organizations, including the organization SOS-OVNI which was critical of them. In 1995, the group was listed as a cult in the Cults and Money (French: Sectes et argent) report of the Parliamentary Commission on Cults in France. It was one of only 3 groups officially classified as "UFO cults" in France (listed as Siderella) by the report, being the only three exclusively ufological in nature. The other two were Raëlism and l'École de la préparation à l'évacuation extraterrestre.

== History ==
It was founded by Jean-Paul Appel-Guéry, known within the group as Appel Guery or Iso, Osi, or Io. His real name was Jean-Paul Appel. A contactee, he claimed to receive messages from aliens. Appel also claimed that he had been conceived by aliens, who had bestowed upon him "favorable chromosomal conjunctions", and that he had been "exceptionally gifted, programmed as he was by the cosmic powers". He claimed that he had first been contacted by extraterrestrial forces at age 12, when a beam of light passed through his brain, which, he said, only activated six years later while he was "initiated by a spiritual master". In 1966, the group was founded by Appel as Iso-Zen in Paris, France. They operated out of the Lowendal street in Paris for some time.

Appel declared it under the name Iso-Zen in 1970. It was part of the contactee movement in France, which was generally small. He dissolved it again in 1978 and reestablished it under several different names. They were popular during the hippie movement throughout the mid 1970s, and were sometimes viewed as more of an artist collective; the group had two notable comic book artists among its membership. Brazilian comic artist Sergio Macedo joined in 1980 while in France. Afterwards, he supposedly received visions of extraterrestrials, which would feature more prominently in his works from then on. The comic artist Jean Giraud, known as Mœbius, was also a member of the group. Appel was a great influence on his works, and in the 1990s described Appel as "a man of superior intelligence". In 2015, Macedo expressed no regrets and praised Appel as "an extraordinary guide". Other members included the relatives of politicians and well-known fashion designers. Singer Michel Jonasz briefly expressed interest before believing Appel was unwilling to "share the spotlight".

In 1980, they announced an impending apocalypse. In 1982, the group moved out of France and to Tahiti in French Polynesia, where they established a "study center". Both Girard and Macedo moved with them to Tahiti. Based on increasing visionary elements, that year Appel wrote Timeless Voyage, a comic book, with illustrations from Macedo. This comic depicts the beliefs of the group, and was claimed to be based on a real story experienced by members of the group. They received some attention for this when another UFO religion, the Order of the Solar Temple, sold the comic; the Solar Temple committed mass suicide in 1994, which some commentators connected to the comic strip. Appel denied any connection and called what happened tragic. They later moved back to Europe, though they still regularly visited Tahiti.

Beginning in 1981 in a parliamentary cult report by Alain Vivien, they were denounced as dangerous or as a cult by several sources. The French anti-cult group ADFI received several family complaints against them. In 1992, the Envoyé spécial program criticized them for allegedly abusive sexual practices. 1996, former member of the group, Isabelle Sebagh, denounced them for their behaviors and declared them a cult, calling Appel abusive, antisemitic, and saying their behavior was sexually disturbed. She had joined the group at age 17. In 1996, she wrote the book L'adepte, 7 ans dans l'enfer d'une secte, published by Le Comptoir, containing these allegations. They were also denounced as a cult in the 1993 book Le grand décervelage: Enquête pour combattre les sectes by Bernard Fillaire.

In the 1990s, they bought the Château de Jaugy in Gièvres, at 18 hectares, for 1.89 million francs. It was made into their headquarters and was converted into a restaurant and hotel. By 2002, Appel had acquired a small fleet of boats based on his funds from the group.
