= Glorious Cross of Dozulé =

Illuminated cross in Normandy, France

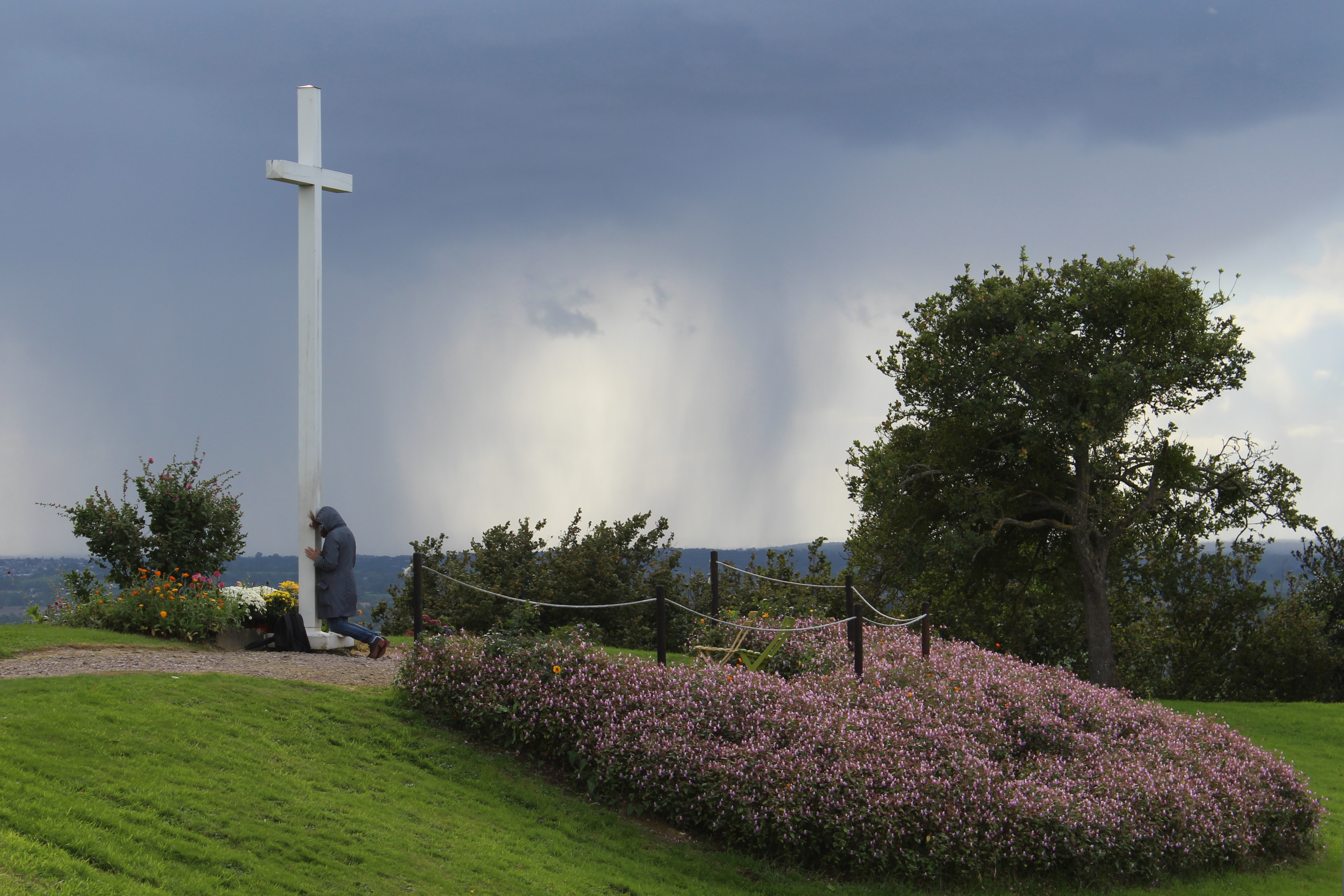
The current Cross of Dozulé, in the place of its famous first apparition to Madeleine Aumount in 1972

The Glorious Cross of Dozulé, also known as Croix d'amour in France and as Cruz de Amor in Portugal, is a project of an illuminated cross, not entirely recognized by the hierarchy of the Catholic Church, coloured white and blue 7.38 m (24.2 ft) tall with arms 1.23 m (4 ft 0 in) long, which means with an exact proportion of a ratio of three between the vertical and horizontal length, based on the reported apparitions of Jesus Christ to Madeleine Aumont and should to be erected in Dozulé, a small town in Normandy, located about 25 km (16 mi) from Lisieux in France. The Vatican ruled in 2025 that the phenomenon of these apparitions was not supernatural.

== Origins of the Cross ==
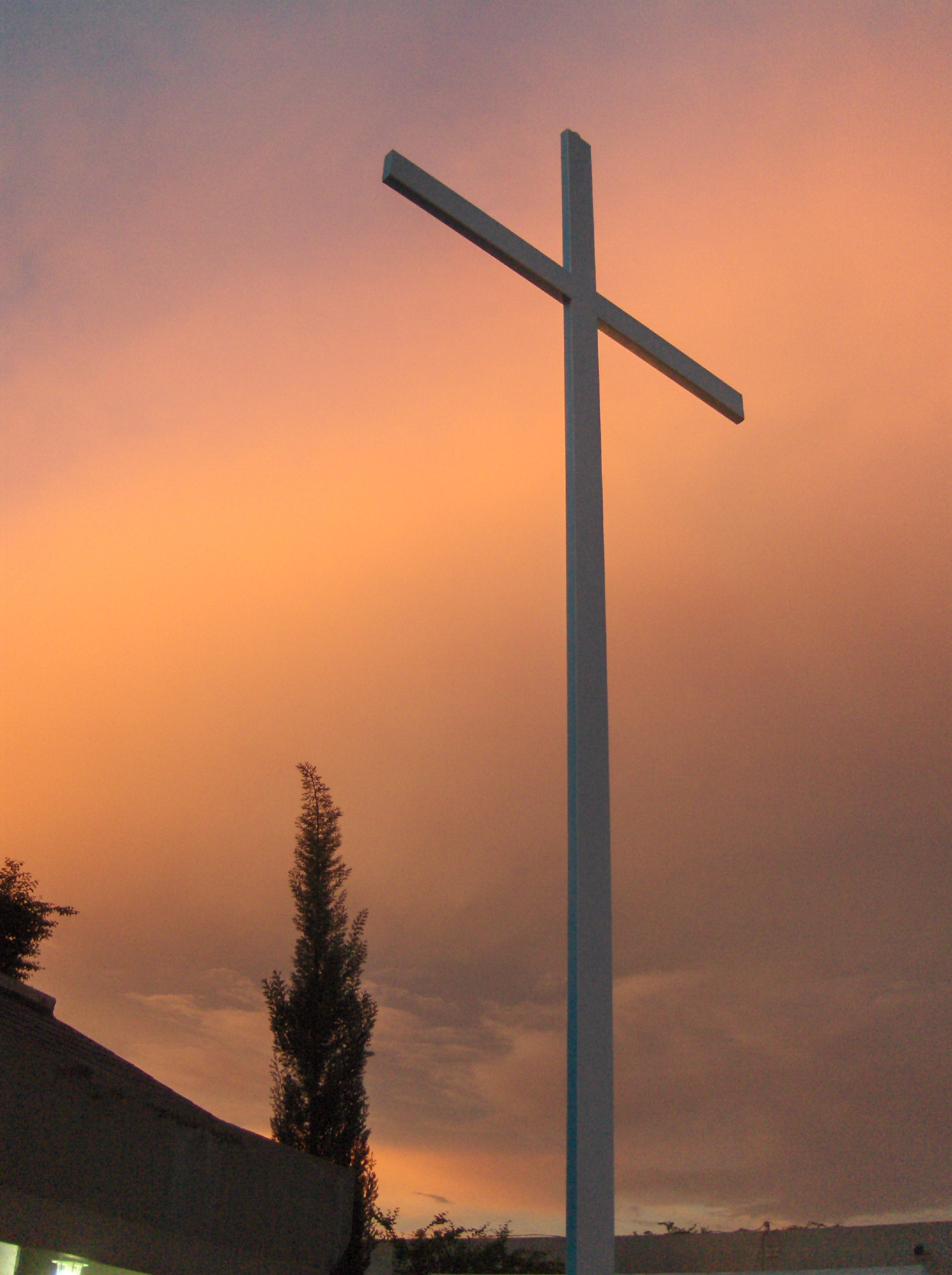
Cross of Dozulé replica

Between 1972 and 1978, Jesus Christ is said to have appeared 49 times in Dozulé to Madeleine Aumont, a mother of five children, in the presence of her parish priest Victor L'Horset and other faithful people, and is believed to have dictated a series of messages, containing teachings and of warnings for all people, according to those who believe in them. Among them is the daily «Prayer of Dozulé». The messages are seen as an annunciation of the return of Christ. The construction of the Glorious Cross is seen as a sign of it.

The followers of the messages of Dozulé believe also that they are the continuation of the Three Secrets of Fátima and that they ask, for the conversion of humanity to avoid a material and spiritual catastrophe.

== Connections to cults and anti-communism ==
The cross is an apocalyptic symbol, not fully recognized by the hierarchy of the Catholic Church, connected to anti-communist rhetoric. It is seen as a means of salvation: those who do not possess the cross shall be damned. It was popularized in Portugal by the Fraternidade Missionária de Cristo-Jovem (Missionary Fraternity of Young Christ), a religious community made by a Catholic priest and several nuns.

== The daily prayer of Dozulé ==
The followers of Dozulé apparitions believe that Jesus revealed to Madeleine Aumont that the faithful are to recite this prayer every day, beginning with the sign of the Cross:

"Jesus of Nazareth has triumphed over death-His reign is eternal. He comes to triumph over the world and time.
Mercy my God, on those who blaspheme You; forgive them for they know not what they do.
Mercy my God, for the scandal in the world; deliver them from the spirit of satan.
Mercy my God, on those who run away from You; give them a taste for the Holy Eucharist.
Mercy my God, on those who shall come to repent at the foot of the Glorious Cross. May they find there, Peace and Joy in God our Savior.
Mercy my God, so that Your Kingdom come, but save us... as there is still time... for the time is near and I AM coming. Amen.
Come Lord Jesus, we attend You. Amen."

== Friends of the Glorious Cross of Dozulé ==
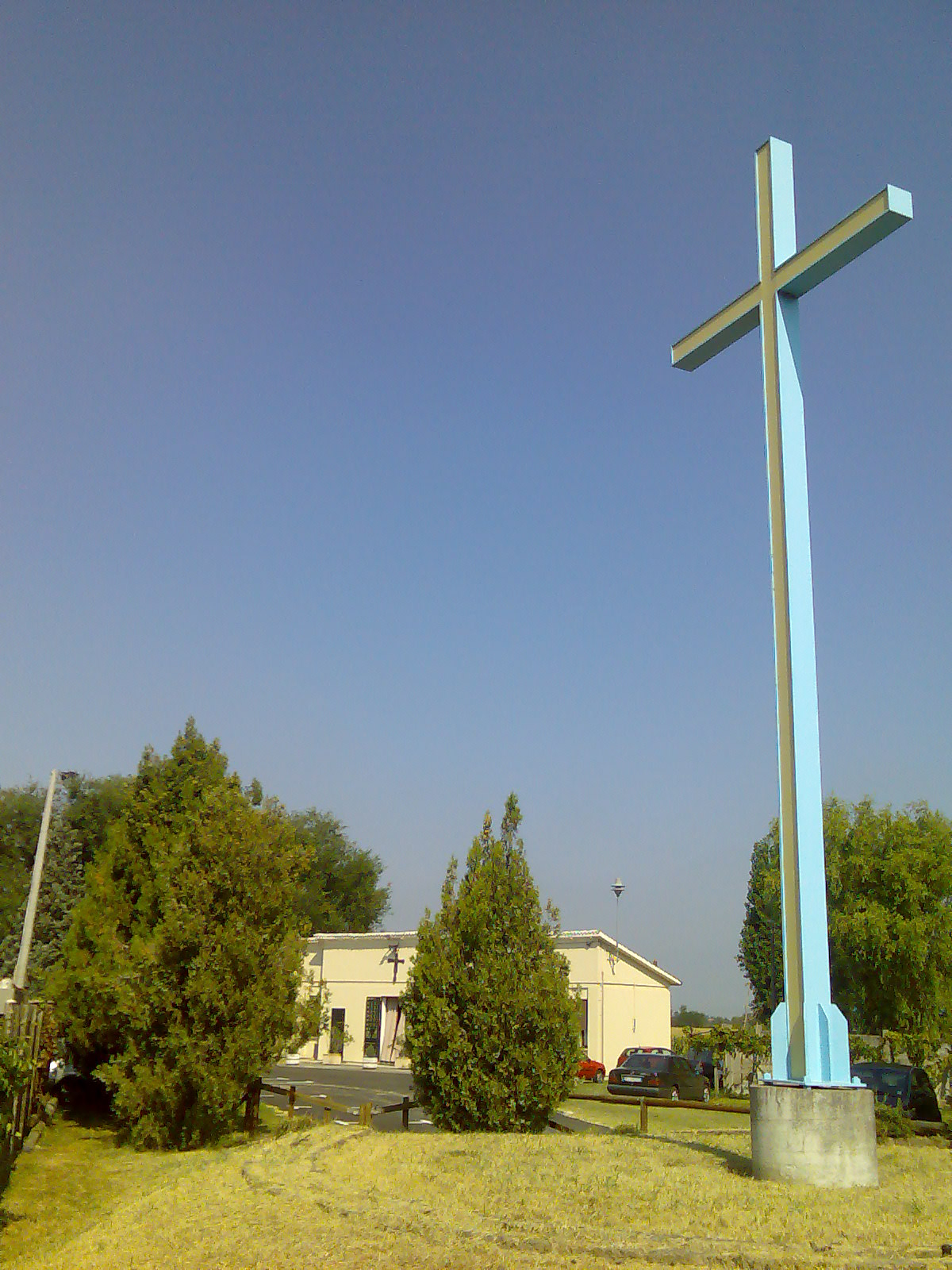
Cross of Dozulé replica

The Friends of the Glorious Cross of Dozulé (in French: Amis de la Croix Glorieuse de Dozulé) is a Christian movement founded in the 1980s in the Calvados département, France. It is based on the reported private revelations received by Madeleine Aumount in Dozulé in the 1970s, but sustained on several "new messages" received by an alleged mystic, self-styled JNSR, that confirmed as true the Madeleine's messages. However, JNSR predicted the end of the world, preceding by many catastrophes, and published a new «Message of Dozulé» which contains the doctrine of this group. In 1995, this group (totally separated from the original Dozulé apparitions) was considered as a cult in the 1995 parliamentary report on cults, and by anti-cult associations (ADFI, CCMM), notably because of its apocalypticism.

== Vatican Ruling ==
On November 12, 2025,

The Dicastery of the Doctrine of the Faith has determined that “the phenomenon of the alleged apparitions said to take place in Dozulé” linked to the creation of an enormous cross that would guarantee remission of sins and salvation to those who approached it, “is to be considered, definitively, as not supernatural in origin.”

This concurs with previous judgments, such as in 1983, when Jean-Marie-Clément Badré, who was then the local bishop, said, “in no case can the construction of a monumental cross undertaken in Dozulé (...) be an authentic sign of the manifestation of the Spirit of God.”

== See also ==
- Dozulé
- Visions of Jesus and Mary
- Marian apparition
