= Freedom of religion in France =

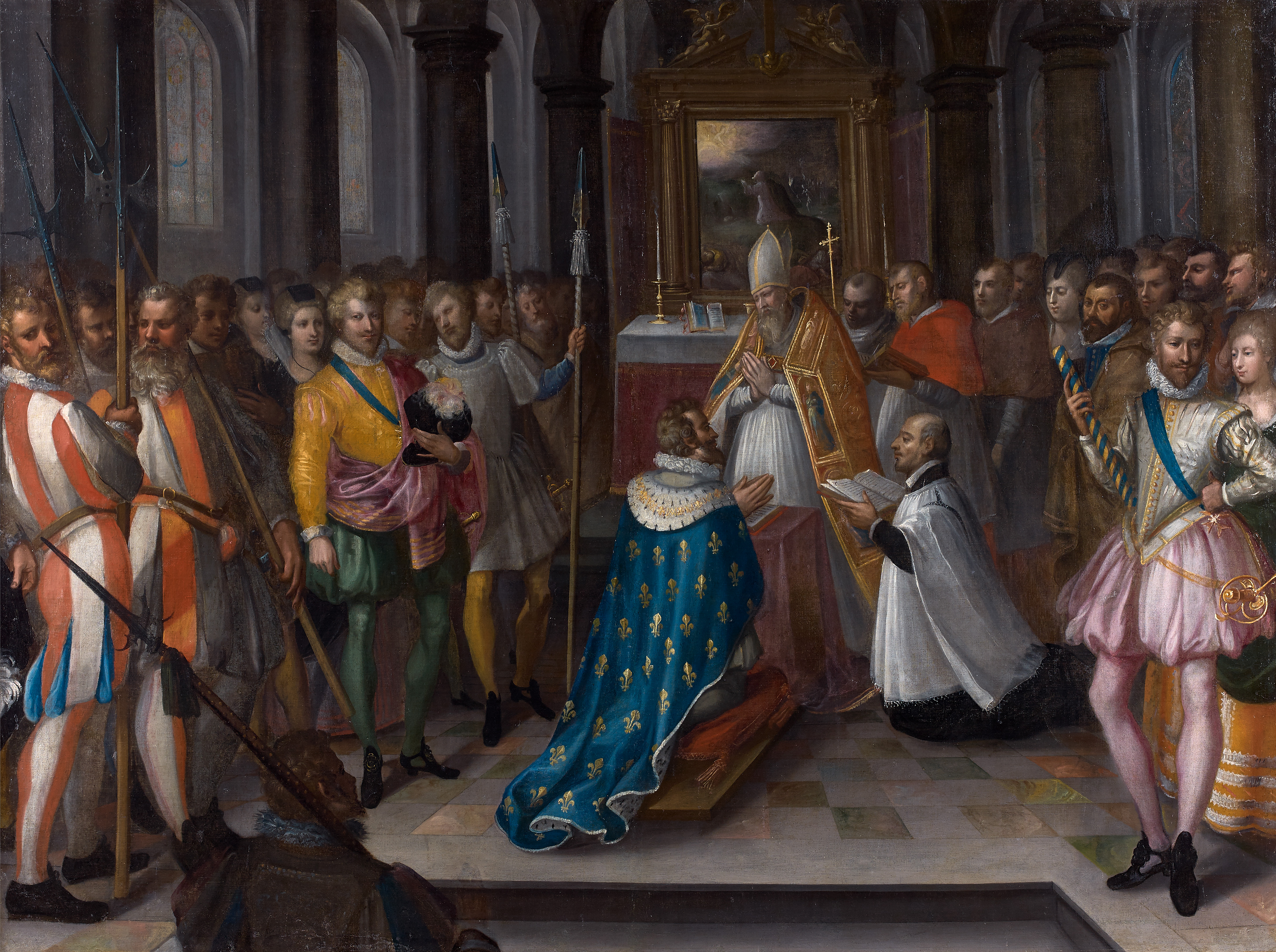

Freedom of religion in France is guaranteed by the constitutional rights set forth in the 1789 Declaration of the Rights of Man and of the Citizen.

From the conversion of King Clovis I in 508, the Roman Catholic faith was the state religion for a thousand years, as was the case across Western Europe. In the 1500s, the Protestant faith gained numerous converts in France. A series of bloody persecutions and religious civil wars were ended by the Edict of Nantes issued by King Henry IV, granting official tolerance and protection to the Protestant minority. However, the Revocation of the Edict of Nantes by Henry's grandson, Louis XIV in 1685, forced many Protestants to convert to Catholicism or flee the country as Huguenot refugees.

Catholicism remained the state religion of France until the 1790s, when it was heavily persecuted during the French Revolution. After Napoleon Bonaparte became head of state, he brought an end to the religious turmoil by negotiating the Concordat of 1801 with the Pope, allowing Catholic worship, education, and charitable activities to resume with financial support from the state. This agreement continued in force throughout the 19th century, despite rising anti-clericalism. Toleration was also extended to Lutherans, Calvinists, and Jews.

Since the enactment of the 1905 French law on the Separation of the Churches and the State, the French government has followed the principle of laïcité (secularism), in which the State does not recognize or support any religion as official (except for the local law in Alsace-Moselle). Instead, it merely recognizes certain religious organizations, according to formal legal criteria that do not address religious doctrine. In return, religious organizations are to refrain from involvement in the State's policy-making.

Alsace came back to France only in November 1918. Contrary to other French regions, Alsace was under French Concordat of 1802. The territory was under German dominion from 1871 to 1918. When it came back to France, they kept the Concordat rule and did not come under Loi 1905.

In 2023, Freedom House scored the country 3 out of 4 for religious freedom; this was mainly due to the Reinforcing Republican Principles Bill (the Anti-Separatism Law), as well as high-profile antisemitic speech in the public media.

== Background ==
=== Terminology ===
French language terminology related to religion and freedom of religion differs somewhat from English. In particular, there are several misleading faux amis between French and English regarding religion:

- The French culte means "(religious) worship", or, in a legal context, an organized "religion", taken in a broad sense. An organisation cultuelle is thus an organization that supports religious worship, not a "cult". As explained below, there are financial and other operational constraints for being recognized as an association cultuelle for tax purposes.
- The French secte can have the meaning of the English sect, especially when applied to Buddhism. However, in general parlance, it has the derogatory meaning of the English "cult".

=== Government and religious organizations ===
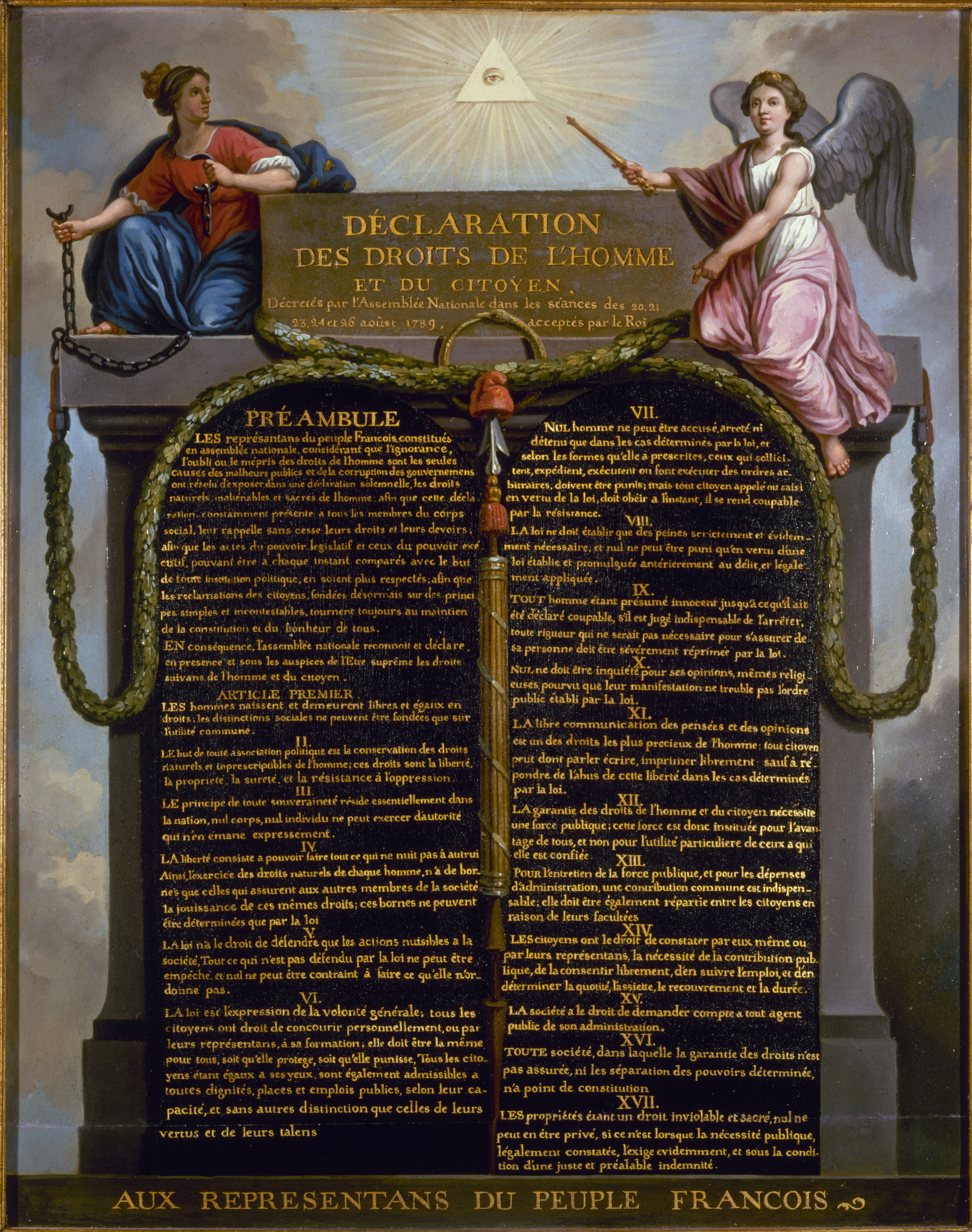
The Declaration of the Rights of Man and of the Citizen guarantees freedom of religion, as long as religious activities do not infringe on public order in ways detrimental to society.

The relationship between government and religious organizations in France is defined by the 1905 "Law concerning the separation of the churches and the state" ("Loi concernant la séparation des Églises et de l'Etat"). Its first sentence is, though:

The Republic assures freedom of conscience. It guarantees the free exercise of religious worship under the sole restrictions hereafter in the interest of public order. The Republic does not grant recognition nor pay nor subsidises any church. (La République assure la liberté de conscience. Elle garantit le libre exercice des cultes sous les seules restrictions édictées ci-après dans l'intérêt de l'ordre public. La République ne reconnaît, ne salarie ni ne subventionne aucun culte.)

The 1789 Declaration of the Rights of Man and of the Citizen, which is considered by legal authorities to have equal legal standing with the Constitution of France, states:

No one may be questioned about his opinions, [and the] same [for] religious [opinions], provided that their manifestation does not trouble the public order established by the law.

and:

The law has the right to ward [i.e., forbid] only actions [which are] harmful to the society. Any thing which is not warded [i.e., forbidden] by the law cannot be impeded, and no one can be constrained to do what it [i.e., the law] does not order.

Thus follows that the French government cannot arbitrarily regulate and prohibit religious activity; it is strictly constrained to regulate it only to the extent that there is a need to safeguard public order and prohibit actions harmful to society (such as, for instance, human sacrifices).

The French concept of religious freedom did not grow out of an existing pluralism of religions but has its roots in a history with Roman Catholicism as the single official religion and including centuries of persecution of people not endorsing it, or straying from the most official line, from the Cathars to the Huguenots and the Jansenists – this lasted until the French Revolution.

French insistence on the lack of religion in all things public (laïcité or secularism) is a notable feature in the French ideal of citizenship. This concept of secularism, also plays a role in ongoing discussions about the wearing of scarves by Muslim women in public schools. In 2004, the French Parliament passed a law prohibiting the wearing of ostentatious religious garb in public primary and secondary schools; motivations included the tradition of keeping religious and political debates and proselytism out of such schools, as well as the preservation of the freedom of Muslim female students forced to wear certain costumes out of peer pressure. See French law on secularity and conspicuous religious symbols in schools.

The French Republic has always recognised individuals rather than groups and holds that its citizens' first allegiance is to society in general and not to a particular group, religious or otherwise; the opposing attitude, known as communautarisme, is generally considered undesirable in political discourse in France. On the other hand, the state sees that it is also responsible to protect individuals from groups rather than to protect groups, religious or others.

Apart from special cases due to historical circumstances (the local law in Alsace-Moselle and the military chaplaincy regimes), the French government is prohibited by law from granting official recognition to religion, and is also prohibited from subsidizing them or paying their personnel. However the government grants recognition to legal entities (associations) supporting religious activities. The difference is important, since the French government refuses to legally define what is a religion and what is not, and refuses to legally delimit the boundaries of religions. The state has a role in the appointment of bishops, directly in the case of Strasbourg and Metz, and indirectly (but with a rarely used power of veto) in that of other diocesan bishops. In consequence only suitable nationals are appointed and the episcopate does not reflect the ethnic diversity of practising Catholics in France.

Religion in France
Religion	percent
Christianity	54%
None	40%
Islam	4%
Judaism	1%
Buddhism	1%

Individuals organizing as groups with the exclusive purpose of worship (associations cultuelles) may register as such and get significant tax exemptions set by law. Religious groups with non-worship (e.g. humanitarian) activities are free to get organized as associations with the usual tax exemptions granted to secular associations. These definitions are covered by an extensive body of jurisprudence (roughly, case law) which focuses on the activities of the groups from a financial point of view, and does, according to law, not take religious doctrine into account.

The population of France is roughly 50% Roman Catholic, 4–5% Muslim, around 3% Protestant, 1% Jewish, 1% Buddhist, 1% other denominations, and 40% not religious (with 30% of atheists). Church attendance is low among Catholics, and polls indicate that a significant proportion of the population is atheist or agnostic. Since the French government does not collect data on religious preferences, all quoted numbers are from polls rather than from a census and should be considered with the corresponding caution.

== Attitudes with respect to minority religions and cults in France ==
Since the 1970s and 1980s, an increasing number of new religious movements have become active in France. Certain religious bodies such as the Church of Scientology, the Children of God, the Unification Church, the Raëlian movement or the Order of the Solar Temple were listed by parliamentary reports as dangerous or criminal cults.

Officials and associations fighting excesses of such groups, justified these measures by the need to have appropriate legal tools and the need to fight criminal organizations masquerading as legitimate religious groups. Critics contended that those actions unfairly targeted minority religions, jeopardized freedom of religion, and were motivated by prejudice. The matters were made even more complex by the fact that some of the groups involved are based in the United States, where they actively lobbied the intervention of the government of that country.

=== Difficulties ===
France, as well as other countries, was aware of various tragedies caused by groups labeled as "destructive cults" such as the People's Temple, the Branch Davidians and Aum Shinrikyo and the suicide murders of the Order of the Solar Temple which occurred in Quebec, Switzerland and France. Furthermore, some groups such as the Church of Scientology were accused of defrauding their members.

The population in general is not in favor of groups described as cults. In 2000, a representative 1000 person poll indicated that the majority of the polled people considered cults a significant threat to democracy (73%), their family and friends (66%), and themselves (64%) and 86% (76% of adherents of other religions than Catholicism) favored legislation restricting cults.

Leaders of the French Protestant minority claim that freedom of religion was actually well protected in France and that cultural sensitivity and careful relationships with local authorities and other Christians could prevent most difficulties.

- Jean-Arnold de Clermont, president of the French Association of Protestants:

"I have no time for the idea that we live in a country that represses religious liberties. We continue to enjoy total freedom in setting up religious organizations as long as the existing legislation is known and applied."

- Stéphane Lauzet, the Nîmes-based general secretary of the French Evangelical Alliance (part of the World Evangelical Fellowship):

"Christian groups encounter problems mostly when they misunderstand or ignore the complex technicalities of French law. Even aggressive evangelists can work without any real problems as long as they stick to the law."

=== Complaints by minority religions and groups ===
Some groups have complained that, following from the publications of those reports and the enactment of the About-Picard law, they have suffered from discrimination by public authorities, private corporations and individuals.

The group Coordination des Associations et Particuliers pour la Liberté de Conscience, founded in January 2002, requested:

the dissolution of the MILS as its very purpose, "to fight against sects," is an affront to the French Constitution which guarantees the religious neutrality of the State and the principle of separation of Church and State
the repeal of any discriminatory law containing the word "cult," "sect," "cultic," or "sectarian" as laws should not specify groups as "sectarian" or "cultic" as, in a democracy, all individuals and groups should be treated equally and in the same manner.

This group, however, has been qualified by a 2005 OSCE report as a partisan organization whose "allegations are essentially anonymous and thus of uncertain provenance and reliability."

Some limited controversy occurred in France concerning alleged religious discrimination regarding the security measures that the French government has deployed for official visits of Chinese officials and for festivities organised in collaboration with China, including the exclusion of pro-Tibet and pro-Falun Gong protesters from the path of the Chinese officials. The International Helsinki Federation for Human Rights denounced the warm welcome of president Jiang Zemin in France, which it denounced as being motivated by economic prospects of trade with China. Many French politicians have denounced what they considered to be an over-zealous security apparatus in those visits. Similar controversial security measures have been implemented for the visit of former US president George W. Bush, another foreign head of state controversial in France.

=== Reports by the United States Commission on International Religious Freedom ===
In its 2000 annual report by the United States Commission on International Religious Freedom, released by the Bureau of Democracy, Human Rights, and Labor of the U.S. Department of State, it was reported that "The ensuing publicity [by the release of a parliamentary report against "sectes"] contributed to an atmosphere of intolerance and bias against minority religions. Some religious groups reported that their members suffered increased intolerance after having been identified on the list."

In its 2004 annual report by the same commission it reports that "[...] official government initiatives and activities that targets "sects" or "cults" have fueled an atmosphere of intolerance toward members of minority religions in France. [...] These initiatives [the publication of reports characterizing specific groups as dangerous and the creating of agencies to monitor and fight these groups] and are particularly troubling because they are serving as models for countries in Eastern Europe where the rule of law and other human rights are much weaker than in France".

They conclude with an assessment that since the restructuring of the main agency concerned with this issue (referring to the new MIVILUDES replacing its predecessor, MILS), have reportedly improved religious freedoms in France.

In its February 2004 statement, the commission recommended that the U.S. government urge the government of France to ensure that any state regulations on public expression of religious belief or affiliation adhere strictly to international human rights norms and that the French government and legislature should be urged to reassess their initiatives in light of its international obligations to ensure that every person in France is guaranteed the freedom to manifest his or her religion or belief in public, or not to do so.

The Commission went on by giving advice to the French government that it should start to tackle immigration issues, which have been a topic of hot political debate for the past 25 years:

The Commission also stated that though increased immigration in France in recent years has created new challenges for the French government, including integration of these immigrants into French society as well as problems of public order, these challenges should be addressed directly ...

The commission did not include France in their 2005 report.

=== Pew Research Center ===
According to Pew Research Center in 2017, France has a high level of government restrictions on religion. Among the world's 25 most populous nations, France is among the 12 countries with a high level of religious restrictions, according to 2015 data. In Europe, France has the second highest level of religious restrictions, behind only Russia.

== Official position about religious signs and symbols ==
In 2004, France passed a law banning the use of "conspicuous" religious symbols in public schools, including the hijab.

Many Muslims complained that the law infringed on their freedom of religion. Similarly the Muslim Public Affairs Council called the ban "a major affront to freedom of religion", noting that many Muslims believe it is mandated by religious texts.

Human Rights Watch stated that the law is "an unwarranted infringement on the right to religious practice".

The United States Commission on International Religious Freedom, appointed by the US government, expressed concern for the law in its 2004 report. It stated that "The French government's promotion of its understanding of the principle of secularism should not result in violations of the internationally recognized individual right to freedom of religion or belief."

On 14 September 2010, an act of parliament was passed resulting in the ban on the wearing of face-covering headgear, including masks, helmets, balaclava, niqābs and other veils covering the face in public places, except under specified circumstances. The ban also applies to the burqa, a full-body covering, if it covers the face.

It was reported that a set of rules including a ban on religious signs or symbols at civil marriages was introduced in the 9th and 10th arrondissements of Marseille. The mayor-council of Marseille did not support the ban.

== Government activities against cults ==
=== Actions of the national government ===
In 1982 premier minister Pierre Mauroy requested a report on sectes which was delivered by Alain Vivien in 1983. The "Rapport Vivien" outlines problems of families, possible reasons for this sudden increase in such groups, sects as described by themselves and by others, the legal situation in France and abroad, and recommends some actions like education of children in the sense of laïcité, better information of the general public, mediation between families and adherents by a family court, help to French adherents abroad, attention on the rights of children. It concludes with the Voltaire quotation: "Que chacun dans sa loi cherche en paix la lumière." ("So that everyone within its law can search in peace for the light")

The National Assembly instituted the first Parliamentary Commission on Cults in France in 1995, headed by parliament members Alain Gest and Jacques Guyard, following the mass suicide of adepts of the Order of the Solar Temple.

On March 21, 2000, the Justice Court of Paris found Jacques Guyard guilty of defamation for having called Anthroposophy a secte ("cult") practicing "mental manipulation". He was fined FF 20,000 and ordered to pay FF 90,000 to the anthroposophical Federation of Steiner schools. The Court stated that "the investigation [of that parliamentary report] was not serious. It is proved that it only considered affidavits by alleged 'victims' of Anthroposophy but that neither the authors of these affidavits nor the alleged perpetrators were heard by the [parliamentary] commission". The Paris judges also decided to strip Guyard of his parliamentary immunity in connection with this case. (Le Monde March 23, 2000)

The most controversial part of the report was the appendix, where a list of purported cults compiled by the general information division of the French National Police (Renseignements généraux) was reprinted. It contained 173 groups, including Jehovah's Witnesses, the Theological Institute of Nîmes (a fundamentalist Christian Bible college), and the Church of Scientology. Although this list has no statutory or regulatory importance, it is at the background of the criticism directed at France with respect to freedom of religion.

Major concerns listed in these official reports and other discussions include:

- the well-being of children raised in religious communities that isolate themselves from the rest of society, or, at least, ask their members to avoid social interaction with the rest of society;
- child abuse, especially abusive corporal punishment or sexual abuse;
- the defrauding of vulnerable members by the religious management;
- suicides and killings in destructive cults;
- the advocacy of medical practices that are generally considered unsafe, and the prohibition of some "mainstream" medical practices;
- the aggressive proselytizing of minors and vulnerable persons;
- the hidden influence peddling of certain groups in the administration and political circles.

The government of Alain Juppé created in 1996 the "Observatoire interministériel des sectes" ("interministerial board of observation of cults") which delivered yearly reports and out of which grew in 1998 the "Interministerial Mission in the Fight Against Sects/Cults" (MILS) headed by Alain Vivien. MILS was formed to coordinate government monitoring of sectes (name given to cults in France). In February 1998 MILS released its annual report. The activities of the MILS and Alain Vivien's background as the head of an anti-cult organization raised serious concerns and critiques from several human rights organizations and government bodies (See also About-Picard law#Reactions). In 1999, Vivien was put under police protection following threats and the burglary of his home (L'Humanité, January 14, 1999; ).

Vivien resigned in June 2002 under criticism from groups targeted by the Report on Cult activities. An interministerial working group was formed to determine the future parameters of the Government's monitoring of sects, called the "Interministerial Mission for Monitoring and Combatting Cultic Deviances" (MIVILUDES; official site).

Headed by Jean-Louis Langlais, senior civil servant at the Ministry of the Interior, MIVILUDES was charged with observing and analyzing movements that constitute a threat to public order or that violate French law, coordinating the appropriate response, informing the public about potential risks, and helping victims to receive aid. In its announcement of the formation of MIVILUDES, the Government acknowledged that its predecessor, MILS, had been criticized for certain actions abroad that could have been perceived as contrary to religious freedom. In an interview given in March 2003, Langlais emphasized that the issue at stake is not to fight "sects" as such but merely "deviances" these might have. However, he also admitted that it is difficult to define the concept of "deviances".

In May 2005 the former prime minister Jean-Pierre Raffarin issued a circular indicating that the list of cults published on the parliamentary report should no longer be used to identify cults.

=== Litigation ===
In a number of cases, minority religious groups have litigated against the national or local governments, or against private organizations, which they deemed to have infringed on their rights because of religious prejudice.

- The association of Jehovah's Witnesses have lost and won court cases regarding their tax-exempt status, specifically concerning action on the part of the government of France to imposed a retroactive 108% tax on all donations received to the organizational body of Jehovah's Witnesses in France, and/or a 60% tax on incoming donations. On June 30, 2011, the European Court of Human Rights found the French government in violation of article 9 of the European Convention on Human Rights. The ruling marked the first time France was found in violation of article 9.
- In 2001 the psychiatrist Jean-Marie Abgrall and called for by French justice as an expert concerning cult affairs won a court suit deposed against him by the Rael Movement (Belgian branch). The latter movement had seen two of its members convicted for child abuse
- On December 18, 2002, the Court of Appeal of Versailles reversed a decision by a lower court and convicted Jean-Pierre Brard – a French deputy, Journal 15-25 ans, and the director of publication of this magazine, of libeling the Jehovah's Witnesses. The court ordered that a communiqué drafted by it be published in Journal 15-25 ans as well as in a national daily paper and that the defendants pay €4,000 to the Christian Federation of Jehovah's Witnesses. The verdict related to a September 2001 report on sects published by Journal 15-25 ans, where Brard accused the Jehovah's Witnesses of employing the same methods as international criminal organizations. The deputy appealed the verdict to the Court of Cassation, which confirmed the conviction of Jean-Pierre Brard but canceled that of the director of publication.
- On November 6, 2002, the Auch court of large claims ordered the dissolution of an organization that had been explicitly created to prevent Jehovah's Witnesses from constructing a place of worship in Berdues. The court found that the organization's goal was to "hinder the free exercise of religion".
- On October 17, 2002, the administrative court of Orléans annulled a municipal decision issued by the mayor of Sorel-Moussel, which granted him the preemptive right to purchase a plot of land that the local Jehovah's Witness community had intended to buy and use for the construction of a house of worship. The court considered that the mayor had abused his right of preemption, since he exerted it without having an urbanization project prior to preemption.
- On June 13, 2002, the administrative court of Poitiers annulled a municipal decision issued by the mayor of La Rochelle, which refused the use of a municipal room to the Jehovah's Witnesses on grounds that the Witnesses were listed in the 1995 parliamentary report; the court ruled that, while a mayor may refuse the use of a room for a motive of public order, the motive that he used in this case was not a motive of public order.
- On March 21, 2000, the Justice Court of Paris found Jacques Guyard, one of the main author of the controversial parliamentary report against sects guilty of defamation for having called Anthroposophy a cult practicing "mental manipulation". He was fined, and his parliamentary immunity removed in connection with this case. (Le Monde March 23, 2000)
- On October 16, 2013, the Council of State condemned the refusals of the French administration to accept the religious ministers of Jehovah's Witnesses as prison chaplains, explaining that the detainees "may exercise the religion of their choice, in accordance with the suitable conditions for organising the premises, within solely the limits imposed by security and good order in the institution".
- On July 6, 1994, the European Commission of Human Rights ruled that France was required to formally recognize an atheist organization in the same way as religious faith communities.

== See also ==
- 1905 French law on the separation of Church and State
- Dechristianization of France during the French Revolution
- Declaration of the Rights of Man and of the Citizen
- European Convention on Human Rights
- Irreligion in France
- Religion in France
- Religious freedom
- Religious intolerance
- Parliamentary Commission on Cults in France
