= Theological and Missionary Institute =

- Type: Private
- Established: 1989
- Affiliations: Greater Grace World Outreach
- President: Louis DeMeo
- Location: Montpellier, France

The Theological and Missionary Institute (French: Institut Théologique & Missionnaire) is a nondenominational evangelical theological institute in Montpellier, France.

This institute was mainly known for its inclusion on the list of dangerous cults established by the Parliamentary Commission on Cults in France in the 1995 report, which led to a public controversy involving the American Department of State and several international associations which disapproved the decision.

== History ==
It was founded in 1989 in Uchaud as Theological Institute of Nîmes, by Louis DeMeo, a pastor of the American Greater Grace World Outreach Church. After several years of existence, the college was closed on the ground of "illegal operation of a private school", and moved to Montpellier in 1998 where it was renamed Theological and Missionary Institute.

== Reception ==
In France, the institute was classified as a cult in the 1995 parliamentary reports. Following this classification, pastor Louis DeMeo who directed the Institute testified before the United States Commission on International Religious Freedom, in Washington, DC, arguing violations of religious freedom by the French government. DeMeo said that his Institute underwent an alleged "persecution" just after the publication of the parliamentary report. He mentioned as examples an explosion and four burned cars by a stranger, problems of bank accounts for several ITN students, refusal of a building permit for a church, the fact that two members were fired from their jobs, accusations of brainwashing on children, and denial of access to a public hall. He said that the inclusion of ITN on the cults list was "extremely unjust, given the fact [they] have never been given an official hearing or explanation for [their] inclusion on this list", and generated discriminatory behaviors.

However, in spite of the ties of its founder with the American church, the ITN was organized as "an independent Baptist group". Expert of evangelical Protestantism Sébastien Fath said that the ITN was "originally characterized by voluntary isolation from all French evangelical existing networks", a "very pronounced anti-social speech, almost self-sufficient practices". He also said that it was in "considerable out of phase with its environment, coupled with a propensity for a victimizing reading of its situation (though more due to its wanted isolation than its religious identity)", but he also said that the situation would have changed since.

As the ITN is Baptist-oriented, which is one of the main religions in United States, its inclusion in the list of dangerous cults received much attention from the US Department of State which strongly criticized this decision and devoted to this four paragraphs in its 1999 Annual Report on Religious Freedom. The Institute received support from several organizations through their officials who defended it. For example, the Rutherford Institute, an international civil liberties and human rights legal defense organization, wrote to Alain Vivien, then member of the Mission interministérielle de lutte contre les sectes, to ask him to remove the ITN from the list of cults. Willy Fautré, a member of Human Rights Without Frontiers, criticized the fact that the ITN was presented in the media as "a disturbing tentacular organisation" and the pastor as a "guru". Member of the United States Department of State's Commission of International Religious Freedom Jeremy T. Gunn met the MILS on 6 April 1999 and discussed about the institute, reiterating DeMeo's claims to the anti-cult organization.

According to its critics, DeMeo's parent church, the Greater Grace World Outreach, would be "a fellow traveler of the Church of Scientology". The MILS pointed out that complaints for the cars destroyed were the subject of police investigations which were unable to attribute the origin of this incident to external responsibilities, because of a lack of evidence. In the press, former ITN followers criticized the institute for important calls for donation, pressures exerted on the followers, interventions in private life, family breakdowns and demonization of the external world.

On 27 May 2005, Prime minister Jean-Pierre Raffarin has officially distanced itself from the list of cult-like movements established in the 1995 parliamentary report.

== See also ==
- Governmental lists of cults and sects
