= Psychorock =

1976 comic book

- Cover of the French edition
- Author: Sergio Macedo
- Translator: Sean Kelly, Valerie Marchant
- Illustrator: Sergio Macedo
- Language: French
- Genre: Science fiction
- Publisher: Les Humanoïdes Associés
- Publication date: 1976
- Publication place: France
- Media type: Comic book
- Pages: 63
- ISBN: 2-902123-04-3
- OCLC: 123083143
- Dewey Decimal: 741.5944
- LC Class: PN6747.M3 P7313

Psychorock is a science fiction comic book short story collection written and illustrated by Sergio Macedo. It was published in 1976 by Les Humanoïdes Associés. The English version was published the next year by Heavy Metal Communications, translated into English by Sean Kelly and Valerie Marchant. The comic is split into five stories, some of which are directly related, all of which depict humanity being guided by benevolent aliens. The book received praise for its airbrushed art style and psychedelic illustrations.

== Background and publication history ==
The book was authored and illustrated by Brazilian artist Sergio Macedo, based in France, later Tahiti. Prior to creating the comic, he had illustrated the covers for several major comics anthologies. In creating Psychorock, he used an airbrush for his art; he called this tool the "synthesizer of drawing". The book, a softcover short comic strip collection, was originally written in French, published by Les Humanoïdes Associés, the publisher of the French science fiction and fantasy comics anthology series Métal Hurlant. It was published in Paris, France. This edition had 63 pages.

In 1977, an English translation was published by Heavy Metal Communications in New York City. Heavy Metal was the English-language version of Métal Hurlant, operated by the publishers of the American humor magazine National Lampoon; they issued several of their comics in English as "Heavy Metal presents" including Psychorock. The English translation was done by Sean Kelly and Valerie Marchant. This version was copyedited by Susan Devins and lettered by Harry Blumfield, and is 58 pages long.

== Plot ==
The comic is split into five stories, some of which are directly related, all of which depict humanity being guided by aliens of superior intelligence who are preparing mankind for a greater goal.

The first story, "Rockblitz", is about a violent biker named Rocky (Cliff in the French version); Rocky attacks a hippie for being on his turf, only to knock off his disguise and reveal him as an alien. The alien shoots him with a beam out of his head, leaving him changed and newly peaceful. He brings his gang together for a concert on hippie territory, which is actually a plan by the aliens to use "psychorock" to alter the human mind. The aliens raise the concert into space and the concertgoers talk with the aliens, who tell them their plan is to enlighten humanity.

"Point Gamma 3" has space travelers encounter an asteroid that emits powerful energy and cuts them off from communication to their base. An astronaut goes out to meet the asteroid, finding a telepathic cone-shaped crystal, which enlightens his consciousness and the consciousness of his companion, discovering that this whole exploration and all history has been puppeted by alien forces. He and his companion turn into their true identities as ethereal cosmic beings and fly into space. The home base finds their ship has disappeared entirely and left a mysterious coordinate.

The third story, "Orcyb", features two psychic astronauts, Keldryc and Astryd, who have a device that translates radiation from the stars, planets and plants around them into music. Their job is to locate an interdimensional galactic conference called Yamma, where extraterrestrial forces guide humanity's fate. A UFO arrives, telling them they may enter Yamma and scanning their neural codes before disappearing. Trusting their new psychic instincts, they pilot into the Sun, before they are met by Orcyb, a dark alien ship. Keldryc ventures out to meet it, and is confronted by an entity named Yurkon, who is his dark thoughts made manifest. He fights Yurkon mentally, assisted by Astryd using their music device, and another alien figure who offers him a sword. When he kills Yurkon, he snaps out of what appeared to be a dream to find a star has gone supernova near their ship.

"Nova", the fourth story, continues Keldryc and Astryd's story. Endangered by the supernova, they attempt to flee, only to be chased by a light that crashes into them. They are forcibly directed into the supernova and contacted by an interdimensional force, who tells them the supernova is a gate to Yamma, the "galactic hyperbrain". They are flown into the supernova, though fear it may kill them. The final, fifth story, "Yamma", has Keldryc and Astryd arrive in Yamma, becoming ethereal, enlightened figures, and discovering that they are the reincarnations of an ancient Atlantean couple abducted by the extraterrestrial beings, the only two people spared from the interdimensional beings' destruction of Atlantis; Atlantis had caused an "imbalance" due to their scientific practices. They meet Yamma, who now have the code to one day reintegrate earth with the cosmic higher consciousness.

== Themes and reception ==
Psychorock, a science fiction comic, explores cosmic themes and other forms of consciousness. The comic's smooth, airbrushed art style was noted by several reviewers. Joe McCulloch for The Comics Journal called Psychorock "truly a work that couldn't exist in quite this way at any other time, certainly not in English-translated form in an ostensibly mainstream comics outlet". He compared it to Chantal Montellier's 1996 comic strip. Frederick Patten, reviewing Psychorock for the Science Fiction and Fantasy Book Review alongside the other Heavy Metal presents books, called all of them "visually striking" and praised the translations as "uniformly excellent", recommending them for fans of fantasy. He noted their emphasis on gore and nudity made them suitable only for adults, which he said conflicted with the "sophomoric" plots. Speaking of Psychorock specifically, Patten argued it promoted the flower power generation of the 1960s in all five stories; he called the hippie elements of the plot slightly dated, but argued that people were still interested in plots about the interaction between aliens and humanity, comparing it to Childhood's End.

McCulloch called its illustrations both funny and eerie; he noted its depiction of aliens "benevolently fucking with the physiological and spiritual makeup of humanity through rock shows and lasers and nude combat,", as well as "giant-breasted women and long-haired hippie dudes [...] lounging bare in floating space gardens." He said that when giving the work to someone "their reaction is reliable befuddlement, generally in the form of 'what the hell, is this guy serious?'" A reviewer in Galerie, Jardin des Arts called it a "true revelation" and called Macedo a "new talent indeed". They said Macedo "plays with the conventions of pop culture while also drawing on the lessons of William Blake".
