= Timeless Voyage =

1982 comic book

- Cover of the 1982 French edition
- Author: Appel Guery
- Original title: Voyage Intemporel: Terre ciel connection
- Illustrator: Sergio Macedo
- Language: French
- Publisher: Editions Glénat
- Publication date: 1982
- Publication place: France
- Pages: 86
- ISBN: 2-7234-0283-5
- OCLC: 16908750

Timeless Voyage: Earth Sky Connection (French: Voyage Intemporel: Terre ciel connection) is a comic book, illustrated by Sergio Macedo and written by Appel Guery. It was published in 1982 by Editions Glénat. An English translation was published in 1987 by Transtar Pacific. The book's author, Appel Guery, was the leader of the UFO religion Siderella. The comic follows a group of UFO believers, influenced by a group of cosmic beings seeking to restore humanity from evil influences through a figure called Yogan. The chosen few are picked up by a flying saucer before the Earth is destroyed.

The comic carries the themes and beliefs of Siderella, with elements taken from Guery's life and others being fictional. The book later received attention for its connections to a different religious group, the Order of the Solar Temple (OTS), who committed mass suicide in Switzerland in 1994. Commentators highlighted its similarities to the OTS's actions and beliefs, and its strange and visionary elements.

== Plot ==
The book's preface was written by J.-S Marre, the introduction by Appel Guery, and the "post-face" by Macedo. It has one introductory story and five chapters. In the preface story, called Metamorphose Stellaire d'Ieros, the alien Prince of Unity Ieros, ruler of the Intemporel Palace, receives a message from the universe calling him to be the magical center of a new alliance. When Ieros takes off, his spaceship becomes the center of a new galaxy.

A realm of advanced beings watch the evolution of mankind, which initially is inclined towards psychological and mental evolution. However, after the fall of Atlantis, humanity was subject to corrupting influences, and becomes more inclined towards war, death, and evil. The "Earth 3 telepsychic intercommunication zone" is blocked because of this; the rules of the alliance say that the dimension must then be destroyed, but instead they decide to try to normalize the psychic energies of humanity. To do this, they give some select humans psychic powers, trying to see if this will spread a good mindset among them, but instead it strengthens both good and evil in mankind, and many with the powers use them for evil.

The alien beings are displeased by this, and they intervene and create an individual named Yogan, who they slowly gift advanced psychic abilities. Yogan is predestined to spread their message, talking of dimensions and temporal consciousness, with which he attracts followers and becomes enlightened. He achieves an advanced consciousness and astral projects, meeting the cosmic beings, who tell him of his mission, and how he can resist the negative influences that plague the Earth. He returns to prepare other humans for this new form of consciousness, and eventually forms a cult of UFO believers.

The Priests of the Abyss try to attack the Earth; to defend it, Yogan stages a rock concert, which uses the power of its attendees to focus their energy as a shield against evil. Despite this, the Priests of the Abyss once more attempt an attack, resulting in wars occurring all over the Earth and the alienation of Yogan's followers. The remaining members of humanity who have purified themselves enough are taken away to Vessel-Earth by flying saucers, called cosmic vessels, before an event called the great mutation destroys the Earth, with the Earth opening and freeing a giant spaceship, where the purified human beings are put. The remaining "evolving" humans will eventually join them.

== Background and publication ==
The comic was published in France in 1982 by Editions Glénat, as Voyage intemporel. It was written by Appel Guery and illustrated by Sergio Macedo. An English translation, Timeless Voyage: Earth Sky Connection, was published by Transtar Pacific in Tahiti in 1987. This version has 103 pages. It sold 30,000 copies in France with 3 editions, and was published in four other countries; the publisher estimated its readership in all countries at about 150,000.

The comic was written by Appel Guery (real name Jean-Paul Appel), who was the founder and leader of a UFO religion called Siderella. The group's activities centered around preparing for contact with aliens, and group sex. In writing the comic, Guery claimed he was inspired by "a source more extraterrestrial than human". Macedo had joined this group in 1980, after which he supposedly received visions of extraterrestrials, which would feature more prominently in his works from then on.

In the introduction of the English version of the book, Guery states that it was not "just a comic strip just a little out of the ordinary. But rather, it’s a true story, a strange as that may seem, that has been lived in majority by a certain number of people". In creating the work, the text was given to Macedo, but the comic scenario was created by him as the supplied text was very literary and was based directly on Guery's life. He said that in creating the work, he had enjoyed the challenge both spiritually and graphically, and that he had been attracted to the project because of its positive ending. The title of the story refers to the astral journeys of the protagonist.

== Themes and reception ==
Religious historian Jean-François Mayer called it not "merely a comic strip", as it was a message of the beliefs of Siderella. He compared it to the apocalypse in the Book of Revelation, put into New Age terms. The fictional parts of the story are mixed with the group's beliefs, and also parts from Guery's life. The Swiss magazine L'Illustré called it a "very strange comic strip", saying it was full of "magnificent beings in search of a luminous beyond." Religious scholars J. Gordon Melton and George M. Eberhart listed the work in their bibliography of contactee literature in 1995.

Matheus Silva viewed the comic as carrying more intense cosmic themes than previous works of Macedo, attributing this to his influence by Siderella. Silva viewed it as continuing the formula from a previous work of Macedo, Caraïbe, and argued the story represented the visions of "expanded states of consciousness". The plot contains the basic message of the Siderella group, of the background of reality and Earth being a "place of psycho-mental evolution"; Silva interpreted the message as having a visionary quality, like Macedo's other works, which was embodied by Yogan. Silva argued Yogan appeared as a "kind of spokesperson for the universe" in the work, who mirrored Guery's actual group.

=== Solar Temple ===
It later received some attention for its connection to the Order of the Solar Temple. After the comic came out, the religious group (often called a cult) bought hundreds of copies and distributed it within the movement as recommended reading. The comic was also sold at one of the OTS leader's (Luc Jouret) seminars, who used it as a visual for many of the speeches he gave on topics related to the apocalypse and contact with aliens. The Solar Temple would later go on to commit mass suicide in Switzerland in 1994, thinking that by killing themselves, they would not die but "transit"; one possible method for this transit was that they would be picked up and taken to another world by a flying saucer.

A researcher of the group, Jean-François Mayer, noted their interest in the book as showing the members of the group were familiar with the concept, and a sign that they had perhaps initially interpreted the suicide as being saved from disaster. Discussing it in the aftermath of the Solar Temple suicides, the Swiss magazine L'Illustré said that it took on a "particular resonance" and was "fiercely premonitory" in light of the OTS's interest in it. They also argued that, given the themes of the work, it was not surprising that the group had approved of it. Following the publication of L'Illustré's article on the comic, Guery's publishing agent from Transtar denied any contact with any members of the OTS, and said the work told a fictional story. He said Guery denied any responsibility for the OTS's usage of the work, and disapproved of what he called tragic events.
