= Sergio Macedo =

Brazilian comic artist (born 1951)

- Born: 8 April 1951 (age 75); Além Paraíba, Minas Gerais, Brazil
- Notable work: Psychorock, Timeless Voyage, Vic Voyage, Lakota
- Awards: Prêmio Angelo Agostini for Master of National Comics; 2022

Sergio Macedo (born 8 April 1951) is a Brazilian comic artist. Born in Além Paraíba, he pursued a career in illustrating for advertising and journalism, before illustrating for Brazilian newspapers and magazines. In the 1970s, he moved to France, where he published comics in the publications Métal Hurlant and Heavy Metal. He eventually moved to French Polynesia, where he published several comics, many of which focus on the indigenous peoples of the region and others. Other works focus on aliens and esoteric themes.

== Early life ==
Sergio Macedo was born in Além Paraíba, Minas Gerais, Brazil. He began drawing early in life. In 1954, he moved to Juiz de Fora. He credited his artistic inspiration as a child to both foreign and Brazilian comic book artists, as well as realist artists. Later on, in the late 60s and early 1970s, he became inspired by American and French underground comic artists. He was self taught.

== Career ==
He pursued a career in illustrations for advertising and journalism. Newspapers he contributed illustrations to in Brazil included Estado de São Paulo and Folha de São Paulo; he also contributed to the magazine Planeta. He had a solo exhibition, his first, at the Celina Art Gallery in 1970. He was sent to prison in 1972 for six months. He gained perks after he drew art for the prison guards, which resulted in better treatment. From 1972 to 1973, he would publish his comics in the magazine Grilo. About that time, he and several friends founded the newspaper SOMA, which they sold on the street during Brazil's period of military dictatorship. He was interested in psychedelics, but stopped in 1975, as he viewed it as a lazy method instead of pursuing inner effort to achieve the results he wanted. In the 1970s, he was for a time associated with the German band Kraftwerk.

He moved to Europe in 1974, where he illustrated for the Dutch magazine Bres. He then moved to France, and began publishing comics in Métal Hurlant, Circus, Heavy Metal, as well as the educational magazines J'Ai Lu, Fiction, and Galaxie. He also contributed to the Neutron and Sexbulles magazines. His first album of comics was published in 1975 by Kesselring, publishing Psychorock and Telechamp in the following years with Les Humanoïdes Associés. He created the Vic Voyage series of comics in the 1980s, first published in Circus magazine, an adventure and mystery series focusing on a man who discovers that he is of alien origin. The series was later continued through the Aedena and Vaisseau d'argent publishers.

== Works and reception ==
Most of his bibliography is unpublished in his home country of Brazil; while well known abroad, he is little known there. In 1989, the Swiss newspaper 24 heures said Macedo's art was of "a rare purity" and that he displayed an "ecologist-mystico-baba-futurist philosophy". Earlier in 1976, a critic from the same paper had negatively described his work in Circus, calling him "promising but long-winded" with an "annoying cosmic bucolicism", and that it was less funny than usual.

Many of his works take place in Pacific sea settings. Several of his works focus on indigenous peoples, as well as aliens and extraterrestrial contact. Motifs in his art include esoteric, cabalistic and visionary themes and elements. Following his joining the UFO religion Siderella, his works focused increasingly on extraterrestrial themes. His art has been noted for its characteristic metallic smoothness, with detailed renderings alongside heavy airbrushed highlights. His artwork is styled in a realist manner, utilizing airbrush and gouache. Joe McCulloch of The Comics Journal noted Macedo as a "smooth-edged artist", comparing him to Angus McKie, calling him "one of a class that basically vanished forever" from North American comics following the end of the Heavy Metal publication. He named Wallace Woody, Norman Rockwell, N. C. Wyeth, Inácio Justo, Jayme Cortez, Philippe Druillet, Caza, Richard Corben, and Winslow Homer as inspirations. Later in his career he named nature as his biggest inspiration.

In 2007, Macedo received the 2007 HQMIX award in the Great Master category. Macedo was one of four people to win the Prêmio Angelo Agostini for Master of National Comics award in 2022.

=== Psychorock (1976) ===
Psychorock was published in 1976. The English version was published the next year. The comic is split into five stories, all of which depict humanity being guided by a greater cosmic intellect. McCulloch described Psychorock as "a work that couldn't exist in quite this way at any other time, certainly not in English-translated form in an ostensibly mainstream comics outlet", calling its illustrations both funny and eerie. He noted its depiction of aliens, as well as "giant-breasted women and long-haired hippie dudes [...] lounging bare in floating space gardens." Science Fiction and Fantasy Book Review argued it promoted the flower power generation of the 1960s in all five stories; they called the hippie elements of the plot slightly dated, but argued that people were still interested in plots about the interaction between aliens and humanity.

=== Voyage Intemporel (1982) ===
In 1982, Macedo illustrated the comic Voyage Intemporel. It was written by Appel Guery, the guru of Siderella, of which Macedo was a member, who also lived in Tahiti. This comic focuses on a group of UFO believers who are taken away by a flying saucer before a great cataclysm destroys the earth. It later received some attention for its connection to two cult leaders. After the comic came out, the religious group the Order of the Solar Temple bought hundreds of copies and distributed it within the movement as recommended reading; they later committed mass suicide in Switzerland in 1994 in a way seen as similar to the group's actions in the comic.

=== Vic Voyage (1983–1989) ===
Macedo created a comic book series centered around the eponymous Vic Voyage, an ocean adventurer who is instructed by the gods to teach humanity how to live in harmony with nature, and if not, initiate the apocalypse. It had five books, published from 1983 to 1989.

=== Lakota (1996) ===
Asked which of his own works was the best, he picked Lakota. Published in the United States, the book received the Benjamin Franklin Award in 1997 for the best multicultural work. The book is an illustrated one from the point of view of the Lakota people in the Indian wars; Wild West praised the artistic quality and the historical ties present in the work, though noted not everyone would agree with Macedo's view of history.

== Personal life ==
In 1980, he joined Appel Guery's UFO group Siderella, after which he supposedly received visions of extraterrestrials. He moved to Moʼorea in French Polynesia in 1982, in what the Brazilian newspaper Folha de S.Paulo described as a "search of the hippie dream"; he stated he "got used to living barefoot." Another commentator says he moved to French Polynesia with Guery. He said that while he liked moving to different places and discovering new cultures, he disliked the cold of Europe and the "gray and sad view" of life he perceived Europeans as having. Macedo surfs regularly. In an interview he stated that he had never owned a television. He is married to a Tahitian woman.

== Bibliography ==
- —— (1973). O Karma de Gargoot (in Portuguese). Massao Ohno.
- —— (1975). Fume, c'est du Macedo (in French). Kesselring.
- —— (1976). Psychorock (in French). Les Humanoïdes Associés.
- —— (1978). Telechamp (in French). Les Humanoïdes Associés.
- —— (1981). Caraïbe (in French). Éditions Glénat.
- —— (1982). Voyage Intemporel (in French). Éditions Glénat.
- —— (1982). Les Aventures de Mike the Bike et Molly (in French). Editions Neptune.
- —— (1983). Eldorado 1: Le trésor de Paititi. Vic Voyage (in French). Éditions Glénat.
- —— (1985). Eldorado 2: A la recherche d'Agharta. Vic Voyage (in French). Éditions Glénat.
- —— (1985). Pacifique Sud 1. Vic Voyage (in French). Éditions Aedena.
- —— (1986). Pacifique Sud 2: Le mystère des atolls. Vic Voyage (in French). Éditions Aedena.
- —— (1989). Brazil!. Vic Voyage (in Portuguese). Le Vaisseau d'argent. (later published in 2007 in Brazil as Xingu!)
- —— (1996). Lakota: An Illustrated History. Treasure Chest Publications.
- —— (2000). Honu iti ē. CTRDP.
- —— (2002). La Légende de Tuivao (in French). Éditions des Mers Australes.
- —— (2003). Te Tere O Te Tupuna. CTRDP.
- —— (2012). Povos Indígenas em Quadrinhos (in Brazilian Portuguese). Zarabatana Books.
