= Vic Voyage =

Comic series by Sergio Macedo

- Cover of the first book
- Eldorado 1: Le trésor de Paititi; Eldorado 2: A la recherche d'Agharta; Pacifique Sud 1; Pacifique Sud 2: Le mystère des atolls; Brazil!
- Author: Sergio Macedo
- Illustrator: Sergio Macedo
- Country: France
- Language: French
- Genre: Adventure, fantasy
- Publisher: Glénat Éditions; Éditions Aedena; Le Vaisseau d'argent
- Published: 1983–1989
- Media type: Comic book
- No. of books: 5

Vic Voyage is a series of fantasy-adventure comic books created by Brazilian author and illustrator Sergio Macedo. The comic centers around the eponymous Vic Voyage, a mysterious ocean adventurer instructed by the gods to teach humanity how to live in harmony with nature, and if not, initiate the apocalypse. The series explores New Age and science fiction themes, as well as narratives focusing on indigenous peoples.

The comic series was pre-published in Circus from 1982 to 1984. Originally published in France and in the French language, the book series has five entries, the first coming in 1983 and the last in 1989. The first book, Eldorado 1: Le trésor de Paititi, was published in 1983 by Glénat Éditions. The series received a largely positive critical reception for its characters, depictions of indigenous peoples, and illustrations, though some commentators criticized it as kitschy or the plot as clumsy.

== Entries ==
1. Eldorado 1: Le trésor de Paititi (1983)
2. Eldorado 2: A la recherche d'Agharta (1985)
3. Pacifique Sud 1 (1985)
4. Pacifique Sud 2: Le mystère des atolls (1986)
5. Brazil! (1989)

== Plot ==
The comic centers around the eponymous protagonist Vic Voyage, a "super boatman" and ocean adventurer of unknown origin. Beginning in Eldorado 1: Le trésor de Païtiti, he is taken in and raised by the captain of an Australian ship he develops an interest in the Pacific Ocean's mysteries. The series contains a New Age and science fiction based narrative. Vic Voyage has been instructed by the gods of the world to teach humanity how to resolve its conflicts and learn to live in harmony with nature, but if that fails, he is instructed to usher in the apocalypse and warn humanity. He travels throughout the oceans on his ship, the Tropicalis, with his friends. Other characters include Vic Voyage's friends Ralf von Samba, Doctor Jah, and Rita, who he meets on his travels. In Eldorado 2: A la recherche d'Agharta, Vic Voyage travels with Rita to find the mythical city of Aghartha.

In Pacifique Sud 1 and Pacifique Sud 2: Le mystère des atolls, Vic Voyage travels and sees the mysteries of the pacific. He meets advanced spirits while accompanying rich tourists to Pacific Islands, whereupon he travels into an underwater temple and receives a prophecy for the Earth. Brazil! has Vic Voyage being invited to visit Pantanal in Mato Grosso. With a group of adventurers, they visit the Xingu Indigenous Park, where they live with the indigenous Kayapo, learning their way of life and encountering the problems they face, such as land disputes, harsh treatment by white Brazilians, and the destruction of nature and invasions. Though fictional, the book incorporates real events as well as real and fictional characters. It depicts several mystical visions had by its characters. The book depicts a fictionalization of the visions of Raoni Metuktire. Raoni told Macedo he received a vision that he would later become a great leader to his people, which Macedo recounted as involving an "astral ship"; he did later become a significant indigenous leader after the book's publication. Macedo also said the book recounted a personal vision he had experienced of a "deva from Xingu, whom I saw in the astral plane".

== Background and publication history ==
The series was written and illustrated by Brazilian comic artist Sergio Macedo. Though Macedo was from Brazil, he primarily created and worked with French comics and the series was published in France. Apart from the books, the comic series was pre-published in Circus from 1982 to 1984. Its first entry, Eldorado 1: Le trésor de Paititi (transl. El Dorado 1: The Treasure of Paititi), was published by Glénat Éditions in 1983. The sequel Eldorado 2: A la recherche d'Agharta (transl. El Dorado 2: Seeking the Aghartha) was published in 1985 by the same publisher. Later the same year, the third Vic Voyage book, Pacifique Sud (transl. South Pacific), was published by Éditions Aedena. Its direct sequel, Pacifique Sud 2: Le mystère des atolls (transl. South Pacific 2: The Mystery of the Atolls), was published the next year by the same publisher.

The fifth and final entry in the series, Brazil! was published in Europe in 1989 by Le Vaisseau d'argent. In 2007, it was republished in Brazil by Devir as Xingu! It is 72 pages long. According to Macedo, the book is based on his experience living with the Kayapo people with his wife for several months in 1987; he credited this period as teaching him about the problems indigenous people had faced and life more generally. He obtained official permission to have contacts with indigenous peoples in the region of several ethnic groups, particularly the Xavante and the Kayapo; he said of his works with them that he had shown them to the indigenous peoples and gotten their approval before publication. Vic Voyage has been described as Macedo's "alter ego" as a character; he experiences situations which Macedo claimed happened to him.

== Reception ==
Henri Filippini praised Vic Voyage for having a fantastic and mystical universe. He praised its art as very realistic and the series for what he called beautiful, well-represented characters. He criticized the plot as clumsy and utopian. Le Nouvelliste praised Pacifique Sud 2 and called its illustrations "hyper-realistic" with an "almost magical usage of color". They also complimented its narrative as "breathtaking"; overall, they called it an "excellent and long-awaited" work. The Journal de Nyon called it "an apotheosis of mind-blowing kitsch" with little depth instead of symbolism, comparing it to a bad American TV show. Despite this the reviewer called it "not unpleasant".

The Brazilian newspaper Folha de S.Paulo, reviewing Xingu!, praised it as "faithfully show[ing] elements of everyday life in the villages, such as handicrafts, body painting, shamanism, the forest and animals". 24 heures's Thierry Mayer positively reviewed it, calling it a "veritable manifesto in the form of a hymn to the Amazonian Indians" and praising its illustrations and its providing of "food for thought" to the reader. He said Macedo's artwork, which he described as "strikingly truthful" authenticated the subject matter and further praised its balance of a variety of narrative elements. He did note that Macedo had included a "few kitschy space-time visions" in the work. Scholar Guillaume Molle praised the third book, Pacifique Sud, as giving a voice to the Polynesian natives reflecting on the impact of Christian missionaries to their traditional religious practice, despite the sci-fi narrative. He praised it for what he called a very accurate depiction of Polynesian life.
