= Dozulé =

- Commune
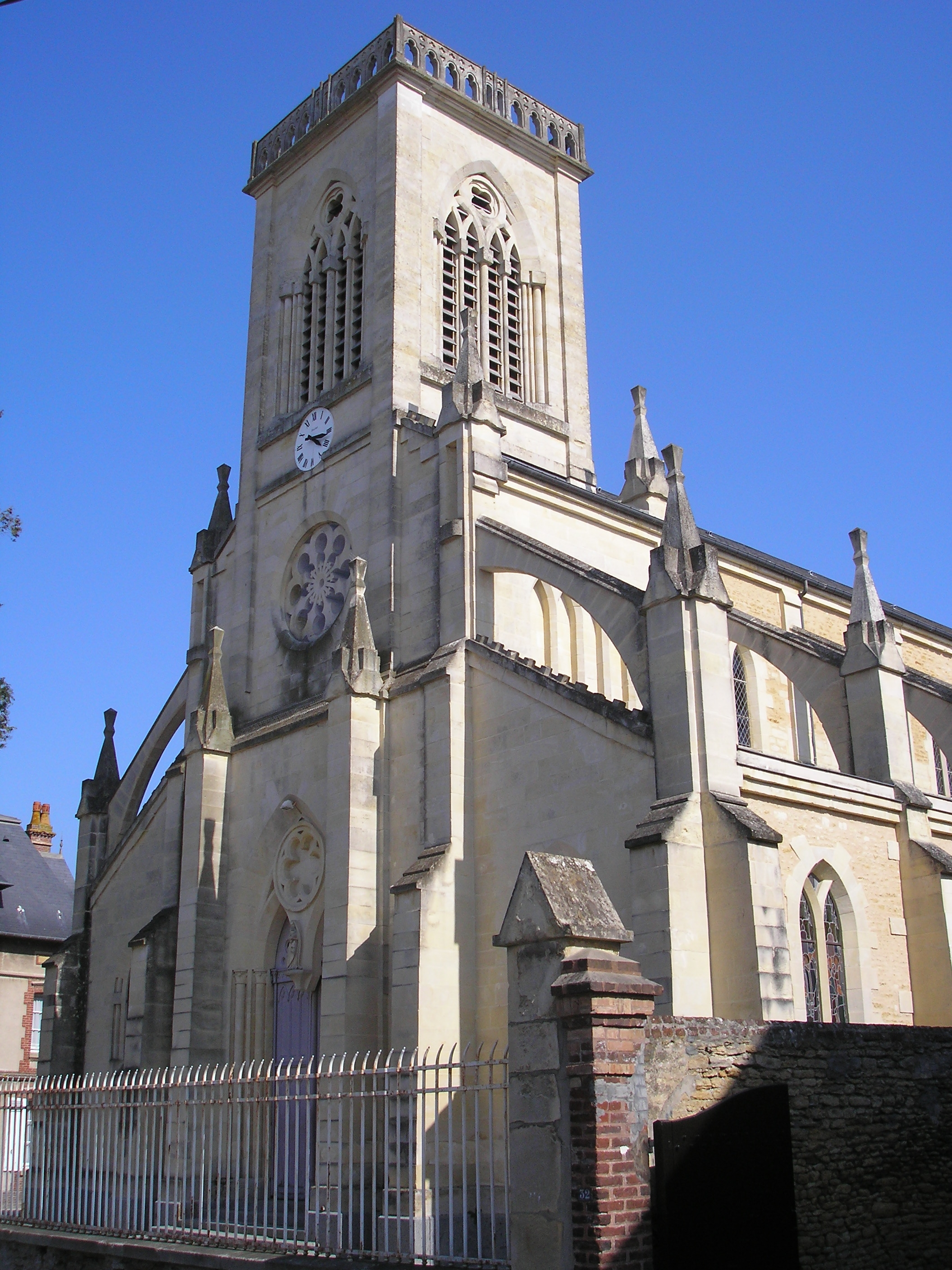
- The church in Dozulé

- Coat of arms
- Location of Dozulé
- Location within France Location within Normandy
- Coordinates: 49°13′57″N 0°02′31″W
- Country: France
- Region: Normandy
- Department: Calvados
- Arrondissement: Lisieux
- Canton: Cabourg
- Intercommunality: CC Normandie-Cabourg-Pays d'Auge

Government
  - Mayor (2020–2026): Sophie Gaugain
- Area^{1}: 5.23 km^{2} (2.02 sq mi)
- Elevation: 22 m (72 ft)
- Highest elevation: 139 m (456 ft)
- Lowest elevation: 8 m (26 ft)
- Population (2023): 2,244
  - Density: 429/km^{2} (1,110/sq mi)
- Time zone: UTC+01:00 (CET)
  - Summer (DST): UTC+02:00 (CEST)
- INSEE/Postal code: 14229 /14430
- ^{1} French Land Register data, which excludes lakes, ponds, glaciers > 1 km^{2} (0.386 sq mi or 247 acres) and river estuaries.

Dozulé (French pronunciation: [dɔzyle]) is a commune in the Calvados department in the Normandy region in northern France.

== Population ==
Historical population
Year	Pop.	±% p.a.
1968	984	—
1975	1,279	+3.82%
1982	1,407	+1.37%
1990	1,515	+0.93%
1999	1,615	+0.71%
2007	1,868	+1.84%
2012	2,022	+1.60%
2017	2,284	+2.47%
2023	2,244	−0.29%
Source: INSEE

== The apparitions and the Glorious Cross ==
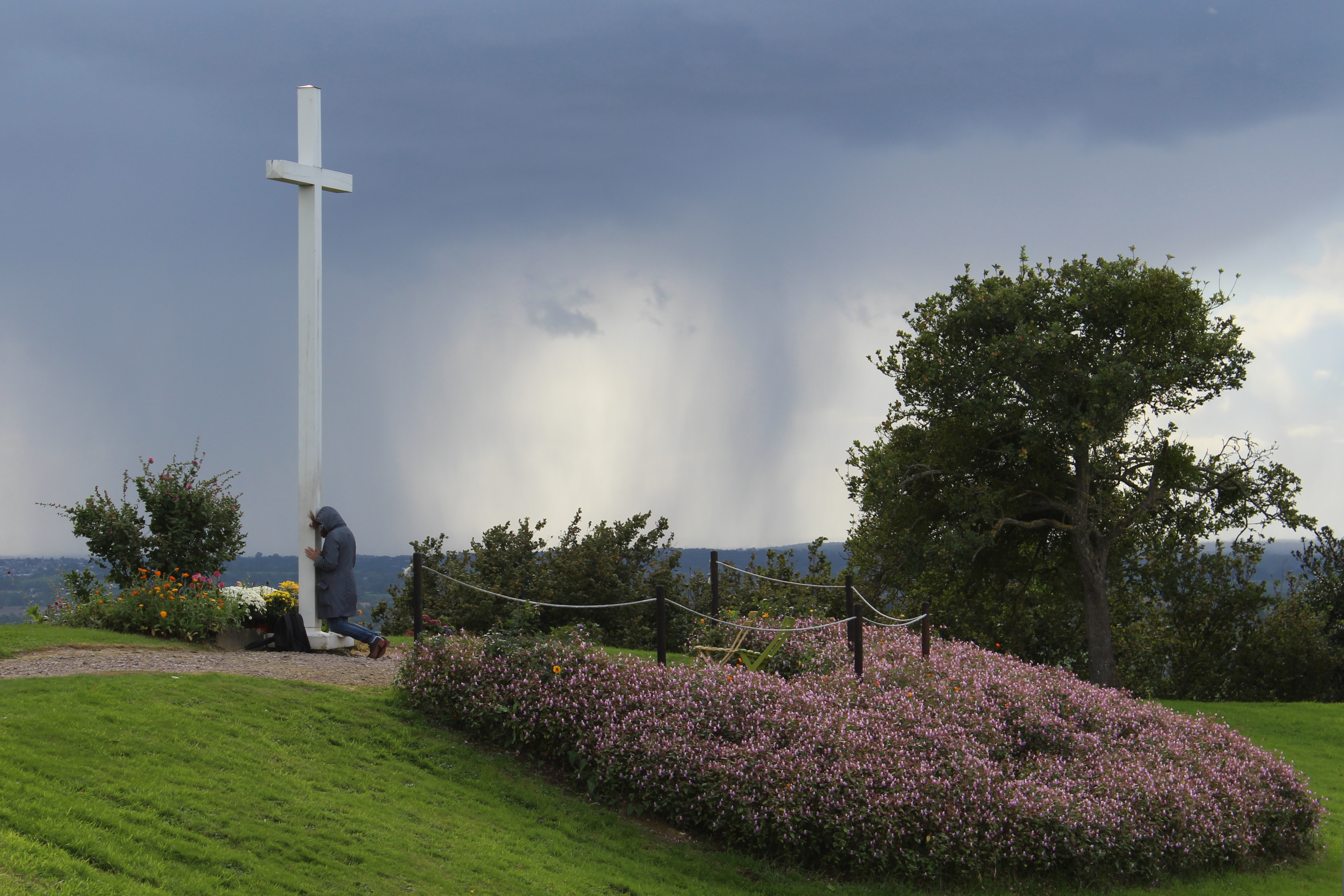
The current Cross of Dozulé in the place of its famous first apparition to Madeleine Aumount in 1972.

Between 1972 and 1978, Jesus Christ is said to have appeared 49 times in Dozulé to Madeleine Aumont, a mother of five children, in the presence of her parish priest Victor L'Horset and other faithful people. He is believed to have dictated a series of messages, containing teachings and warnings for all people, according to those who believed in them. Among them is the daily Prayer of Dozulé. The messages are seen as an annunciation of the return of Christ. There is also the Glorious Cross, an illuminated Catholic cross coloured white and blue, 7.38 m (24.2 ft) tall with arms 1.23 m (4 ft 0 in) long. The exact ratio of 3 between the vertical and horizontal lengths is based on the reported visions.

The followers of the messages of Dozulé believe also that they are the continuation of the Three Secrets of Fátima and that they ask, for the conversion of humanity to avoid a material and spiritual catastrophe.

Bishop Jean Badré was critical of the authenticity of the sightings in 1983. In a letter signed by Víctor Manuel Fernández, the Dicastery for the Doctrine of the Faith ruled in 2025 that the claimed apparitions of Jesus were not of supernatural origin. Pope Leo XIV approved the letter on November 3.

== International relations ==
Dozulé is twinned with Leonard Stanley, a village in Gloucestershire, in the United Kingdom.

== See also ==
- Glorious Cross of Dozulé
- Communes of the Calvados department
