= About–Picard law =

French anti-cult law

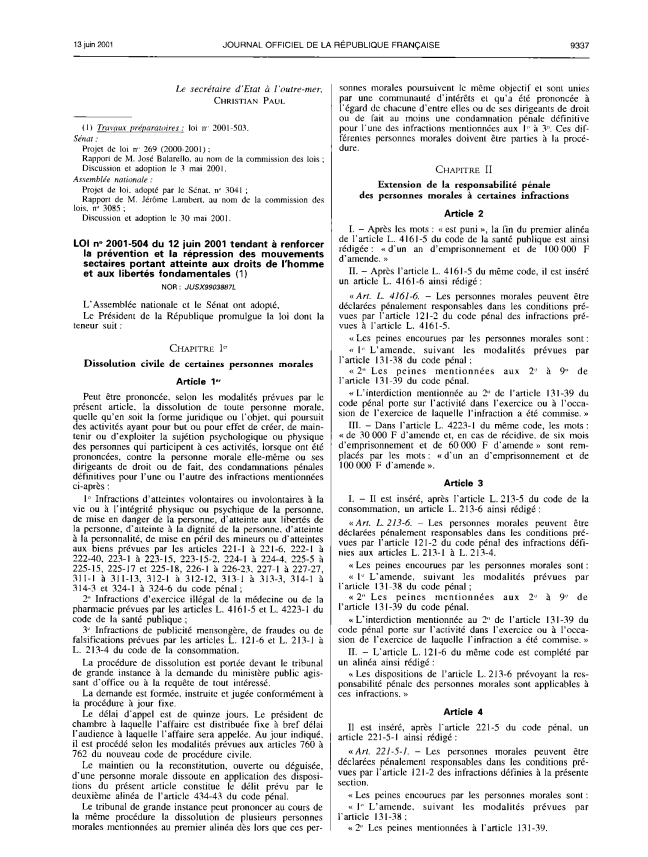
The Law as published in the Journal Officiel de la République Française

The 2001 About–Picard law [abu pika:r], officially the loi n° 2001-504 du 12 juin 2001 tendant à renforcer la prévention et la répression des mouvements sectaires portant atteinte aux droits de l'homme et aux libertés fondamentales, (Note: lit. 'Law No. 2001-504 of June 12, 2001, aimed at strengthening the prevention and repression of sectarian movements that undermine human rights and fundamental freedoms') is French legislation passed by the National Assembly in 2000. The law is targeted at movements deemed to be "cults" (sectes) that "undermine human rights and fundamental freedoms", as well as "mental manipulation". The law has caused controversy internationally, with some commentators alleging that it infringes on religious freedom while proponents contend that it reinforces religious freedom.

== Background ==
Freedom of religion and separation of church and state have formed part of the French idea of the state since at least the French Revolution and in some ways long before, since the 16th-century period of the Reformation and of the Wars of Religion. Separation of religion and state in France takes the form of laïcité, by which political power avoids interference in the sphere of religious dogma, and religion avoids interference in public policies. The French understand "freedom of religion" primarily as the freedom of the individual to believe or not to believe what any religion teaches. Also, because of a long history of one single dominating church—the Catholic Church—the French state sees its duty less in protecting religion from state interference than in protecting the individual from interference by religion.

In the wake of the Order of the Solar Temple murders and suicides, the French Parliament established the Parliamentary Commission on Cults in France to investigate cults. In December 1995, the Commission delivered a report on cults which caused much controversy, some of it due to a list extracted from an internal study on purported cults by the Renseignements généraux (RG), the French National Police intelligence service.

Following the recommendations of the report, Prime Minister Alain Juppé set up in 1996 the "Interministerial Board of Observation of sects", followed in 1998 by the "Interministerial Mission in the Fight Against Sects" (MILS). In 2002 the "Interministerial Monitoring Mission Against Sectarian Abuses" (MIVILUDES) replaced MILS. Other action of the French government against potential abuses by cults resulted in the passing of the About–Picard law.

== The About–Picard law ==
Commentators often refer to the Law 2001-504 of June 12, 2001 as the About–Picard law, from the name of its rapporteurs (parliamentarians who report upon the draft law), senator Nicolas About (UDF center-right party) and deputy Catherine Picard (PS center-left party).

The French parliament adopted the law with broad cross-party support under the government of center-right president Jacques Chirac and socialist prime minister Lionel Jospin.

Article 223-15-2 of Penal code:
(Act no. 2001-504 of June 12, 2001, article 10 Official Journal of June 13, 2001; Ordinance No. 2000-916 of September 19, 2000, article 3 Official Journal of September 22, 2000, into force January 1, 2002)

Fraudulently abusing the ignorance or state of weakness of a minor, or of a person whose particular vulnerability, due to age, sickness, infirmity, to a physical or psychological disability or to pregnancy, is apparent or known to the offender, or abusing a person in a state of physical or psychological dependency resulting from serious or repeated pressure or from techniques used to affect his judgement, in order to induce the minor or other person to act or abstain from acting in any way seriously harmful to him, is punished by three years' imprisonment and a fine of €375,000. Where the offence is committed by the legal or de facto manager of a group that carries out activities the aim or effect of which is to create, maintain or exploit the psychological or physical dependency of those who participate in them, the penalty is increased to five years' imprisonment and to a fine of €750,000.

The additional penalties that natural or legal persons may incur are mentioned in the following articles 223-15-3 and 4.

=== Main points ===
Notable new points introduced by the law include:

- In the case of certain crimes, the law extends legal responsibility from individuals to organizations (corporations, associations, and other legal entities...).
- Courts can order the dissolution of organizations if they or their executives have been found guilty of these crimes.

The initial draft of the About–Picard law included the criminalization of "mental manipulation". Many organizations criticised this clause for its vagueness. Minister of Justice Élisabeth Guigou pushed for the removal of this clause, which the legislators excluded from the final version of the law. However, the law makes it a crime to defraud a person weakened by illness, old age, etc., but also of a person in a state of psychological or physical subjection resulting from grave or reiterated pressures or techniques able to alter judgement.

=== Application ===
The first application of the law was its usage against Arnaud Mussy, leader of the Néo-Phare, a small apocalyptic group. Mussy claimed to be Jesus Christ and declared the apocalypse was approaching. In 2002 one of his followers killed himself, and two more were alleged to have attempted suicide. Mussy was charged using the law's provision for "abuse of weakness", and after a high profile trial, was declared guilty. He was sentenced to a three-year suspended prison sentence and €115,000 fine. He appealed the sentence, but it was upheld 6 June 2005. The verdict was celebrated by anti-cultists. Mussy later stated that "It was clear the National Assembly had a new law and they wanted to try it out on some little group to make an example—not a big powerful [cult] like Scientology that has lots of money to defend itself. I have no money. I knew I could not win." Cult researcher Susan J. Palmer argued that the application of the brainwashing concept in this specific case was flawed, even apart from the wider concerns about the legitimacy of the concept and how it is supposed to be proven.

== Criticism ==
The law has caused controversy internationally, with some commentators alleging that it infringes on religious freedom while proponents contend that it reinforces religious freedom.

The government has taken the position that it will deal with the concrete consequences of cult affiliation, especially with respect to children. The government sees this as particularly important in the light of past abuse committed in some criminal cults, such as sexual slavery and mass suicide. The French government, when challenged on issues of religious discrimination, states that it has no concern in any way with religious doctrine per se and focuses exclusively on harmful conduct. According to government sources, none of the criteria listed in related government documents on sects discuss theology; they only focus on the actions and the methods of the groups.

=== Reactions inside France ===
The Bishop of Soissons, Marcel Herriot, defended the law on June 25, 2000, asserting it was necessary to protect by law persons, family, society and religions themselves from sects that are violating fundamental freedoms and human dignity.

Human rights activists dubbed the law "un délit d'opinion" (a thought crime).

=== Reactions outside of France ===
In an open letter dated June 2000 to Alain Vivien about religious freedom in France, Aaron Rhodes, Executive Director of the International Helsinki Federation for Human Rights (IHFHR), wrote:

We question ourselves how such a law can claim to guarantee human rights when it goes against the rights of association, expression, religion and conscience; when it puts in danger the right of minorities and maintains prejudices that are so incompatible with the concept of tolerance intrinsic to that of human rights. France must deal with its responsibilities and obligations as a signatory for the International Conventions and respect the European laws and its interpretation by the Court of Strasbourg, before one of its citizens become a victim of discrimination due to the law which you propose.

Alain Vivien responded: "[The IHFHR] seems today to have passed into the hands of Scientologists and perhaps other transnational organizations". Aaron Rhodes then acknowledged that the Moscow office of the IHFHR had received funding from the Church of Scientology to print a leaflet about religious freedom in Russia, and voiced his astonishment at the charge. Rhodes voiced his embarrassment: "[...]for you and your fellow French citizens by your recourse to methods of denunciations and insinuations that remind us of those sometimes used by totalitarian and backward regimes."

==== Reactions by the US government ====
In the United States, the Church of Scientology utilised pressure groups against the French government, and had some success with the Clinton administration, which repeatedly brought the matter before the French government. According to pastor Jean-Arnold de Clermont, head of the French Protestant federation and himself a strong critic of the first draft of the law, the complaints originating in the United States concerning religious freedom in France were largely based on biased, poor information.

According to a newspaper article published in The Guardian in June 2000, the French government considered American interference regarding religious freedom in France as unwarranted meddling by the US government in France's internal affairs. Paul Webster wrote that President Jacques Chirac told Clinton that religious freedom would no longer be a subject for bilateral presidential talks, "in the light of what has been officially described as 'shocking' White House support for Scientologists and Moonies". The French government also described the United States Congress's introduction of laws protecting religious freedom internationally as "an unacceptable intrusion into internal affairs". Alain Vivien, former chairman of the French ministerial mission to combat the influence of cults (MILS), and the president of the Centre Contre les Manipulations Mentales (Centre Against Mental Manipulation), said many observers believed that Clinton was making his peace with big religious movements, "because they offer an indispensable source of political financing", and that with the help of Scientologists, cults were infiltrating UN and European human rights associations and collaborating on virulent reports against France's policies.

The French did not alter their law following these requests; and the claims and actions of the US government regarding the religious situation in France largely ceased with the Bush administration.

Some critics of French legislation have voiced concerns that countries which do not have the same legal safeguards and constitutional rights as France may emulate this legislation. In the words of a US official:

Yet the law itself remains problematic not only because of the threat the language carries in France, but because it is even now being considered for emulation by countries that lack France’s commitment to rule of law and human rights. Such a model serves only too well as cover for those nations who persecute under the guise of law enforcement.

On September 15, 2006, the United States Bureau of Democracy, Human Rights, and Labor released a report on religious freedom in France. This report noted that "The constitution provides for freedom of religion, and the Government generally respected this right in practice." It reported mostly anonymous concerns over repression of religious freedom in France, notably in regards to what the report referred to in one case as "cult groups", as well as the law banning religious symbols in schools, and rising anti-semitism in France.
