= Roselle Cros =

French politician (born 1947)

Roselle Cros (born 27 August 1947) is a French politician. She represented the department of Yvelines in the French Senate as a member of the Union of Democrats and Independents – UC from 23 January 2011 to 30 September 2011.

Cros worked as a teacher and then was director general of services for the commune of Le Pecq from 1983 to 2000. She was regional councillor for Ile-de-France from 2004 to 2010 as a member of the Democratic Movement.

Cros replaced Nicolas About, who was named to the Conseil supérieur de l'audiovisuel, in the Senate. She was defeated when she ran for reelection in 2011.
