= Nicolas About =

French politician (born 1947)

Mayor of Montigny-le-Bretonneux
- In office 1977–2004
- Succeeded by: Michel Laugier
- Constituency: Montigny-le-Bretonneux

Senator from Yvelines
- In office 24 September 1995 – 23 January 2011
- Succeeded by: Roselle Cros
- Constituency: Yvelines, France

President of the Centrist Union Group
- In office 7 July 2009 – 23 January 2011
- Preceded by: Michel Mercier

Personal details
- Born: 14 July 1947 (age 78) France
- Party: MoDem

Nicolas About (born 14 July 1947) is a French politician and anti-cultist from the centrist MoDem. He was a member of the French Senate and President of the Centrist Union group. About was the mayor of Montigny-le-Bretonneux from 1977 to 2004. He was elected senator of Yvelines on 24 September 1995 and reelected on 26 September 2004. With Catherine Picard, he helped draft the About-Picard law on 12 June 2001.

== Biography ==
Medical doctor by training and member of the Democratic Socialist Movement, he was elected mayor of Montigny-le-Bretonneux in 1977 and then deputy the following year, becoming the youngest deputy-mayor in France. He lost his seat as deputy during the change of government in 1981.

He then became Senate (France) for Yvelines on September 24, 1995, and was re-elected on September 26, 2004. He was elected president of the Union Centriste group on July 7, 2009. On January 25, 2010, he joined the presidential majority list led by Valérie Pécresse for the regional elections in Île-de-France and took a “leave of absence” from the Democratic Movement (MoDem), without however leaving it, judging it to be “locked into a position of systematic opposition.”

On January 21, 2011, Gérard Larcher, President of the Senate, appointed him to the Conseil supérieur de l'audiovisuel (CSA), which automatically terminated his elected terms of office on January 23, the date on which the appointment took effect. His deputy, Roselle Cros, succeeded him in the Senate.

The main avenue in Montigny-le-Bretonneux is named after him.
