= Jean Miguères =

French ufologist (1940–1992)

- Miguères, pictured in a TV interview in 1978
- Born: Jean-Richard Miguères; May 11, 1940; Algiers, French Algeria
- Died: July 28, 1992 (aged 52); Lyon, France
- Cause of death: Gunshot wounds
- Citizenship: French
- Organization: CEIRUS
- Spouse: Odile Dorysse (m. 1992)
- Children: 2
- Website: www.jean-migueres.com

Jean-Richard Miguères (11 May 1940 – 28 July 1992) was a French UFO contactee and ufologist. He wrote several books putting forth a narrative of having been visited by extraterrestrials after a car accident in 1969. Miguères was a controversial figure even among other ufologists, who criticized him for illogical and inconsistent claims, and accused him of forging documents. His message greatly shifted over time, with his earlier books focusing more on proving his claims through medical and psychological records, and his third and final book establishing a basically religious message.

He was the founder of the UFO religious organization CEIRUS, though Miguères insisted that CEIRUS was not a religion. It was deemed a cult by the anti-cult group ADFI, and in 1992, Miguères was killed by his father-in-law, a member of AFDI, who believed he was a cult leader. Miguères was a friend of Raël, the creator of Raëlism; after his death, Raël and his followers protested the actions of AFDI.

== Early life ==
Jean-Richard Miguères was born 11 May 1940 in Algiers, in French Algeria. He had a younger brother, Alain. Miguères underwent no formal education, and served for the last two years of the Algerian War. According to his books, in his youth he was a moderately successful motocross racer; he said of himself that at this point he had little interest in UFOs. According to his narrative, he moved to Paris, becoming a train guard for the RATP Group for several years. He afterwards moved to Perpignan. His first wife was a nurse named Odile (Note: Odile is apparently the first name of both his first and second wife.) with whom he had two children. Odile later divorced him. Miguères got a diploma in first aid and became, according to his telling of events, a private ambulance driver, from which he experienced some success.

== UFO claims ==
Miguères was one of the most famous contactees in France. Miguères claimed that, in 1969 while working as a paramedic, he had crashed an ambulance, and right before it had crashed he had been contacted by extraterrestrials. After the crash, a strange entity appeared to him and after speaking to him placed a small disc on his neck that healed his body. Afterwards at the hospital, he was pronounced dead, before the aliens appeared and revived him. When in hospital again in 1970, he said he received more alien messages. In 1971 he contacted ufologist Guy Tarade after reading his book Soucoupes volantes et civilisations d’outre espace (transl. Flying Saucers and Outer Space Civilizations). In an unrelated incident in 1973, he claimed to the French media that there were actually 10 planets in the Solar System, resulting in widespread mockery from astrophysicists. That year, he joined Tarade's CEREIC (French: Centre d'Etude et de Recherches d'Elements inconnus de la Civilisation, lit. 'Center for the Study and Research of Unknown Elements of Civilization') and became its vice president in 1975, befriending other ufologists.

He published three books putting forth this narrative. His first two books were published by the paranormal-focused publisher Alain Lefeuvre, a reporter for L’Espoir Hebdo who wrote a paper on him, who launched his publishing with Miguères' initial book. The first was in 1977, J'ai été le cobaye des extraterrestres (transl. I Was the Guinea Pig of the Extraterrestrials). The book was also sold in French Canada, where Miguères gave lectures promoting his books. He was interviewed by Richard Glenn, a Canadian TV presenter and esotericist. The veracity of Miguères' claims was the subject of wide debate among ufologists in the late 1970s and 1980s; many viewed it as a hoax, but others thought he was genuine. Unlike other members of the contactee movement, who largely did not try to convince outside other believers, he tried to get scientific support for his claims and claimed that he could prove his claims with actual evidence. He initially did this through his medical records, later through claimed astronomical details that he said aliens communicated to him. The book contains alleged medical documents and psychiatric evaluations which deem him sane, as well as pictures and magazine articles. The first half of the book is focused on his initial experience with the events and the visitation, and the second half focuses on the 1970 messages from the second visit.

In July 1979, the French ufology group AESV (French: Association d'Études sur les Soucoupes Volantes, lit. 'Association for the Study of Flying Saucers') dedicated an entire special issue of their bulletin to him, which contained an examination of his claims and book, which was signed by the director Perry Petrakis. The AESV criticized him for illogical and inconsistent claims, with the precise locations and times being inaccurate (e.g. he claimed the existence of a route between Nice and Marseille that did not exist), and criticized the narrative as illogical (namely that the aliens he said he had encountered needed computers despite being telepathic). They also questioned his alleged professional background and insinuated many of the documents in the book were forgeries. Miguères later obtained an apology from Petrakis in the next issue through a legal representative, who admitted their investigation had some mistakes but refused to withdraw it in its entirety. A second book was published in 1979, Le cobaye des extra-terrestres face au scientifiques (transl. The Extraterrestrials' Guinea Pig Confronts the Scientists).

== CEIRUS ==
Miguères was a friend of Raël, the leader and founder of Raëlism. Unlike Raël, who was an atheist, Miguères considered himself to be Catholic and attended Mass. This was done in a contradictory manner; he both criticized religion and presented himself as a devoted Catholic.

In 1987, Miguères founded the religious movement CEIRUS (French: Centre européen d'initiation à la recherche ufologique à caractère scientifique, lit. 'European Center for the Initiation of Scientific Ufological Research') based in Lyon. One of CEIRUS's goals is to prepare for the arrival of aliens. That year, he published a third book, 1996: la révélation (transl. 1996: The Revelation). His third book had a great departure in tone from the first two; unlike the prior books that claimed to be able to back up his claims with evidence, it was basically religious in nature and made no mention of proof, instead arguing that one had to look inside for the answer. This book had a lesser distribution.

Miguères insisted that CEIRUS was not a religion, and wrote that the aliens' interventions on man had been misinterpreted to create "sects and religions", which were considered to be "primitive conceptions. He wrote of it that it was a "fantastic spiritual movement, which shall neither be a sect, nor a new religion, but rather simply a live force at the service of the 'light'". CEIRUS was deemed a cult by the anti-cult group ADFI and Miguères was designated a cult leader. In Spring 1992, he met 32-year-old Odile Dorysse, who had been attending CEIRUS meetings for several months. They married 4 July 1992. Dorysse had a daughter from a previous marriage, and after they married she broke off contact with her parents.

== Death ==
Miguères was killed by his father-in-law Roger Dorysse in Lyon, France on 28 July 1992. Dorysse was a 62-year-old retiree, and also a member (as was his wife) of the anti-cult group ADFI. AFDI classified CEIRUS as a cult and Miguères as a cult leader. Dorysse disliked Miguères's beliefs and activities, and was made aware of them through the AFDI. He had previously sued for custody of his granddaughter, but lost the case. He heard a rumor that Miguères was going to move to either Canada or South America, with Dorysse's daughter and granddaughter. Viewing him as a cult leader, he decided to kill him.

On 28 July, Dorysse waited near Miguères's car at the Boulevard de la Croix-Rousse in Lyon. When Miguères arrived, Dorysse shot him in the legs with a 22-caliber rifle. He then shot and killed him at close range. Dorysse later turned himself in to the police. He was largely portrayed sympathetically by the media; he received six years in prison and was released after three. His wife later told the press that "my husband is very sorry for his act, but he is totally at peace because he knows he acted for the best." After his death, Yvette Genosy, one of the presidents of AFDI, stressed Miguères' beliefs in trying to make sense of the killing. Dorysse died in 2015.

== Legacy ==
Following Miguères' death, Raël gave a speech in November 1992 at a Raëlian movement meeting in Montral, where he said that though he had disagreements with Miguères and his ideas he should have had a right to free speech, and requested donations for Miguères's widow (which she eventually refused). After his death, Raëlians collected signatures to protest against AFDI; Raël wrote a book in December of that year, Le Racisme religieux financé en France par le gouvernement Socialiste (transl. Religious racism sponsored in France by the Socialist government), in which he accused the UNAFDI of being itself a Catholic "fundamentalist cult" which organized "witch hunts" against "philosophical minorities", and criticized the government for funding it. The book is dedicated to Miguères. In October, in response to Miguères death, Raël founded FIREPHIM (French: Fédération internationale des religions et philosophies minoritaire, lit. 'International Federation of Minority Religions and Philosophies'), in what Raël called an attempt to "counterbalance the lies and perverse effects of ADFI". In the aftermath, the Church of Scientology also complained of the AFDI's role in his death.

Scholar Stefano Bigliardi said of Miguères that since, unlike Raël, Miguères' prophecies had an explicit end date of 1996, "if Miguères had normally lived on, the (likely) failure of those very prophecies might have quickly eroded his credibility." Pierre Lagrange said of his speech that it seemed to foreshadow later developments in conspiracy theory rhetoric, quoting Miguères's statement that "the levers of control on planet Earth are less and less in the hands of earthlings". He also noted that it was of "special interest" how his message had changed over time, going from emphasizing "scientific proof" to internal realization, which altered the debate with other ufologists as his message was "ever more elaborate, and who is not the same person/contactee from one book to the next". Lagrange said that when a skeptic read his books and noticed the contradictions, it would naturally seem to be a hoax or a sign of Miguères' mental unwellness, but that for Miguères the constantly shifting narrative was not just not a problem, but "what makes the transmission of the message possible".

== Publications ==
- —— (1977). J'ai été le cobaye des extra-terrestres (in French). Nice: Éditions Promazur.
- —— (1979). Le cobaye des extra-terrestres face aux scientifiques (in French). Nice: Alain Lefeuvre.
- —— (1987). 1996: la révélation (in French). Paris: Alliance.
