= Aaron Rhodes =

American human rights activist, university lecturer, and essayist

Aaron Anthony Rhodes (born 1949) is an international human rights activist and writer. He is a senior fellow at Common Sense Society and President of the Forum for Religious Freedom-Europe, an independent nongovernmental organization. Rhodes served as Executive Director of the International Helsinki Federation for Human Rights (IHF) between 1993 and 2007, during which period the IHF was engaged inter alia in human rights challenges in the Balkans, in Chechnya, and in Central Asia, and the organization expanded significantly. He has been active in civil society campaigns vis a vis the Human Dimension of the Organization for Security and Cooperation in Europe (OSCE), the Council of Europe, the European Union and the United Nations. He is based in Hamburg, Germany.

== Biography ==
Rhodes was born in rural Upstate New York, the son of Lillyan Estelle (née Jacobs) and Daniel Rhodes. Rhodes was educated at Reed College and in the Committee on Social Thought at the University of Chicago, where he was awarded a Ph.D. in 1980. After serving in political and governmental positions in Chicago and Illinois, he became Assistant to the President of Boston University, John Silber. He moved to Vienna in 1991 to work on projects for educational reform in Eastern Europe initiated by the Institute for Human Sciences (Institut für die Wissenschaften vom Menschen).

He has also been involved with human rights issues in a number of Middle Eastern countries. In 2008, after the closure of IHF due to an economic crime, he helped found and became Policy Adviser to the International Campaign for Human Rights in Iran, a project of the Netherlands-based NGO Bridging the Gulf-Foundation for Human Security in the Middle East. He has also undertaken human rights investigations in Cuba, Japan, Korea, Pakistan, Malaysia, Hong Kong, and elsewhere.

Rhodes was a co-founder of the Freedom Rights Project, a human rights research initiative and think-tank, which documents and analyzes trends including the inflation, dilution and politicization of human rights in international law. In 2019, he assumed the position of Human Rights Editor of Dissident Magazine, a project of the Victims of Communism Memorial Foundation.

In 2008, Rhodes was made an honorary citizen of Austria for his "contributions to the Republic." He was awarded a Public Service Citation by the University of Chicago in 2009. In 2020, Rhodes was honored by the Moscow Helsinki Group "For Historical Contributions to the Protection of Human Rights and the Human Rights Movement."

In 2018, Rhodes published a book, "The Debasement of Human Rights: How Politics Sabotage the Ideal of Freedom" (Encounter Books, New York). His articles have appeared in the Wall Street Journal, Newsweek, Die Zeit, The American Interest, National Review Online, and elsewhere.
