= Roger Ikor =

French writer (1912–1986)

- Occupation: Writer
- Writing career
- Genre: Non-fiction

Roger Ikor (28 May 1912 – 17 November 1986) was a French writer, winner of the Prix Goncourt in 1955. He was born in Paris.

== Life ==
Roger was of Jewish ancestry. He was a student and professor of literature at the Lycee Condorcet and the Lycée Pasteur in Neuilly-sur-Seine. In June 1940, he was taken prisoner of war, and was sent to Pomerania.

Les eaux mêlées (1955), which won the Goncourt Prize the same year, and which forms with The Spring Graft, a diptych titled Sons of Avrom, tells the story of a Jewish family that settled in France, and was bound by blood with a non-Jewish French family. Spanning three generations, the story describes the relationship the family developed with their new homeland.

One of Ikor's sons had joined a Zen cult, against his father's wishes, and committed suicide. In response, Ikor founded, in 1981, the Centre contre les manipulations mentales (also known as the Centre Roger-Ikor), whose aim was to protect individuals from religious cults.
