= Union nationale des associations de défense des familles et de l'individu =

French association

The Union nationale des associations de défense des familles et de l'individu (UNADFI) is a French anti-cult association founded in 1974, recognized as a public utility association by a decree of 30 April 1996, and directly subsidized by the French state. It gathers and coordinates the Associations de Défense des Familles et de l'Individu (ADFI), whose purpose is to acquire information on the cult phenomenon with prevention and assistance for its victims.

== Organization ==
UNADFI was founded in December 1974 by Claire and Guy Champollion, after their 18-year-old son had joined the Moon cult. The following year, other local associations (ADFI) were established, that later joined together to form a national union.

As 2026, UNADFI was composed of 29 ADFI associations. The association is currently member of the FECRIS, an international anti-cult organization.

Since 2001, the president of UNADFI is Gérard Fodor. He succeeded Janine Tavernier, who had been president since 1992, or Socialist deputy Catherine Picard.

Its role involves, in particular, relaying reports made by individuals regarding suspected undue influence by a cult-like group.

The association is sponsored by various ministries, including the Ministry of Youth Affairs and Sports and by social affairs, as well as by various communes and departments totaling €450,000 in 2002, over 80% of its budget.

UNADFI publishes a magazine named BULLES (French: Bulletin de liaison pour l'étude des sectes), a quarterly with in-depth articles and reports on key national and international developments regarding the phenomenon of cults.

== Criticism ==
The sociologist Bruno Étienne calls into question the neutrality of the framework used by UNADFI. As he writes in France and Cults (2002), the very terms "family" and "individual" are not necessarily neutral and may reflect an ideological stance. "The only beneficiary is a system which is clearly ideologically positioned", he believes.

Historian of religion Anne Morelli estimated in an open-letter published in 1997 that the methods of anti-cult groups are "the same everywhere: to discredit all the religious groups outside of the large classic religions and to seed disinformation about them. The 'cult of the anti-cult' squeezes the media and politics in particular, but doesn't neglect the university research sector either. In France two associations share this 'market', corresponding to the two fundamental options in French society: one is secular (the CCMM), and the other is catholic (The UNADFI)".

Since her resignation from the movement in 2002, former president Janine Tavernier has leveled criticisms towards Unadfi. She argues that "the association was founded by persons of Catholic faith, but open about it. I wanted to go towards more openness. Little by little a lot of Freemasons have entered the UNADFI, giving it a shade it hadn't had originally ..." and that "Today I worry when I hear the president of the UNADFI, Catherine Picard criticise without distinction at the reunion of 'evangelical churches'".

In 1992, Jean Miguères, who AFDI had declared a cult leader, was assassinated by his father-in-law, a member of the AFDI, which resulted in criticism.

=== Trials ===
In 2001, eleven members of the Church of Scientology sued the president of UNADFI, Janine Tavernier, for defamation. Their case was dismissed. Six months later, in separate proceedings, UNADFI was found guilty of defamation regarding an article published in tits newsletter.

== See also ==
- Cult
- New religious movement
