= Catherine Picard =

French politician (born 1952)

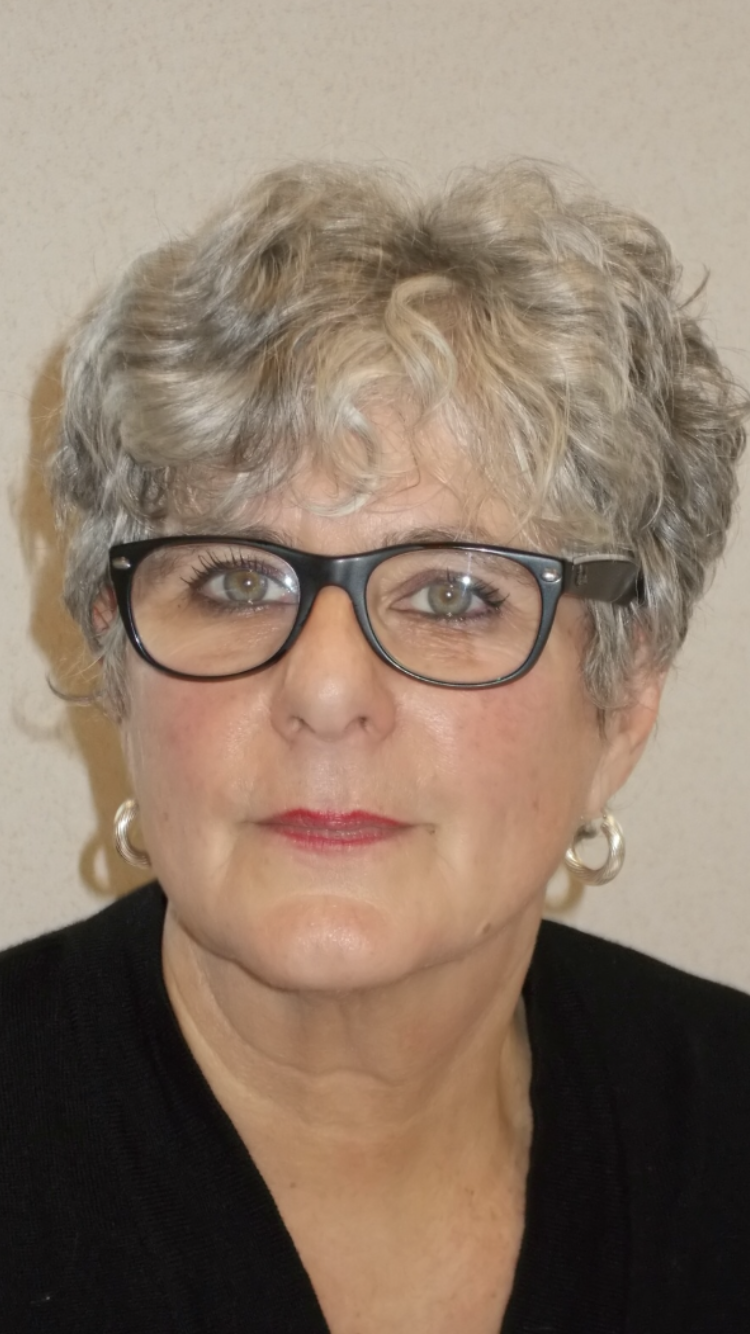
- Catherine Picard in 2018

Member of the National Assembly for Eure's 5th constituency
- In office 12 June 1997 – 19 June 2002
- Preceded by: Jean-Claude Asphe
- Succeeded by: Franck Gilard

Personal details
- Born: 14 August 1952 (age 73) La Garenne-Colombes, France
- Party: Socialist Party

Catherine Picard (born 14 August 1952) is a French politician and anti-cultist from the French Socialist Party. She was a member of the French National Assembly from 1997 to 2002.

== Career ==
Picard was elected on 1 June 1997 for the French Socialist Party and was responsible for public education. In 2001, together with centrist Senator Nicolas About, she drafted the About-Picard law.

In 2007, Picard was found guilty of slander against the Jehovah's Witnesses. In 2009, she became a Knight of the Legion of Honour.

== Published works ==
- Fournier, Anne; Picard, Catherine (2002). Sectes, démocratie et mondialisation. Paris: Presses universitaires de France. ISBN 978-2-13-052569-1.
