= Centre contre les manipulations mentales =

French anti-cult organization

- Formation: 1981; 45 years ago
- Founder: Roger Ikor
- Location: France
- Website: ccmm.asso.fr

The Centre contre les manipulations mentales or Centre Roger Ikor, widely abbreviated CCMM, is a French anti-cult association.

== History ==
The association was founded in 1981 by the writer Roger Ikor, winner of the Prix Goncourt in 1955, after the suicide of his son, a follower of Zen macrobiotics.

The CCMM was chaired from 1997 to 1998 by Alain Vivien. Before resigning to become president of the Interministerial Mission for the Fight against Sects (MILS), he hired his wife Patricia as executive director. Patricia Vivien had an important role in the CCMM, and eventually was said to have more power than the president.

== Criticism ==
The writings of CCMM are a source of information for organizations such as MIVILUDES. The CCMM was sometimes criticized, notably because of financial disclosure and the important role of Patricia Vivien when Alain Vivien was president of MIVILUDES, which led to collusion between the two associations.

Priest Jean Vernette criticized the association for the publication of its book entitled Dictionnaire des sectes which contains a list of cults, including some Roman Catholic groups.
