= Alain Vivien =

French politician

Mayor
- In office 1977–1983
- Constituency: Combs-la-Ville

Secretary of State
- In office 1991–1992
- Constituency: France

Chairman, MILS
- In office 1998–2002

Personal details
- Born: August 20, 1938 (age 87) Melun, France
- Party: French Socialist Party

Alain Vivien (born August 20, 1938) is a French Socialist Party (PS) politician, best known for chairing (1998–2002) the French Mission Interministérielle pour la Lutte contre les Sectes, MILS, a ministerial organization designed to observe the activities of various religious organizations defined as "Sectes" (cults).

== Early career ==
He was mayor of Combs-la-Ville in 1977–1983 and 1989–1992. In 1983 he was elected to the French National Assembly for Seine-et-Marne as a PS candidate. The author of a report on cults requested by Prime Minister Pierre Mauroy in 1982, he was Secretary of State under Édith Cresson in 1991–1992. From 1997 to 1998 he was president of the Centre contre les manipulations mentales.

== Awards ==
- Leipzig Human Rights Award, May 11, 2002

== See also ==
- About-Picard law
- Status of religious freedom in France
- List of anti-cult organizations and individuals
