= MIVILUDES =

French state agency that monitors cults

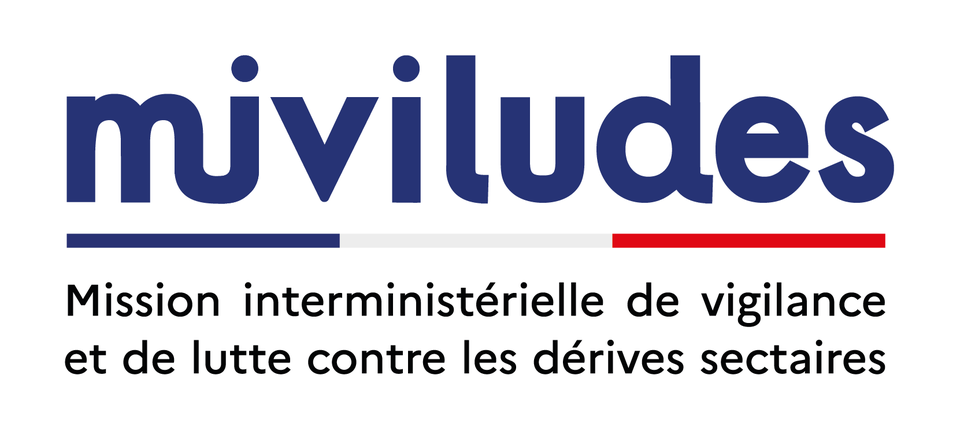

Agency overview
- Formed: 2002; 23 years ago
- Headquarters: France
- Website: miviludes.interieur.gouv.fr

The Interministerial Mission for Vigilance and Action Against Sectarian Aberrations (Mission interministérielle de vigilance et de lutte contre les dérives sectaires, MIVILUDES) is a French government agency created by presidential decree in 2002. It is charged with observing and analyzing the phenomenon of cult movements, coordinating the government response, informing the public about the risks arising from sectarian aberrations, and facilitating the implementation of actions to aid the victims.

== Functions ==
According to the first article of the Decree Number 2002–1392 of 28 November 2002, the MIVILUDES is charged with:

1. Observing and analyzing the phenomenon of sectarian movements whose practices are prejudicial to human rights and basic liberties, constitute a menace to public order, or are in conflict with existing laws and regulations;
2. Favouring, in the respect of public liberties, the coordination of preventive and repressive action by the authorities against such practices;
3. Developing the exchange of information between public services on administrative practices relating to the combat against sectarian aberrations;
4. Contributing to the informing and training of public agents in this area;
5. Informing the public about the risks and, in some cases, the dangers, arising from sectarian aberrations, and facilitating the implementation of actions to aid the victims of such practices;
6. Participating in activities relating to issues falling within its scope undertaken at the international level by the ministry of foreign affairs.

MIVILUDES provides information related to "cultic aberrations" to the media, the French government, and individual members of the public. It recommends contacts and other organizations, and produces and archives documentation and discussion papers on groups considered cults.

== History ==
=== Background ===
The French authorities created MIVILUDES as the successor to MILS (Mission interministérielle de lutte contre les sectes; English: "Interministerial Mission for Action Against Cults"), which itself functioned from 7 October 1998 as the successor to the Observatoire interministériel sur les sectes (English: Interministerial Observatory on Cults) established on 9 May 1996. These organizations were in charge of coordinating government monitoring of cults.

In February 1998, MILS, headed by Alain Vivien, released its annual report on their monitoring of cults in France. The operations of MILS, and Vivien's background as the head of an anti-cult organization (he had served as President of the Centre Roger Ikor from 1997 to 1998), had occasionally received criticism from several human-rights organizations, such as the International Helsinki Federation for Human Rights, as well as the United States Commission on International Religious Freedom, a U.S. government agency. In January 1999, Vivien requested and received police protection following threats and the burglary of his home. Vivien resigned in June 2002 under criticism.

=== MIVILUDES ===
The MIVILUDES was created by a decree of President Jacques Chirac on 28 November 2002. Jean-Louis Langlais, a senior civil servant at the Ministry of the Interior, served as its president from 2002 to 2005. Announcing the formation of MIVILUDES, the French government acknowledged the criticism that MILS had received from outside France for certain activities that could be considered in violation of religious freedom. Then this decree repealed the decree of 7 October 1998 establishing MILS.

In an interview in March 2003, Langlais categorized the fight as not against "sects" but against "sectarian aberrations". He stated that, since current French law lacks a definition for a "sect", "the law cannot define sectarian aberrations". Nevertheless, he portrayed the role of MIVILUDES as contributing to "defining what could simply be an administrative jurisprudence".

A 2004 report by the United States Commission on International Religious Freedom concluded with an assessment that the restructuring of the main French agency concerned with this issue – referring to MILS being replaced by MIVILUDES – had improved religious freedoms in France.

The prefect Jean-Michel Roulet became president of MIVILUDES in October 2005, followed by the judge Georges Fenech in October 2008 and the physician Serge Blisko in August 2012.

== Publications ==
Each year, the MIVILUDES published a report on its activities and a thematic study. Some of them were translated into English:

- Annual Report 2003
- Annual Report 2004
- Annual Report 2007
- Annual Report 2008

== See also ==
- Cult
- Cult Information Centre
- Decult Conference
- European Federation of Centres of Research and Information on Sectarianism
- New religious movement
- Parliamentary Commission on Cults in France
- Status of religious freedom in France
