= Religion in France =

Religious affiliation in 2025 (excluding overseas territories)
1. Catholicism (43.0%)
2. Protestantism (4.0%)
3. Orthodoxy (1.0%)
4. No religion (37.5%)
5. Islam (7.0%)
6. Judaism (1.0%)
7. Buddhism (1.0%)
8. Others (2.5%)
9. Unspecified (3.0%)

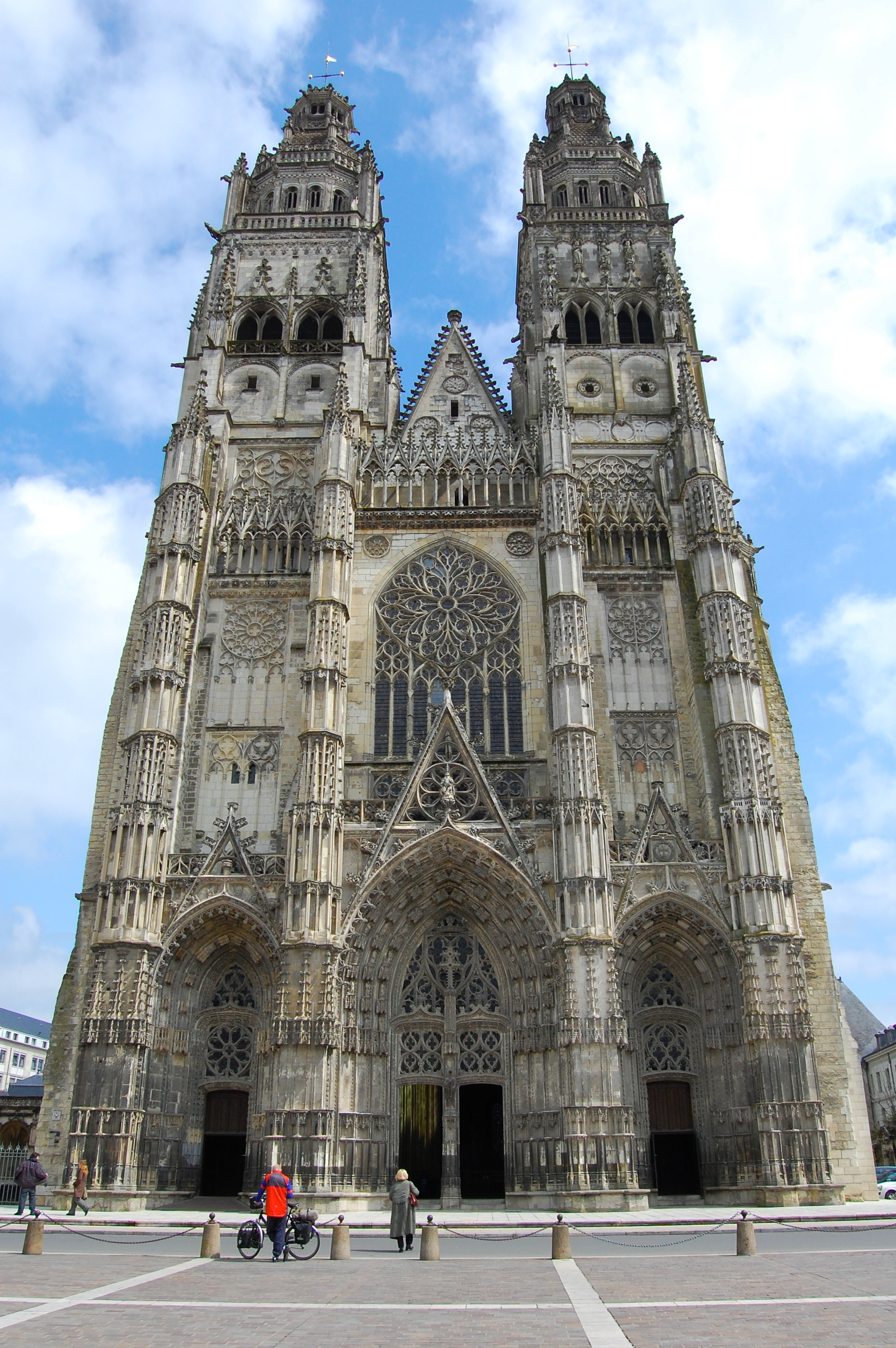
St. Gatianus' Cathedral in Tours

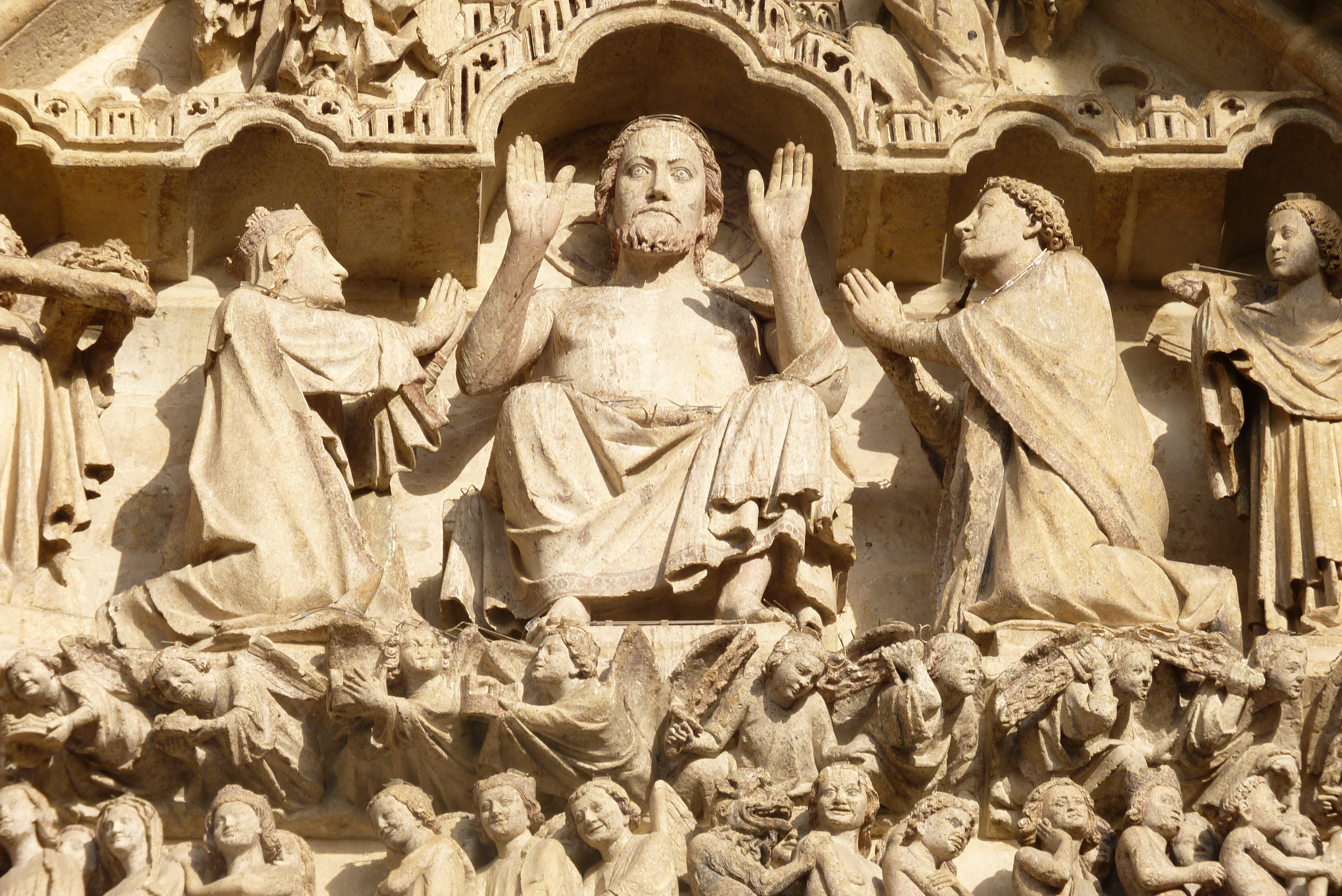
A relief depicting the final judgement of sinners by Jesus at Amiens Cathedral, a World Heritage Site

Religion in France is diverse, with the largest religious group being Christianity. A very significant part of the population is not religious, and significant minorities profess Islam and other religions.

Freedom of religion and freedom of thought are warranted by the legacy of the 1789 Declaration of the Rights of Man and of the Citizen, and by the principle of laïcité (or "freedom of conscience") enforced by the 1880s Jules Ferry laws and the 1905 law on the Separation of the Churches and the State. Catholicism was the major religion in the realm of the French monarchy for more than a millennium, and it also held the role of state religion; the monarchy had such close ties to the Roman papacy that France was called the "eldest daughter of the Church" (French: fille aînée de l'Église).

== Demographics ==
=== Census and official statistics, 1851–2020 ===
A series of censuses throughout the 19th century included a question on the religious affiliation of the respondents, with the results depicted in the table below.

	Census					
Religion	1851		1861		1866	
Religion	Number	%	Number	%	Number	%
Christianity	35,679,364	99.7	37,293,230	99.8	37,953,831	99.8
—Catholicism	34,931,032	97.6	36,490,891	97.6	37,107,212	97.5
—Other Christianity	748,332	2.1	802,339	2.2	846,619	2.3
——Calvinism	480,507	1.3	480,436	1.3	515,759	1.4
——Lutheranism	267,525	0.7	281,642	0.8	286,506	0.8
——Other Protestants and Christians	–	–	40,261	0.1	44,354	0.1
Judaism	73,965	0.2	79,964	0.2	89,047	0.2
Other religions	26,348	0.1	1,295	0.003	1,400	0.004
No religion	3,483	0.01	11,824	0.03	22,786	0.1
Total population	35,783,170		37,386,313		38,067,064	

More recently, there has been a series of sample surveys used to determine the religious composition of the population, with the most official ones carried out by the Eurostat, the statistical agency of the European Union, and the government of France. A summary of the statistics is included in the table below. The most recent estimates show a growing percentage of people unaffiliated with an organized religion, particularly with the youngest demographics, while Christianity remains the most followed religion. (Note: The 2020 survey of religion by INSEE was conducted on a nationally representative large sample (≈ 28,000) of people aged 18–49 and 18–59. It is reputed to be representative of the whole population of Metropolitan France, comprising French people without immigrant background, French people with immigrant background since various generations, as well as first-generation immigrant citizens.)

According to a national ten-year survey of 2020 held by the National Institute of Statistics and Economic Studies (INSEE), 34% of the French population between the age of 18 and 49 (and thus excluding the youngest and oldest demographics) adhered to Christianity, of whom approximately 25% were Catholics and 9% other Christians (without further specification; it may include nondenominational Christianity as well as various branches of Protestantism, Eastern Christianity, and other denominations of the religion); at the same time, 11% of the French population adhered to Islam, 0.5% to Buddhism, 0.5% to Judaism, and smaller negligible fractions to other religions (Hinduism and Sikhism, amongst others). At the same time, 53% of the sample declared that they had no religion. Between 2010 and 2020, the INSEE recorded a decline of Catholicism for the same demographics (between 18 and 49 years of age) from 43% to 25%, a growth of nondenominational and other denominations of Christianity from 2.5% to 9%, a growth of Islam from 8% to 11%, and of non-religious people from 45% to 53%, while the proportion of other religions remained stable.

Surveys on religious affiliation of the French population
	Government data	Eurobarometer	INSEE (ages 18–49)	
Religion	2020	2021	2009	2020
Christianity	50	46	45.5	34.0
—Catholicism	47	42	43.0	25.0
—Protestantism	2	1	2.5	9.0
—Other Christianity	1	3	2.5	9.0
Islam	4	5	8.0	11.0
Judaism	1	-	0.5	0.5
Buddhism	2	1	0.5	0.5
Other religions	1	6	0.5	1.0
No religion	33	42	45.0	53.0

=== Religion by ethnic origins ===
Religion by ethnic origins in France (in percentage), 2020 national survey
Ethnic origins	Christianity	Catholicism	Other Christians	Islam	Judaism	Buddhism	Other religion	No religion
French without immigrant origins	40	32	8	1	0	0	0	58
French with immigrant origins
First-generation immigrants	32	15	17	44	0	2	1	21
French-born with immigrant background	27	8	19	32	1	1	1	39
Overseas French native origins
First-generation overseas French natives	56	38	18	10	0	1	1	33
Overseas French native background	51	33	18	2	0	0	1	46
Algerian origins
First-generation Algerians	0	0	0	89	0	0	0	11
Algerian background	4	3	1	64	0	0	0	32
Moroccan and Tunisian origins
First-generation Moroccans and Tunisians	0	0	0	89	1	0	0	9
Moroccan and Tunisian background	5	3	2	65	4	0	0	25
Sahelian African origins
First-generation Sahelian Africans	10	7	3	84	0	0	0	5
Sahelian African background	8	5	3	77	0	0	0	14
Gulf of Guinea and Central African origins
First-generation Gulf of Guinea and Central Africans	77	34	43	9	0	0	1	13
Gulf of Guinea and Central African background	57	14	43	14	0	0	0	29
Other African origins
First-generation other Africans	49	20	29	38	0	1	0	12
Other African background	35	20	15	31	0	0	1	33
Turkish and Middle Eastern origins
First-generation Turks and Middle Easterners	14	5	9	72	0	0	0	13
Turkish and Middle Eastern background	10	4	6	67	2	0	0	20
Southeast Asian origins
First-generation Southeast Asians	14	11	3	1	0	35	2	48
Southeast Asian background	8	5	3	1	0	23	1	66
Chinese origins
First-generation Chinese or Chinese background*	7	2	5	0	0	21	0	71
Other Asian origins
First-generation other Asians	20	12	8	26	0	13	16	24
Other Asian background	20	8	12	19	0	0	23	38
Portuguese origins
First-generation Portuguese	79	67	12	0	0	0	0	21
Portuguese background	56	40	16	0	0	0	0	43
Spanish and Italian origins
First-generation Spaniards and Italians	47	40	7	8	2	1	0	42
Spanish and Italian background	45	38	7	1	0	0	0	54
Other European origins
First-generation other Europeans	58	27	31	3	0	0	0	38
Other European background	45	35	10	1	0	0	0	53
Total French population**	38	29	9	10	0	1	1	51
Highlights in each ethnic category (horizontal row) indicate the respective largest and second-largest religious category (vertical row). *The surveyors were unable to distinguish first-generation Chinese immigrants and French people with Chinese background from past generations. **The results from the total population in this table are different from those in the table above because the surveyors calculated them on slightly different age cohorts.

== History ==
France guarantees freedom of religion as a constitutional right, and the government generally respects this right in practice. Because of a long history of anticlericalism, the state cut its institutional ties with the Catholic Church in 1905 and made a strong promise to keep the public sector free of religion.

=== Catholicism as a state religion ===
Catholicism is the largest religion in France. During the pre-1789 Ancien Régime, France was traditionally considered the Church's eldest daughter, and the King of France always maintained close links to the Pope. However, the "Gallicanism" policy meant that the king selected bishops.

==== French Wars of Religion (1562–1598) ====
A strong Protestant population resided in France, primarily of Reformed confession. The government usually opposed this but at times, tolerated more. This suppression continued throughout the 16th century, culminating in the St. Bartholomew's Day massacre, until the 1598 Edict of Nantes issued by Henry IV.

For the first time, the state considered Huguenots something other than mere heretics. The Edict of Nantes thus opened a path for secularism and tolerance. In addition to offering general freedom of conscience to subjects, the edict offered many specific concessions to the Huguenots, including amnesty and the reinstatement of their civil rights, the right to work for the state or in any field, and to bring grievances directly to the king.

==== Post–Edict of Nantes (1598–1789) ====
Protestantism in 16th-century France Controlled by Huguenot nobility Contested between Huguenots and Catholics Controlled by Catholic nobility Lutheran-majority area (part of the HRE)

The 1598 Edict also granted the Protestants places of safety (places de sûreté), military strongholds such as La Rochelle (for which the king paid 180,000 écus a year), along with a further 150 emergency forts (places de refuge), to be maintained at the Huguenots' own expense. Such an innovative act of toleration stood virtually alone in a Europe (except for the Polish–Lithuanian Commonwealth) where standard practice forced the subjects of a ruler to follow whatever religion that the ruler formally adopted – the application of the principle of cuius regio, eius religio.

Religious conflicts resumed at the end of the 17th century, when Louis XIV, the "Sun King," initiated the persecution of Huguenots by introducing the dragonnades in 1681. This wave of violence intimidated the Protestants into converting to Catholicism. He made the policy official with the 1685 revocation of the Edict of Nantes. As a result, a large number of Protestants—estimates range from 200,000 to 500,000—left France during the following two decades, seeking asylum in England, the United Provinces, Denmark, the Protestant states of the Holy Roman Empire (Hesse, Brandenburg-Prussia, etc.), and in European colonies in North America and South Africa.

The revocation returned France to a state of affairs similar to that of virtually every other European country of the period, in which only the state religion was tolerated. Europe's experiment with religious tolerance was effectively over for the time being. In practice, the revocation caused France to suffer a brain drain, as it lost a large number of skilled craftsmen, including key designers such as Daniel Marot.

=== French Revolution ===
The French Revolution stripped the Catholic Church of most of its wealth, power, and influence. The early revolutionaries sought to secularize all of French society, an effort inspired in part by the writings and philosophy of Voltaire. In August 1789, the new National Assembly abolished tithes, the mandatory 10% income tax which all Frenchmen (including non-Catholics) paid to the Catholic Church. In November 1789, they voted to expropriate the vast wealth of the Church in endowments, lands and buildings. In 1790, the Assembly abolished monastic religious orders. Statues and saints were rejected in a burst of iconoclasm, and most religious instruction ended.

The Civil Constitution of the Clergy of 1790 put the Catholic Church under state control. It upended the traditional authority of the Church by requiring priests and bishops to be elected by their parishioners. The Republic legalized divorce and transferred birth, death, and marriage registrations to the state. The Catholic clergy was persecuted by the Paris Commune of 1792 to 1795 and by some of the Représentants en mission. Most notably, Jean-Baptiste Carrier conducted large-scale drownings of priests and nuns in the river Loire.

In 1793, the government established a secular Republican Calendar. Church tradition had set aside every Sunday, together with many saint's days and other religious holidays, as days for celebration and relaxation but the government tried to end all that and to increase the total number of working days. It instituted a 10-day week, allowing one day in 10 for relaxation. Workers and peasants felt cheated and overworked. The new system disrupted daily routines and ended cherished celebrations. When the reformers were overthrown or executed, their radical new calendar was quickly abandoned.

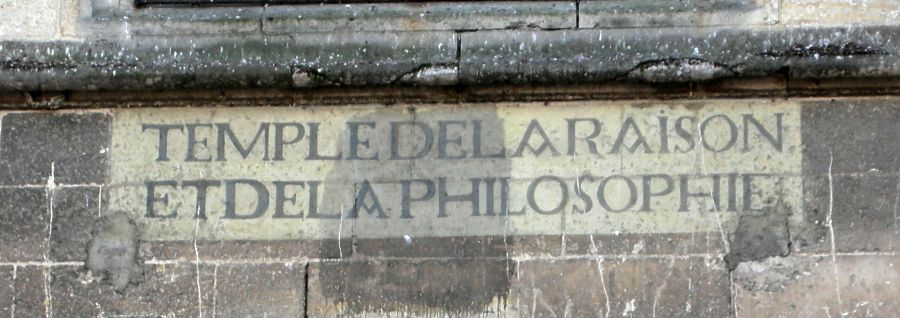
Many Catholic churches were turned into Temples of Reason during the Revolution, as recalled by this inscription on a church in Ivry-la-Bataille.

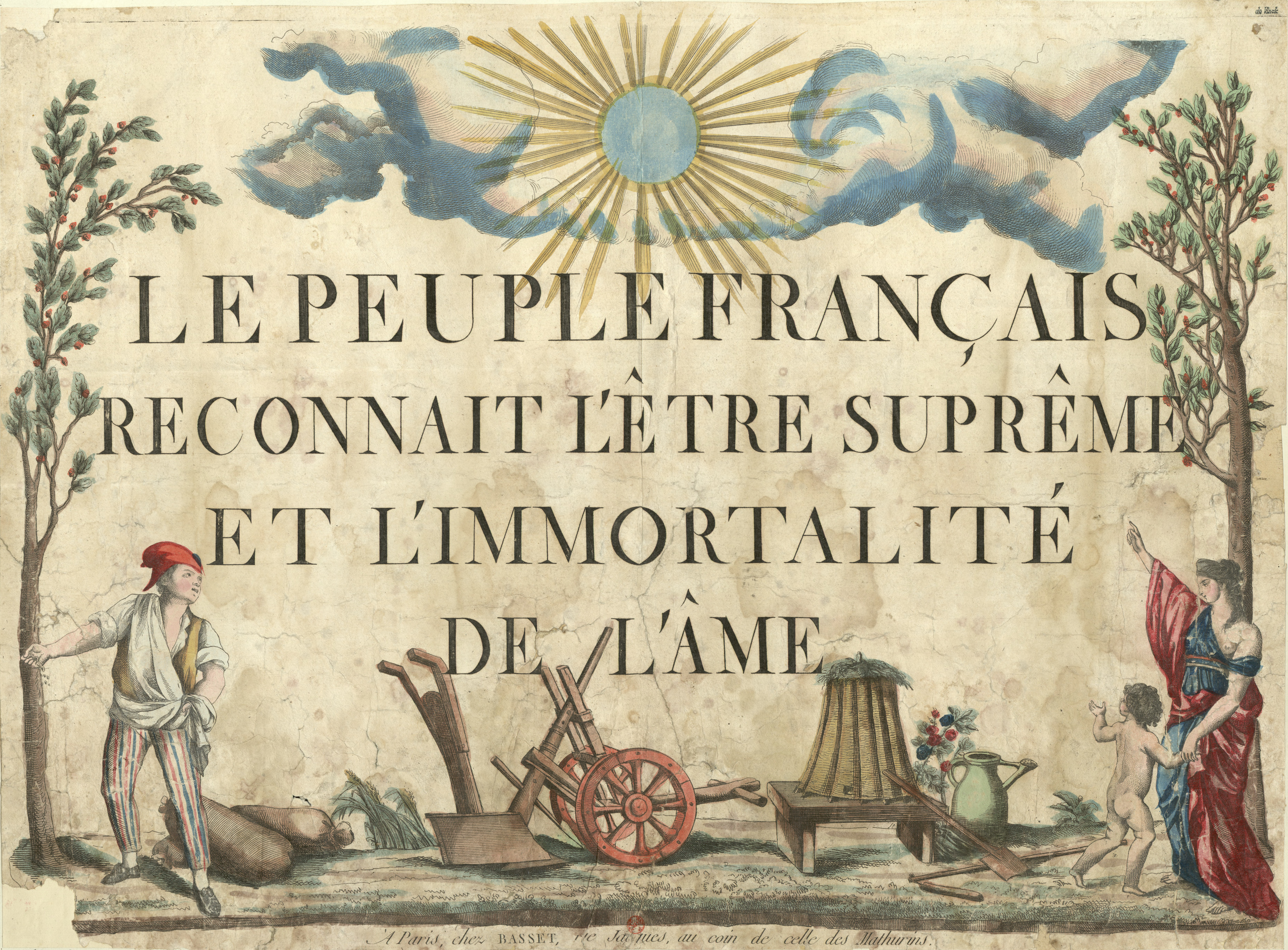
Standard of the deistic Cult of the Supreme Being, one of the proposed state religions to replace Christianity in revolutionary France

Religious minorities—Protestants and Jews—were granted full civil and political rights, which represented a shift towards a more secular government to some, and an attack on the Catholic Church to others. New religions and philosophies were allowed to compete with Catholicism. The introduction of the prominent cults during the revolutionary period – the Cult of Reason and the Cult of the Supreme Being – responded to the belief that religion and politics should be seamlessly fused together. This is a shift from the original Enlightenment ideals of the Revolution that advocated for a secular government with tolerance for various religious beliefs. While Maximilien Robespierre favored a religious foundation to the Republic, he maintained a hard stance against Catholicism because of its association with corruption and the counterrevolution.

The cults sought to erase the old ways of religion by closing churches, confiscating church bells, and implementing a new Republican Calendar that excluded any days for religious practice. Many churches were converted into Temples of Reason. The Cult of Reason was first to de-emphasize the existence of God, and instead focus on deism, featuring not the sacred, divine, nor eternal, but the natural, earthy, and temporal existence. To tie the church and the state together, the cults transformed traditional religious ideology into politics. The Cult of the Supreme Being used religion as political leverage. Robespierre accused political opponents of hiding behind God and using religion to justify their oppositional stance against the Revolution. It was a shift in ideology that allowed for the cult to use the new deistic beliefs for political momentum.

Following the Thermidorian Reaction the persecutions of Catholic clergy ceased and the role of new cults practically ended.

=== Napoleon and concordat with the Vatican ===
The Catholic Church was badly hurt by the Revolution. By 1800 it was poor, dilapidated and disorganized, with a depleted and aging clergy. The younger generation had received little religious instruction, and was unfamiliar with traditional worship. However, in response to the external pressures of foreign wars, religious fervor was strong, especially among women.

Napoleon, who took control in a coup by 1800, decided that religious divisiveness had to be minimized to unite France. The Concordat of 1801 was an agreement between Napoleon and Pope Pius VII, signed in July 1801 that remained in effect until 1905. It sought national reconciliation between revolutionaries and Catholics and solidified the Roman Catholic Church as the majority church of France, with most of its civil status restored. The hostility of devout Catholics against the state had then largely been resolved. It did not restore the vast church lands and endowments that had been seized upon during the revolution and sold off. Catholic clergy returned from exile, or from hiding, and resumed their traditional positions in their traditional churches. Very few parishes continued to employ the priests who had accepted the Civil Constitution of the Clergy of the Revolutionary regime. While the Concordat restored much power to the papacy, the balance of church-state relations tilted firmly in Napoleon's favour. He selected the bishops and supervised church finances.

=== Bourbon Restoration (1814–1830) ===
The Bourbon Restoration made the Catholic Church again the state religion of France. Other religions were tolerated, but Catholicism was favored both financially and politically. Its lands and financial endowments were not returned, but the government now paid salaries and maintenance costs for church activities. The bishops had regained control of Catholic affairs and of education. While the aristocracy before the Revolution did not place a high priority on religious doctrine or practice, the decades of exile created an alliance of throne and altar. The royalists who returned were much more devout, and much more aware of their need for a close alliance with the Church. They had discarded skepticism and now promoted the wave of Catholic religiosity that was sweeping Europe, with a new regard to the Virgin Mary, the Saints, and popular religious rituals such as saying the rosary. Devotionalism was far stronger in rural areas, and much less noticeable in Paris and the other cities. The population of 32 million included about 680,000 Protestants, and 60,000 Jews. They were tolerated. Anti-clericalism of the sort promoted by the Enlightenment and writers such as Voltaire had not disappeared, but it was in recession and repressed by the ultra-conservative Bourbon government.

At the elite level, the intellectual climate changed dramatically from the intellectually oriented classicism to emotionally based romanticism. A book by François-René de Chateaubriand entitled Génie du christianisme ("The Genius of Christianity") (1802) had an enormous influence in reshaping French literature and intellectual life. It emphasized the power of religion in creating European high culture. Chateaubriand's book did more than any other single work to restore the credibility and prestige of Christianity in intellectual circles and launched a fashionable rediscovery of the Middle Ages and their Christian civilisation. The revival was by no means confined to an intellectual elite, however, but was evident in the real, if uneven, rechristianisation of the French countryside.

=== Napoleon III (1848–1870) ===
Napoleon III strongly supported Catholic interests, financing the church and supporting Catholic missionaries in the emerging French Empire. His primary goal was the conciliation of religious and anti-religious interests in France to avoid the conflicts that took place during the revolution and that reappeared after he lost power.

In terms of foreign policy, the French army stopped the anti-clerical Kingdom of Italy from taking full control of Rome after it was formed in 1860 and took over parts of the papal states. In Paris, the conservative Gallican bishops helped the Emperor control the French people, while liberal Catholic intellectuals wanted to use the Church as an instrument of reform. A problem arose with Pope Pius IX, who reigned from 1846 to 1878. He started out as a liberal but suddenly, in the 1860s, became the leading champion of reactionary politics in Europe, in opposition to all forms of modern liberalism. He demanded complete control for the church over its religious and educational affairs and had the First Vatican Council (1869–70) decree papal infallibility. Napoleon III's foreign policy was too tightly tied to Rome's support for him to break with the Pope, but his close relationship with the Pope considerably weakened him domestically. In 1870 he had to bring his army home when he declared war on Prussia, and the kingdom of Italy promptly swallowed up the papal states, and the Pope's secular power shrunk to just the Vatican. The Vatican upset both liberal and conservative Catholics in France when it spoke out against progress, industrialization, capitalism, socialism, and almost every new idea. It also energized secular liberals, including many professionals, and the anti-clerical socialist movement. They stepped up their attacks on church control of schools.

=== Third Republic (1870–1940) ===
Throughout its lifetime, the Third Republic (1870–1940) saw battles over the status of the Catholic Church in France between the republicans and the monarchists and other authoritarians (such as the Napoleonists). The French Catholic clergy and bishops were closely associated with the monarchists, and its higher hierarchy was largely drawn from noble families. The republicans' power base was the anti-clerical middle class, which saw the Church's alliance with the monarchists as both a political threat to the republic and a threat to the modern spirit of progress. The republicans detested the Church for its political and class affiliations; for them, the Church represented the Ancien Régime, a time in French history most republicans hoped was long behind them. The Republicans were strengthened by Protestant and Jewish support. Numerous laws successively weakened the Catholic Church. In 1879, priests were excluded from the administrative committees of hospitals and boards of charity; in 1880, new measures were directed against the religious congregations; from 1880 to 1890, lay women replaced nuns in many hospitals; and in 1882, the Ferry school laws were passed. Napoleon's Concordat of 1801 continued to ensure state funding of the church, but in 1881, the government cut off salaries to priests, which it disliked.

Republicans feared that religious orders in control of schools—especially the Jesuits and Assumptionists—indoctrinated anti-republicanism into children. Determined to root this out, republicans insisted the state needed control of the schools for France to achieve economic and militaristic progress. (Republicans felt one of the primary reasons for the German victory in 1870 was their superior education system.)

The early anti-Catholic laws were largely the work of republican Jules Ferry in 1882. Religious instruction was pushed out of all schools, and religious orders were forbidden to teach in them. Funds were appropriated from religious schools to build more state schools. Later in the century, other laws passed by Ferry's successors further weakened the Church's position in French society. Civil marriage became the only legal one, divorce was introduced, and chaplains were removed from the army.

When Leo XIII became pope in 1878, he tried to calm Church-State relations. In 1884, he told French bishops not to act in a hostile manner toward the State ('Nobilissima Gallorum Gens'). In 1892, he issued an encyclical advising French Catholics to rally to the Republic and defend the Church by participating in republican politics ('Au milieu des sollicitudes'). This attempt at improving the relationship failed. Deep-rooted suspicions remained on both sides and were inflamed by the Dreyfus Affair (1894–1906). Catholics were for the most part anti-Dreyfusard. The Assumptionists published antisemitic and anti-republican articles in their journal La Croix. This infuriated republican politicians, who were eager to take revenge. Often they worked in alliance with Masonic lodges. The Waldeck-Rousseau Ministry (1899–1902) and the Combes Ministry (1902–1905) fought with the Vatican over the appointment of bishops. Chaplains were removed from naval and military hospitals in the years 1903 and 1904, and soldiers were ordered not to frequent Catholic clubs in 1904.

Emile Combes, when elected Prime Minister in 1902, was determined to defeat Catholicism thoroughly. Shortly after taking office, he closed down all parochial schools in France. Then he had parliament reject authorisation of all religious orders. This meant that all fifty-four orders in France were dissolved and about 20,000 members immediately left France, many for Spain. The Combes government worked with Masonic lodges to create a secret surveillance of all army officers to make sure that devout Catholics would not be promoted. Exposed as the Affaire Des Fiches, the scandal undermined support for the Combes government, and he resigned. It also undermined morale in the army, as officers realized that hostile spies examining their private lives were more important to their careers than their own professional accomplishments.

==== 1905: Separation of church and state ====
Radicals (as they called themselves) achieved their main goals in 1905: they repealed Napoleon's 1801 Concordat. Church and State were finally separated. All Church property was confiscated. Religious personnel were no longer paid by the State. Public worship was given over to associations of Catholic laymen who controlled access to churches. However, in practice, masses and rituals continued to be performed.

A 1905 law instituted the separation of church and state and prohibited the government from recognising, salarying, or subsidising any religion. The 1926 Briand-Ceretti Agreement subsequently restored for a while a formal role for the state in the appointment of Catholic bishops, but evidence for its exercise is not easily obtained. Prior to 1905, the 1801–1808 Concordat compelled the State to support the Catholic Church, the Lutheran Church, the Calvinist Church, and the Jewish religion, and to fund public religious education in those established religions.

For historical reasons, this situation is still current in Alsace-Moselle, which was a German region in 1905 and only joined France again in 1918. Alsace-Moselle maintains a local law of pre-1918 statutes which include the Concordat: the national government pays, as state civil servants, the clergy of the Catholic diocese of Metz and of Strasbourg, of the Lutheran Protestant Church of Augsburg Confession of Alsace and Lorraine, of the Protestant Reformed Church of Alsace and Lorraine, and of the three regional Israelite consistories. It also provides for religious education in those religions in public schools and universities, which since the end of the 20th century is non-compulsory. Also for historical reasons, Catholic priests in French Guiana are civil servants of the local government.

Religious buildings built prior to 1905 at taxpayers' expense are retained by the local or national government, which makes them available at no expense to the religious organisations. As a consequence, most Catholic churches, Protestant temples, and Jewish synagogues are owned and maintained by the government but are assigned by the government to their respective religious communities for "legal, exclusive, free, perpetual use." The government, since 1905, has been prohibited from funding any post-1905 religious edifice, and thus religions must build and support all new religious buildings at their own expense. Some local governments de facto subsidise prayer rooms as part of broader "cultural associations".

=== Recent tensions ===
An ongoing topic of controversy is whether the separation of Church and State should be weakened so that the government would be able to subsidise Muslim prayer rooms and the training of imams. Advocates of such measures, such as Nicolas Sarkozy at times, declare that they would encourage the Muslim population to better integrate into the fabric of French society. Opponents contend that the state should not fund religions. Furthermore, the state ban on wearing conspicuous religious symbols, such as the Islamic female headscarf, in public schools has alienated some French Muslims, provoked minor street protests and drawn some international criticism.

In the late 1950s after the end of the Algerian war, hundreds of thousands of Muslims, including some who had supported France (Harkis), settled permanently to France. They went to the larger cities where they lived in subsidized public housing, and suffered very high unemployment rates. In October 2005, the predominantly Arab-immigrant suburbs of Paris, Lyon, Lille, and other French cities erupted in rioting by socially alienated young people, many of them second- or third-generation immigrants.

American University professor C. Schneider says:

For the next three convulsive weeks, riots spread from suburb to suburb, affecting more than three hundred towns....Nine thousand vehicles were torched, hundreds of public and commercial buildings destroyed, four thousand rioters arrested, and 125 police officers wounded.

Traditional interpretations say the riots were spurred by radical Muslims or unemployed youth. Another view states that the riots reflected broader problem of racism and police violence in France.

In March 2012, a Muslim radical named Mohammed Merah shot three French soldiers and four Jewish citizens, including children in Toulouse and Montauban.

In January 2015, the satirical newspaper Charlie Hebdo, which had ridiculed Muhammad, and a Jewish grocery store came under attack from radicalized Muslims who had been born and raised in the Paris region. World leaders rallied to Paris to show their support for free speech. Analysts agree that the episode had a profound impact on France. The New York Times summarized the ongoing debate:

So as France grieves, it is also faced with profound questions about its future: How large is the radicalized part of the country's Muslim population, the largest in Europe? How deep is the rift between France's values of secularism, of individual, sexual and religious freedom, of freedom of the press and the freedom to shock, and a growing Muslim conservatism that rejects many of these values in the name of religion?

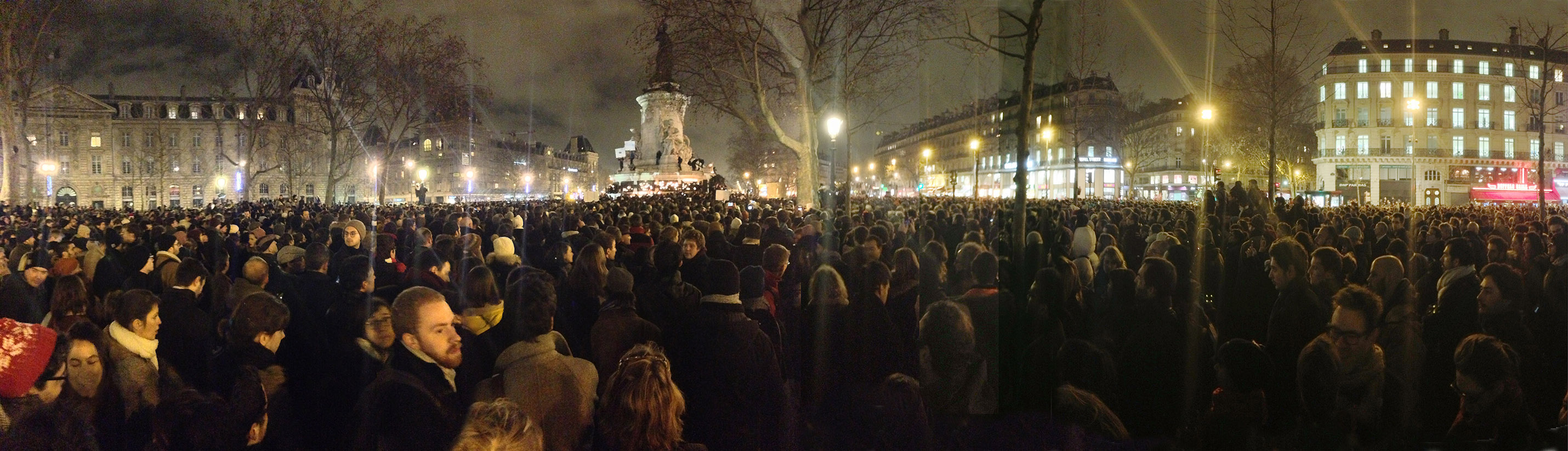
On 11 January 2015, over 1 million demonstrators, plus dozens of foreign leaders, gather at the Place de la Republique to pledge solidarity to liberal French values, after the Charlie Hebdo shooting.

== Religions ==
=== Christianity ===
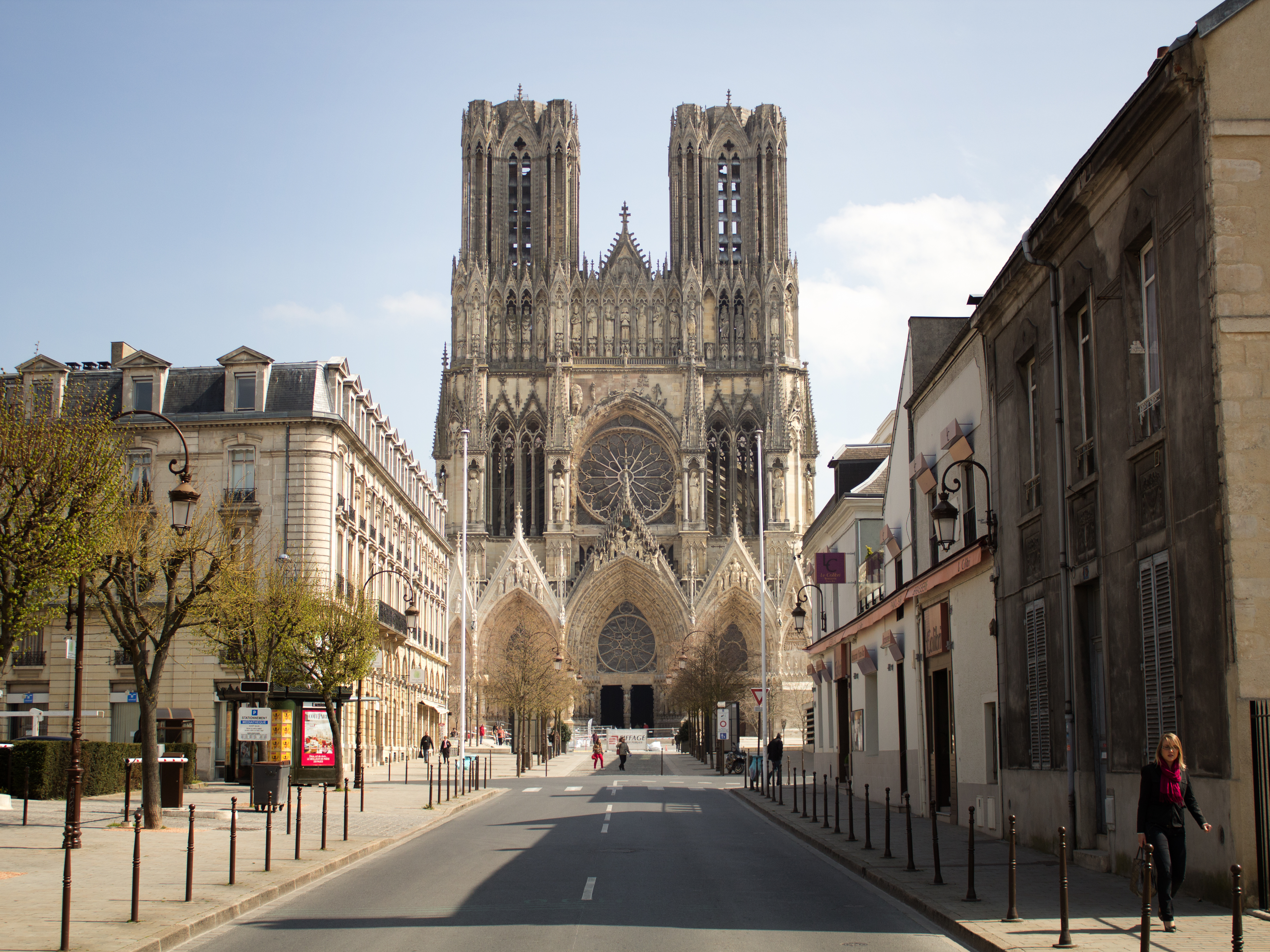
The Reims Cathedral, built on the site where Clovis I was baptised by Remigius, functioned as the site for the coronation of the Kings of France.

Christianity is the largest group of religions of France, but has recently stopped being a majority of the overall population. According to a survey held by Institut français d'opinion publique (Ifop) for the centre-right Institut Montaigne think-tank, 51.1% of the total population of France was Christian in 2016. The following year, a survey by Ipsos focused on Protestants and based on 31,155 interviews found that 57.5% of the total population of France declared to be Catholic and 3.1% declared to be Protestant.

In 2016, Ipsos Global Trends, a multi-nation survey held by Ipsos and based on approximately 1,000 interviews, found that Christianity is the religion of 45% of the working-age, internet connected population of France; 42% stated they were Catholic, 2% stated that they were Protestants, and 1% declared to belong to any Orthodox church.

In 2019, the Eurobarometer, a survey funded by the European Union, found that Christianity was the religion of 47% of the French, with Catholicism being the main denomination with 41%, followed by Orthodox Christian, Protestants and other Christians with 2% each one.

France is home to a number of Marian shrines, notably the Cathedrale Notre-Dame de Chartres in Chartres, Notre Dame de la Salette in La Salette, Notre Dame de Paris in Paris, and the Sanctuary of Our Lady of Lourdes. It is also home to the Taizé Community, an ecumenical Christian monastic fraternity in Taizé, Saône-et-Loire, Burgundy. All are important pilgrimage sites. The Sanctuary of Our Lady of Lourdes appeals to a broader demographic, with 6 million people a year (before the pandemic) visiting Lourdes. With a focus on youth, Taize Community, on the other hand, has become one of the world's most important sites of Christian pilgrimage with over 100,000 young people from around the world converging each year for prayer, Bible study, sharing, and communal work.

=== Islam ===
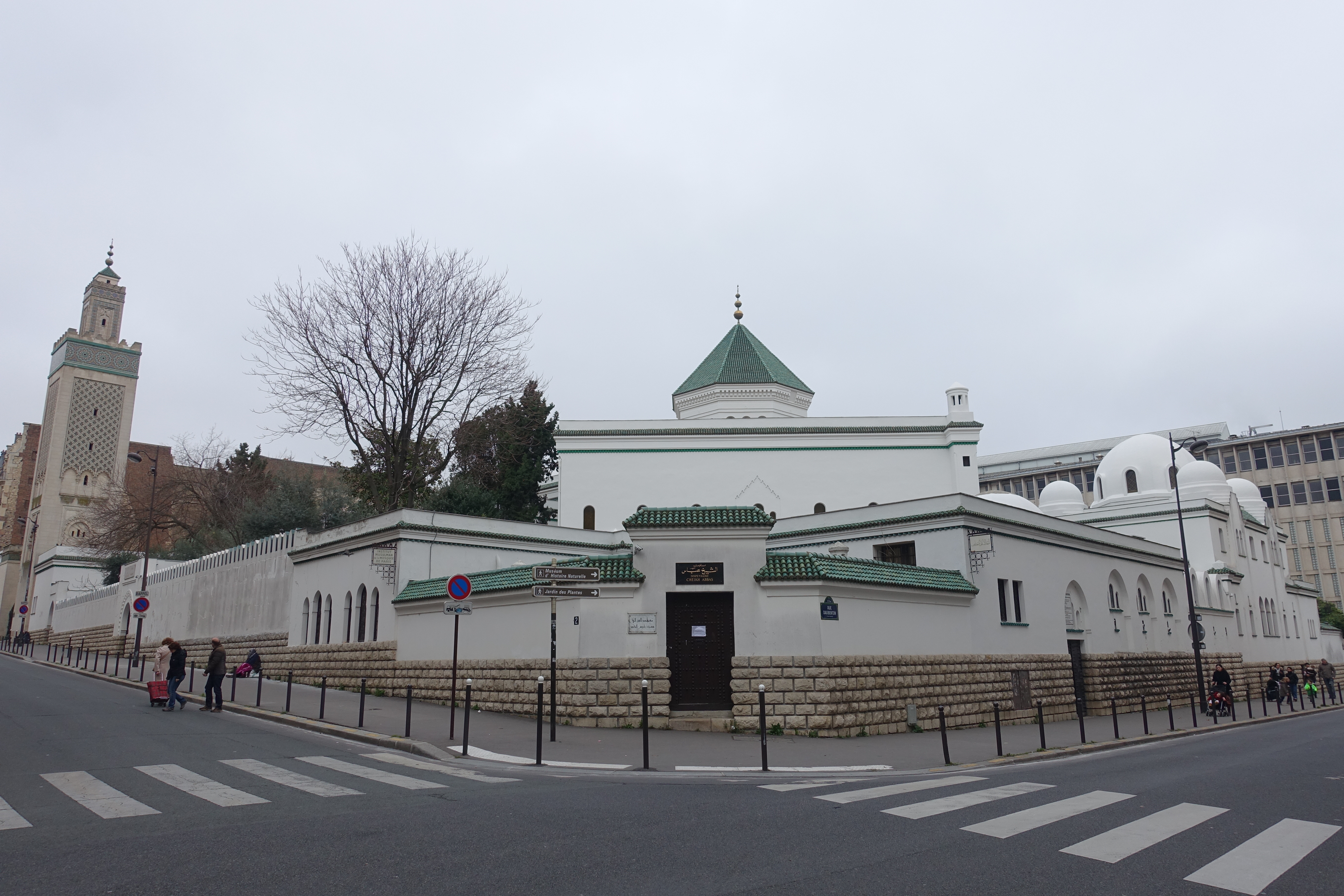
Grand Mosque of Paris

According to a 2023 Insee survey, Islam is ranked the 2nd largest religion in France and 91% of those who were raised in Muslim families in France follow the same religion and faith of their parents. Despite being the 2nd largest religion, 42% of Muslims report being discriminated against.

A report from the French Institute of Statistics in 2024 have reported that 76% of Muslims in France believe that religion is very important while 24% have stated religion played a somewhat important part and role in their life.

The Insee and the National Institute for Demographic Studies in France found that the use of the veil for Muslim women has increased by 55% from 2009 to 2020. There has been an observable increase among all geographic origins, of Muslim women and among second and third generations of Muslim women in France.

A 2016 survey held by Institut Montaigne and Ifop found that 5.6% of the French population had an Islamic background, while 5.3% declared they were Muslims by faith. According to the same survey 84.9% of surveyed people who had at least one Muslim parent said were Muslims, 3.4% were Christians, 10.0% were not religious and 1.3% belonged to other religions.

According to Pew Research, in 2050 France will be 12.7% Muslim in the zero migration scenario (no migration to or from Europe), 17.4% in the medium migration scenario (regular migration continues and refugee flows cease), or 18% in the high migration scenario (2014 to mid-2016 refugee inflow patterns continue as well as regular migration).

=== Judaism ===
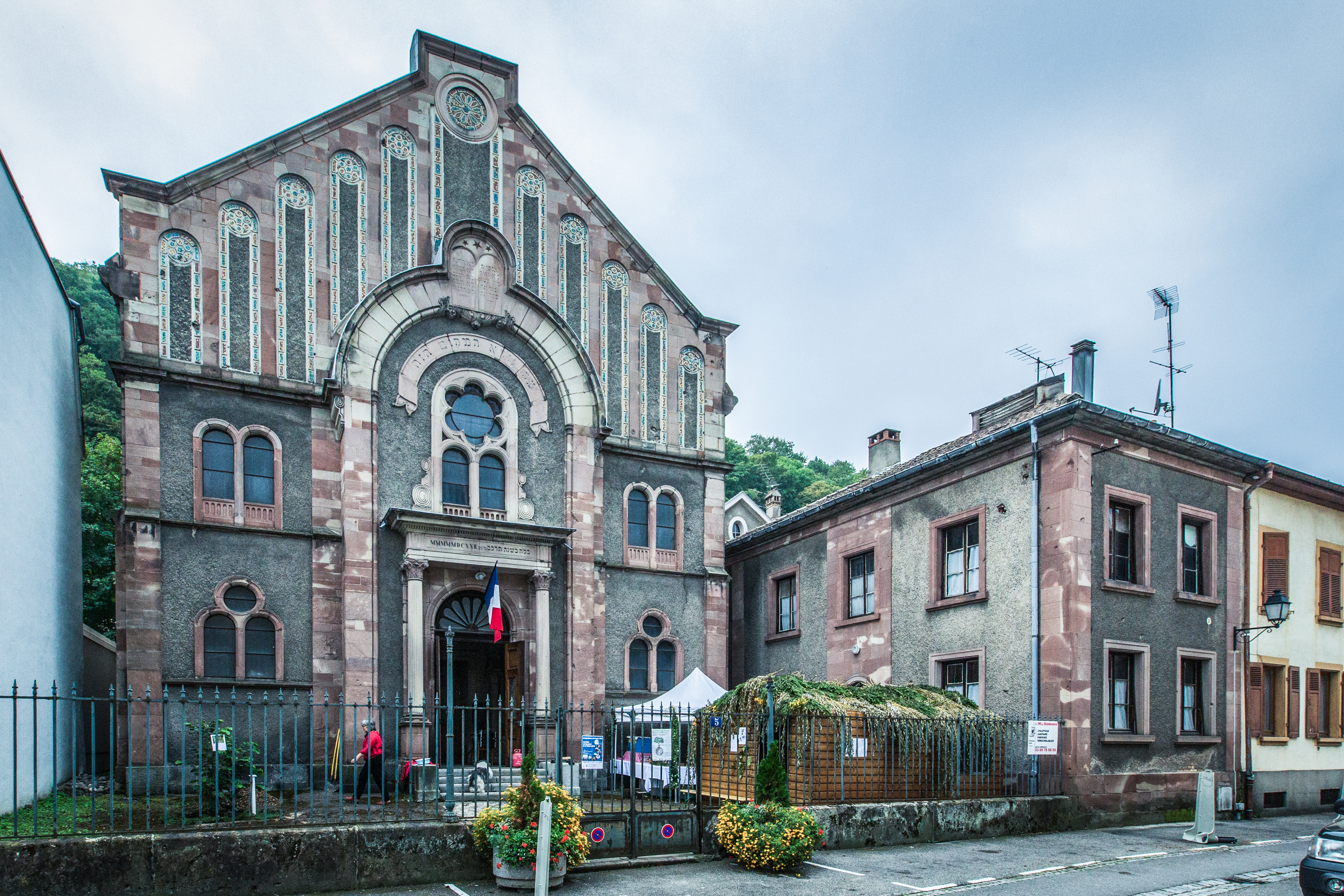
Synagogue of Thann, Haut-Rhin

In 2016, 0.8% of the total population of France, or about 535,000 people, were religious Jews. In the 21st century, France has the largest Jewish population in Europe and the third-largest Jewish population in the world (after Israel and the United States).

Jewish presence in France is documented since the early Middle Ages. France was a center of Jewish learning in the Middle Ages, but persecution increased as the Middle Ages wore on, including multiple expulsions and returns. During the late 18th-century French Revolution, France was the first country in Europe to emancipate its Jewish population. Antisemitism nonetheless persisted despite legal equality, manifested for instance in the Dreyfus affair of the late 19th century.

During World War II, the Vichy government collaborated with Nazi occupiers to deport numerous French Jews and foreign Jewish refugees to concentration camps. 75% of the local Jewish population in France nonetheless survived the Holocaust, but a much higher percentage of the foreign Jewish refugees who had more recently arrived to France were deported and killed.

The majority of French Jews in the 21st century are Sephardi and Mizrahi North African Jews, many of whom (or their parents) emigrated from former French colonies of North Africa after those countries became independent in the 1950s and 1960s. They migrated to France in the second half of the 20th century. French Jews span a wide range of religious affiliations, from the ultra-Orthodox Haredi communities to the large segment of Jews who are entirely secular and who commonly marry outside the Jewish community.

=== Buddhism ===
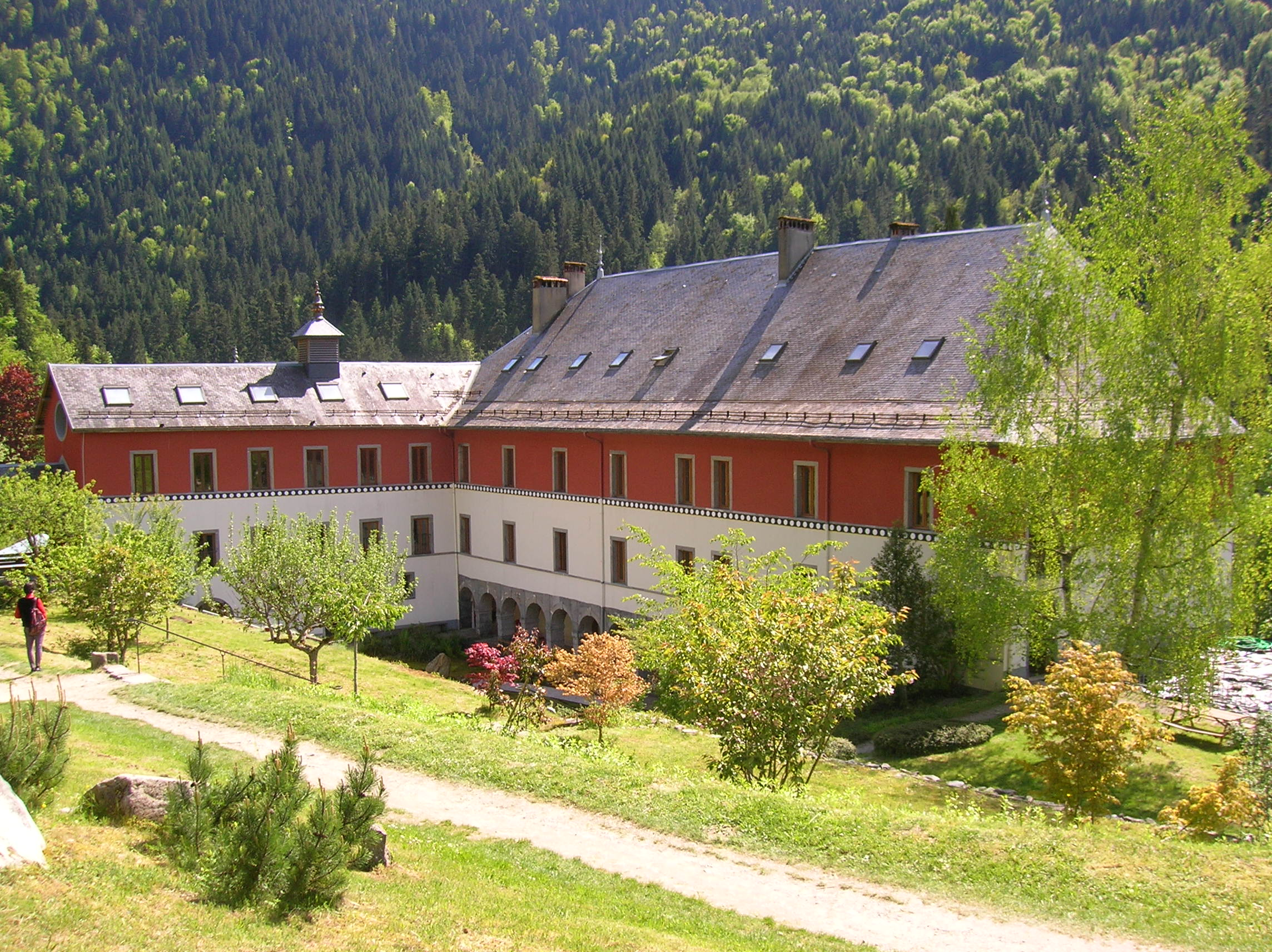
Saint Hugon in Arvillard, Savoie, is a former charterhouse (Carthusian monastery) turned into a monastery of the Tibetan Buddhism (Karma Ling).

In the early 2000s, Buddhism in France was estimated to have between 1 million (Ministry of the Interior) adherents and 5 million people somewhat influenced by Buddhist doctrines, numbers which usually do not show up in surveys because of the vague identity of Buddhism as a religion. The 2020 national survey by the INSEE, indeed, found that 0.5% of the French population, or about 320,000 people, declared themselves Buddhists. According to the scholar Dennis Gira, former director of the Institute of Science and Theology of Religions of Paris, Buddhism in France has a missionary nature and is undergoing a process of "inculturation" that may represent a new turning of the "Wheel of the Dharma", similar to those that it underwent in China and Japan, from which a new incarnation of the doctrine — a "French Buddhism" — will possibly arise.

Various Buddhist traditions are practised in France, including Japanese Zen, Southeast Asian Theravada, Tibetan Buddhism, and Nichiren Buddhism; Mahayana, and Tibetan Buddhism. Two-thirds of French Buddhists are Asian origin, with the majority having ancestry from China and the former French colonies of Vietnam, Laos, and Cambodia. The largest Buddhist statue in Europe is located in Paris within the Pagode de Vincennes.

After exile from Vietnam, highly influential monk Thich Nhat Hanh founded the Plum Village Monastery (Village de Pruniers) and the larger Plum Village Tradition in France. Today, the Plum Village Monastery is one of the largest Buddhist monasteries in Europe and is influential within larger Buddhist practice.

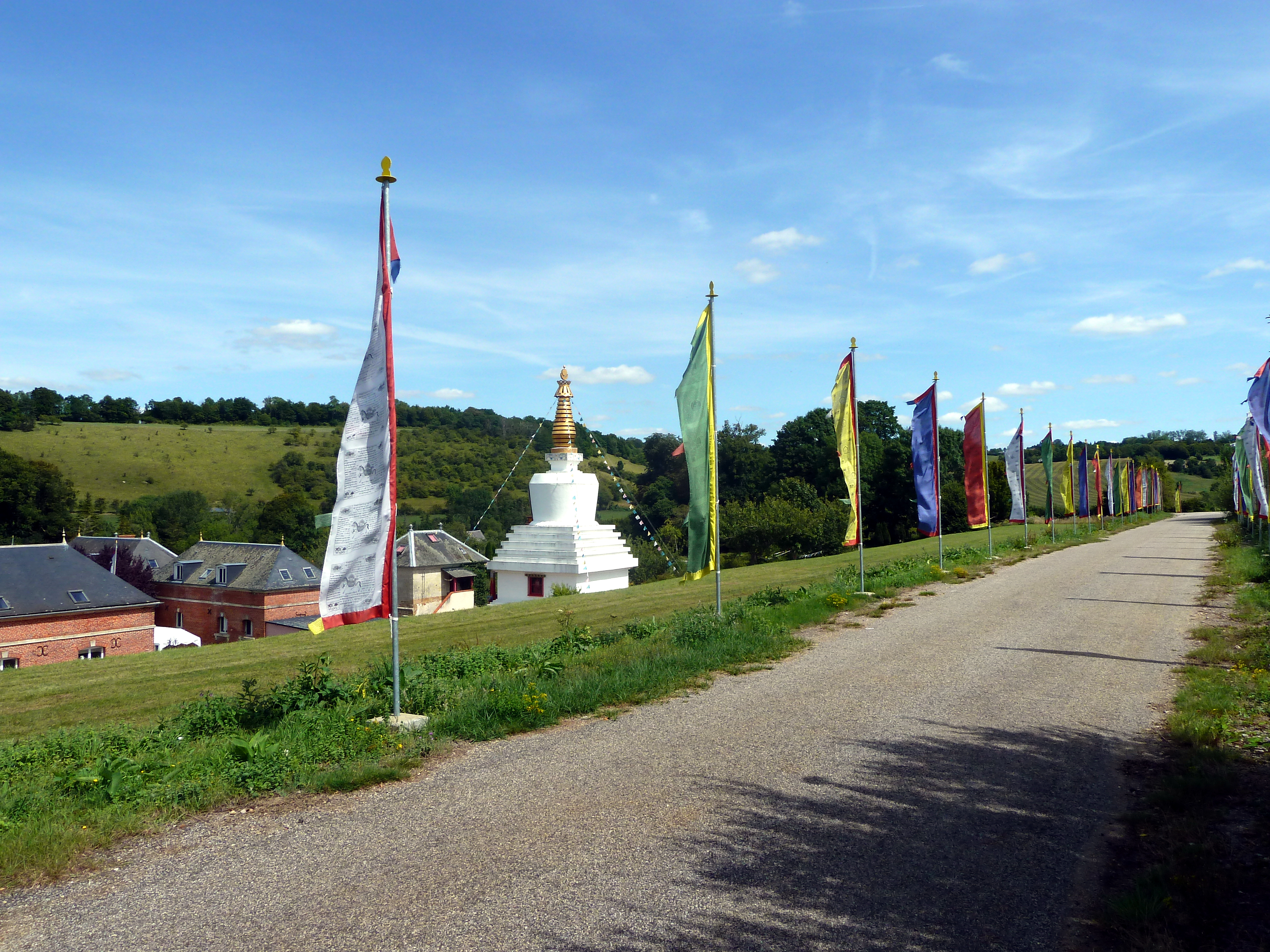
Vajradhara-Ling (Tibetan) in Aubry-le-Panthou, Orne

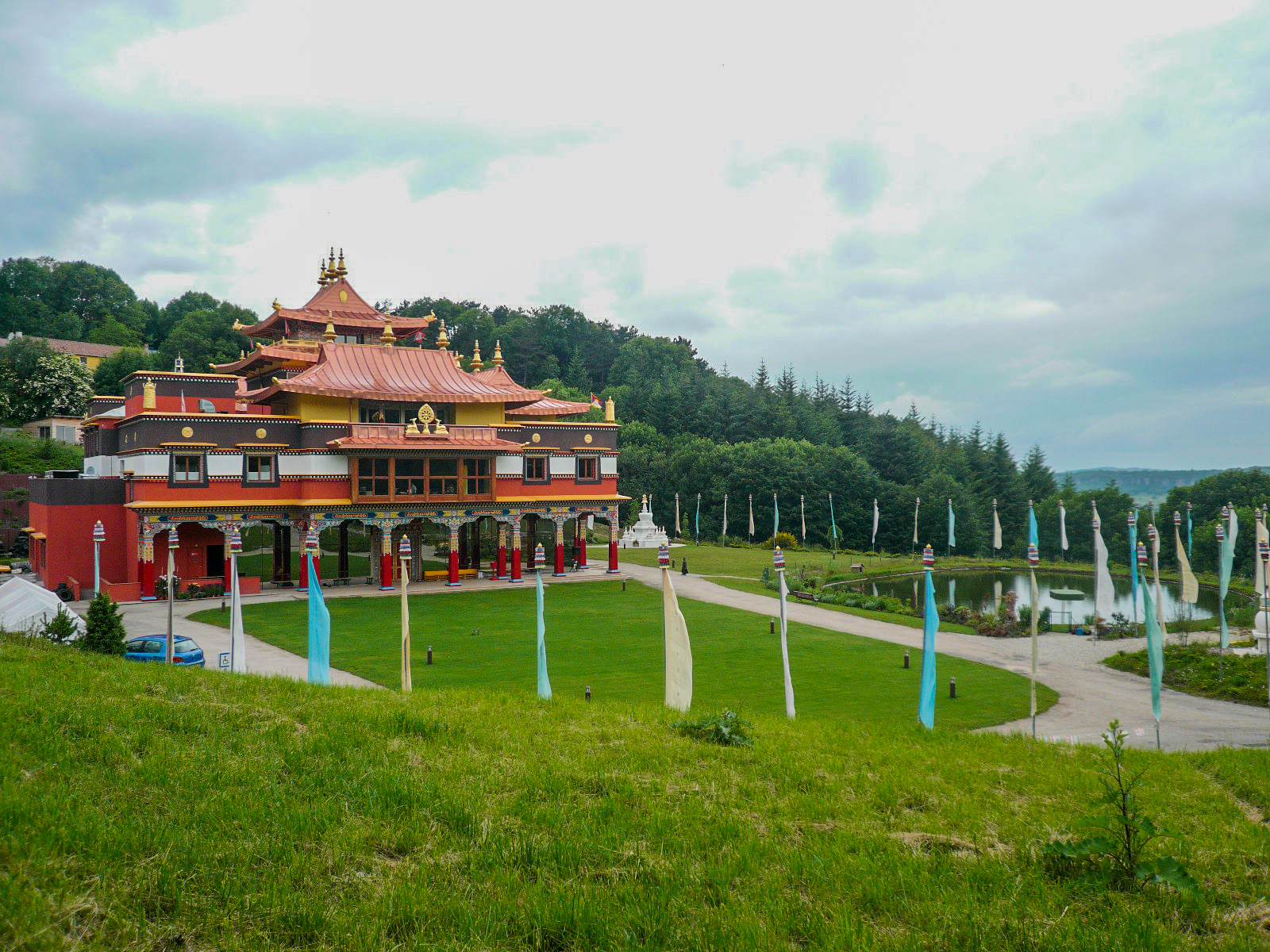
Lerab Ling (Tibetan) in Roqueredonde, Hérault

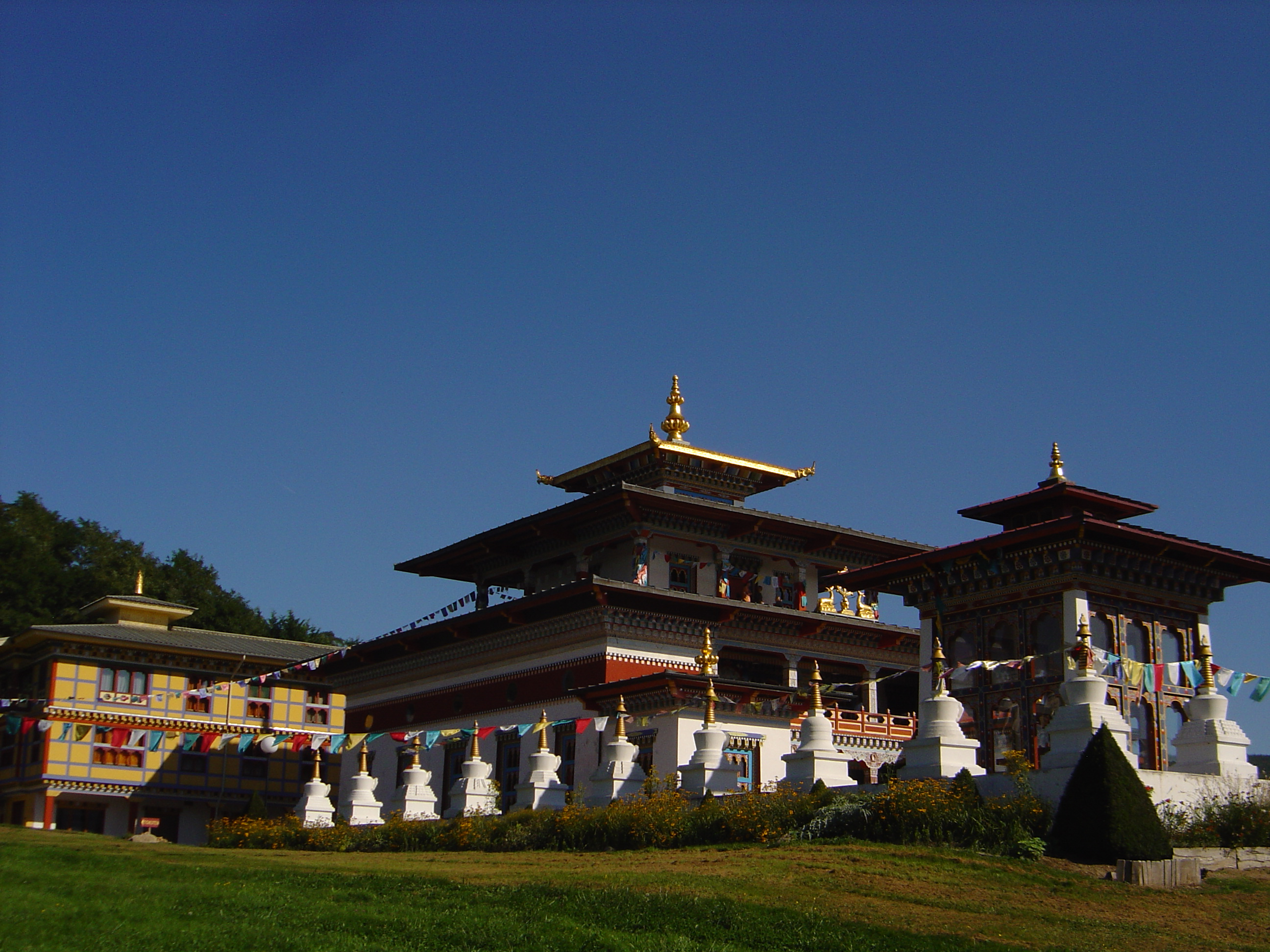
Dashang Kagyu Ling (Tibetan) in La Boulaye, Saône-et-Loire

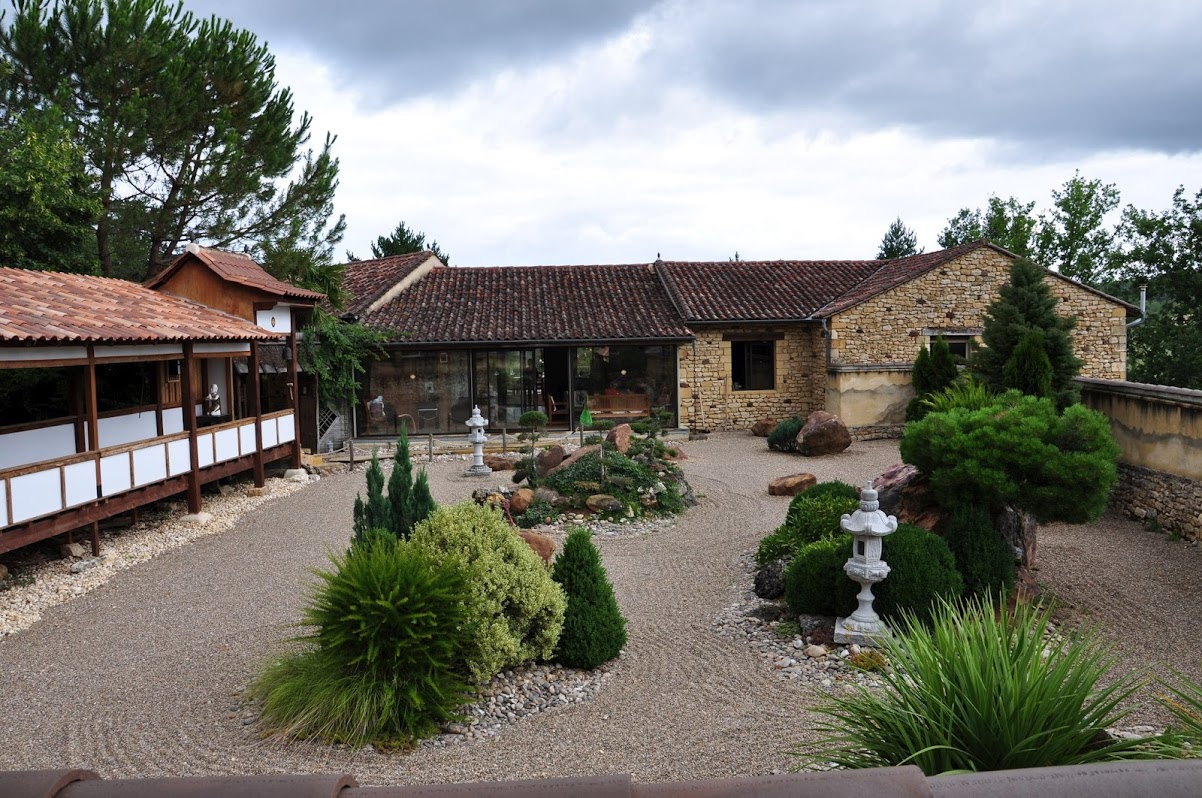
Ho Sho Ji (Japanese Zen) in Larzac, Dordogne

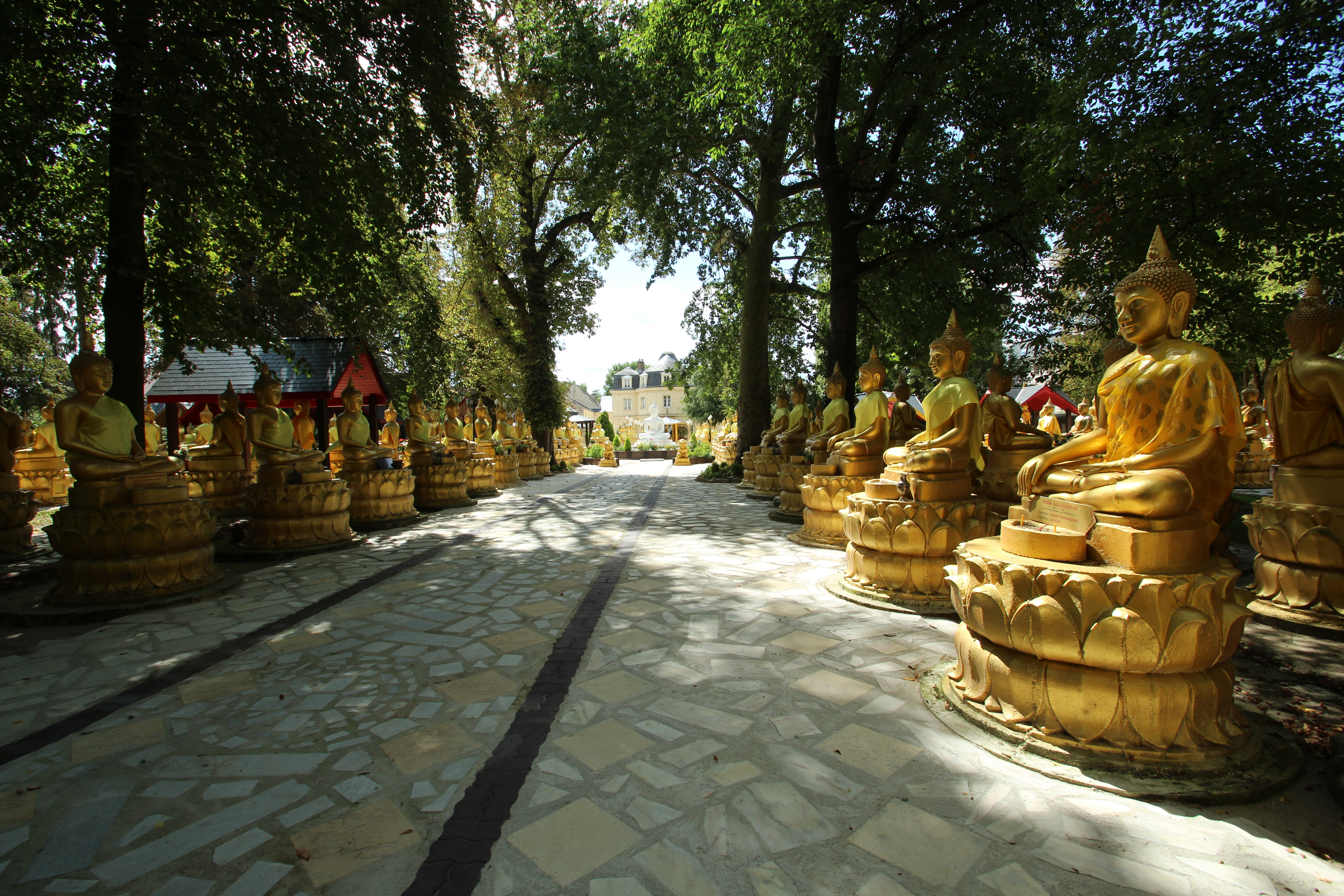
Gardens of Wat Thammapathip (Southeast Asian Theravada) in Moissy-Cramayel, Seine-et-Marne

=== Hinduism ===
Hinduism is a minority religion followed in France by less than 0.1% of total population in 2010, mainly by Indians and Sri Lankans, in whom Tamils community forms a major group in the country. Hinduism is most influential in the French Overseas department of Réunion where Hindus make up 6.7% of the population and most of the large towns have a functioning Hindu temple.

Though being in very small number, the Hindu culture has deeply influenced the society of France by Yoga, Meditation and in recent times organizations like ISKCON have played a major role. Notably, French-Indian Mirra Alfassa known to her followers as The Mother or La Mère founded the Sri Aurobindo Ashram and was highly influential on the philosophy of Integral Yoga.

=== Paganism ===
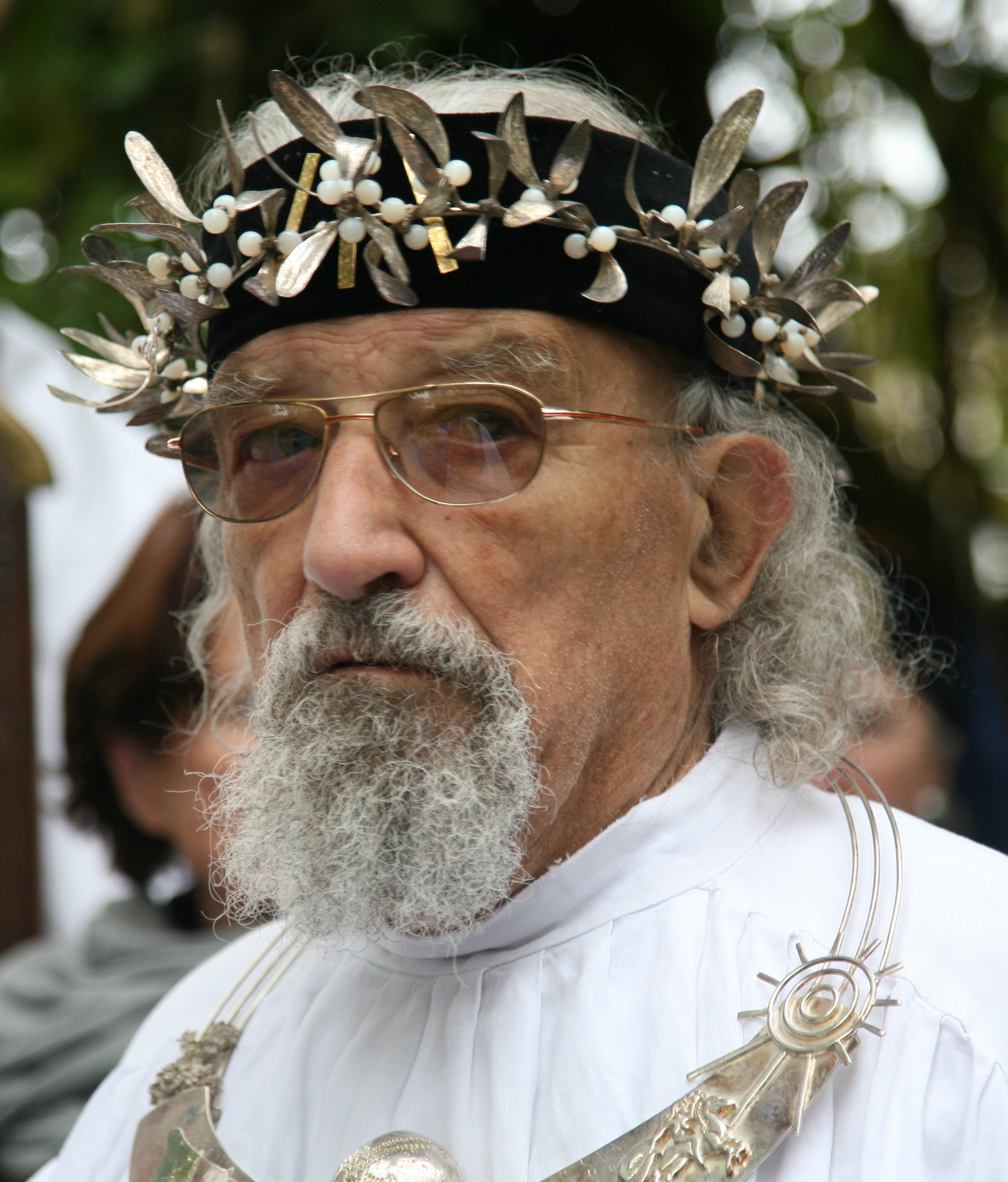
Gwenc'hlan Le Scouëzec, Grand Druid of Brittany and France from 1980 to 2008

Paganism — in the sense of contemporary Neopaganism — in France has been described as twofold, on one side represented by ethnically identitarian religious movements and on the other side by a variety of witchcraft and shamanic traditions without ethnic connotations. According to the French historian of ideas and far-right ideologies Stéphane François, the term "pagan" (Latin paganus), appropriated by Christians to define those who maintained polytheistic religions, forsooth originally meant "countryman" in the sense of "citizen", and therefore defined the "insiders", those belonging to the main cultural tradition and citizenry, whilst its opposite term was "alien" (Latin alienus), which defined the "others", the "outsiders", and therefore Christians. Modern French Pagans belonging to the identitarian movements hark back to this meaning.

Identitarian Pagan movements are the majority among French Pagans and are mostly represented by Celtic Druidry and Germanic Heathenry, and many of them uphold the idea of a superiority of the white race and of the Indo-Europeans, and are aligned with the Nouvelle Droite political movement, espousing the idea that each ethnically defined folk has its own natural land and natural religion. The identitarian Pagan movement promotes a warrior ethic against what it perceives as an erosion of French and European culture due to immigration and Islamisation, so that Jean Haudry, a longtime identitarian Pagan and professor of linguistics at Lyon III, in a 2001 article entitled Païens ! for the journal of the organisation Terre et Peuple wrote that "Pagans will be at the forefront of the reconquest (of Europe)". Dominique Venner, who committed suicide in 2013 inside Notre-Dame de Paris in protest against the erosion of French culture, was a Pagan close to the Research and Study Group for European Civilisation (GRECE), an identitarian Pagan think-tank founded by the Nouvelle Droite ideologist Alain de Benoist. Other politically engaged Pagans include Pierre Vial, who with other members of the National Front was among the founders of Terre et Peuple.

=== Other religions ===
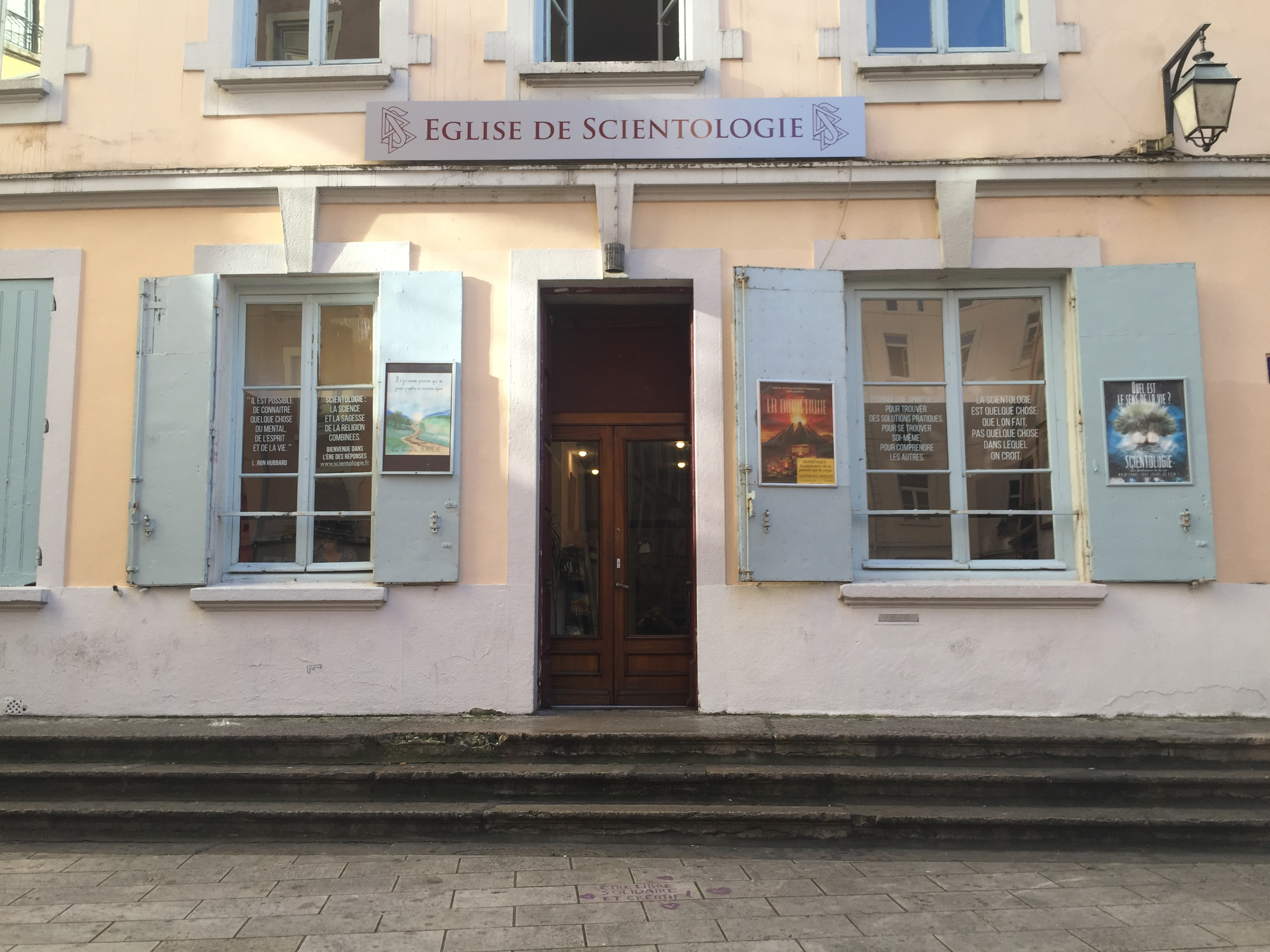
Hall of the Church of Scientology in Lyon

The 2020 national survey conducted by the INSEE found that about 1% of the French population adhered to minority religions not identifiable as Christian, Islamic, Buddhist, or Jewish. According to the French sociologist Régis Dericquebourg, in 2003 the main small religious minorities were Christian groups — including the Jehovah's Witnesses (130,000 members and 70,000 sympathisers, categorised as Christians), Adventists, Evangelicals, Mormons (31,000 members) —, Scientologists (4,000). According to the 2007 edition of the Quid encyclopedia, other notable religious minorities included the New Apostolic Church (20,000), Dunovism (20,000), Sukyo Mahikari (15,000–20,000), the New Acropolis (10,000), the Universal Alliance (1,000), and the Grail Movement (950). There are approximately 300 Caodaists in France, many of whom are former boat-people or children of boat-people.

Dericquebourg further documented that groups with around 1,000 members included Antoinism, Aumism, Christian Science, Invitation to Life, Raëlism, and the International Society for Krishna Consciousness (Hare Krishna), while Unificationism had around 400 members. Since the 1990s, the French government has been closely monitoring minority religious groups — through the Parliamentary Commission on Cults in France and the MIVILUDES — in order to identify socially disruptive and/or dangerous tendencies among them.

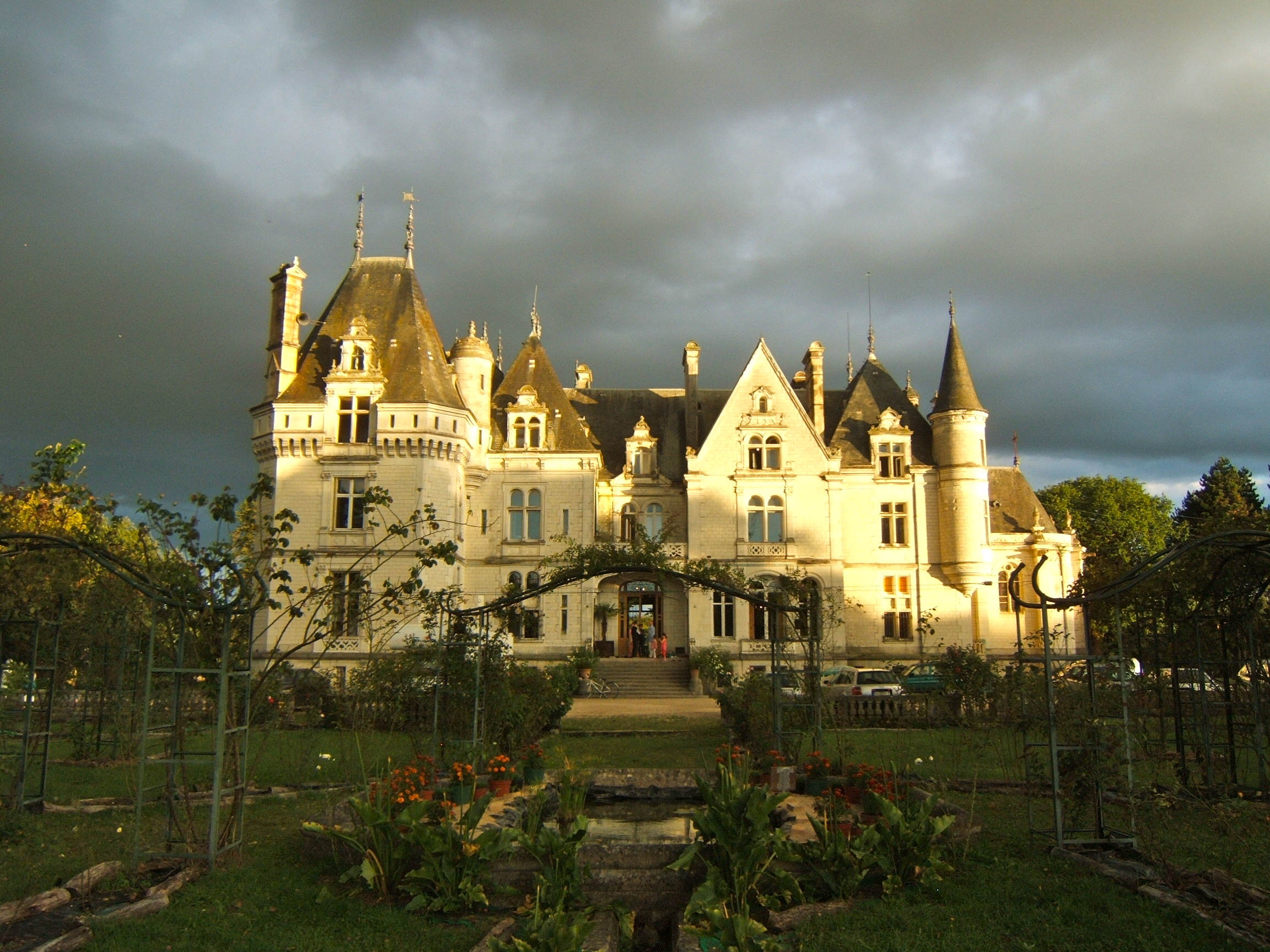
New Mayapur Temple of the Hare Krishna in Luçay-le-Mâle, Indre

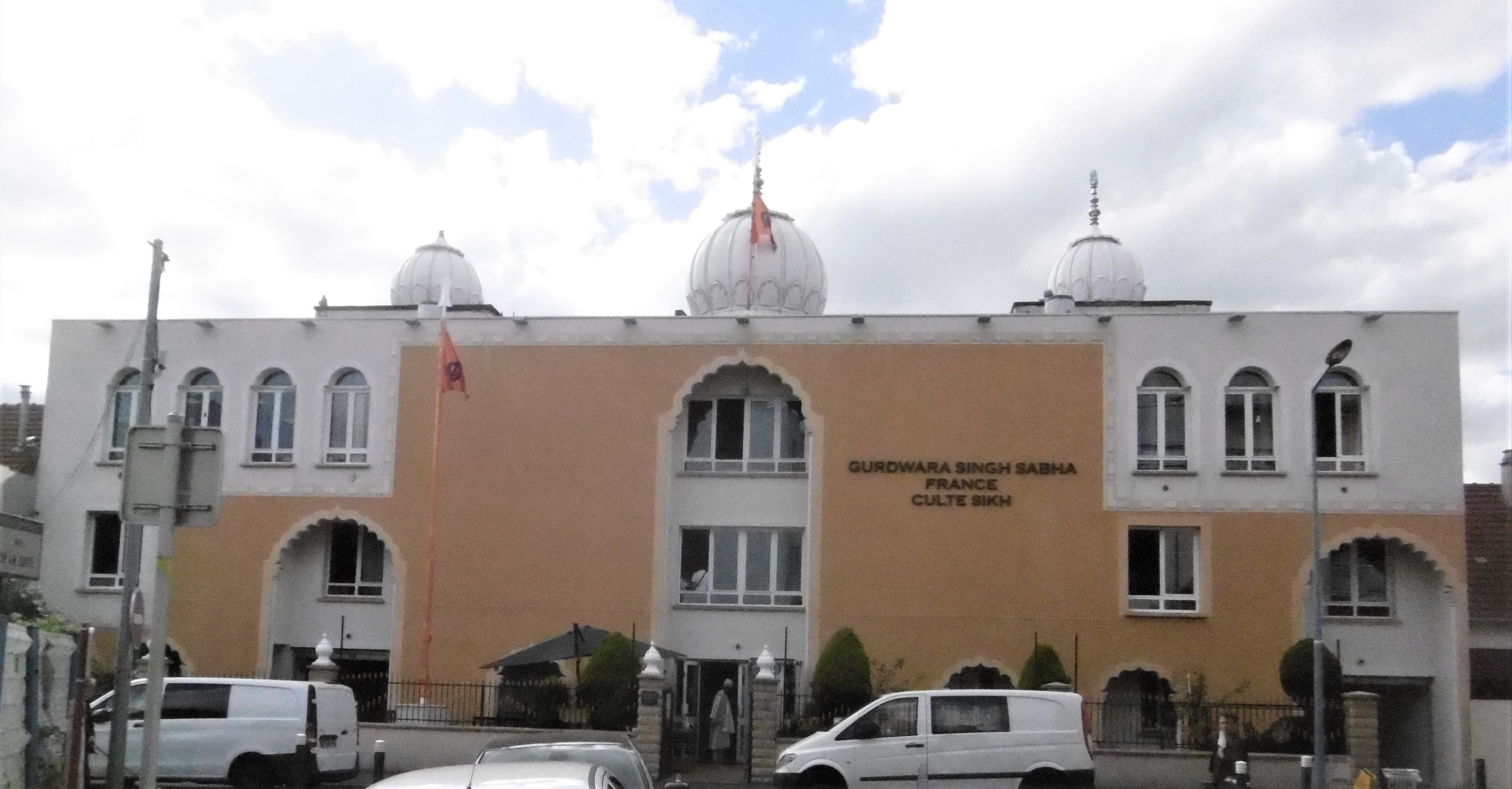
Singh Sabha Temple of the Sikh community in Bobigny, Île-de-France

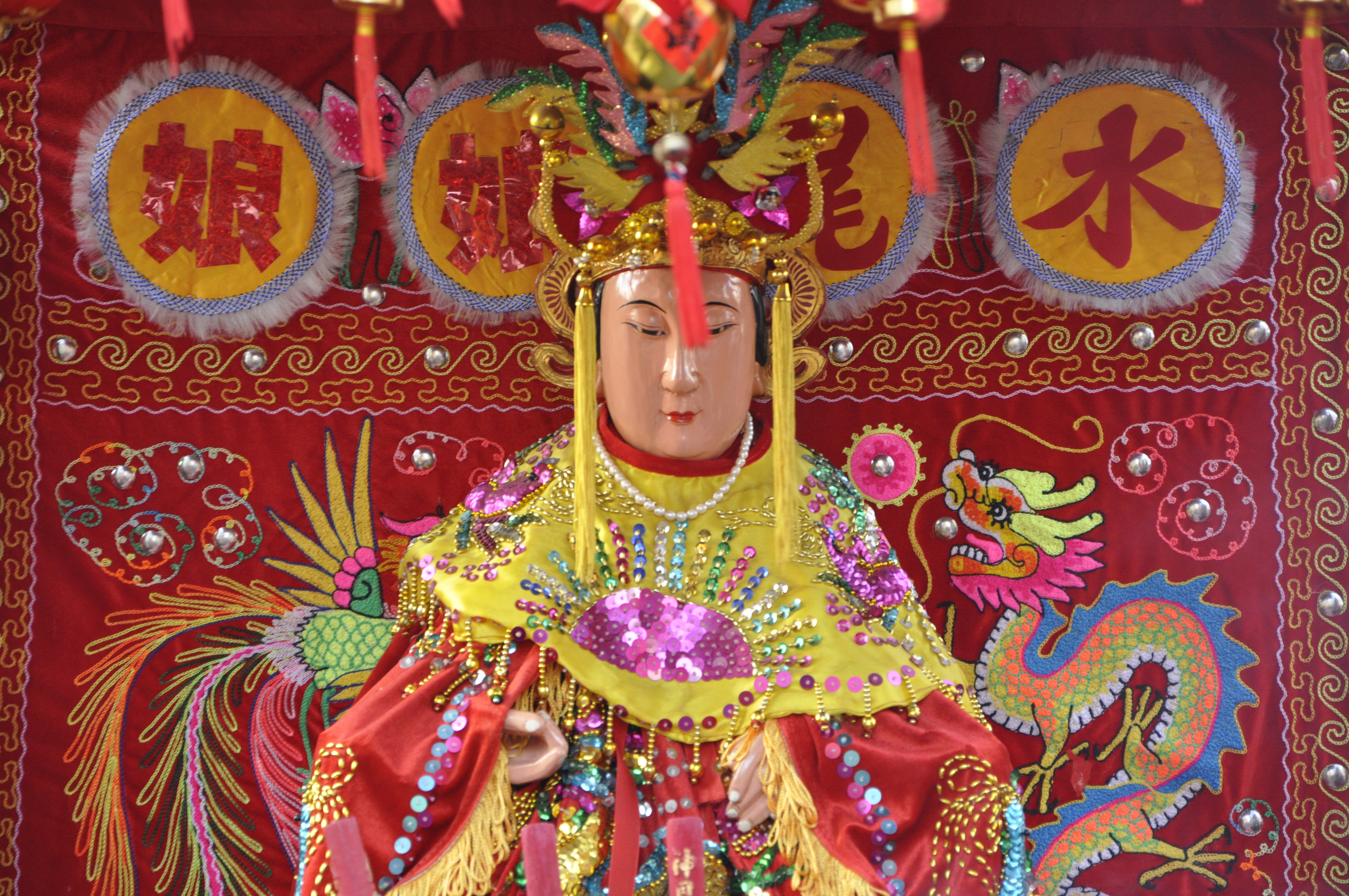
Statue of the goddess Shuiwei Shengniang of Hainanese folk religion, carried in procession for the 2011 Chinese New Year in Paris

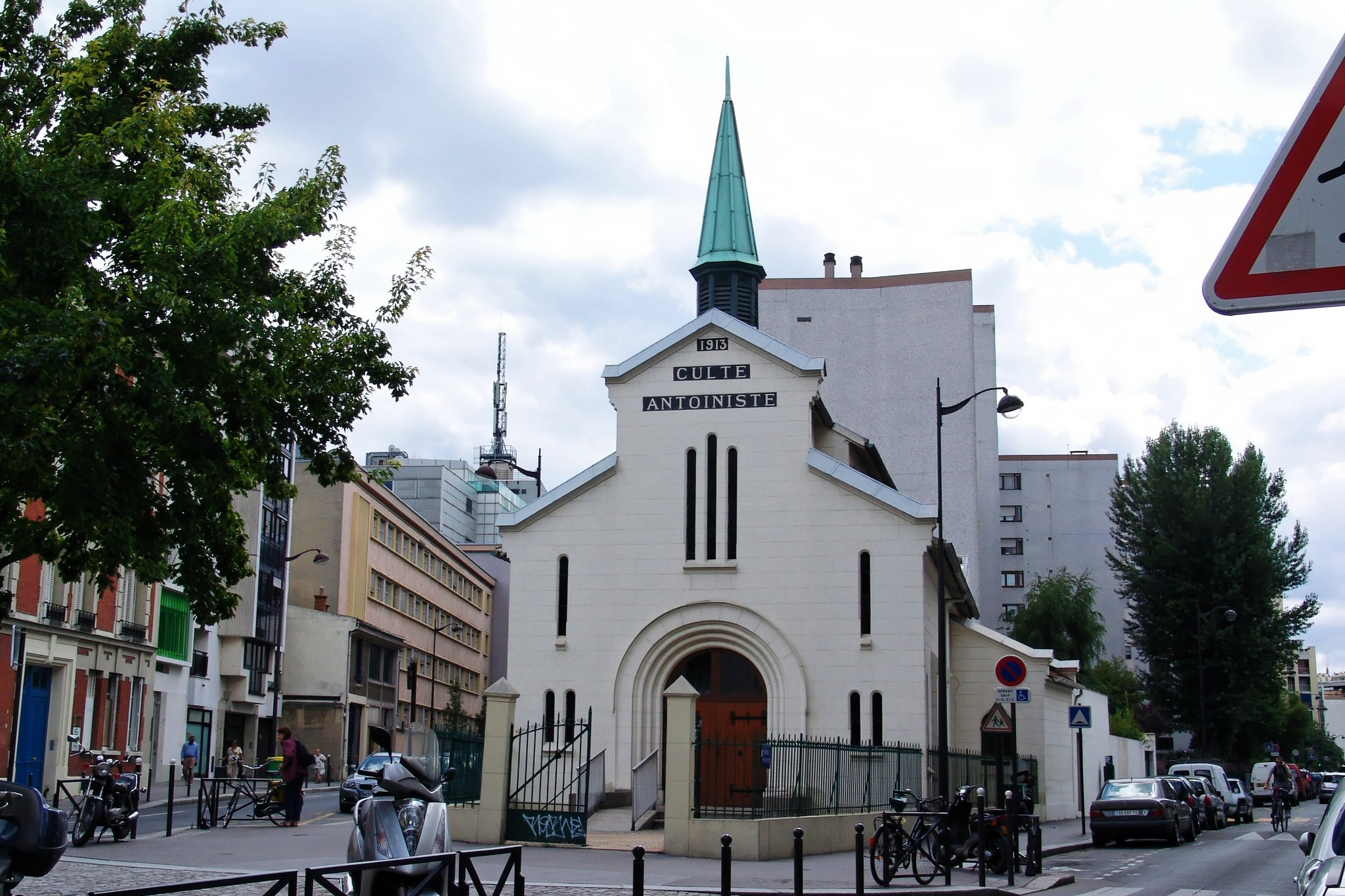
Antoinist temple in Paris, Rue Vergniaud

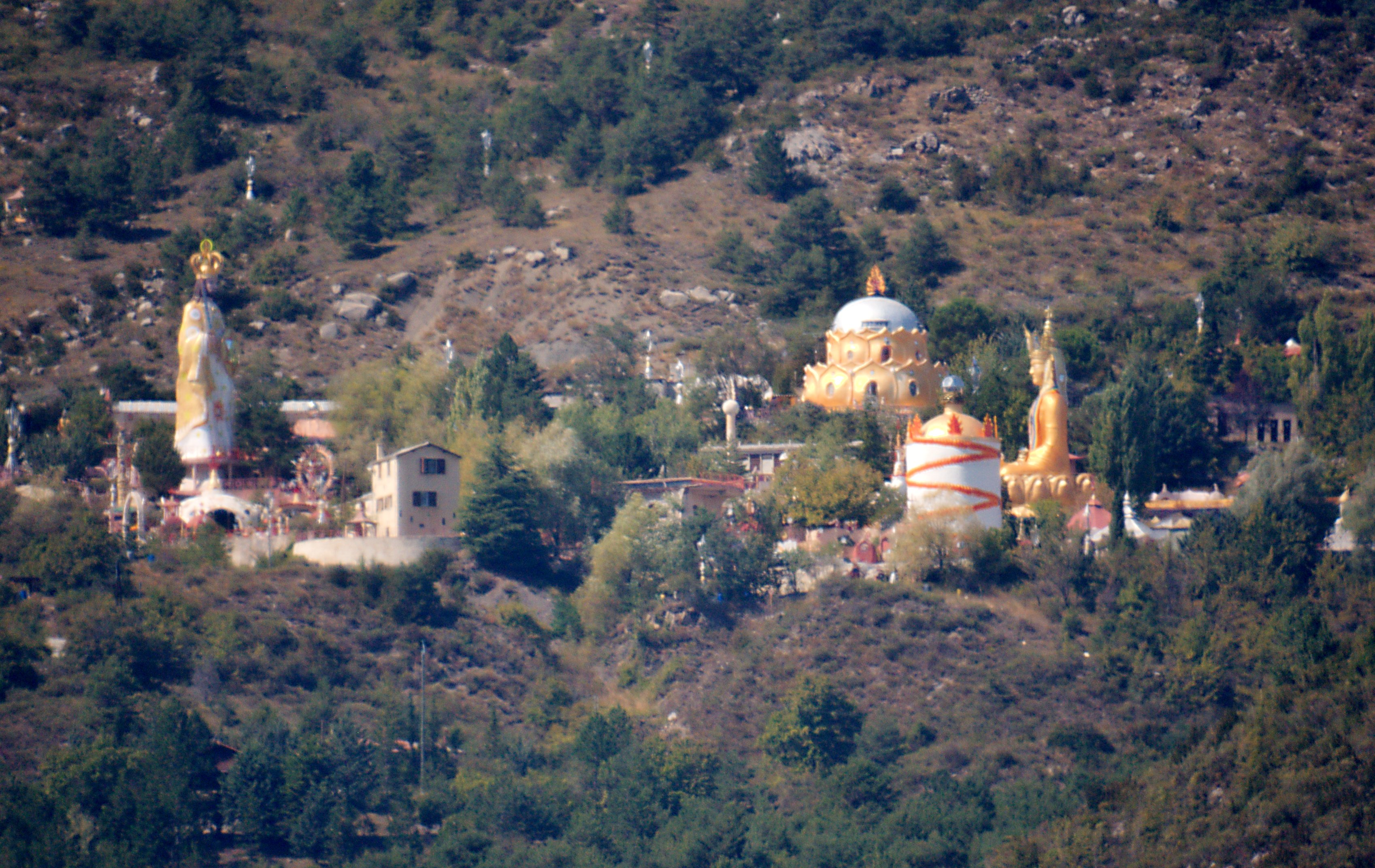
Mandarom, the main centre of Aumism near Castellane, Alpes-de-Haute-Provence

== Main religious bodies in France ==
Independent religious bodies and associations.

Main religious bodies in France
Religion	Religious body
Roman Catholicism	Bishops' Conference of France
Islam	French Forum of Islam
Protestantism	Protestant Federation of France
Eastern Orthodoxy	Assembly of Canonical Orthodox Bishops of France
Judaism	Israelite Central Consistory of France
Buddhism	Buddhist Union of France

== Controversies and incidents ==
=== Growth of Islam and conflict with laïcité ===
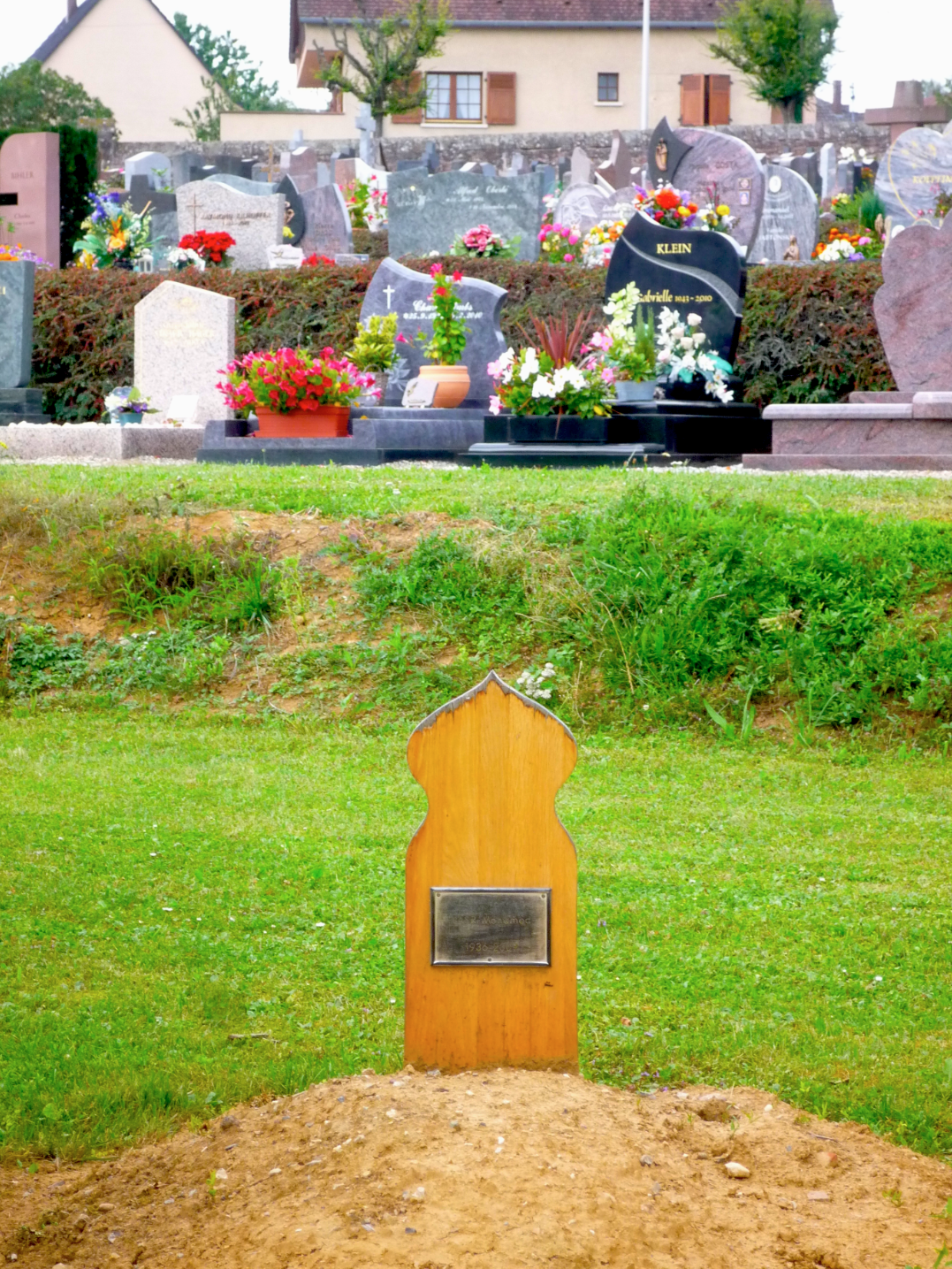
Islamic grave at a French cemetery

In Paris and the surrounding Île-de-France region, French Muslims tend to be more educated and religious, and the vast majority of them consider themselves loyal to France. Among Muslims in Paris in the early 2010s, 77% disagreed when asked whether violence is an acceptable moral response for a noble cause or not; 73% said that they were loyal to France; and 18% believed homosexuality to be acceptable.

In 2015, there were 2,500 mosques in France, up from 2,000 in 2011. In 2015, Dalil Boubakeur, rector of the Grand Mosque of Paris, said the number should be doubled to accommodate the large and growing population of French Muslims.

Financing the construction of mosques was a problematic issue for a long time; French authorities were concerned that foreign capital could be used to acquire influence in France, and so in the late 1980s it was decided to favour the formation of a "French Islam", though the 1905 law on religions forbids the funding of religious groups by the state. According to Salah Bariki, advisor to the mayor of Marseille in 2001, at a Koranic school in Nièvre, only three percent of the books were written in French, and everything was financed from abroad. She supported the public's participation in financing an Islamic cultural centre in Marseille to encourage Muslims to develop and use French learning materials in order to thwart foreign indoctrination. Even secular Muslims and members of civil society were to be represented by the centre. Local authorities have financed the construction of mosques, sometimes without minarets, and called them Islamic "cultural centres" or municipal halls rented to "civil associations". In the case of the plans to build the Mosque of Marseille, due to protests and a tribunal decision by the National Rally, the National Republican Movement, and the Mouvement pour la France, the rent of an 8,000 m^{2} (86,111 sq ft) terrain for the mosque was increased from €300/year to €24,000/year and the renting period was reduced from 99 to 50 years.

== See also ==
- 1905 French law on the Separation of the Churches and the State
- Anti-clericalism
- Dechristianisation of France during the French Revolution
- Freedom of religion in France
- Irreligion in France
- Jules Ferry laws
- Laïcité
