= Montfavet =

City district in Avignon, France

Coordinates: 43°56′8″N 4°52′25″E

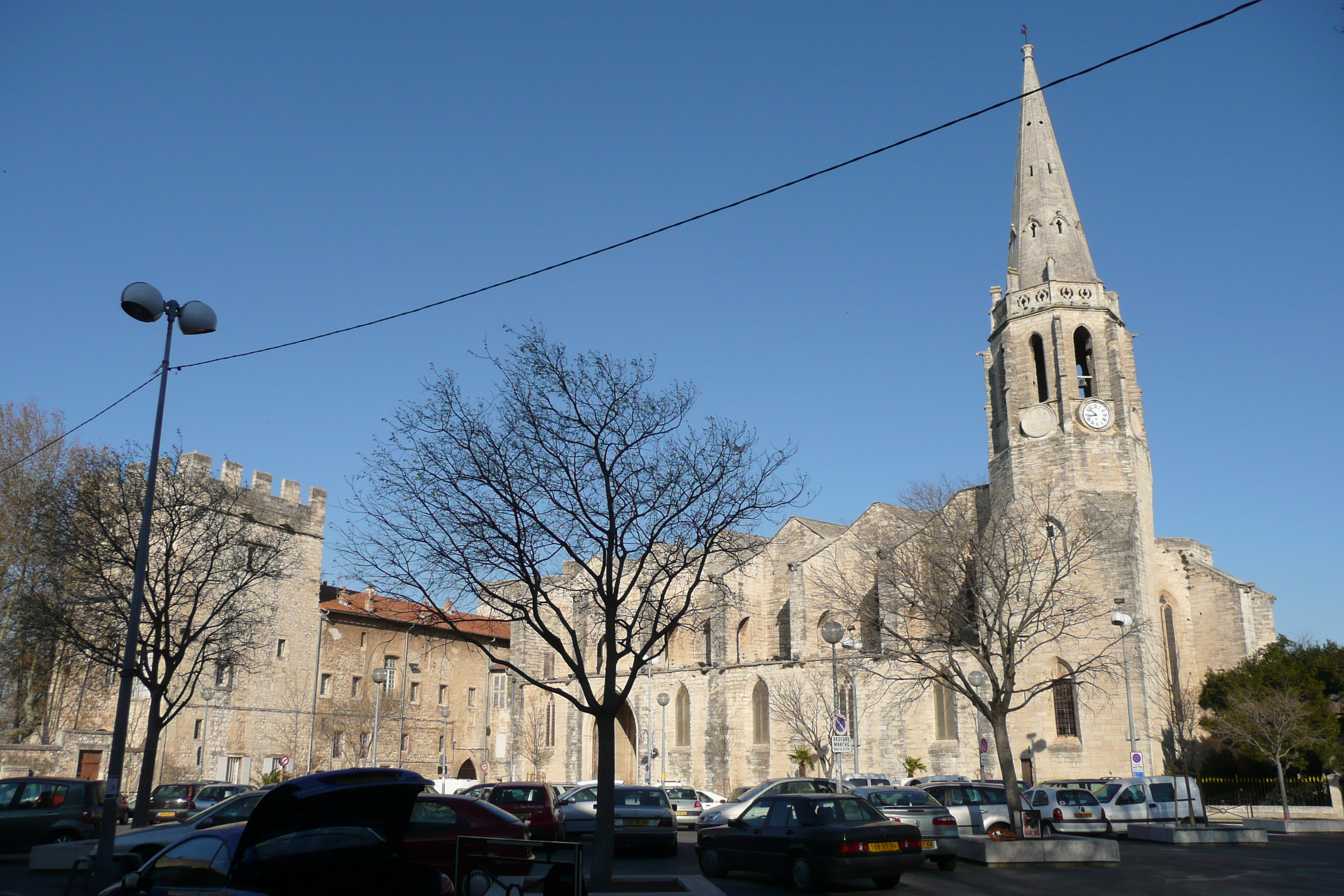
Notre-Dame-de-Bon-Repos (14th century)

Montfavet is a district of the city of Avignon in the Vaucluse in the Provence-Alpes-Côte d'Azur region.

In southern France, the district is well known for the psychiatric hospital, "Centre Hospitalier Montfavet Avignon" located Montdevergues. Sculptor Camille Claudel was a patient in this hospital for thirty years. Georges-Ernest Roux (1903–1981), a postman who lived in Avignon, founded the Universal Christian Church (now named Universal Alliance), claimed to be Jesus, and was famous under the name "Christ of Montfavet".

The local airport is built on property within Montfavet.

== Notable people ==
- Camille Claudel was confined in the town asylum and is buried in the town cemetery.

== See also ==
- Avignon
- Avignon Provence Airport
