= Universal Alliance =

- Classification: Christianity
- Leader: Georges Roux
- Distinct fellowships: 2,000 — 3,000
- Region: France, francophone countries, Africa
- Official website: alliance-universelle.org

The Universal Alliance (French: Alliance universelle), formerly known as Universal Christian Church (Église chrétienne universelle) and followers as Christ's Witnesses (Témoins du Christ), is a Christian-oriented new religious movement founded in France in 1952 by Georges Roux, a former postman in the Vaucluse department. Roux claimed to be the reincarnation of Christ and was thus named the "Christ of Montfavet", a village on the commune of Avignon where he lived then.

He wrote three books containing the doctrines of the religious group, including the rejection of several dogmas commonly accepted by the main churches (Jesus' divinity and resurrection, the existence of the Devil, and the accuracy of the Gospels, among other things). Vegetarian diet, high degree of proselytism and miraculous healings were the main practices of the organization. The group grew quickly in France and some other countries, counting several thousands of faithful, but memberships are currently on the decline.

After Roux's death in 1981, the Universal Christian Church was replaced by the Universal Alliance, a cultural association founded in August 1983 and led by one of Roux's daughter. In the 1950s, the religious group was the subject of criticisms in the media when some faithful and their children died after having refused medical treatments, and was classified as a cult in the 1995 parliamentary report established by the Parliamentary Commission on Cults in France.

== Founder ==
Born on 14 June 1903 in Cavaillon from an unbeliever father and a Catholic mother, George Ernest Roux quickly abandoned the faith after reading Plato's works, and became factor in 1920. In the late 1920s, he went to Paris to try an artistic career, and composed, among other things, a poem (Le Cercle d'airain), a novel (Le toit de paille), and a one-act play (Le Bienheureux). On 12 April 1928, he married Jane Robert, and they had together six children raised in Catholicism. Then he founded a symphony orchestra and composed an opera (L'Auréole) in 1939, but the beginning of the World War II forced him to resume service as inspector at the post office in Avignon, where it stayed until December 1953. His meticulous work earned him an appointment as assistant inspector sorting of letters. In 1947, he was said to have a gift of healing and began to miraculously heal thousands of patients in his detached house named "La Préfète" in Montfavet, bought in 1933 by his mother. He published three spirituality-related books which explained his doctrine. In 1947, then in 1950, he told his family that he was the incarnation of Jesus Christ, then made the assertion publicly in February 1954. On 15 August 1973, Roux even claimed to be God. He died on 26 December 1981.

== Organization ==
In the early 1950s, some followers of Roux created the Christian Agency of Information (Agence Chrétienne d'Information, ACI) in the 10th arrondissement of Paris, 18 rue d'Enghien. From 1953, they published two monthly leaflets: Lumière and Le Témoin de la vie.

On 24 December 1952, Roux, then known as the Christ of Montfavet or Georges-Christ, founded the Universal Christian Church whose faithful were widely named the Christ's Witnesses. There was no hierarchical structure: the local groups were informal and autonomous, but the most important ones (in Avignon, Paris, Strasbourg, Toulon) formed associations for organizational purposes. Roux's daughters Genevieve and Jacqueline, Jacqueline's husband René Van Gerding, and René's sister Eva participated in the development of the church, while Roux lived cloistered in his property in Montfavet.

On 15 June 1983, the Universal Alliance officially replaced the Universal Christian Church. Its statutes, filed at the Prefecture of Avignon, were modified in 2004. With about 500 subscribers, this cultural association aims to air and translate Roux's writings and to organize conferences by Jacqueline Roux.

Sociologist Régis Dericquebourg defined the Christian Agency of Information as a "movement", the Universal Christian Church as an "ecclesia" and the Universal Alliance as a "circle". He considered the Universal Alliance a "network of thought and spirituality circles", which perpetuates Roux's teachings and has a Quaker and charismatic-related spirituality.

== Beliefs ==
The doctrines are contained in three books written by Roux: Journal d'un guérisseur (1950), Paroles du guérisseur (1950) and Mission divine (1951), and explained in the monthly magazine Messidor, published from 1951 to 1977. Roux presented himself as a persecuted prophet, said to be Christ and to carry out the law of love unfulfilled by God's representatives including Jesus. He wrote a strong criticism of Christian churches deemed as apostate, asked in a letter Pope Pius XII to officially recognize his reincarnation and sent open letters to priests, occultists and theosophists. Roux denied the existence of the Devil, original sin, Jesus' virgin birth and resurrection, and the truthfulness of the Gospels. He taught that everyone could be a healer with prayer and blessing if he had faith in him. Roux announced the Last Judgment for 1 January 1980 at the latest and said that the Universal Alliance would have to spread across the world. In 1953, some disasters, including outs levees in the Netherlands and earthquakes in the Greek islands, were used by the religion as proof of the proximity of the Apocalypse. According to Le Monde, followers said in 1954 to believe in flying saucers.

According to Régis Dericquebourg, this movement presents a new version of Christianity: there is no syncretism, but it is strongly tinged with Gnosticism and can be described as a "Christic esotericism". The founder was successively a mystagogue, then a prophet, and the group was first based on a personal and prophetic charisma, then a sacramental charism, then a group charism. The group defines itself as "christian", then "christic", also developed environmentalism and the "idea of a symbiosis between man and nature as the foundation of health and spiritual improvement".

== Practices ==
In the Universal Christian Church, religious ceremonies began with a modified version of "Our Father" and ended with a meal together. The crucifix was not used. There were five sacraments: baptism, marriage, confirmation-communion, communion of mind in meetings, and funeral. The religious group proposed, but did not require, a vegetarian diet excluding cannings, potatoes, sugar, salt, alcohol, tobacco and tea. The faithful actively participated in proselytism by distribution of leaflets and door-to-door, and there were sometimes stands in some fairs of major cities and parades of sandwich boards in Paris. Several members, including veteran Jean Thos in Paris, were candidates for legislative elections of 2 January 1956; in its political program, the religious movement said wanting to follow God's will and pointed social issues as homeless, armament, exploitation of workers by employers. It obtained about 10,000 votes in six departments.

In the Universal Alliance, there is no sacrament. The meetings, now called "communion of the flesh", are composed of spontaneous dialogues under divine inspiration. Evangelism is no longer required and children attend the public school.

== Membership ==
Membership of the Universal Christian Church reached a peak of 5,000 between 1955 and 1960, in about fifty local groups (Marseille, Nantes, Paris, Strasbourg, Toulon, etc.). Members seem primarily urban, from middle class (teachers, employees...), and Catholic disillusioned by traditional religions. However, membership gradually decreased in subsequent years mainly because of Roux's death and various incidents in the late 1950s which reflected some difficult relationships with the society (child deaths, negative statements in the press, destruction of premises belonging to the group...). in the 2000, they are about 3,000 members of the Universal Alliance worldwide spread in francophone countries, Germany, Italy, U.S. and some countries in Africa, and shared out into fifty communities, and about 1,000 in France. Groups are mainly located in the Provence-Alpes-Côte d'Azur region and the Aude department. In the 1990s, Belgian press reported presence of followers and conferences by Jacqueline Roux in the country.

== Reception ==
In the 1950s, refusals of medical treatments led to the death of several children, including a 13-year boy in October 1953, a young girl in March 1954, and a three-month baby in September 1954. These cases were the subject of a strong coverage in the press, particularly in Paris-Match. For their part, the church's leaders often tried, in news conferences, to justify these deaths, presenting them as "rewards offered to Christ". Deaths of adults were also mentioned in media (e.g. Willy Baruch in March 1954, Raymond Joutard in July 1954). However, Roux was never sued for unauthorized practice of medicine.

In 1995, the Universal Alliance was included in the list of cults of the report by the French parliamentary commission. In 1996, Jacqueline Roux wrote to Alain Gest, a member of the commission, to question this classification, highlighting financial transparency, democratic nature and compliance with the law of her association.

Because of its particular doctrinal views, the religious group is criticized by main Christian churches, including evangelical associations.
