= Invitation to Life =

French nonprofit organization

- Classification: New Religious Movement
- Leader: Yvonne Trubert
- Region: France, Europe, America, Africa, China
- Official website: www.ivi-international.org/

Invitation to Life (often known as IVI) is a not-for-profit organisation founded in Paris in 1983 by Yvonne Trubert. Régis Dericquebourg deemed the group as a “healing-oriented religion,” although it prefers not to be considered as a religion and includes members active in different religions.

== History ==
Yvonne Trubert was born in Laurenan, Brittany in 1932 in a Roman Catholic family. While living in Paris, she discovered what her friends believed to be effective healing powers and she started gathering them in informal groups. By 1982, she had gathered some 60 members who decided that an association should be formally incorporated. This happened in 1983, and the association Invitation à la Vie (Invitation to Life) was born.

Eventually, IVI developed in several other countries, and by 2000 it had several thousand members. Most of them remained active Roman Catholics and IVI became known for its mass pilgrimages, mostly to Catholic centers such as Lourdes, Fatima, and Mont Saint-Michel. In 1987, however, the French Catholic Bishops published a declaration claiming that IVI was a “gnostic” movement whose syncretism was incompatible with orthodox Catholicism.

In France in 1995 and 1999, IVI was included in governmental lists of cults and sects (in 1995 under the name “Invitation à la vie intense”).

== Main doctrines ==
Déricquebourg believes that healing is the center of IVI, and the main reason it attracts members. Healing, however, is seen by IVI as part of a larger process of “harmonization,” where members are seeking harmony with themselves, the nature, and God.

To achieve these aims, IVI proposes three “keys”: prayer, harmonization (intended as a specific technique), and vibrations. The Roman Catholic Rosary is the main prayer suggested, but prayer and harmonization are often practiced together. In IVI’s harmonization, an experienced member called “harmonizer” asks the “harmonized” to lie on a table and focus on the prayers recited by the harmonizer, who also practices a soft massage. “Vibrations” are collective chants and sounds supposed to create harmony and peace.
