= Iconoclasm during the French Revolution =

Iconoclasm played a significant role during the French Revolution, reflecting the broader social, political, and religious shifts of the time. This movement was fueled by revolutionaries with anti-monarchical sentiments who wished to destroy visual representations of the Catholic Church and the Ancien Régime. The early revolutionary period was characterized by growing social inequality, fueled by a heavy tax burden on peasants, who made up 80% of the French population in 1789. This was exacerbated by tax exemptions for the nobility and clergy, as well as the difficulty of tax reform. Iconoclastic acts during the French Revolution embodied a time that saw the systematic destruction and defacement of religious and royal symbols, cathedrals, manuscripts, and artworks. Iconoclasm took many forms during this period, acting as a symbolic rejection of the Ancien Régime and a direct attack on religious institutions and symbols, which were seen as key pillars of the Ancien Régime.

== Major incidents ==
Painted by Jean-Pierre Housël, Prise de la Bastille depicts the day of July 14, 1789, in which a mob of revolutionaries overthrew the Bastille prison and set its captives free.

=== Storming of the Bastille ===
The Bastille was a fortress prison in Paris. It symbolized the absolute power and arbitrary justice of the Bourbon monarchy. On July 14, 1789, the storming of this fortress was regarded as the beginning of the French Revolution. It was not just an attack on the prison but on what it represented—the monarchical tyranny. The raiding was successfully overthrown later. When raiding the Bastille, the French revolutionaries came in large numbers and completely overwhelmed it after fierce fighting. Then the Bastille was taken down brick by brick, and its parts were distributed throughout France as a show of victory. This acted as a parade of the fallen monarchical power.

=== Early acts of iconoclasm ===
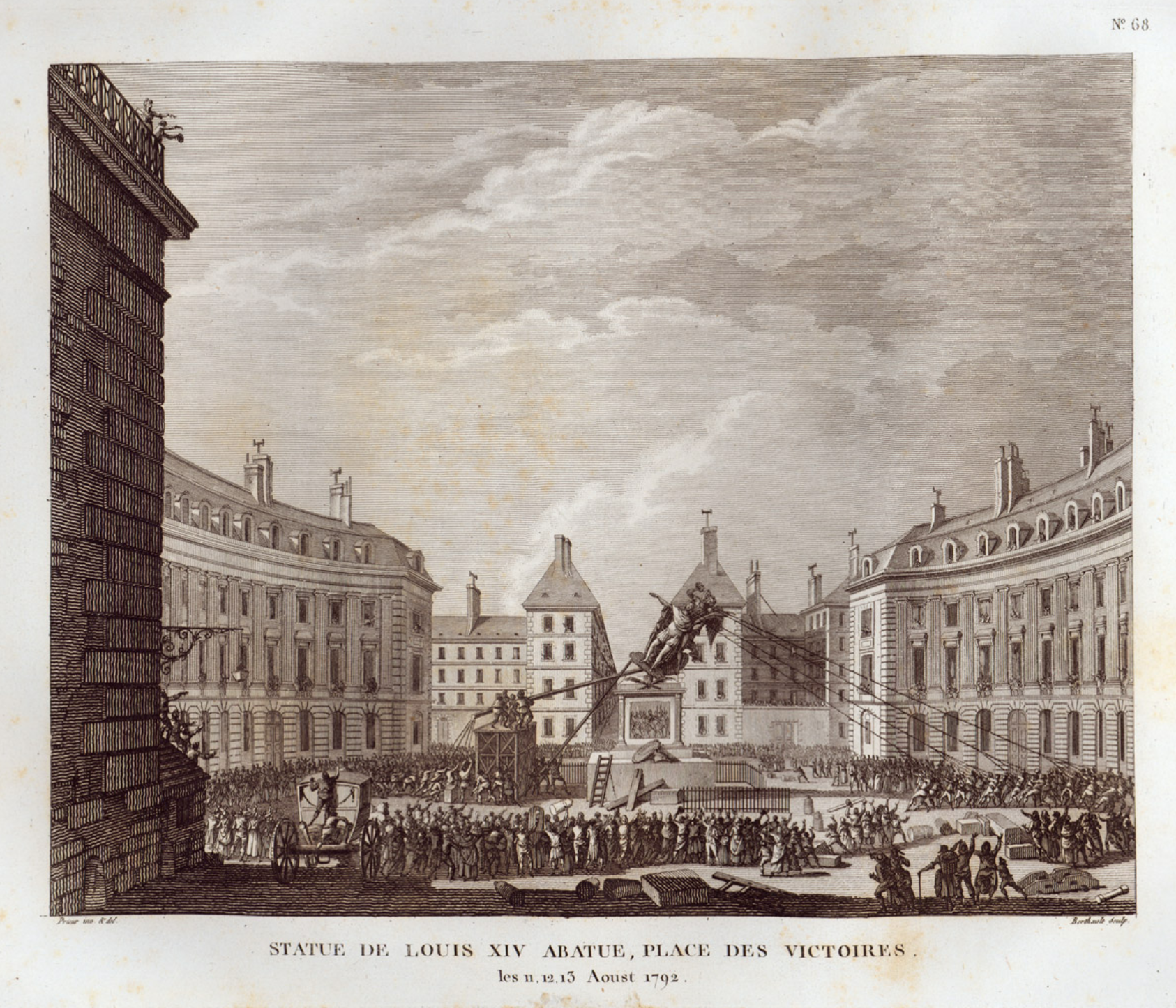
Berthault, Pierre-Gabriel (1804) Large crowd forcefully pulls down a statue of Louis XIV in the Place de Victoires during the French Revolution

In a petition to the National Assembly in early 1790, a group of artists requested that the king order the destruction of all monuments created during the feudal regime. Feudalism had been outlawed the year prior, and this action further aimed to deface the image of the nobility. By 1792, peasants had begun to tear down feudal monuments within France. The public's general feelings and overt acts of destruction inspired the Legislative Assembly to pass a law mandating the destruction of these feudal monuments on August 11, 1792. A key act of iconoclasm during this period was the removal of the statue of Louis XIV from Place Des Victoires. Louis XIV was king of France from 1643 until 1715, making his 72-year reign the longest of any sovereign. His rule embodied the European Age of Absolutism, a period characterized by unchecked monarchical power. Thus, the removal of this statue was not just a physical act of vandalism, but a powerful symbolic destruction of the Ancien Régime’s authority over the people. The statue was pulled down by a large crowd with long ropes, emphasizing the importance of public spectacles in the overthrow of monarchical power.

=== Destruction of cathedrals ===
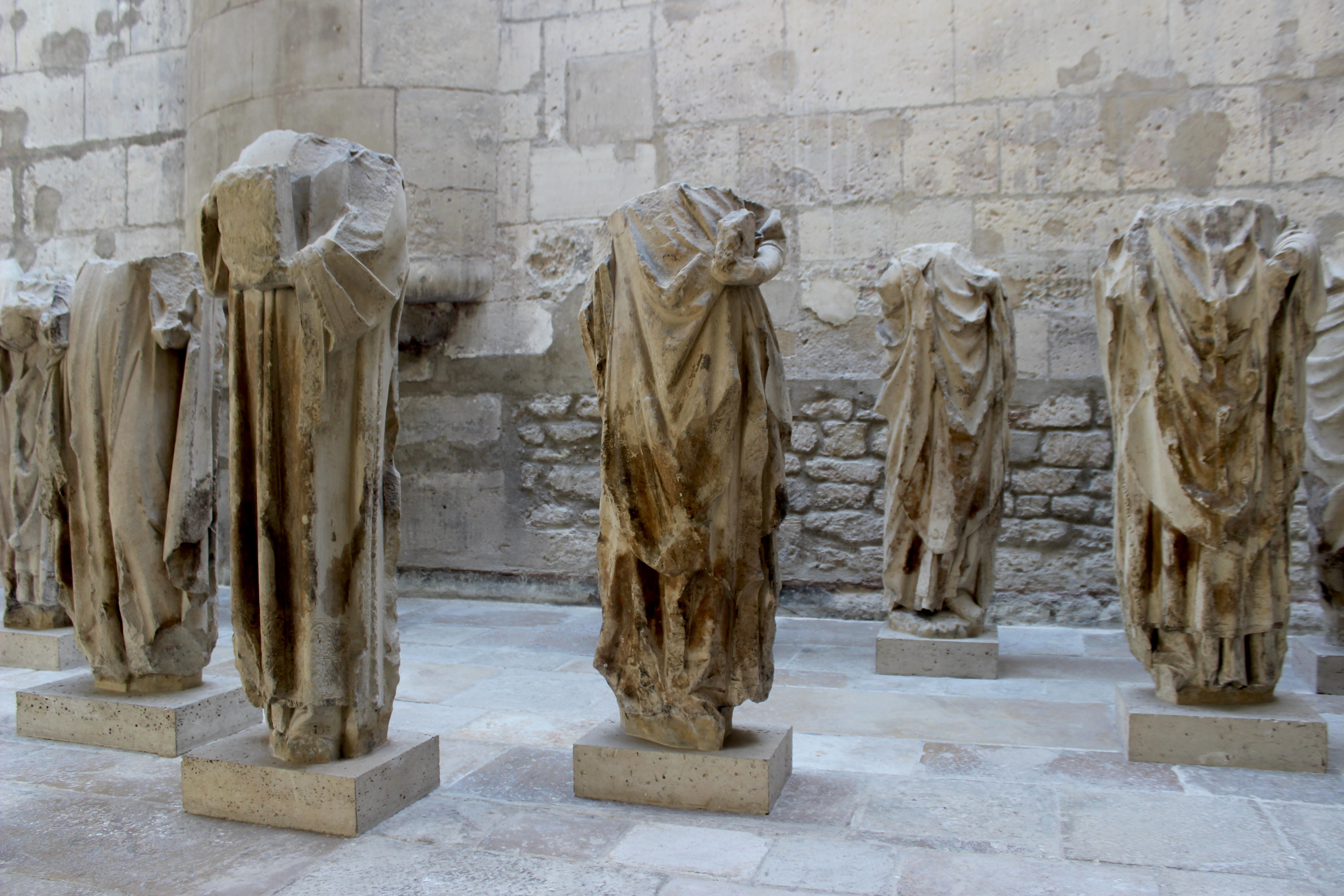
Statues of kings from Notre Dame, decapitated during the French Revolution (1793), now in Musée de Cluny, Paris.

==== Notre Dame ====
The famous Notre Dame de Paris was vandalized heavily as it was a strong symbol of the Church. Many religious artifacts were looted or desecrated once the cathedral’s treasury was broken into. Sacred vessels and items used in liturgical ceremonies were targeted for looting; they often adorned jewels and were made out of precious metals. Other precious relics associated with historical saints and figures were destroyed. One such example is the statue of Notre-Dame-Sous-Terre, which was burnt. Externally, the 28 statues of biblical kings located on the Western side of the cathedral were mistaken for French kings and subsequently beheaded. This is a classic example of an iconoclastic act meant to symbolically silence the monarchical power in France. The roofing of the Notre-Dame was also torn apart by the mobs to manufacture bullets as it was made of lead. This allowed rain to pass through the cathedral’s roof and ultimately added to the damage of the interior.

==== Basilica of Saint Denis ====
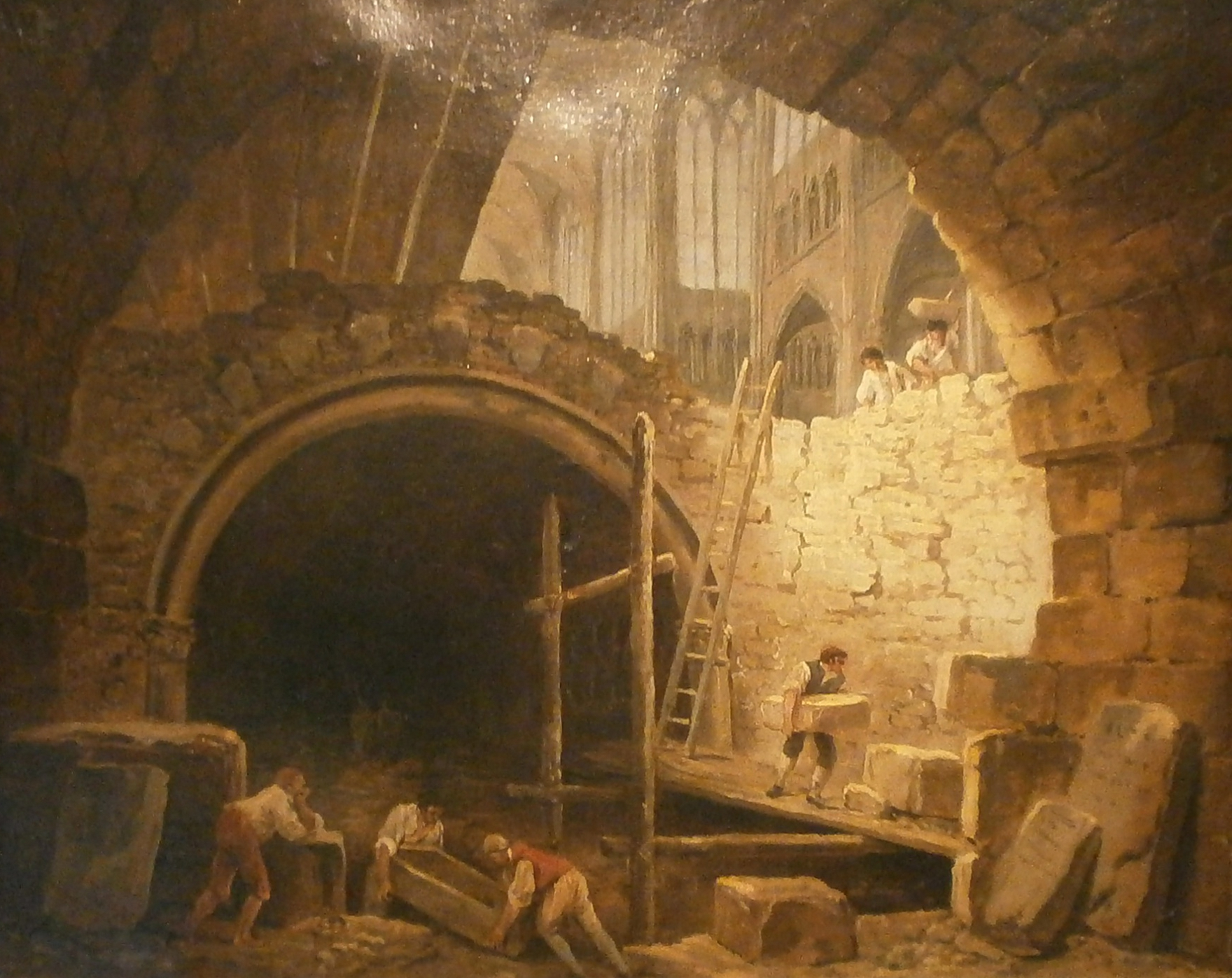
Painted by Hubert Robert, this work depicts the looting of the royal tombs in the Basilica of Saint-Denis during the French Revolution in October 1793.

The French Royal church was used as a hay barn during the French Revolution. Its stained glass windows were stolen, either to be sold, smashed, or repurposed for weaponry for the revolutionaries. It is said that the relics inside were discarded into a local dump. Most notably, Saint Denis was a well-known burial site for royalty. The tombs of former kings and queens were dug up, pillaged, and destroyed. The desecration of tombs was an act of iconoclasm that targeted the physical bodies of the monarchy.

==== Other cathedrals ====
Other cathedrals that were destroyed or looted include: Mâcon, Avranches, Boulogne-sur-Mer, Soissons, Laon, Reims, Angers, and more.

== Public space name and design changes ==
- The Place Louis XV ("Louis XV Square") became the Place de la Revolution ("Revolution Square"). This was done at the same time as the statue of Louis XIV was taken down. This was a public display of iconoclasm to protest the monarchy.
- The Place Dauphine became the Place Thionville to recognize the defense of Thionville against the Prussian army.
- Many street names were changed due to their name’s correlation with royal families:
  - Rue Royale became Rue de la Revolution
  - Rue de Richelieu became Rue de la Loi
  - Rue des Capucines became Rue de la Liberté
