= Régis Dericquebourg =

French sociologist of religions

- Born: 1947 (age 78–79)
- Occupation: Writer
- Known for: New Religious Movements researcher

Academic background
- Education: Doctorate in psychology
- Thesis: Les Témoins de Jéhovah dans le Nord de la France. Dynamique d'un groupe religieux minoritaire et rapports à l'institution (1979)
- Doctoral advisor: Jean Seguy

Academic work
- Discipline: sociology psychology
- Institutions: Charles de Gaulle University – Lille III
- Main interests: sociology of religion
- Notable works: Les Religions de guérison

Régis Dericquebourg (born 1947) is a French sociologist of religions. He was an associate professor at the Charles de Gaulle University – Lille III and is now associate professor at the Faculty for Comparative Study of Religions and Humanism in Wilrijk. He is a permanent member of the CNRS Group on the Sociology of Religions and Secularism. He is also a member of Human Rights Without Frontiers International, a Belgian organization that advocates for new religious movements.

== Life ==
=== Education ===
Dericquebourg studied psychology at the University of Lille. He holds a doctorate in psychosociology with his thesis (1979) on Jehovah's Witnesses entitled Les Témoins de Jéhovah dans le Nord de la France. Dynamique d'un groupe religieux minoritaire et rapports à l'institution at the École pratique des hautes études (EPHE-Sorbonne), under the direction of Jean Seguy. He holds a postgraduate degree DESS (Diplôme d'études supérieures spécialisées) in clinical psychology from the Paris Diderot University.

== Research ==
He then turned to the study of religious movements that practice spiritual healing (Antoinism, Christian Science, Church of Scientology, Invitation to Life, Universal Alliance), and has published articles and a book about them. Although some of these movements have been considered sects, he prefers to speak of healing churches.

He published five books, many sociological articles in collective books, encyclopedias, and journals and regularly participated in conferences of sociology. His contributions are mainly on Jehovah's Witnesses, healing in religion, and new religious movements.

One of Dericquebourg's main contributions to the sociology of religions is the creation of a new category of religions, "religions de guérison" (healing-oriented religions). This category should avoid the debates about which movements are genuine religions and which are cults by focusing on healing as the main feature, and reason of success, for a number of religions very different between each other. In his 1988 book Les Religions de guérison, Dericquebourg proposed the category based on his analysis of Christian Science, Scientology, Antoinism and Invitation to Life, claiming that seeking healing is the main motivation for joining all these four groups.

== Main works ==
- Les Religions de guérison, 1988, Paris : Cerf ISBN 978-2204029841
- Les Antoinistes, 1993, Paris-Turnhout : Brépols (ISBN 2-503-50325-X)
- La Christian Science, 1999, Leumann, Torino: Elledici ISBN 978-8801014310
- Croire et guérir — Quatre religions de guérison, 2001, Paris : Dervy ISBN 2-84454-076-7
- Ces protestants qu’on dit Adventistes, with Fabrice Desplan, 2008, Paris : L'Harmattan ISBN 978-2-296-06838-4
- Georges Roux dit "le Christ de Montfavet". Ecologisme, ésotérisme et guérison, 2012, Bruxelles: E.M.E. ISBN 978-2806607805
