= Bouhier =

Bouhier is a French surname. Notable people with the name include:

- Cinthia Bouhier (born 1979), French former synchronized swimmer
- Claude Bouhier de Lantenay (1681–1755), second bishop of Dijon
- Jean Bouhier (jurist) (1673–1746), président à mortier to the Parlement de Bourgogne and writer
- Jean Bouhier (bishop) (1666–1743), first bishop of Dijon
