= Archdiocese of Dijon =

Catholic archdiocese in France

Coordinates: 47.3188°N 5.0412°E

Archdiocese of Dijon Archidioecesis Divionensis Archidiocèse de Dijon

Catholic
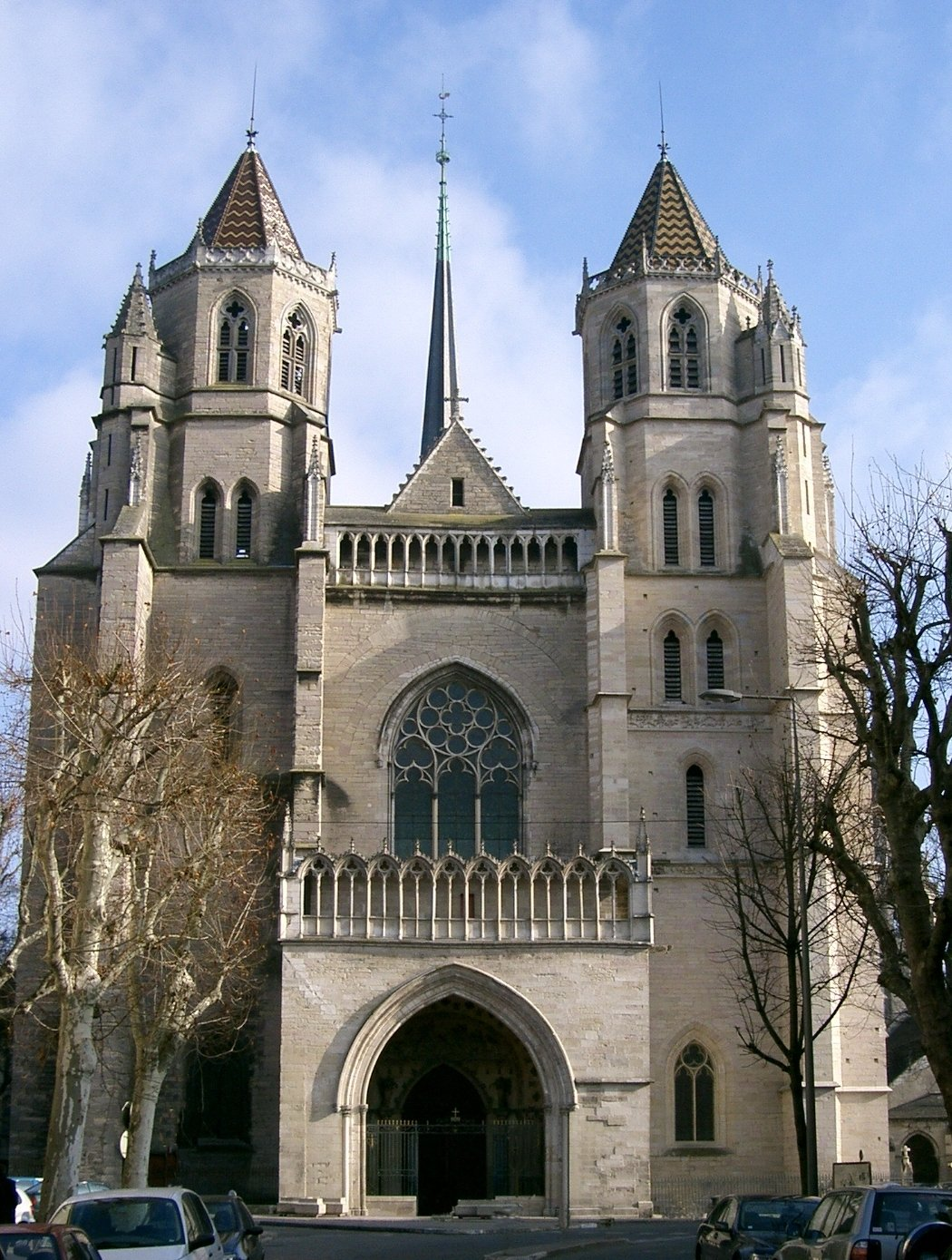
- Dijon Cathedral

Location
- Country: France
- Ecclesiastical province: Dijon

Statistics
- Area: 8,760 km^{2} (3,380 sq mi)
- Population: Total; Catholics: (as of 2021); 533,430; 340,270 (63.8%)
- Parishes: 60 'new parishes'

Information
- Denomination: Roman Catholic
- Sui iuris church: Latin Church
- Rite: Roman Rite
- Established: 9 April 1731 (As Diocese of Dijon); 8 December 2002 (As Archdiocese of Dijon)
- Cathedral: Cathedral of St. Benignus of Dijon
- Patron saint: St. Benignus of Dijon
- Secular priests: 103 (diocesan); 51 (Religious Orders); 40 Permanent Deacon

Current leadership
- Pope: Leo XIV
- Metropolitan Archbishop: Antoine Hérouard
- Suffragans: Archdiocese of Sens; Diocese of Autun; Diocese of Nevers; Territorial Prelature of Mission de France
- Bishops emeritus: Roland Minnerath

Map

Website
- Website of the Archdiocese

Ecclesiastical province of Dijon

The Archdiocese of Dijon (Latin: Archidioecesis Divionensis; French: Archidiocèse de Dijon) is a Latin diocese of the Catholic Church in France. The archepiscopal see is Dijon Cathedral, which is located in the city of Dijon. The diocese comprises the entire department of Côte-d'Or, in the Region of Bourgogne. Originally established as the Diocese of Dijon in 1731, and suffragan to the Archdiocese of Lyon, the diocese was elevated to the rank of archdiocese in 2002. The most significant jurisdiction change occurred after the Concordat of 1801, when the diocese annexed the department of Haute-Marne. In 1821, a papal bull re-established the Diocese of Langres. Since 2022 the archbishop has been Antoine Hérouard.

== History ==
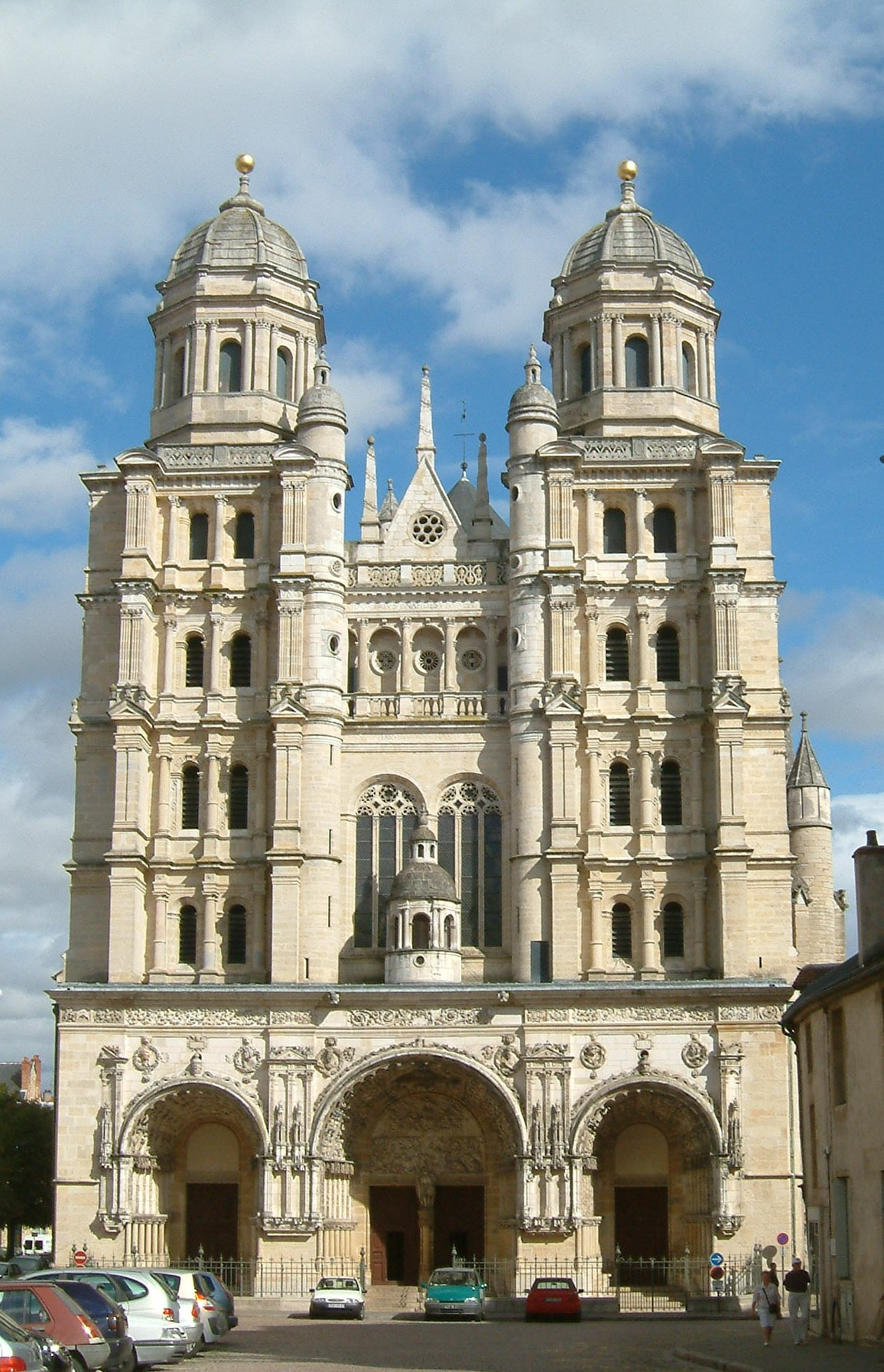
Church of Saint Michel, Dijon

=== Myths ===
Between the years 506 and 540, it was revealed to Gregory, Bishop of Langres, an ancestor of Gregory of Tours, that a tomb which the piety of the peasants led them to visit contained the remains of St. Benignus. He had a large basilica erected over it, and soon travellers from Italy brought him the acts of this saint's martyrdom. These acts are part of a collection of documents according to which Burgundy was evangelized in the 2nd century by St. Benignus, an Asiatic priest and the disciple of St. Polycarp, assisted by two ecclesiastics, Andochius and Thyrsus. The good work is said to have prospered at Autun, where it received valuable support from the youthful Symphorianus; at Saulieu where Andochius and Thyrsus had established themselves; at Langres where the three brothers, Speusippus, Eleusippus, and Meleusippus, were baptized, and finally at Dijon. In the meantime the persecution of Marcus Aurelius broke out, and St. Benignus and his companions were put to death.

The doubts first raised by Boulliau and Tillemont in the 17th century concerning the authenticity of these acts seem justified by the conclusions of G. Van Hooff and Louis Duchesne, according to which the Acts of St. Benignus and the martyrdom of the three brothers of Langres, on which the aforesaid traditions are based, are apocryphal and copied from Cappadocian legends. Animated polemics arose among the scholars of France on the apostolate of St. Benignus.

=== Langres and Dijon ===
Under the Merovingians and Carolingians, most of the bishops of Langres resided at Dijon, e.g. St. Urbanus (5th century), St. Gregory, and St. Tetricus (6th century), who were buried there. When, in 1016, Lambert, Bishop of Langres, ceded the seigniory and county of Dijon to King Robert of France, the Bishops of Langres made Langres their place of residence.

=== Diocese ===
In 1731, Pope Clement XII made Dijon a diocese. When formed, it was composed of 164 parishes divided among seven regional deaneries. 155 of these parishes had been part of the Diocese of Langres, and 19 others had come from the Diocese of Besançon. The seven deaneries were supervised by the two archdeacons. The Abbey of Saint-Etienne of Dijon (5th century) long had a Chapter of Canons Regular who observed the Rule of St. Augustine; the Chapter was altered to one of secular canons by Pope Paul V in 1611, and Pope Clement XI made its church the cathedral of Dijon; during the Revolution the cathedral was transformed into a forage storehouse. The former abbatial church of Saint-Bénigne became the cathedral of Dijon early in the 19th century. From the 1730s the Chapter was composed of six dignities and twelve Canons. The city of Dijon had some 30,000 inhabitants, and was divided into seven parishes. There were two colleges for the education of the young, along with eight houses of male religious, and eight monasteries of men.

=== Revolution ===
The diocese of Dijon was abolished during the French Revolution by the Legislative Assembly, under the Civil Constitution of the Clergy (1790). Its territory was subsumed into the new diocese, called 'Côte-d'Or ', which was part of the Metropolitanate called the 'Metropole de l'Est' (which included eight new 'départements'). The Civil Constitution mandated that bishops be elected by the citizens of each 'département', which immediately raised the most severe canonical questions, since the electors did not need to be Catholics and the approval of the Pope was not only not required, but actually forbidden. Erection of new dioceses and transfer of bishops, moreover, was not canonically within the competence of civil authorities or of the Church in France. The result was schism between the 'Constitutional Church' and the Catholic Church. The legitimate bishop of Dijon, René de Mérinville, refused to take the oath, and therefore the episcopal see was declared vacant. He was in fact one of the thirty bishops who subscribed to the Exposition des principes, sur la Constitution civile du Clergé (30 October 1790). He emigrated to Germany and took up residence at Karlsruhe.

On 15 February 1791 the electors of 'Côte-d'Or' were assembled, and elected the former Jesuit Jean-Baptise Volfius, whose brother was a member of the Constituent Assembly, as their president; they then proceeded to elect him as their bishop. Volfius travelled to Paris for his consecration, which was carried out on 13 March by Jean-Baptiste Gobel, the Bishop of Lydda in partibus, who had just been installed as Constitutional Bishop of Paris. Volfius, and all the Constitutional Bishops, were required to resign in May 1801 by First Consul Bonaparte, who was negotiating with Pope Pius VII the Concordat of 1801 (15 July 1801). Once the Concordat went into effect, Pius VII was able to issue the appropriate bulls to restore many of the dioceses and to regulate their boundaries, most of which corresponded closely to the new 'départements'. The Bull Qui Christi Domini created the Diocese of Dijon out of the two 'départements' of Côte-d'Or and Haute-Marne. The diocese of Langres was reestablished in principle in 1817, but difficulties between the King and the Pope postponed the implementation of Langres until 1823.

=== Separation of Church and State ===
Pope Pius X's request in 1904 for the resignation of Albert-Léon-Marie Le Nordez, Bishop of Dijon since 1899, was one of the incidents which led to the Law of Separation of 1905 and the rupture of relations between France and the Holy See.

== Bishops ==
- Jean Bouhier (1731–1743)
- Claude Bouhier (1743–1755)
- Claude-Marc-Antoine d'Apchon (1755–1776)
- Jacques-Joseph-François de Vogüé (1776–1787)
- René des Monstiers de Mérinville (1787–1790) (1801)
  - Jean-Baptiste Volfius (1791–1793) (Constitutional Bishop of Côte-d-Or).
- Henri Reymond (1802–1820)
- Jean-Baptiste Dubois (1820–1822)
- Jean-François Martin de Boisville (1822–1829)
- Jacques Raillon (1829–1830) (also Archbishop of Aix)
- Claude Rey (1831–1838)
- François-Victor Rivet (1838–1884)
- Jean-Pierre-Bernard Castillon (1885–1885)
- Victor-Lucien-Sulpice Lécot (1886–1890) (later Archbishop of Bordeaux)
- Fédéric-Henri Oury (1890–1898) (later Archbishop of Algiers)
- Albert-Léon-Marie Le Nordez (1898–1904)
- Pierre Dadolle (1906–1911)
- Jacques-Louis Monestès (1911–1915)
- Maurice Landrieux (1915–1926)
- Pierre-André-Charles Petit de Julleville (1927–1936) (also Archbishop of Rouen)
- Guillaume-Marius Sembel (1937–1964)
- André-Jean-Marie Charles de la Brousse (1964–1974)
- Albert Florent Augustin Decourtray (1974–1981) (also Archbishop of Lyon)
- Jean Marie Julien Balland (1982–1988) (also Archbishop of Reims)
- Michel Coloni (1989–2004)
- Roland Minnerath (2004–2022)
- Antoine Hérouard (2022–present)

== Architecture ==
Romanesque architecture was very popular in Burgundy; its masterpiece is the Cathedral of Saint-Bénigne of Dijon, consecrated by Paschal II in 1106 and completed in 1288. The Gothic style, although less used, characterizes the churches of Notre-Dame de Dijon (1252–1334), Notre-Dame de Semur, and l'Abbaye Saint-Seine; it was also the style of the Sainte-Chapelle of Dijon, which is no longer in existence. Under the dukes of Burgundy, at the close of the 14th and beginning of the 15th century, Burgundian art flourished in a surprising degree. The Chartreuse de Champmol, on which Philip the Bold had Claus Sluter, the sculptor, at work from 1389 to 1406, and which was the acme of artistic excellence, was almost totally destroyed during the Revolution; however, two superb traces of it may still be seen, namely the Puits des prophètes and the portal of the church. The Beaune hospital (1443) is a fine specimen of the Gothic style, and the church of Saint-Michel in Dijon (1497) has 16th- and 17th-century porches covered with fantastic bas-reliefs. The Abbeys of Cîteaux, Fontenay, and Flavigny (where in the 19th century Jean-Baptiste Henri Lacordaire installed a Dominican novitiate) were all within the territory of Dijon.

== Saints ==
The following saints are specially honoured:

- Sequanus (Saint Seine), b. at Mesmont, Côte-d'Or, d. 580, founder of the monastery of Réomé around which sprang up the town of Saint-Seine-l'Abbaye
- William of Volpiano (961–1031), a native of Novara, Abbot of Saint Bénigne at Dijon in 990, and reformer of the Benedictine Order in the 11th century;
- Robert of Molesme, joint founder with Alberic of Cîteaux and Stephen Harding of the monastery of Cîteaux in 1098
- Stephen Harding, who died in 1134, third Abbot of Cîteaux, under whose administration the monasteries of La Ferté Abbey, Pontigny, Clairvaux, and Morimond were established
- Bernard of Clairvaux (1090–1153)
- Jane Frances de Chantal (1572–1641), b. at Dijon, who, having heard Francis de Sales's Lenten discourses at Dijon in 1604, conceived a friendship for him
- Bénigne Joly, canon of Saint-Etienne de Dijon (17th century)
- Marguerite du Saint-Sacrement (1619–48), surnamed the "little saint of Beaune", noted for having visions of the Infant Jesus, in consequence of which the pious association known as the Family of the Holy Child Jesus was organized and later raised by Pope Pius IX to the dignity of an archconfraternity.

Among the famous persons of Dijon the Seneschal Philippe Pot (1428–94) is remembered for his exploits against the Turks in 1452 and his deliverance from his captors. Bossuet was a native of Dijon. Hubert Languet, the Protestant publicist (1518–81), was born at Vitteaux.

== See also ==
- Catholic Church in France

== Sources ==
=== Reference Works ===
- Gams, Pius Bonifatius (1873). Series episcoporum Ecclesiae catholicae: quotquot innotuerunt a beato Petro apostolo. Ratisbon: Typis et Sumptibus Georgii Josephi Manz. pp. 548–549. (Use with caution; obsolete)
- Ritzler, Remigius; Sefrin, Pirminus (1958). Hierarchia catholica medii et recentis aevi VI (1730-1799). Patavii: Messagero di S. Antonio. p. 284. (in Latin)
- Ritzler, Remigius; Sefrin, Pirminus (1968). Hierarchia Catholica medii et recentioris aevi sive summorum pontificum, S. R. E. cardinalium, ecclesiarum antistitum series... A pontificatu Pii PP. VII (1800) usque ad pontificatum Gregorii PP. XVI (1846) (in Latin). Vol. VII. Monasterii: Libr. Regensburgiana.
- Remigius Ritzler; Pirminus Sefrin (1978). Hierarchia catholica Medii et recentioris aevi... A Pontificatu PII PP. IX (1846) usque ad Pontificatum Leonis PP. XIII (1903) (in Latin). Vol. VIII. Il Messaggero di S. Antonio.
- Pięta, Zenon (2002). Hierarchia catholica medii et recentioris aevi... A pontificatu Pii PP. X (1903) usque ad pontificatum Benedictii PP. XV (1922) (in Latin). Vol. IX. Padua: Messagero di San Antonio. ISBN 978-88-250-1000-8.

=== Studies ===
- Duchesne, Louis (1910). Fastes épiscopaux de l'ancienne Gaule: II. L'Aquitaine et les Lyonnaises. Paris: Fontemoing.
- Jean, Armand (1891). Les évêques et les archevêques de France depuis 1682 jusqu'à 1801 (in French). Paris: A. Picard.
- Pisani, Paul (1907). Répertoire biographique de l'épiscopat constitutionnel (1791-1802) (in French). Paris: A. Picard et fils.
- Société bibliographique (France) (1907). L'épiscopat français depuis le Concordat jusqu'à la Séparation (1802-1905). Paris: Librairie des Saints-Pères.
- Sautereau, Philibert-Bernard (1885). L'évêché de Dijon et ses évêques (in French). Citeaux: Imprimerie et librairie.
