= Jean Bouhier =

Jean Bouhier may refer to:

- Jean Bouhier (bishop) (1666–1744), first bishop of Dijon
- Jean Bouhier (jurist) (1673–1746), président à mortier to the Parlement de Bourgogne and writer
