= Abbey of Saint-Seine =

Former Benedictine monastery in Saint-Seine-l'Abbaye, Côte-d'Or, Burgundy, France

Coordinates: 47.4399°N 4.7898°E

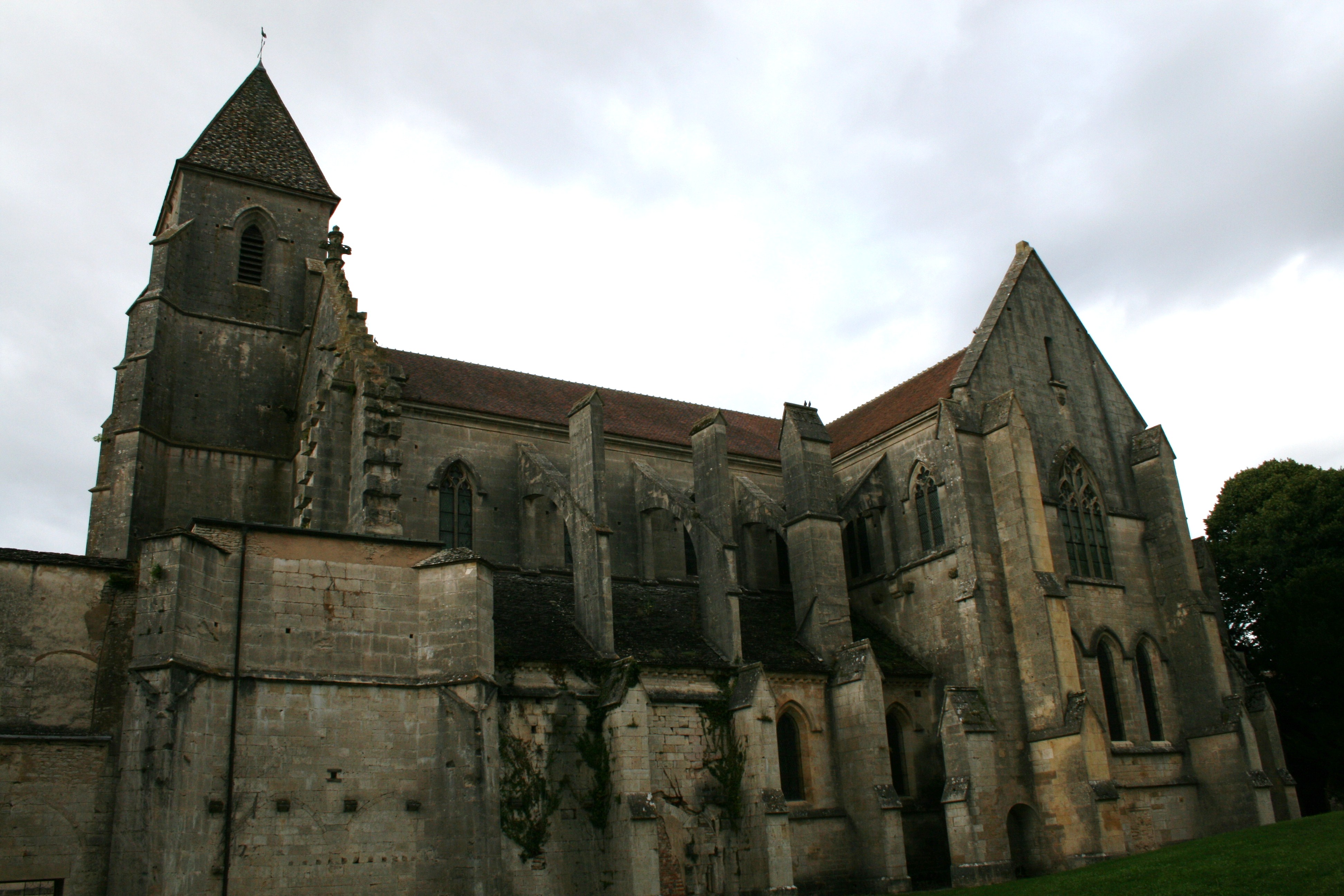
Church of the former abbey

The Abbey of Saint-Seine (French: Abbaye de Saint-Seine) is a former Benedictine monastery located in Saint-Seine-l'Abbaye, Côte-d'Or, Burgundy, France. During the Middle Ages it was a wealthy and powerful institution. It was suppressed at the French Revolution.

== History ==
The abbey took its name from Sigo, a monk from the Abbey of Saint-Jean-de-Réome at Moutiers-Saint-Jean. Sigo, a son of the Count of Mesmont, withdrew from the world into the heart of the forest of Cestres on his family lands, in the territory of the present commune of Saint-Seine-l'Abbaye. His sanctity attracted followers, and eventually the community became a monastery, known at first as the Abbaye Sainte-Marie de Cestres, or Cestres Abbey. In time, the town of Saint-Seine(-l'Abbaye) grew up round the monastery.

After Sigo's death in 581, his name gradually changed to "Soigne", then "Seigne", and finally "Saint Seine", apparently under the influence of the nearby sources of the River Seine.

In the 8th century the great reformer Saint Benedict of Aniane made his profession and became a monk at Saint-Seine. He practised a rigorous asceticism and studied the various monastic rules then in use, including the Rules of Saint Pachomius, Saint Basil the Great and Saint Columbanus. He became the abbey's cellarer. In about 780 the community elected him abbot, but against his will, and he fled to Aniane, near Montpellier.

== Architecture ==
=== Church ===
The abbey church was built in 1225 by the Abbot Olivier, but destroyed by fire in 1255. The buildings were not reconstructed until the 14th and 15th centuries by the abbots Jean de Blaisy and Pierre de Fontenette. The Gothic church is almost all that survives of the abbey buildings. The nave consists of four bays, with side chapels. The west front, comprising a porch between two towers, is of the 15th century, as are the 22 frescoes in the choir depicting the life of Saint Seine, while the choir stalls are of the 18th century.

The church was listed as a monument historique in 1862.

=== Cloister ===
A new cloister was built in 1475 under the abbot Pierre de Fontenette to harmonise with the other conventual buildings.

== Gallery ==
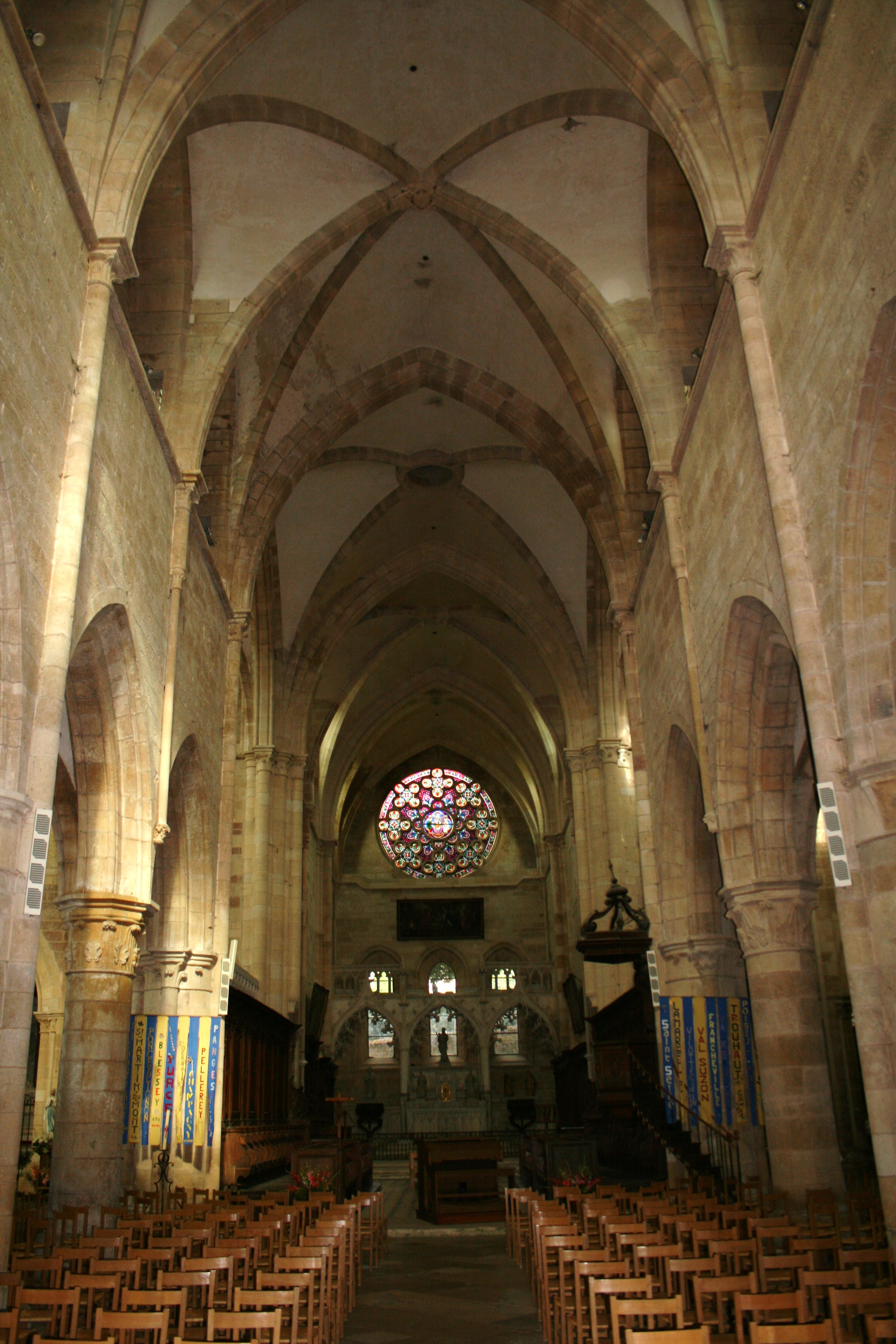
Nave

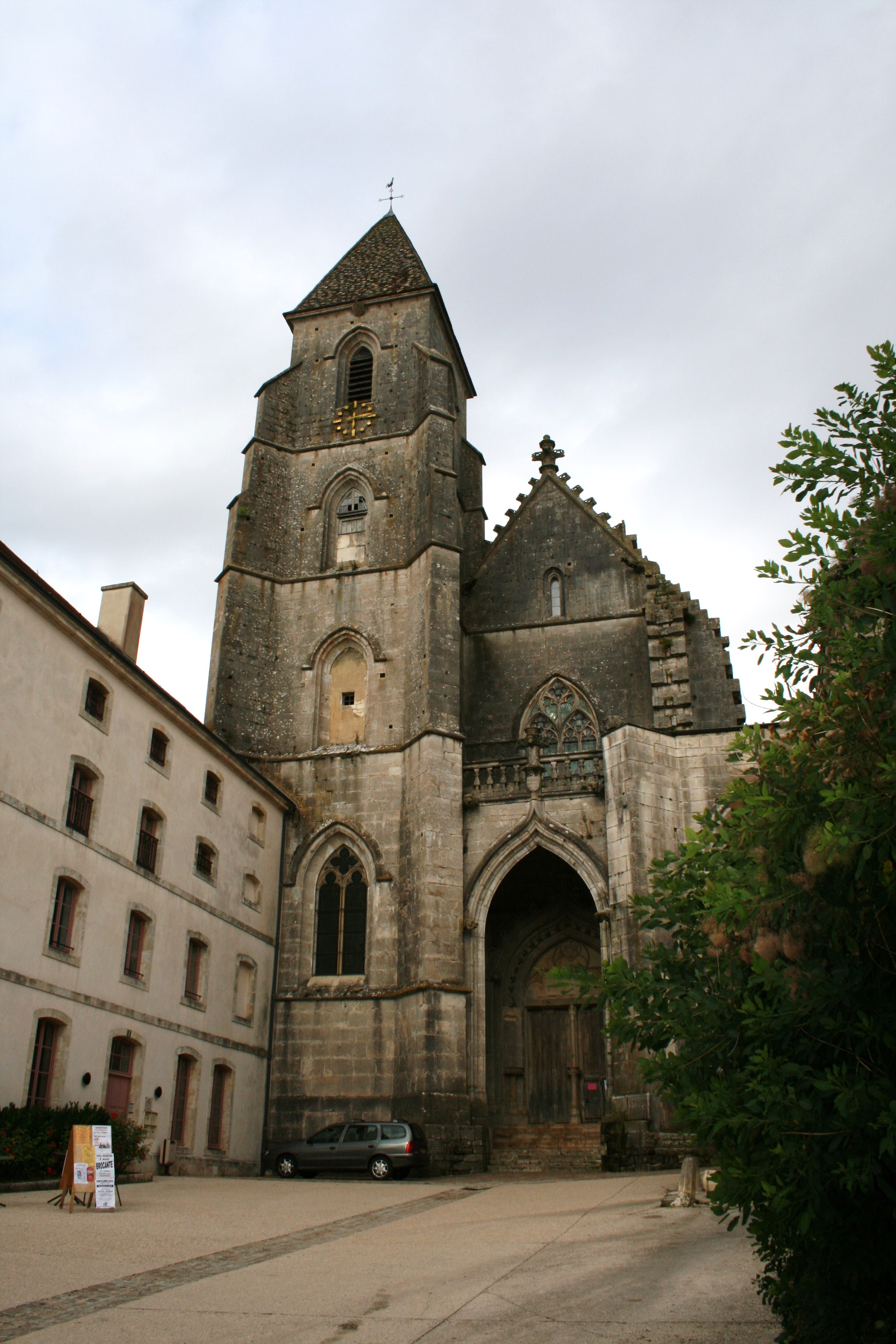
West front

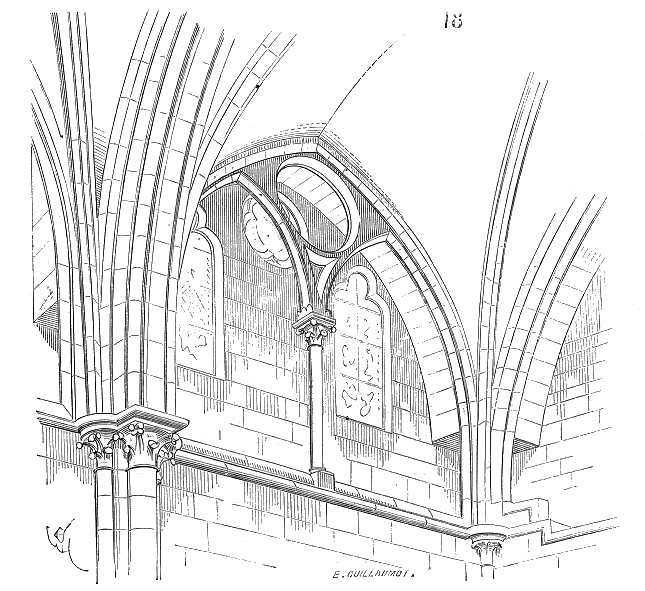
Triforium: drawing by Eugène Viollet-le-Duc

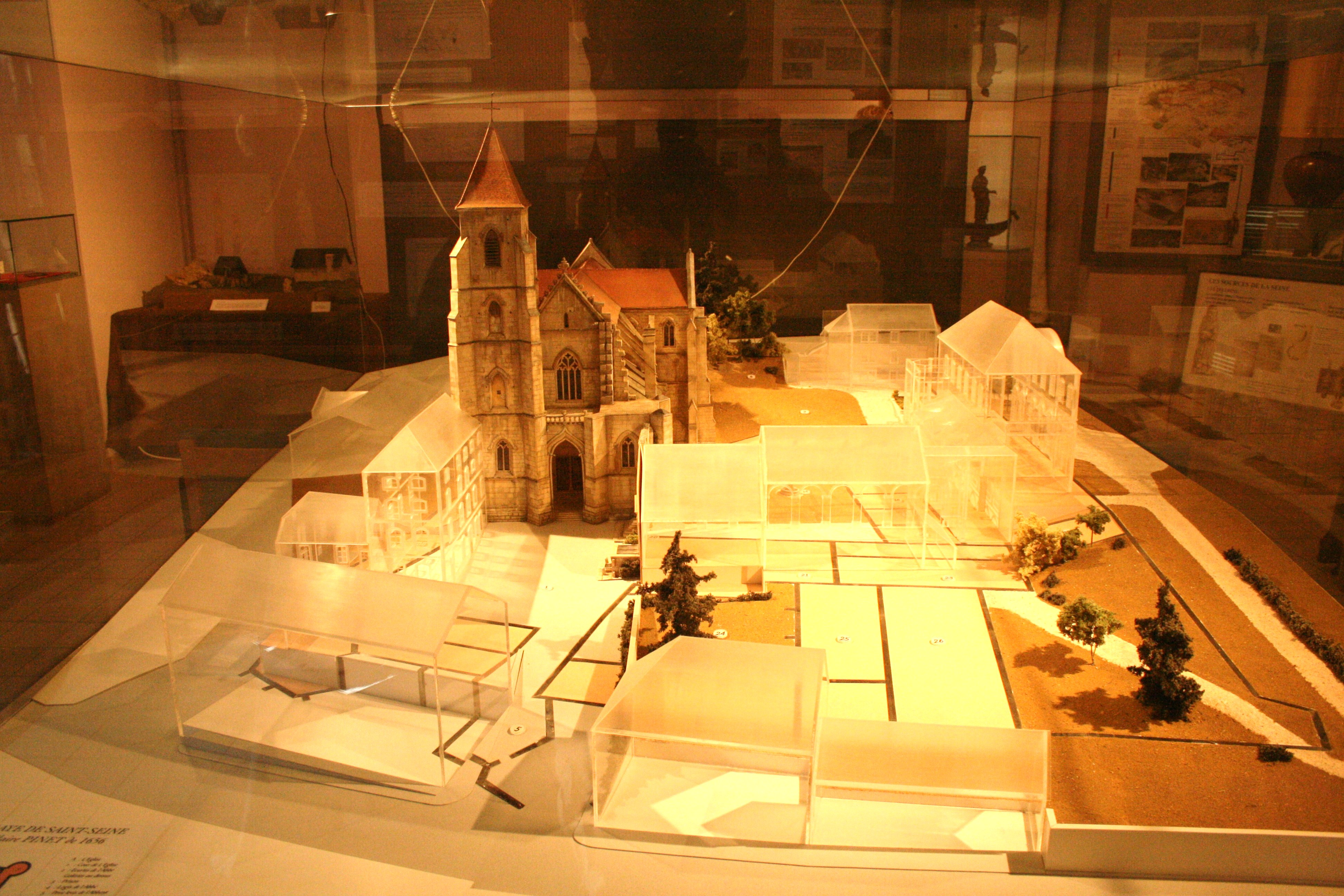
Model of the former abbey

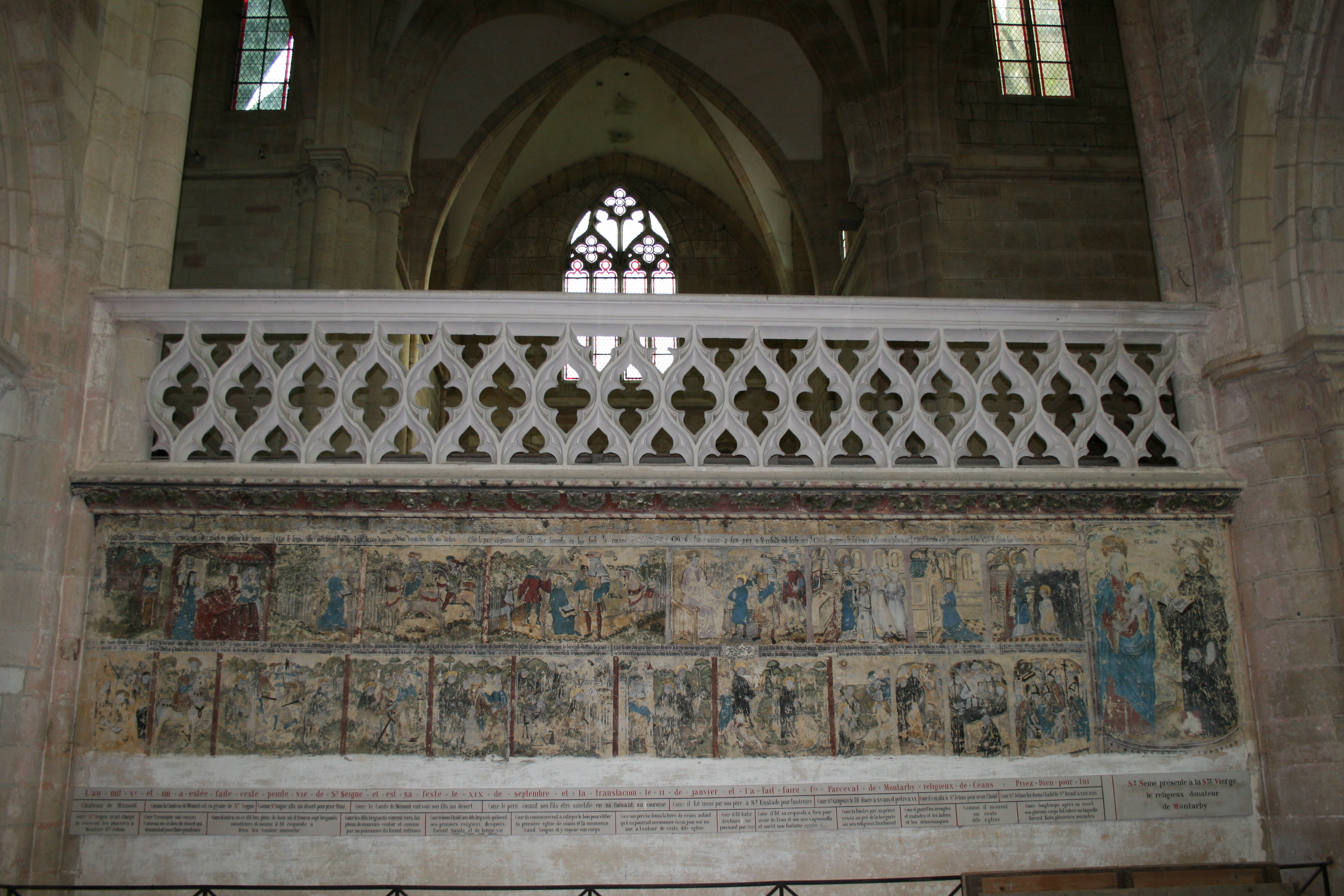
Frescoes of the life of Saint Seine
