= Political culture of France =

The political culture in France, as of the beginning of the 21st century, can be summed up by the people's main expectations for governments to ensure a degree of social welfare. France exhibits labour protections and democracy with a multiparty system dominated by conservative, social-liberal and social democratic forces, with a strong influence of nationalist, socialist, and Green parties. Coalition governments are uncommon, similar to the United Kingdom.

The system of government of France is a semi-presidential one, even though it may be seen as presidential since the legislative elections usually happen after the presidential elections, which allows a president to hold a legislative majority, thus the President of the Republic has many powers. Some parties, such as La France Insoumise, qualify the system as a "presidential monarchy."

As the President has many powers and is elected directly, all eyes are turned on him/her and s/he is usually held accountable. The President of the Republic is usually unpopular, because s/he is often seen as accountable, and strikes, or sometimes the establishment of movements against the government, are common.

== Factors which have shaped the culture ==
- Geography: France is surrounded by several countries, including the United Kingdom and Germany.
- Religion: France had been dominated by the Catholic Church, but since the 1905 French law on the Separation of the Churches and the State, the French government's policy has been based on Laïcité, one of the constitution's principles.
- History: The democracy in France started with a revolution and evolved through a series of protests.
- Sociology: France's conversion early on, compared to neighbouring states, away from a rural and agricultural society and into an urban and industrial country.
