= Mathieu Marais =

French jurist and lawyer

- Born: 11 October 1665; Paris, France
- Died: 21 June 1737 (aged 71); Paris, France
- Occupations: jurist, lawyer and memorialist
- Writing career
- Language: French
- Period: Régence and firsts years of King Louis XV reign
- Genre: Memoir

Mathieu Marais (bapt. 11 October 1665, Paris-21 June 1737, Paris) was a French jurist and lawyer at the Parlement of Paris. He is later known by the edition of his Journal and Memoirs by Mathurin de Lescures.

== Life ==
Mathieu Marais was born in Paris, in the rue du Bouloi. His baptismal certificate was dated of October 11, 1665 at the Church of St Eustache of Paris. Because of the high infant mortality, infants were baptized the same day or a few days after their birth, so his date of birth is conjectured to be October 10. His father was Renault Marais, prosecutor at the Grand Châtelet, and his mother was Catherine-Françoise Billon. His godparents were Mathieu Billon, Parisian bourgeois, and Claude Billon, daughter of Guillaume Billon, the King's candlemaker.

He spent twelve years with the Jesuits, then became a lawyer on November 22, 1688 before retiring in 1736 and he ended his career as bâtonnier. He was often mistaked with Jean Marais (or Marays). His nickname was "the lawyer of the women" (l'avocat des dames), because he pleaded for a lot of them. He aspired to French Academy. He was very fond of Jean de La Fontaine, and the wrote an Histoire de la vie et des ouvrages de M. de La Fontaine (History of The Life and Works of Mr. de La Fontaine) published in 1811 by Simon Chardon de La Rochette. He was in contact with several personalities of his time, including Nicolas Boileau, the Chancellor d'Aguesseau, the Cardinal Polignac, the Viscount Charles-Henri-Gaspard de Saulx of Tavannes, and also the financier Samuel Bernard.

His greatest friend seems to have been president Bouhier to whom he, sick and dying, sent a letter on February 1, 1737, where are written journals of his hand; he recommends keeping them in his library of manuscripts so that they do not fall into the wrong hands. He would have contributed to the Mercure galant for the criticism of Madame de Lambert about Mr. de Sacy's translation of Panegyric of Trajan by Pliny the Younger. As a friend of Pierre Bayle, he collaborated at the Historical and Critical Dictionary by writing the articles Henry III, Henry, Duke of Guise and Margaret, Queen of Navarre among others. His funeral took place at the same St Eustache Church where he was baptized.
