= Michel Coloni =

His Excellency Michel Louis Coloni
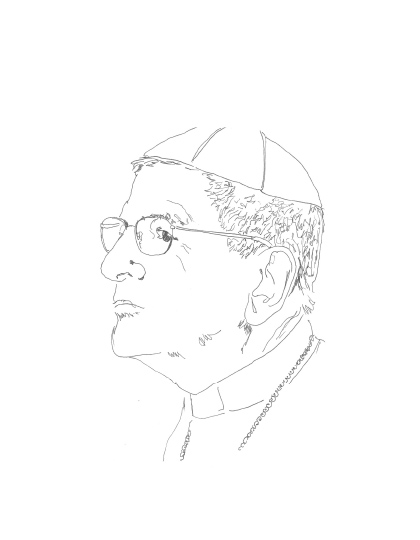
- Michel L. Coloni 1927-2016, drawn by Ursula Wieland
- Church: Roman Catholic
- Appointed: 11 May 1982
- In office: 1982-2016

Orders
- Ordination: 29 June 1953 by Emile-Arsène Blanchet
- Consecration: 8 October 1982 by Jean-Marie Lustiger
- Rank: Bishop

Personal details
- Born: August 25, 1927 Paris France
- Died: July 6, 2016 (aged 88) Tivernon

Michel Louis Coloni (25 August 1927 – 6 July 2016) was a Catholic bishop.

Ordained to the priesthood in 1954, Coloni was named auxiliary bishop of the Archdiocese of Paris, France and titular of Oea, in 1982. In 1989, he was named bishop of the Roman Catholic Diocese of Dijon. From 2002 until 2004, he served as archbishop of the Archdiocese of Dijon.
