= Concordat in Alsace–Moselle =

Law regarding religion in part of France

In the local law in Alsace-Moselle, the Concordat is a remnant of the Napoleonic Concordat of 1801. The 1801 Concordat was abrogated in the rest of France by the law of 1905 on the separation of church and state. However, at the time, Alsace-Moselle had been annexed by Germany, so the Concordat remained in force in these areas. The Concordat recognises four religious traditions in Alsace-Moselle: three branches of Christianity (Catholicism, Lutheranism and Reformed) plus Judaism. Therefore, the French concept of laïcité, a rigid separation of church and state, does not apply in this region.

Several French governments have considered repealing the Concordat, but none has done so. On 21 February 2013, the Constitutional Council of France upheld the Concordat, reaffirming its validity, in response to an appeal from a secularist group which claimed that the Concordat in Alsace-Moselle contradicted the secular nature of the French Republic.

== Religious education ==
Under the Concordat, religious education is compulsory in public schools, at both primary and secondary level, although parents can now opt for a secular equivalent by a written request. These religious education lessons are given by members of the faiths concerned and under the control of the respective churches.

== Ministers ==
Religious ministers in Alsace-Moselle (pastors, priests and rabbis of the four recognised faiths) receive a salary from the Interior Ministry, which, by virtue of the 1993 Lang-Cloupet agreement, is linked to civil service salary scales. In 2012, this was said to be costing the French state 54 million euros per year. They also qualify for unemployment benefits. The Bishop of Metz and the Archbishop of Strasbourg are appointed by decree of the President of the Republic, after agreement with the Holy See. The actual involvement of the French state is however nowadays considered purely nominal (although a recent appointment to the see of Metz was blocked at an early stage). Chief rabbis and presidents of the Jewish and Protestant consistories are appointed by the Prime Minister. Ministers of the three Christian churches are appointed by the Interior Minister.

== Theology faculties ==
The University of Strasbourg includes two faculties of theology, one Protestant, the other Catholic. These are the only theology faculties in France, although the University of Lorraine in Metz also has a theology department. Both faculties are responsible for training ministers for their respective religious traditions. The Catholic faculty comes directly under the authority of the Holy See, and the diplomas that it awards are recognised by the Holy See as canonical.

== Other religions and religious traditions ==
There have been a number of attempts to extend the coverage of the Concordat to recognise other religions, notably Islam, as well as other branches of Christianity.
