= Albert-Léon-Marie Le Nordez =

French bishop (1844–1922)

- Bishop of Dijon
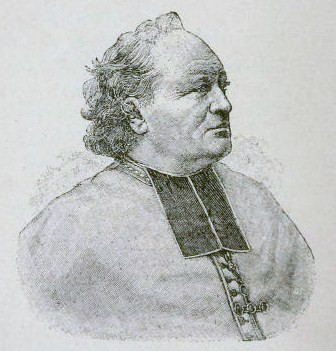
- Church: Catholic Church
- Diocese: Diocese of Dijon
- In office: 28 November 1898 – 4 September 1904
- Predecessor: Fédéric-Henri Oury
- Successor: Pierre Dadolle
- Other post: Titular Bishop of Dionysiopolis (1921-1922)
- Previous posts: Titular Bishop of Arca in Armenia (1896-1898); Auxiliary Bishop of Verdun (1896-1898)

Orders
- Ordination: 6 June 1868 by Jean-Pierre Bravard
- Consecration: 9 August 1896 by Jean-Pierre Pagis

Personal details
- Born: 19 April 1844 Montebourg, Manche, Kingdom of France
- Died: 29 January 1922 (aged 77) Montebourg, Manche, French Republic

Albert-Léon-Marie Le Nordez (1844–1922) was a French bishop of Dijon, from 1898, who was at the centre of a controversy leading to the 1905 separation in France of the Catholic Church and the state.

== Biography ==
Le Nordez was born in Montebourg. A critical report on him, accusing him of being a Freemason, was sent by a parish priest to Benedetto Lorenzelli, papal nuncio in France, and forwarded to Mariano Rampolla, Cardinal Secretary of State, in 1902.

Under Rampolla's successor, Rafael Merry del Val, Le Nordez was in 1904 summoned to Rome, to consult with the new Pope Pius X. Le Nordez went to Rome in July in a blaze of publicity, and was kept "in retreat". He resigned his see in September.

This was coupled with a related disciplinary story, that of Pierre-Joseph Geay, bishop of Laval. It caused a diplomatic crisis, against a background of suspicions that these bishops had been targets because of their sympathies for French Republican politics. France broke off relations with the Holy See, a situation that lasted another 17 years. The French politician Émile Combes announced on 30 July that “la volonté du Saint-Siège rend sans emploi les relations diplomatiques entre le Vatican et la France” (the wishes of the Holy See make useless the diplomatic ties between the Vatican and France).
