= Sigo =

6th-century Burgundian cleric and Roman Catholic saint

Sigo (Latin: Sequanus; French: Seine; died c. 580 AD) was a Burgundian abbot of the sixth century. He is a saint of the Roman Catholic Church, an Orthodox saint and the reputed founder of the Abbey of Saint-Seine. His feast day is September 19, both in the Roman Catholic Church and in the Orthodox Church.

== Life ==
Sigo lived in the town of Mesmont, in Burgundy. After living as a hermit for some time, the bishop of Langres ordained him to the priesthood. However, he was disliked by the local clergy, so he went to the monastery of Réomé to study scripture and help the monks there. Eventually, he left to found his own monastery in the forest of Segestre, near the Seine. He gained a reputation for miracles, began gathering followers and the monastery soon flourished. The monastery attracted nearby peasants who started settling a small community around the church. This community eventually became the town of Saint-Seine-l'Abbaye. Sigo died around 580 and was buried at the abbey. His relics were stolen during the French Revolution and have been presumed destroyed.
