= Jean Bouhier (jurist) =

French magistrate, jurisconsultus, historian, translator, bibliophile and scholar

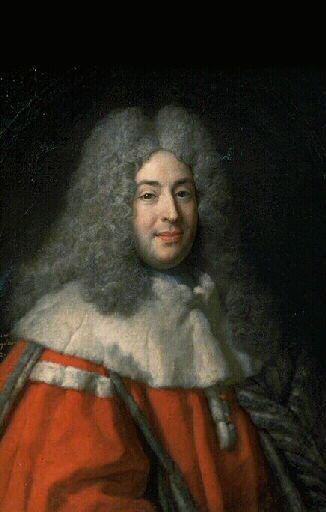
President Bouhier by Nicolas de Largillière – Dijon, musée des Beaux-arts

Jean Bouhier (16 March 1673, Dijon, Province of Burgundy – 17 March 1746, Dijon) was a French magistrate, jurisconsultus, historian, translator, bibliophile and scholar. He served as the first président à mortier to the parlement de Bourgogne from 1704 to 1728, when he resigned to devote himself to his historic and literary work following his 1727 election to the Académie française.

== Biography ==
From the rich Bouhier family (his brother Claude Bouhier de Lantenay became the second bishop of Dijon in 1744), Jean Bouhier had a vast network of correspondents right across Europe. The Eltons write of him:

Bouhier used to read his books and make notes upon them; and it is said that he carried the practice to such excess as to deface with marginal scribblings the finest work of Henri Estienne and Antoine Vérard. A visitor to his library described the sober magnificence of the rosewood shelves with silken hangings in which the rare editions and long rows of manuscripts were ranged.

He was renowned as much for his erudition as for the splendid library he had inherited from his ancestors, which he expanded and put at the disposal of the poets and writers he welcomed to his hôtel on rue Vauban in Dijon. At the end of his life the library held 35,000 works and 2,000 manuscripts, but all his collections were dispersed after his death and were mostly sold to Clairvaux Abbey.

== Works ==
Besides his treatise on Burgundian customs (considered his masterpiece), Jean Bouhier was the author of several works on jurisprudence as well as many dissertations. He also translated Latin classical texts, some in collaboration with the abbé d’Olivet, though Bouhier's translations were more appreciated by his contemporaries for their closeness to the original than for their style – his wife said to him "You take care of thinking, and leave me with the writing"

D’Alembert said of him :

Jurisprudence, philology, criticism, ancient and modern history, literary history, translations, eloquence and poetry, he shook everything, he embraced everything, and, for the most part, he gave distinguished and worthy proofs of himself.

=== History and jurisprudence ===
- Traité de la succession des mères en vertu de l’édit de Saint-Maur, avec une dissertation sur les droits de la mère en la succession de ses enfans, au cas de la substitution pupillaire, principalement par rapport à l’usage du Parlement de Dijon (1726)
- Dissertation sur la représentation en succession, suivant la coutume du duché de Bourgogne, avec une explication de l’article XXV de la même coutume (1734)
- Traité de la dissolution du mariage pour cause d’impuissance, avec quelques pièces curieuses sur le même sujet (1735)
- Supplément au Journal du règne d'Henri IV, depuis le 2 août 1589 jusques au 1er avril 1594; depuis le 1er de l’an 1598 jusques en 1602 et depuis le 1er de janvier 1607 jusques au mois de juin 1610 (1737)
- Les Coutumes du duché de Bourgogne, avec les anciennes coutumes tant générales que locales de la même province (2 volumes 1742–46)
- Œuvres de jurisprudence (2 volumes, 1787–88)

=== Translations ===
- Tusculanes de Cicéron (The Tusculanae Quaestiones of Cicero, 1737)
- Poëme de Pétrone sur la guerre civile entre César et Pompée, avec deux épîtres d’Ovide, en vers français, avec des remarques et des conjonctures sur le poëme intitulé "Pervigilium Veneris" (Poem by Petronius on the civil war between Caesar and Pompey, with two letters by Ovid, in French verse, with remarks and conjectures on the poem entitled Pervigilium Veneris'', 1737)
- Les Amours d’Énée et de Didon, poëme traduit de Virgile, avec diverses autres imitations d’anciens poëtes grecs et latins (The Loves of Aeneas and Dido, poem translated from Virgil, with several imitations of ancient Greek and Latin poets, 1742)
- Remarques sur Cicéron (Remarks on Cicero, 1746)
- Recherches et dissertations sur Hérodote (Researches and dissertations on Herodotus, 1746)

=== Memoirs and correspondence ===
- Souvenirs de Jean Bouhier, président au Parlement de Dijon, extraits d’un manuscrit autographe inédit et contenant des détails curieux sur divers personnages des XVIIe et XVIIIe siècle (1866)
- Correspondance littéraire (1974)
