= Saint-Seine-l'Abbaye =

- Commune
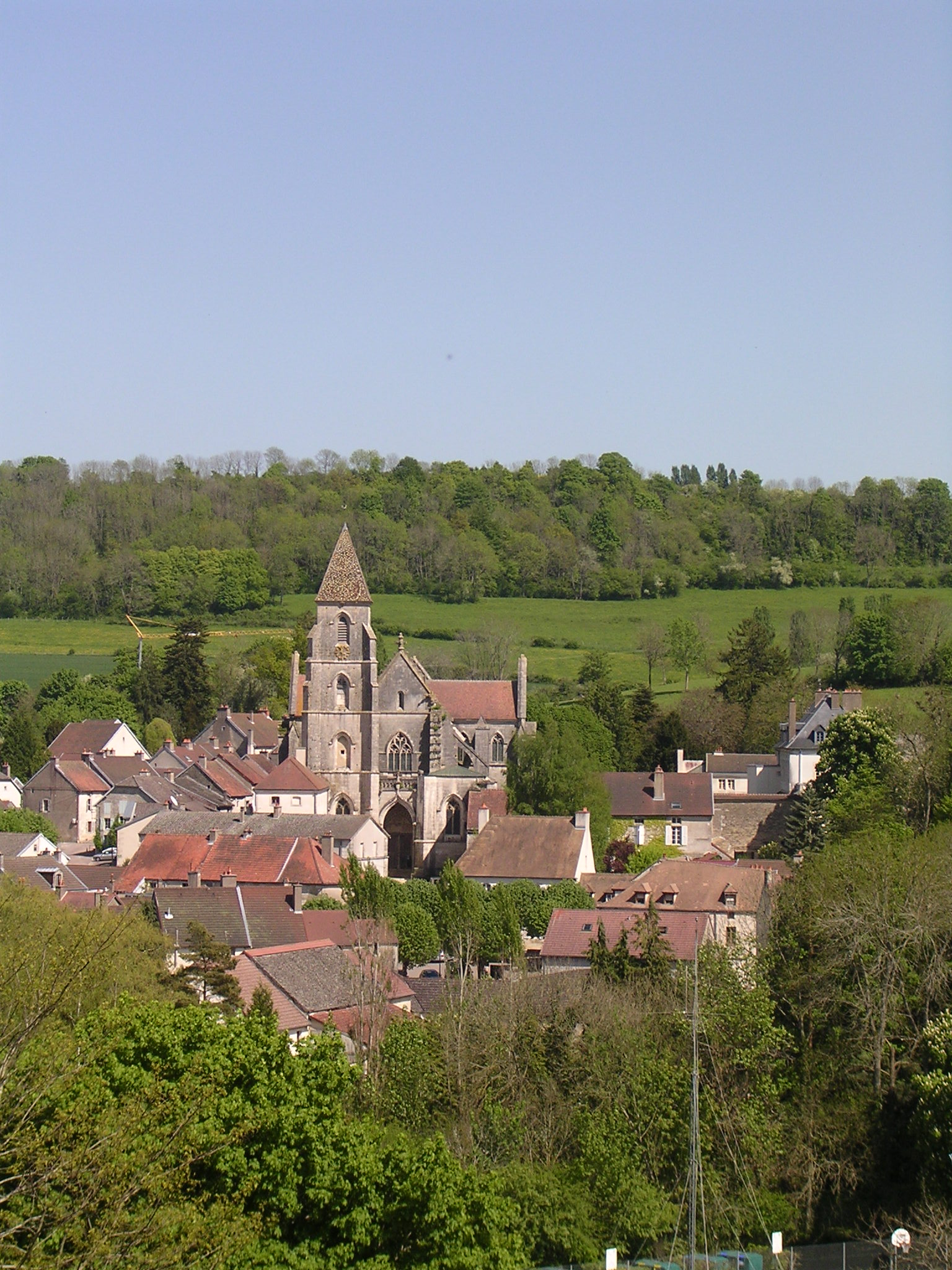
- A general view of Saint-Seine-l'Abbaye

- Coat of arms
- Location of Saint-Seine-l'Abbaye
- Location within France Location within Bourgogne-Franche-Comté
- Coordinates: 47°26′30″N 4°47′24″E
- Country: France
- Region: Bourgogne-Franche-Comté
- Department: Côte-d'Or
- Arrondissement: Dijon
- Canton: Fontaine-lès-Dijon

Government
  - Mayor (2020–2026): Fabien Cordier
- Area^{1}: 3.84 km^{2} (1.48 sq mi)
- Highest elevation: 570 m (1,870 ft)
- Lowest elevation: 429 m (1,407 ft)
- Population (2023): 364
  - Density: 94.8/km^{2} (246/sq mi)
- Time zone: UTC+01:00 (CET)
  - Summer (DST): UTC+02:00 (CEST)
- INSEE/Postal code: 21573 /21440
- ^{1} French Land Register data, which excludes lakes, ponds, glaciers > 1 km^{2} (0.386 sq mi or 247 acres) and river estuaries.

Saint-Seine-l'Abbaye (French pronunciation: [sɛ̃ sɛn labe.i]) is a commune in the Côte-d'Or department in eastern France.

It is also a place steeped in history with its archaeological sites, the goddess Sequana; nymph Sources close to the Seine and Alesia, the remnants of its ancient abbey (the Abbey of Saint-Seine) and the abbey church, a jewel of Gothic art primitive Burgundy and its rich rural heritage: the 1856 school converted into a museum, flower laundries, foundries, crucifixes, mills.

The abbey was founded by Saint Sequanus in the 6th century.

== Population ==
Historical population
Year	Pop.	±% p.a.
1968	358	—
1975	352	−0.24%
1982	309	−1.84%
1990	326	+0.67%
1999	355	+0.95%
2007	365	+0.35%
2012	359	−0.33%
2017	375	+0.88%
2023	364	−0.49%
Source: INSEE

== See also ==
- Communes of the Côte-d'Or department
