= Concordat of 1801 =

1801 agreement between France and Pope Pius VII

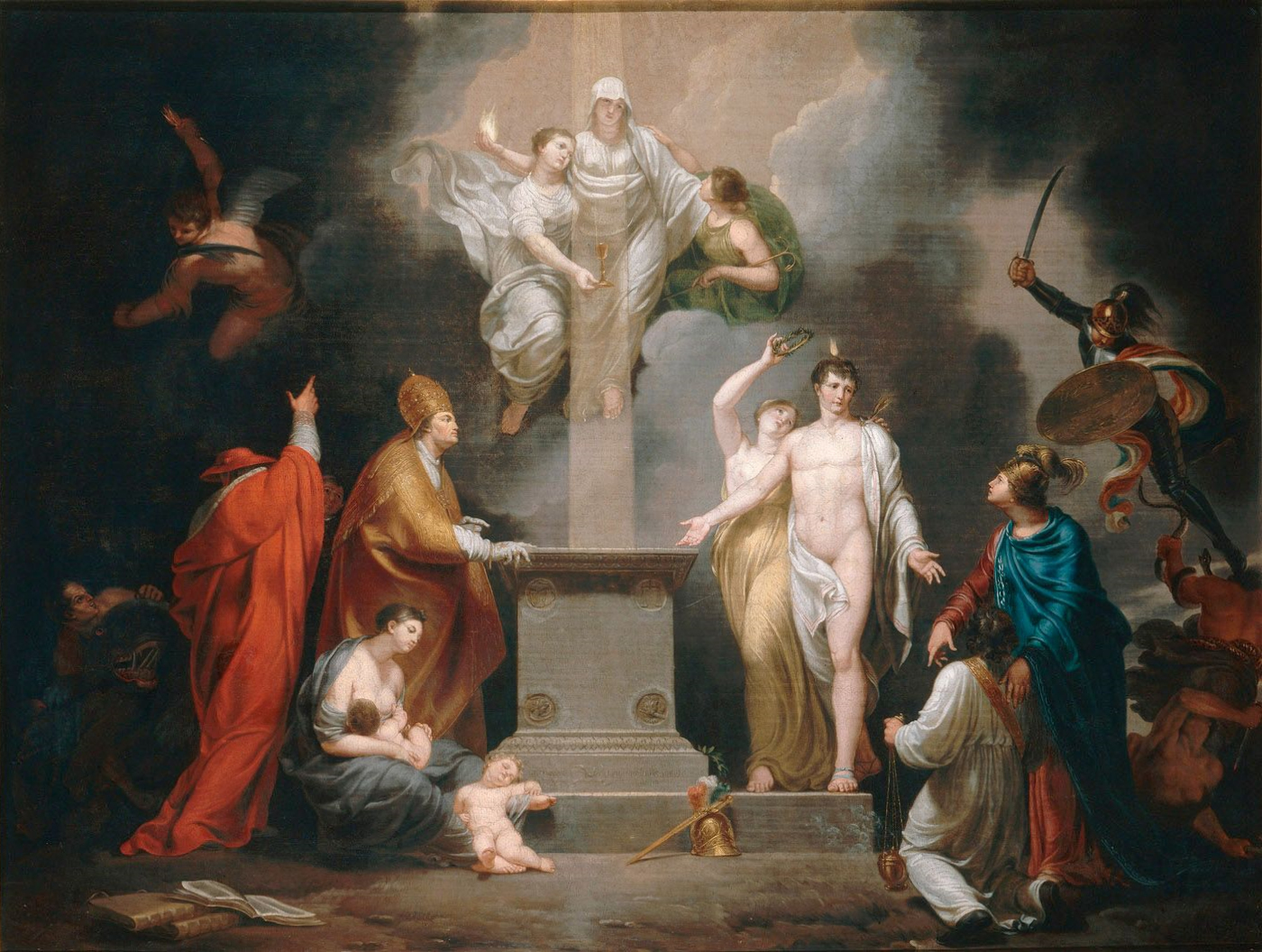
Allegory of the Concordat of 1801, by Pierre Joseph Célestin François

The Concordat of 1801 is an agreement between the French First Republic and the Holy See, signed by First Consul Napoleon Bonaparte and Pope Pius VII on 15 July 1801 in Paris. It remained in effect until 1905, except in Alsace–Lorraine, where it remains in force. It sought national reconciliation between the French Revolution and Catholics and solidified the Catholic Church as the majority church of France, with most of its civil status restored. This resolved the hostility of devout French Catholics against the revolutionary state. It did not restore the vast Church lands and endowments that had been seized during the Revolution and sold off. Catholic clergy returned from exile, or from hiding, and resumed their traditional positions in their traditional churches. Very few parishes continued to employ the priests who had accepted the Civil Constitution of the Clergy of the revolutionary regime. While the Concordat restored much power to the papacy, the balance of church-state relations tilted firmly in Bonaparte's favour. He selected the bishops and supervised church finances.

Bonaparte and the Pope both found the Concordat useful. Similar arrangements were made with the Church in territories controlled by France, especially Italy and Germany.

== History ==
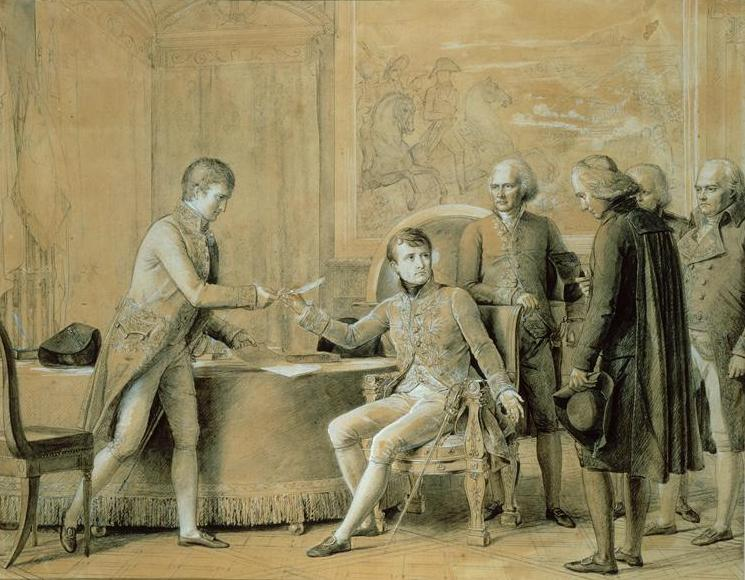
The signing of the Concordat, 15 July 1801 by François Gérard, 1803-1804

During the Revolution, the National Assembly had taken Church properties and issued the Civil Constitution of the Clergy, which made the Church a department of the state, effectively removing it from papal authority. At the time, the nationalised Gallican Church was the official church of France, but it was essentially Catholicism. The Civil Constitution caused hostility among the Vendeans towards the change in the relationship between the Catholic Church and the French government. Subsequent laws abolished the traditional Gregorian calendar and Christian holidays.

The Concordat was drawn up by a commission with three representatives from each party. Napoleon Bonaparte, who was First Consul of the French Republic at the time, appointed Joseph Bonaparte, his brother; Emmanuel Crétet, a counselor of state; and Étienne-Alexandre Bernier, a doctor in theology. Pope Pius VII appointed Cardinal Ercole Consalvi, Cardinal Giuseppe Spina, archbishop of Corinth, and his theological adviser, Father Carlo Francesco Maria Caselli. The French bishops, whether still abroad or returned to their own country, had no part in the negotiations. The concordat as finally arranged practically ignored them.

While the Concordat restored some ties to the papacy, it was largely in favour of the state; it wielded greater power vis-à-vis the Pope than previous French regimes had, and church lands lost during the Revolution were not returned. Napoleon took a utilitarian approach to the role of religion. He could now win favour with French Catholics while also controlling Rome in a political sense. Napoleon once told his brother Lucien in April 1801, "Skillful conquerors have not got entangled with priests. They can both contain them and use them." As a part of the Concordat, he presented another set of laws called the Organic Articles.

== Contents ==
The main terms of the Concordat of 1801 between France and Pope Pius VII included:

- A declaration that "Catholicism was the religion of the great majority of the French" but not the official state religion, thus maintaining religious freedom, in particular with respect to Protestants.
- The Papacy had the right to depose bishops; the French government still, since the Concordat of Bologna in 1516, nominated them.
- The state would pay clerical salaries and the clergy swore an oath of allegiance to the state.
- The Catholic Church gave up all its claims to Church lands that were confiscated after 1790.
- Sunday was reestablished as a "festival", effective Easter Sunday, 18 April 1802. The rest of the French Republican calendar, which had been abolished, was not replaced by the traditional Gregorian calendar until 1 January 1806.

According to Georges Goyau, the law known as "The Organic Articles", promulgated in April 1802, infringed in various ways on the spirit of the concordat. The document claimed Catholicism was "the religion of the majority of Frenchmen", and still gave state recognition to Protestants and Jews as well.

The Concordat was abrogated by the law of 1905 on the separation of church and state. However, some provisions of the Concordat are still in effect in the Alsace–Lorraine region under the local law of Alsace–Moselle, as the region was controlled by the German Empire at the time of the 1905 law's passage.

== See also ==
- Concordat in Alsace–Moselle
- Napoleon and the Jews
