= Claude Bouhier de Lantenay =

French clergyman

- Bishop of Dijon
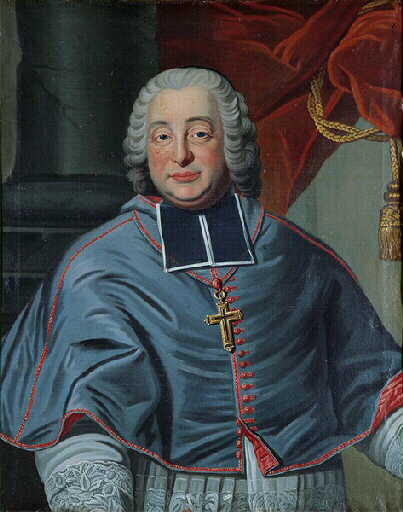
- 18th century French school - Portrait of Claude Bouhier - Musée des Beaux-Arts de Dijon
- Church: Catholic Church
- Diocese: Diocese of Dijon
- In office: 16 December 1743 – 19 June 1755
- Predecessor: Jean Jacques Bouhier
- Successor: Claude-Marc-Antoine d'Apchon de Corgenon

Orders
- Consecration: 26 January 1744 by Pierre Guérin de Tencin

Personal details
- Born: 8 April 1683 Dijon, Duchy of Burgundy, Kingdom of France
- Died: 19 June 1755 (aged 72) Dijon, Duchy of Burgundy, Kingdom of France

Claude Bouhier de Lantenay (19 October 1681 – 19 June 1755) was a French clergyman and the second bishop of Dijon after his uncle Jean Bouhier.

== Family ==
He was the son of Bénigne Bouhier (1635–1703), président à mortier to the parlement de Dijon, and Louise Claire Claude de La Toison (1650–1750). His brother was the jurist Jean Bouhier.
