= Jean Bouhier (bishop) =

French cleric

Jean Jacques Bouhier
- Bishop of Dijon
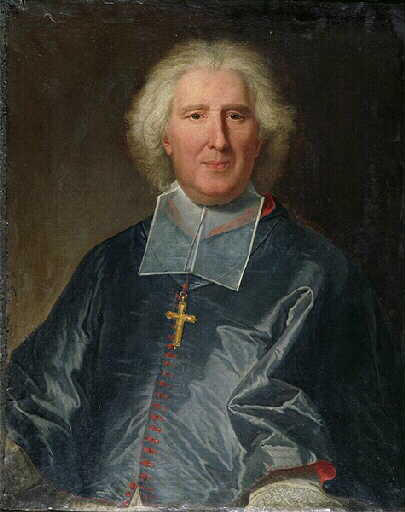
- Jean Bouhier by Henry Guillemart after Hyacinthe Rigaud
- Diocese: Diocese of Dijon
- Installed: 1731
- Term ended: 1743
- Predecessor: First holder
- Successor: Claude Bouhier de Lantenay

Personal details
- Born: 14 March 1666 Dijon
- Died: 15 October 1744 (aged 78) Dijon
- Denomination: Roman Catholic
- Parents: Jean Bouhier and Jeanne Claude Bernardon

Jean Jacques Bouhier (14 March 1666, in Dijon – 15 October 1744, in Dijon) was a French cleric and the first bishop of the Diocese of Dijon (holding it from 1731 until his death in 1743, when he was succeeded by his nephew Claude Bouhier de Lantenay).

== Family background ==
Bouhier came from a family of attorneys and local officials, who were also "great book collectors", described as "bibliophiles" and even "bibliomaniacs". Bouhier followed in the family tradition of the legal profession, which was called being in the "robe backgrounds", based upon what attorneys wore at the time. A learned man, he inherited the vast book and manuscript collection.

== Career ==
From 1703 to 1724, he was the doyen, or Dean, of the Saint Chapelle of Dijon, and from 1721 to 1724 a leader of the Estates General of Burgundy.

He was nominated by King Louis XV to be the bishop of a new Diocese of Dijon in 1726, but was not consecrated until the Diocese was formed in 1731, out of the former deanery.

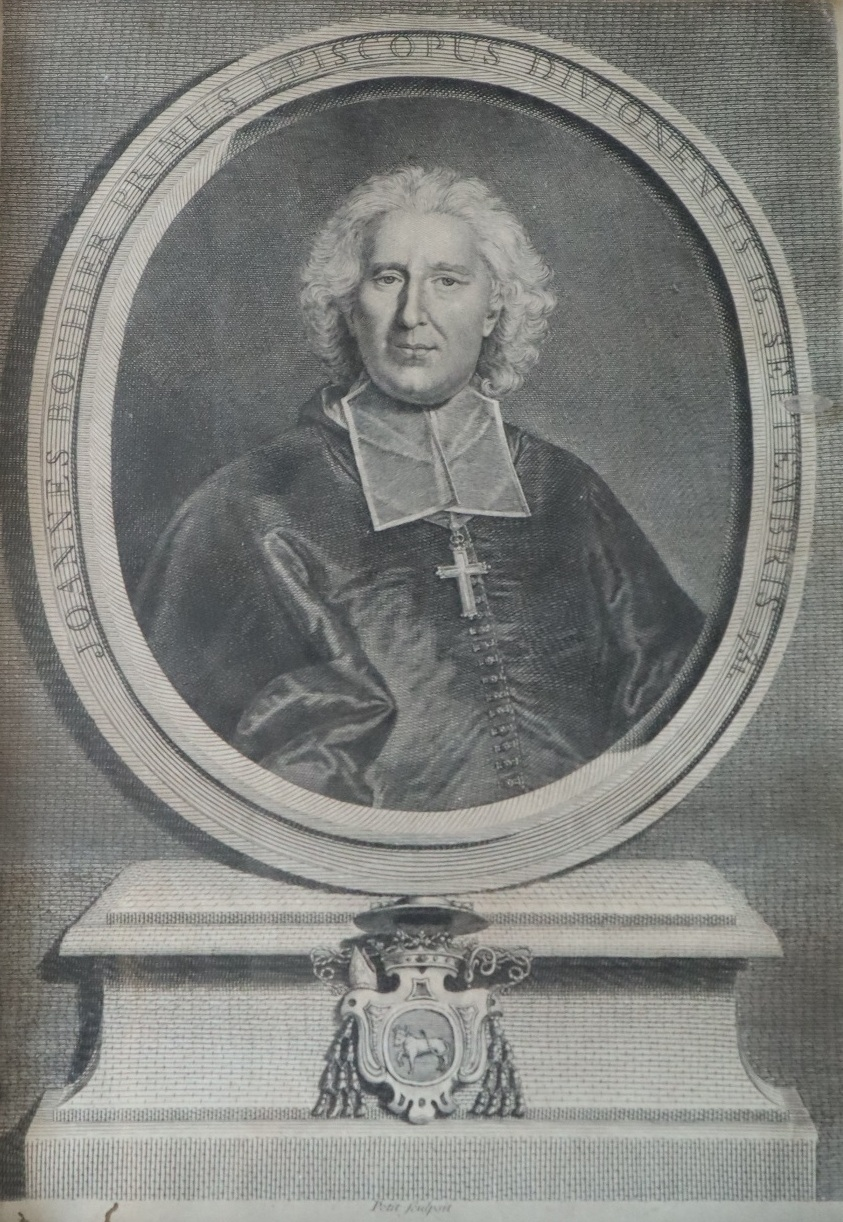
Engraved image of Jean Bouhier (1666-1744) 1st bishop of Dijon
