= 1905 French law on the Separation of the Churches and the State =

Legal basis of state secularism in France

Law on the Separation of Church and State

Legislative Chambers of the French Third Republic
- Long title: Law of 9 December 1905 on the Separation of the Churches and State
- Territorial extent: France, except in: Alsace and Moselle; French Guiana, French Polynesia, Wallis and Futuna, Saint Pierre and Miquelon, New Caledonia and Mayotte
- Enacted by: Chamber of Deputies
- Enacted by: Senate
- Signed by: President Émile Loubet
- Signed: 9 December 1905
- Commenced: 1 January 1906

Legislative history

Initiating chamber: Chamber of Deputies
- Introduced by: Aristide Briand (SI); Émile Combes (PRRRS); Jean Jaurès (SFIO); Francis de Pressensé (SFIO)
- Passed: 3 July 1905
- Voting summary: 341 voted for; 233 voted against

Revising chamber: Senate
- Passed: 6 December 1905
- Voting summary: 181 voted for; 102 voted against

Keywords
- Separation of Church and State; Freedom of religion Freedom of expression
- Status: Current legislation

The 1905 French law on the Separation of the Churches and State (French: Loi du 9 décembre 1905 concernant la séparation des Églises et de l'État) was passed by the Chamber of Deputies on 3 July 1905. Enacted during the Third Republic, it established state secularism in France. At the time, France was governed by the Bloc des gauches (Left Coalition) led by Émile Combes. The law was based on three principles: the neutrality of the state, the freedom of religious exercise, and public powers related to the church. This law is seen as the backbone of the French principle of laïcité (secularism). It is, however, not applicable in Alsace and Moselle, which were part of Germany when it was enacted.

== History ==
Prior to the French Revolution of 1789—since the days of the conversion of Clovis I to Christianity in 508 AD—Catholicism had been the state religion of France, and closely identified with the Ancien Régime. However, the revolution led to various policy changes, including a brief separation of church and state in 1795, ended by Napoleon's re-establishment of the Catholic Church as the national religion with the Concordat of 1801. An important document in the evolution toward religious liberty was Article Ten of the 1789 Declaration of the Rights of Man and of the Citizen, stating that "No one may be disturbed on account of his opinions, even religious ones, as long as the manifestation of such opinions does not interfere with the established Law and Order." The 1871 Paris Commune had proclaimed state secularism on 3 April 1871, but it had been cancelled following the Commune's defeat.

After the 16 May 1877 crisis and the victory of the republicans at the following elections, various draft laws requesting the suppression of the Concordat of 1801 were deposed, starting with the 31 July 1879 proposition of Charles Boysset. Beginning in 1879, the French state began a gradual national secularization program starting with the removal of priests from the administrative committees of hospitals and boards of charity, and in 1880 with the substitution of lay women for nuns in hospitals. Thereafter, the Third Republic established secular education with the Jules Ferry laws in 1881–1882, which were a significant part of the firm establishment of the republican regime in France, with religious instruction in all schools forbidden.

In 1886, another law ensured secularisation of the teaching staff of the National Education.

Other moves towards secularism included:

- the introduction of divorce and a requirement that civil marriages be performed in a civil ceremony
- legalizing work on Sundays
- making seminarians subject to conscription
- secularising schools and hospitals
- abolishing the law ordaining public prayers at the beginning of each parliamentary session and of the assizes
- ordering soldiers not to frequent Catholic clubs
- removing the religious character from the judicial oath and religious symbols from courtrooms
- forbidding the participation of the armed forces in religious processions

The 1901 Law of Associations, which guaranteed freedom of association, also enabled the control of religious communities and, notably, limited their influence on education. In 1903, while former Catholic seminarian Émile Combes was minister, a commission was selected to draft a bill that would establish a comprehensive separation between the state and the churches. Its president was the former Protestant pastor Ferdinand Buisson, and its minute writer was Aristide Briand.

On 30 July 1904, the Chamber of Deputies voted to sever diplomatic relations with the Holy See following the sanctioning by the Holy See of two French bishops (Albert-Léon-Marie Le Nordez and Pierre Joseph Geay) who had declared themselves republicans and in favour of conciliation with the Republic. The relationship was not reestablished until 1921, after the Senate accepted a proposition brought by Aristide Briand.

== Provisions ==
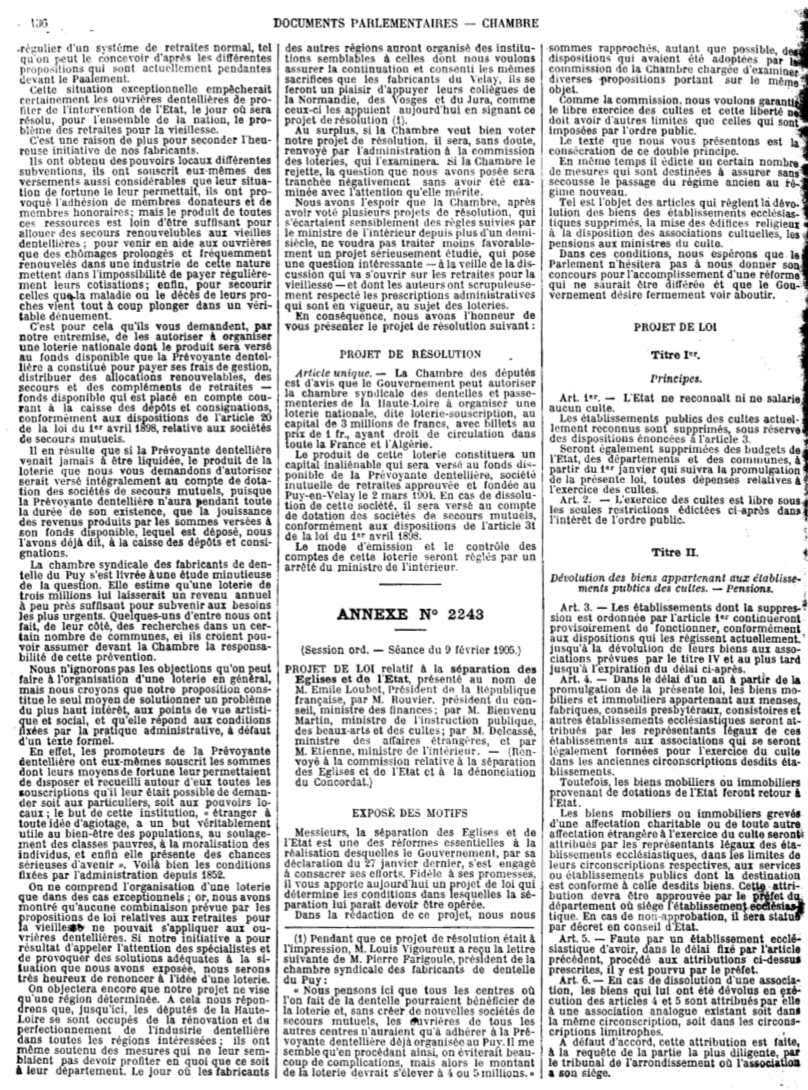
The first page of the bill, as brought before the French National Assembly in 1905

=== Title I: Principles ===
- Article 1 described the purpose of the act as to ensure "freedom of conscience" and to guarantee "the free exercise of religion under the provisos enacted hereafter in the interest of public order."
- Article 2 stated "The Republic does not recognize, pay, or subsidize any religious sect. Accordingly, from 1 January following the enactment of this law, there will be removed from state budgets, departments and municipalities, all expenses related to the exercise of religion." Exceptions are ennumerated regarding "schools, colleges, hospitals, asylums and prisons" so as "to ensure the free exercise of religion in public institutions".

=== Title II: Allocation of property, pensions ===
- Article 3 required that an inventory be made of all houses of worship previously supported by the government.
- Article 4 established a one-year period during which all "movable and immovable property of manses, factories, priests' councils, presbyteries and other public institutions of worship" was to comply with the rules for establishing legal associations under Article 19.
- Article 5 turned over to the government all property found during the inventory "not subject to a pious foundation created after the law of 18 Germinal Year X".
- Article 6 required that all loans made to religious organizations previously supported by the state must still be repaid.
- Article 7 gave authority to assess properties of the religious organizations to the prefect governing the department in which the property was located.
- Article 8 spelt out the consequences for non-compliance with the above articles.
- Article 9 (modified in 2015) detailed the methods of distribution of properties not claimed by the religious institutions to charitable organizations and local municipalities.
- Article 10 (modified in 2015) made provision regarding the taxation of mortgages and transfers of property.
- Article 11 (repealed in 2011) established pensions for certain clerics and employees of religious institutions.

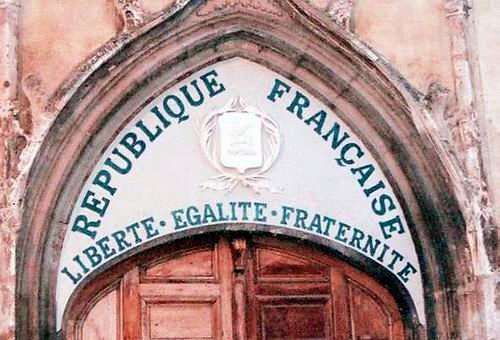
The republican motto "Liberté, Egalité, Fraternité" was put on this church in 1905 (following the law on the separation of the state and the church) to show that it was owned by the state.

=== Title III: Buildings of worship ===
- Article 12 (amended in 1998) declared all buildings which the state had made available to religious organizations the property of the state, pursuant to the following articles.
- Article 13 (modified in 2015) specified that the "buildings used for public worship, and movable objects furnishing them will be left free of charge to public institutions of worship", detailed the methods by which disputed ownership might be determined, and described procedures for reclamation of properties and fixtures abandoned by religious organizations.
- Article 14 provided the same as Article 13 for "Archdioceses, bishoprics, parsonages and their dependencies, major seminaries and faculties of Protestant theology".
- Article 15 specified that, "in the departments of the Savoy, the Haute Savoie and Alpes-Maritimes", buildings used "for the exercise of worship or for the accommodation of their ministers" might be "allocated by villages on the territory from which they are" pursuant to Article 12, while "cemeteries remain the property of the villages".
- Article 16 created a special category for "buildings for public religious worship (cathedrals, churches, chapels, temples, synagogues, archbishops, bishops, presbyters, seminaries), in which will be included all of these buildings representative in whole or in part, artistic or historical value."
- Article 17 required that any buildings covered by the articles be offered to: "1 religious associations; 2 communes; 3 departments; 4 museums and art and archaeology societies; 5 to the state," in that order.

=== Title IV: Associations for the exercise of religion ===
- Article 18 declared religious associations formed consistent "with Articles 5 and following of Title I of the Act of July 1, 1901" "further subject to the requirements of this law."
- Article 19 (modified in 2009 and in 2011) detailed the types and size of organizations to which this law applied.
- Article 20 allowed associations compliant with "Article 7 of Decree of 16 August 1901" to form unions.
- Article 21 (modified in 2015) required inventory reporting and auditing of associations and unions.
- Article 22 (modified in 2015) restricted reserve funds to the "costs and maintenance of worship".
- Article 23 (modified in 2015) stated the consequences of failure to comply.
- Article 24 exempted buildings used for religious purposes from certain property taxes.

=== Title V: Regulation of religious associations ===
- Article 25 declared all worship services open to the people.
- Article 26 banned "political meetings on the premises normally used for the exercise of worship".
- Article 27 (amended in 1996) regulated bell ringing.
- Article 28 banned religious symbols "on public monuments or in any public place whatsoever, except for buildings used for worship, burial grounds in cemeteries, monuments and museums or exhibitions."
- Article 29 held both ministers and congregants responsible for obeying these regulations.
- Article 30 (repealed in 2000) forbade religious instruction in state schools for students between six and thirteen years of age.
- Article 31 set out criminal penalties for any person "who, by assault, violence or threats against an individual or by making him afraid of losing his job or expose to damage his person, his family or his wealth" prevents another person from practising or contributing to a religious organization. The same holds for any person forcing another to participate in or contribute to any religious organization.
- Article 32 specified punishment for "those who have prevented, delayed or interrupted the exercises of worship".
- Article 33 stated that Articles 31 and 32 only apply to situations that do not qualify for "more severe penalties under the provisions of the Penal Code."
- Article 34 made religious ministers liable for defamatory and libellous statements made in places of worship. (This article was amended in 2000.)
- Article 35 provided for criminal penalties for seditious statements made by religious ministers in places of worship.
- Article 36 held liable for any damages the association involved in any conviction under Articles 25, 26, 34, and 35 civilly.

=== Title VI: General Provisions ===
- Article 37 related to the applicability of "Section 463 of the Penal Code and the Act of March 26, 1891" to this Act.
- Article 38 "Religious congregations remain subject to the laws of 1 July 1901, December 4, 1902, and July 7, 1904."
- Article 39 made benefits of certain seminary students granted by "section 23 of the Act of 15 July 1889" contingent upon their receiving ministerial employment.
- Article 40 disqualified religious ministers from election to municipal offices for eight years following ratification of the Act.
- Article 41 distributed money previously budgeted for supporting churches to municipalities. (Repealed)
- Article 42 retained legal holidays. (Repealed)
- Article 43 (amended in 2007) set a deadline of three months by which measures for implementation will be determined.
- Article 44 specified previous laws that were to remain in force along with the Act.

== Effects ==
The 1905 law put an end to the government funding of religious groups by France and its political subdivisions. (The state had previously agreed to such funding in the Napoleonic Concordat of 1801 as compensation for the Revolution's confiscation of church properties.) At the same time, it declared that all religious buildings were property of the state and local governments and made available for free to the church. Other articles of the law included the prohibition of affixing religious signs on public buildings, and laying down that the Republic no longer names French archbishops or bishops.

Secularization had a profound impact on church music. Government funding had provided a steady revenue source for funding professional musicians and installing large complex organs. Overnight, many choirs were disbanded and organists were forced to earn side income from teaching. A profound break in sacred music complexity can be found in the compositions of this time. Because much 19th century church music required professional forces no longer available, much of it was forgotten.

Alsace-Lorraine is still governed by the 1801 Concordat which recognises four religions, but not secularism. When the 1905 legislation superseded the Concordat elsewhere in France, Alsace-Lorraine was part of the German Empire; thus, the 1905 law has never applied there. Similarly, the law has never been applied in the overseas Department of French Guiana as it was a colony in 1905.

=== Reactions by the Catholic Church ===
Pope Pius X condemned the law in the February 1906 encyclical Vehementer Nos as a unilateral break of the 1801 Concordat; he later condemned it again in his August 1906 encyclical Gravissimo officii munere, declaring it a "nefarious law" and calling French Catholics to "defend the religion of your Fatherland". A third condemnation came in January 1907 through the encyclical Une fois encore. In 1908, the Supreme Tribunal of the Apostolic Penitentiary ruled that all Deputies and Senators who had voted in favour of the law were latae sententiae excommunicated.

Although the 1905 French law on the Separation of the Churches and the State initially was a particularly "painful and traumatic event" for the Catholic Church in France, the French government began making serious strides towards reconciliation with the Catholic Church later during the 1920s by both recognizing the social impact of organized religion in France and amending the law itself through new legislation and rendering court decisions that were favorable to organized religion in France. In 1921, the Catholic Church and French state began a series of negotiations for "pacification of law" in respect to both civil and canon law to create a harmonious day-to-day working relationship. These negotiations culminated in 1926 when Aristide Briand negotiated the Briand-Ceretti Agreement with the Holy See whereby the state reclaimed a role in the process of choosing diocesan bishops.

== Politics ==
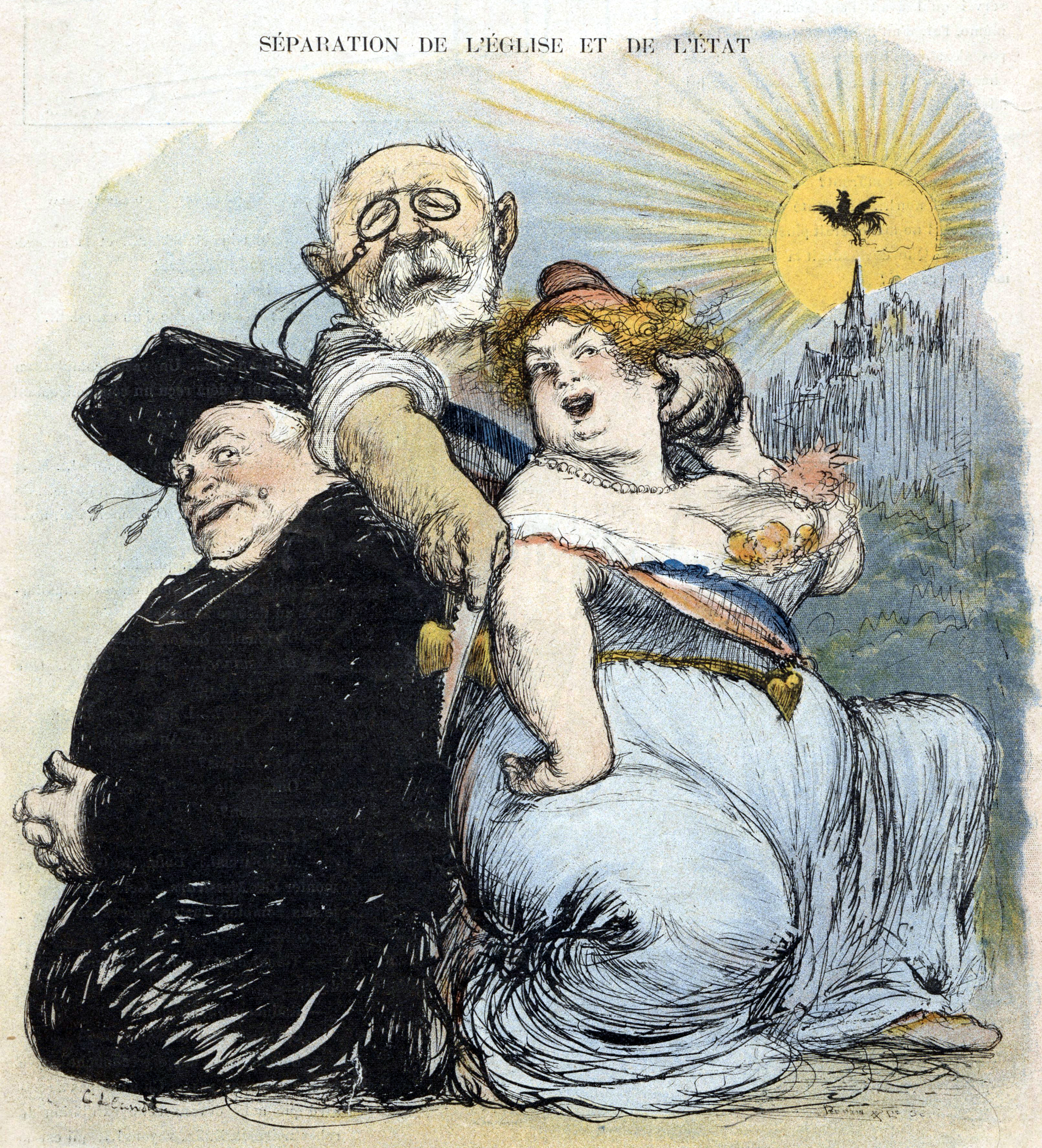
A caricature of Jean-Baptiste Bienvenu-Martin, Minister of Public Instruction, forcing the separation

The leading figures in the creation of the law were Aristide Briand, Émile Combes, Jean Jaurès and Francis de Pressensé.

The 1905 French law on the Separation of the Churches and the State declared that cathedrals remained the property of the state and smaller churches that of the local municipal government. Those public authorities had to hand over the buildings to religious organizations (associations culturelles) representing associations formed of laymen, instead of putting them directly back under the supervision of the church hierarchies.

These laymen associations created under the 1905 French law on the Separation of the Churches and the State were independent legal entities having rights and responsibilities in the eyes of the law in all matters appertaining to money and properties formerly owned in France by organized religions: churches and sacred edifices, ecclesiastical property, real and personal; the residences of the bishops and priests; and the seminaries. These laymen associations were also authorized by the law to act as administrators of church property, regulate and collect the alms and the legacies destined for religious worship. The resources furnished by Catholic liberality for the maintenance of Catholic schools, and the working of various charitable associations connected with religion, were also transferred to lay associations.

Implementation of the law was controversial, due in some part to the anti-clericalism found among much of the French political left at the time. The law angered many Catholics, who had recently begun to rally to the cause of the Republic, supported by Leo XIII's Inter innumeras sollicitudines 1892 encyclical (Au Milieu des sollicitudes) and Cardinal Lavigerie's toast in 1890 favour of the Republic. However, the concept of laïcité progressively became almost universally accepted among French citizens, including members of the Catholic Church who found greater freedom from state interference in cultural matters, now that the government had completely stripped itself of its former Catholic links. The Affaire Des Fiches produced a considerable backlash, after it was discovered that the Combes government worked with Masonic lodges to create a secret surveillance of all army officers to make sure devout Catholics would not be promoted.

A few French politicians and communities have more recently questioned the law, arguing that, despite its explicit stance for state secularism, it de facto favors traditional French religions, in particular the Catholic Church, at the expense of more recently established religions, such as Islam. Indeed, most Catholic churches in the country were built well before the enactment of the 1905 French law on the Separation of the Churches and the State, and thus are maintained at full public expense, although not always on time and to the extent that the church would like. With the exception of the historically anomalous Alsace-Lorraine, followers of Islam and other religions more recently implanted in France instead have to build and maintain religious facilities at their own expense. This was one of the controversial arguments used by Nicolas Sarkozy, when he was Minister of Interior, in favour of funding other cultural centers than those of Catholicism, Protestantism and Judaism. In 2016, President Hollande proposed a temporary ban on foreign funding for mosques and shut down at least 20 mosques found to be "preaching radical Islamic ideology". These actions are consistent with Title V, Articles 26, 29, and 35 of the law.

== See also ==
- Affaire des Fiches
- Catholic Church in France
- Concordat of 1801
- First Textbook War
- French legislation for the prevention and repression of cultic groups
- Law of December 9, 1905, concerning the separation of Church and State from Wikisource (in French)
- French School Wars
- State secularism
