= Mesmont, Côte-d'Or =

Mesmont
- Commune
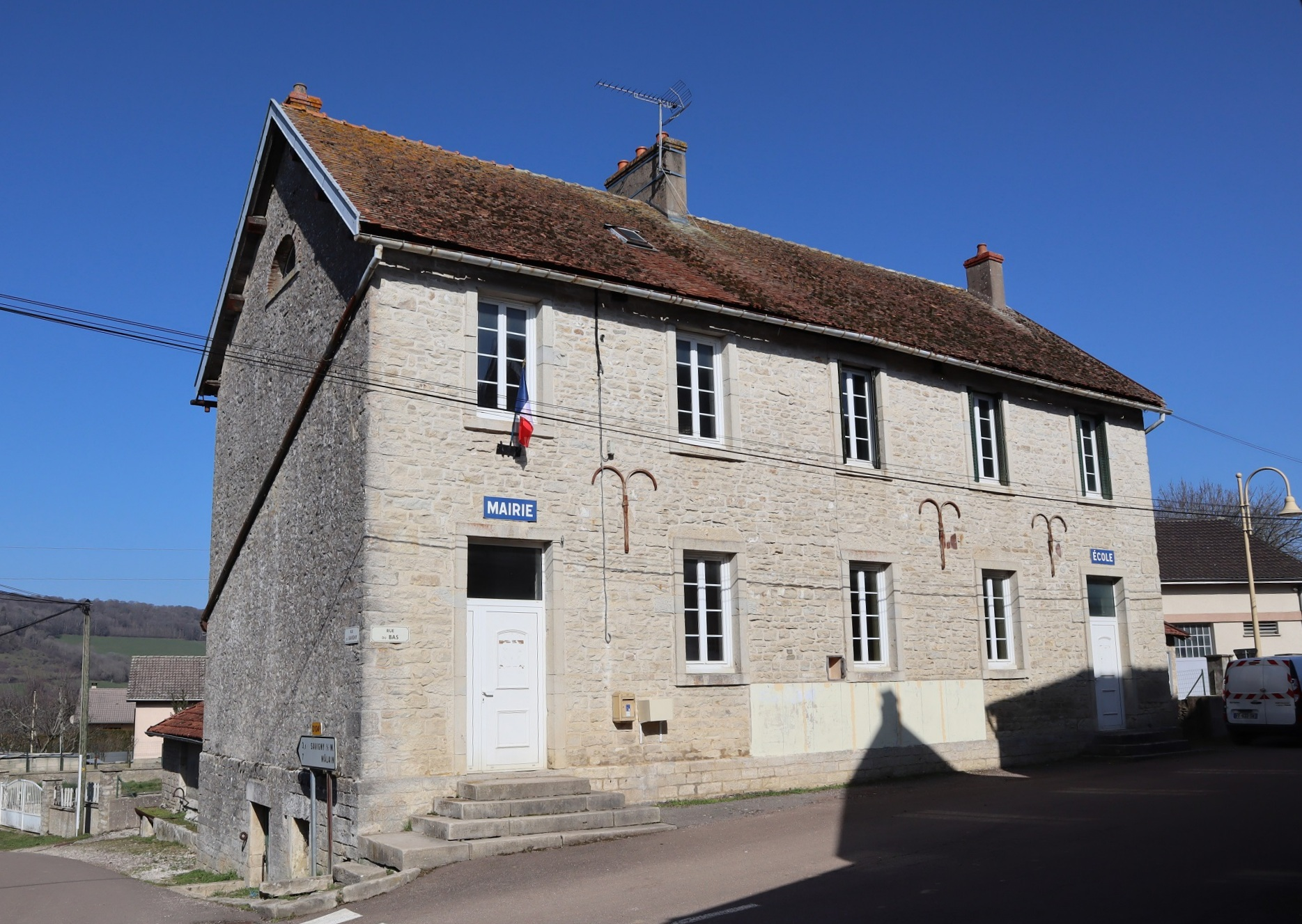
- Town hall
- Location of Mesmont
- Location within France Location within Bourgogne-Franche-Comté
- Coordinates: 47°18′48″N 4°44′43″E
- Country: France
- Region: Bourgogne-Franche-Comté
- Department: Côte-d'Or
- Arrondissement: Dijon
- Canton: Talant

Government
  - Mayor (2020–2026): Yves Martin
- Area^{1}: 6.37 km^{2} (2.46 sq mi)
- Elevation: 448 m (1,470 ft)
- Highest elevation: 560 m (1,840 ft)
- Lowest elevation: 325 m (1,066 ft)
- Population (2023): 253
  - Density: 39.7/km^{2} (103/sq mi)
- Time zone: UTC+01:00 (CET)
  - Summer (DST): UTC+02:00 (CEST)
- INSEE/Postal code: 21406 /21540
- ^{1} French Land Register data, which excludes lakes, ponds, glaciers > 1 km^{2} (0.386 sq mi or 247 acres) and river estuaries.

Mesmont (French pronunciation: [mɛmɔ̃]) is a commune in the Côte-d'Or department of eastern France.

== Population ==
Historical population
Year	Pop.	±% p.a.
1968	71	—
1975	65	−1.25%
1982	125	+9.79%
1990	146	+1.96%
1999	175	+2.03%
2007	199	+1.62%
2012	229	+2.85%
2017	247	+1.52%
2023	253	+0.40%
Source: INSEE

== See also ==
- Communes of the Côte-d'Or department
