= Ivar =

Male given name

Ivar (Old Norse Ívarr) is a Scandinavian masculine given name. Another variant of the name is Iver, which is more common in Norway. The Old Norse name has several possible etymologies. In North Germanic phonology, several of the elements common to Germanic names became homophonous. The first element Ívarr may contain yr "yew" and -arr (from hari, "warrior"), but it may have become partly conflated with Ingvar, and possibly Joar (element jó "horse"). The second element -arr may alternatively also be from geir "spear" or it may be var "protector". The name was adopted into English as Ivor, into Gaelic as Ìomhar, into Estonian as Aivar or Aivo and into Latvian as Ivars.

Notable people and characters with the name include:

== Pre-Modern ==
- Ivar the Boneless, Viking king, who some scholars believe to be identical to:
- Ímar
  - Uí Ímair (House of Ivar), his descendants
    - Ragnall ua Ímair
    - Sihtric ua Ímair
    - Gofraid ua Ímair
- Ivar Vidfamne, legendary Danish king of at least Scania and Zealand
- Ivar of Waterford, Norse king of Waterford and briefly King of Dublin
- Ivar of Limerick, last Norse king of Limerick
- Ímar Ua Ruaidín, medieval Irish bishop
- Ímar Ua Donnabáin (Ivor O'Donovan), legendary Irish navigator and sorcerer
- Ímar mac Arailt, King of Dublin

== Modern ==
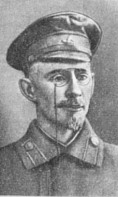
Ivar Smilga

- Ivar Aarseth (1889–1972), Norwegian politician
- Ivar Aasen (1813–1896), Norwegian philologist and lexicographer
- Ivar Aavatsmark (1864–1947), Norwegian politician
- Ivar Aavatsmark (forester) (1916–2004), Norwegian businessman
- Ivar Afzelius (1848–1921), Swedish jurist and politician
- Ivar Alanen (1863–1936), Finnish politician
- Ivar Alnæs (1868–1956), Norwegian teacher and linguist
- Ivar Aminoff (1868–1931), Finnish lawyer and politician
- Ivar Andersson (born 1903), Swedish footballer
- Ivar F. Andresen (1896–1940), Norwegian opera singer
- Ivar Antonsen (born 1946), Norwegian jazz pianist and composer
- Ivar Aronsson (1928–2017), Swedish rower
- Ivar Arosenius (1878–1909), Swedish painter and picture book illustrator
- Ivar Arpi (born 1982), Swedish columnist and debater
- Ivar Asheim (1927–2020), Norwegian theologian
- Ivar Asjes (born 1970), Curaçaoan politician
- Ivar Backlund (1892–1969), Swedish Army officer
- Ivar Bae (1897–1967), Norwegian politician
- Ivar Ballangrud (1904–1969), Norwegian speed skater
- Ívar Bárðarson, Norwegian catholic priest
- Ivar Bauck (1863–1937), Norwegian general
- Ivar Belck-Olsen (1932–2018), Norwegian politician
- Ivar Otto Bendixson (1861–1935), Swedish mathematician
- Ivar Bentsen (1876–1943), Danish architect
- Ivar Bern (born 1967), Norwegian chess player
- Ivar Bjare (1943–1995), Swedish luger
- Ívar Bjarklind (born 1974), Icelandic footballer
- Ivar Bjørklund (1949–2026), Norwegian anthropologist and writer
- Ivar Bjørnson (born 1977), Norwegian guitarist
- Ivar Loe Bjørnstad (born 1981), Norwegian jazz and rock musician
- Ivar Böhling (1889–1929), Finnish wrestler
- Ivar Bøksle (1947–2025), Norwegian singer and accordionist
- Ivar Braut (born 1956), Norwegian Theologian
- Ivar Bredal (1800–1864), Danish composer and musician
- Ivar Brogger (born 1947), American actor
- Ivar W. Brogger (1880–1963), Norwegian-American electrical engineer and inventor
- Ivar Campbell (1904–1985), New Zealand screenwriter and film director
- Ivar Cederholm (1902–1982), Norwegian tenor
- Ivar An Christensen (1868–1934), Norwegian ship owner
- Ivar Colquhoun (1916–2008), British nobleman
- Ivar David-Andersen (1903–1998), Norwegian goldsmith
- Ivar van Dinteren (born 1979), Dutch footballer and coach
- Ivar Egeberg (born 1950), Norwegian politician
- Ivar Kornelius Eikrem (1898–1994), Norwegian politician
- Ivar Ekeland (born 1944), French mathematician
- Ivar P. Enge (1922–2013), Norwegian radiologist
- Ivar Enger (born 1973), Norwegian guitarist
- Ivar Eriksen (born 1942), Norwegian speed skater
- Ivar Eriksson (1909–1997), Swedish footballer
- Ivar Eskeland (1927–2005), Norwegian philologist
- Ivar Færder (1886–2000), Norwegian newspaper editor and politician
- Ivar Flem (1865–1948), Norwegian newspaper editor
- Ivar Fløistad (1846–1926), Norwegian politician
- Ivar Asbjørn Følling (1888–1973), Norwegian physician and biochemist
- Ivar Fonnes (born 1944), Norwegian historian and archivist
- Ivar Formo (1951–2006), Norwegian orienteer
- Ivar Andreas Forn (born 1983), Norwegian footballer
- Ivar Franzén (1932–2004), Swedish politician
- Erik Ivar Fredholm (1866–1927), Swedish mathematician
- Ivar Frønes (born 1946), Norwegian sociologist
- Ivar Frounberg (born 1950), Danish composer and organist
- Ivar Furu (born 1994), Norwegian footballer
- Ivar Furu (politician) (1928–2012), Norwegian politician
- Ivar Geelmuyden (1819–1875), Norwegian politician
- Ivar Genesjö (1931–2020), Swedish fencer
- Ivar Gewert (1891–1971), Swedish Army officer
- Ivar Giaever (1929–2025), Norwegian–American physicist
- Ivar de Graaf (born 1973), Dutch musician
- Ivar Grande (1911–1944), Norwegian Nazi collaborator
- Ivar Grünthal (1924–1996), Estonian writer
- Ivar Grydeland (born 1976), Norwegian jazz guitarist and composer
- Ivar Haglund (1905–1985), American singer
- Ivar Halfdansson (born 0750), Norse semi-legendary figure
- Ivar Hallström (1826–1901), Swedish composer
- Ivar Hansen (1938–2003), Danish politician
- Ivar J. Hauge (1936–2017), Norwegian politician
- Ivar Heikel (1861–1952), Finnish philologist and historian
- Ivar Hippe (born 1953), Norwegian journalist
- Ivar Hognestad (born 1956), Norwegian politician
- Ivar Kristiansen Hognestad (1888–1973), Norwegian politician
- Ivar Holmquist (1879–1954), Swedish Army officer and sports official
- Ivar Hörhammer (1884–1953), Finnish politician, journalist, and art dealer
- Iver Huitfeldt (1665–1710), Dano-Norwegian military officer
- Ivar Hvamstad (1878–1916), Norwegian politician
- Iver Larsen Hvamstad (1843–1903), Norwegian politician
- Ívar Ingimarsson (born 1977), Icelandic footballer
- Ivar (wrestler) (born 1984), American professional wrestler
- Ivar Ivask (1927–1992), Estonian poet and literary scholar
- Ivar Iversen (1914–2012), Norwegian canoeist
- Thor Iversen (1873–1953), Norwegian civil servant
- Ivar Jacobson (born 1939), Swedish computer scientist and software engineer
- Ivar Jakobsen (born 1954), Danish cyclist
- Ivar Jenner (born 2004), Indonesian footballer
- Ivar Jerven (1924–1994), Norwegian graphic artist
- Ivar Johansen (bobsledder) (1910–1984), Norwegian bobsledder
- Ivar Johansen (journalist) (1923–2005), Norwegian journalist and editor
- Ivar Johansson (director) (1889–1963), Swedish film director and writer
- Ivar Johansson (politician) (1899–1994), Swedish politician
- Ivar Johansson (wrestler) (1903–1979), Swedish wrestler
- Ivar Jørgensen (1877–1956), Norwegian civil servant and politician
- Ivar Kåge (1881–1951), Swedish actor
- Ivar Kallion (1931–2013), Estonian politician
- Ivar Kants (born 1949), Australian actor
- Ivar Kirkeby-Garstad (1877–1951), Norwegian politician
- Ivar Kleiven (1854–1934), Norwegian politician, historian, and poet
- Ivar Klingström (1897–1993), Swedish footballer
- Ivar Knudsen (1861–1920), Danish engineer
- Ivar Kolve (born 1967), Norwegian jazz musician
- Ivar Kreuger (1880–1932), Swedish civil engineer and industrialist
- Ivar Kristiansen (born 1956), Norwegian politician
- Ivar Kristianslund (1934–2023), Norwegian preacher
- Ivar Langen (born 1942), Norwegian rector
- Ivar Lantto (1862–1938), Finnish politician
- Ivar Lassy (1889–1938), Finnish writer and anthropologist
- Ivar Leimus (born 1953), Estonian historian and numismatist
- Ivar Leveraas (born 1935), Norwegian politician
- Ivar of Limerick, King of Hlymrek
- Ivar Lykke Falch Lind (1870–1951), Norwegian jurist and politician
- Ivar Lissner (1909–1967), German author, journalist, and spy
- Ivar Lo-Johansson (1901–1990), Swedish writer
- Ole Ivar Lovaas (1927–2010), Norwegian-American psychologist
- Ivar Lundberg (1878–1952), Swedish long-distance runner
- Ivar Lunde (1908–1992), Norwegian diplomat
- Ivar Lykke (architect) (born 1941), Norwegian architect
- Ivar Lykke (footballer) (1889–1955), Danish footballer
- Ivar Lykke (politician) (1872–1949), Norwegian politician
- Ivar Martinsen (1920–2018), Norwegian speed skater
- Ivar Mathisen (1920–2008), Norwegian canoeist
- Ivar Medaas (1938–2005), Norwegian musician
- Ivar Mendez, Canadian neurosurgeon and neuroscientist
- Ivar A. Mjør (1933–2017), Norwegian odontologist
- Ivar Mobekk (born 1959), Norwegian ski jumper
- Ivar Moe (1922–2014), Norwegian politician
- Ivar Molde (1949–2024), Norwegian politician
- Ivar Mølgaard (born 2000), Danish rower
- Ivar Mortensson-Egnund (1857–1934), Norwegian writer and revolutionary
- Lord Ivar Mountbatten (born 1963), British noble
- Ivar Must (born 1961), Estonian composer and music producer
- Ivar Høsteng Neerland (1907–1978), Norwegian politician
- Ivar Nergaard (born 1964), Norwegian actor and writer
- Ivar Nilsson (1933–2019), Swedish speed skater
- Ivar Nordkild (born 1941), Norwegian biathlete
- Ivar Nordlund (1855–1937), Finnish politician
- Ivar Jacobsen Norevik (1900–1956), Norwegian politician
- Ivar Nørgaard (1922–2011), Danish politician
- Ivar Morten Normark (born 1963), Norwegian footballer and manager
- Ivar Nosy, Liegeman of Haakon IV of Norway
- Ivar Odnes (1963–2018), Norwegian politician
- Ivar Werner Oftedal (1894–1976), Norwegian mineralogist
- Ivar Öhman (1914–1989), Swedish journalist and diplomat
- Ivar Orgland (1921–1994), Norwegian writer
- Ivar Østberg (1942–2023), Norwegian politician
- Ivar B. Prestbakmo (born 1968), Norwegian politician
- Ivar Raig (born 1953), Estonian politician
- Ivar Ramstad (1924–2009), Norwegian discus thrower
- Ivar Sollie Rønning (born 1993), Norwegian footballer
- Ivar Rønningen (born 1975), Norwegian footballer
- Ivar Rooth (1888–1972), Swedish lawyer and economist
- Iver Rosenkrantz (1674–1745), Danish statesman
- Ivar Roslund (1907–1988), Swedish footballer
- Ivar Ruste (1916–1985), Norwegian singer
- Ivar Ryberg (1885–1929), Swedish rower
- Ivar Bergersen Sælen (1855–1923), Norwegian politician
- Ivar Sahlin (1895–1980), Swedish triple and high jumper
- Ivar Samset (1918–2015), Norwegian forester
- Ivar Sandboe, Norwegian handball player
- Ivar Sandström (1889–1917), Swedish aviation pioneer
- Ivar Saris (born 1993), Dutch professional pool player
- Ivar Schjøtt (born 1955), Norwegian fencer
- Ivar Schmidt (born 1946), Australian politician
- Ivar Sigmundsson (born 1942), Icelandic alpine skier
- Ivar Sisniega (born 1958), Mexican modern pentathlete
- Ivar Sjölin (1918–1992), Swedish wrestler
- Ivar Skarland (1889–1965), Norwegian anthropologist
- Ivar Skippervold (born 1949), Norwegian singer and musician
- Ivar Skjånes (1888–1975), Norwegian politician
- Ivar Heming Skre (1897–1943), Norwegian resistance member
- Ivar Skulstad (born 1953), Norwegian politician
- Ivar Slik (born 1993), Dutch cyclist
- Ivar Smilga (1892–1937), Latvian communist politician
- Ivar Stafuza (born 1961), Argentine footballer
- Ivar Stakgold (1925–2018), Norwegian American mathematician
- Ívar Stefánsson (1927–2009), Icelandic cross-country skier
- Ivar Stenberg (born 2007), Swedish ice hockey player
- Ivar Stokke (1911–1993), Norwegian sport wrestler
- Ivar Stukolkin (born 1960), Estonian swimmer
- Ivar Svendsen (1929–2015), Norwegian actor
- Ivar Svensson (1893–1934), Swedish footballer
- Ivar Tallo (born 1964), Estonian politician
- Ivar Tengbom (1878–1968), Swedish architect
- Ivar Thomassen (1954–2016), Norwegian folk singer-songwriter and pianist
- Ivar Throndsen (1853–1932), Norwegian engraver
- Ivar Tidestrom (1864–1956), Swedish-American botanist
- Ivar Tingdahl (1893–1962), Swedish fencer
- Ivar Tollefsen (born 1961), Norwegian billionaire businessman
- Ivar Tveit (1880–1952), Norwegian newspaper editor
- Ivar Petterson Tveiten (1850–1932), Norwegian politician
- Ivar Ueland (1943–2020), Norwegian politician
- Ivar Karl Ugi (1930–2005), Estonian-German chemist
- Ivar Michal Ulekleiv (born 1966), Norwegian biathlete
- Ivar Vennerström (1881–1945), Swedish politician
- Ivar Vičs (1960–1981), Dutch graffiti artist
- Ivor Vidler (1909–1976), Australian public servant
- Ivar Anton Waagaard (born 1955), Norwegian pianist
- Ivar Waller (1898–1991), Swedish theoretical physicist
- Ivar of Waterford, Norse king
- Ivar Wester (1892–1967), Swedish sports shooter
- Ivar Wickman (1872–1914), Swedish physician
- Ivar Widner (1891–1973), Swedish military music composer
- Ivar Ytreland (1926–2012), Norwegian politician

== Fictional characters ==
- Ivar the Timewalker, in the Valiant Comics universe

== See also ==
- Ivars, Latvian masculine given name derived from Ivar
