= Aimar (name) =

Aimar is a masculine given name of Germanic origin, common in mainly the Basque Country and Estonia (with 5,500 resp. 600 name bearers). Aimar is also used as a surname, probably as a result of the name having been used as a patronymic.

== Etymology ==
The name Aimar is a Frankish form of the German name Agimar, composed by agi- (either from age 'reverence, discipline' or egg 'edge') and -mar ('famous'). An alternative interpretation is the name is composed of the words haim ('home') and hard ('hard').

In Estonia, onomasticians have suggested the name could be one of many versions of the popular name Aivar (in turn loaned from Latvian Aivars, a version of Scandinavian Ivar).

== History ==
There are references to the name in medieval texts from the 13th to 14th centuries in the Kingdom of Navarre. In later years it has been assimilated as a Basque name, and has become a popular name for boys in the Basque Country and Navarre.

== People with Aimar as first name ==
- Aimar Altosaar (born 1959), Estonian sociologist, journalist and politician
- Aimar Centeno (born 1986), Argentine footballer
- Aimar Duñabeitia (born 2005), Spanish footballer
- Aimar Govea (born 2006), Ecuadorian footballer
- Hans Aimar Mow Grønvold (1846–1926), Norwegian civil servant
- Aimar-Charles-Marie de Nicolaï (1747–1794), French writer
- Aimar Modelo (born 2005), Panamanian footballer
- Aimar Moratalla (born 1987), Spanish football player
- Aimar Olaizola (born 1979), Spanish pelota player
- Aimar Oroz (born 2001), Spanish footballer
- Aimar Sagastibelza (born 1984), Spanish football player
- Aimar Sher (born 2002), Swedish football player
- Aimar August Sørenssen (1823–1908), Norwegian politician
- Aimar V of Limoges (1135–1199), French nobleman

== People with Aimar as surname ==
- Alessandro Aimar (born 1967), Italian sprinter
- Ambrosio Aimar (1923–2007), Argentine cyclist
- Andrés Aimar (born 1981), Argentine footballer
- Carlos Aimar (born 1950), Argentine football player and coach
- Darío Aimar (born 1995), Ecuadorian footballer
- Lucien Aimar (born 1941), French cyclist
- Pablo Aimar (born 1979), Argentine football player
- Thierry Aimar (born 1966), French economist

== See also ==
- Aymar
