= A. rubra =

A. rubra may refer to:

- Acanthophoenix rubra, the Barbel palm, a critically endangered palm species endemic to Mauritius, Rodrigues and La Reunion
- Actaea rubra, the red baneberry, Chinaberry or doll's eye, a poisonous herbaceous flowering plant species native from northern and western America
- Alnus rubra, the red alder, a deciduous broadleaf tree species native to western North America
- Alleizettella rubra, a plant species endemic to Vietnam
- Aphelodoris rubra, a sea slug species
- Asclepias rubra, red milkweed, a species of milkweed native to America
- Aseroe rubra, the anemone stinkhorn or sea anemone fungus, a fungus species found in Australia
