= Ivar (disambiguation) =

Ivar is a Scandinavian given name.

Ivar may also refer to:

- Ivar (1980 film), a 1980 Malayalam film
- Ivar (2003 film), a 2003 Malayalam film
- Ivar (brand), a brand of backpacks
- Ivar (wrestler) (born 1984), American professional wrestler
- Ivar, Kuhsorkh, a village in Iran
- Ivar's, an American restaurant
- Ivars, a Latvian given name
- Instance variable (iVar), especially in the Objective-C programming language
- Ímar (Old Norse: Ivar), a 9th-century Norse king
- 1627 Ivar, a near-Earth asteroid
