= Sandström =

Sandström is a Swedish surname. It derives from the Swedish words sand and ström which literally means Sandstream.

Notable people with the surname include (all Swedes if not noted):

- Anna Sandström (1854–1929), educational reformer and feminist
- Anton Sandström (b. 1981), curler
- Beatrice Sandström (1910–1995), surviving passenger on board RMS Titanic in 1912
- Bertil Sandström (1887–1964), horse rider
- David Sandström (b. 1975), punk rock drummer
- David Sandström (ReGenesis character)
- Emil Sandström (1886–1962), lawyer and chairman of the International Federation of Red Cross and Red Crescent Societies 1950–1959
- Felix Sandström (b. 1997), ice hockey player
- Folke Sandström (1892–1962), equestrian
- Ingvar Sandström (b. 1942), cross country skier
- Ivar Sandström (1889–1917), aviation pioneer
- Jan Sandström (b. 1954), composer
- Jan Sandström (b. 1978), ice hockey player
- Johan Sandström (1874–1947), oceanographer and meteorologist
- Jörgen Sandström (b. 1971), musician
- Linn Sandström (born 1991), Brazilian-born Swedish-Australian professional boxer
- Marie-Louise Hänel Sandström (born 1968), Swedish politician
- Nils Sandström (1893–1973), athlete
- Runar Sandström (1909–1985), water polo player
- Sune Sandström (1939–2011), police commissioner
- Sven-David Sandström (1942–2019), composer
- Tomas Sandström (b. 1964), retired hockey player
- Tora Sandström (1886–1949), psychotherapist
- Ulf Sandström (b. 1964), pianist
- Ulf Sandström (b. 1967), retired hockey player
