= Aymard =

Aymard is a French given name and surname.

== Surname ==
- André Aymard (1900 – 1964), French historian
- Anthony Aymard (born 1988), French footballer
- Auguste Aymard (1808–1889), French prehistorian and palaeontologist
- Orianne Aymard, French mountaineer
- Béranger-Aymard Bossé, Central African athletics competitor

== Given name ==
- Aymard of Cluny
- Aymard Moro Mvé
- Aymard d'Ursel
- Jean Paul Charles Aymard Sartre, or Jean-Paul Sartre (1905–1980), French philosopher

== See also ==
- Aymar
