= Aivars =

Male given name

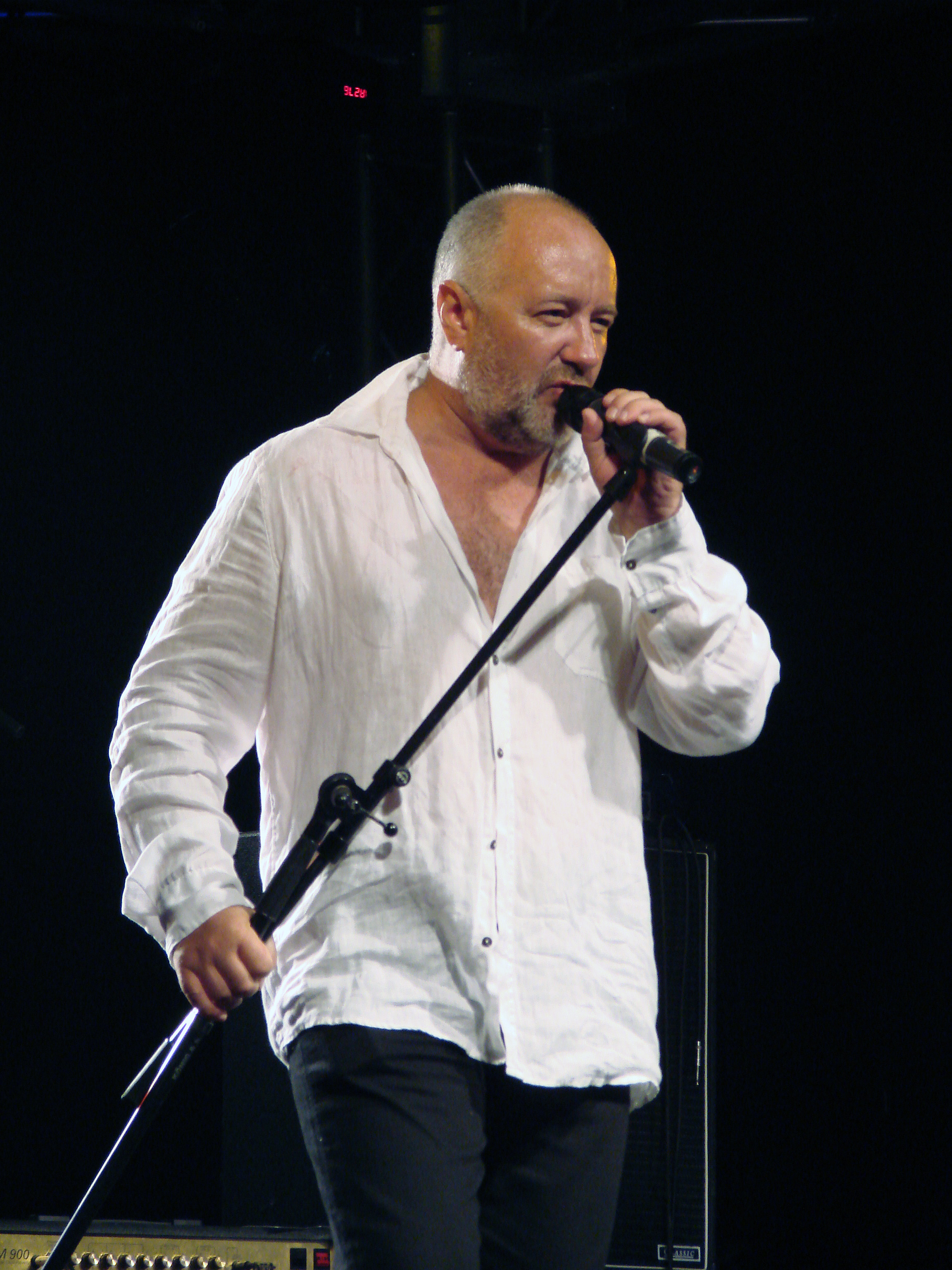
Aivars Brize.jpg

Aivars is a Latvian masculine given name. It is borne by over 13,000 men in Latvia and in 2006 was the sixth most popular man's name in the country. Its nameday is celebrated on 29 January.

Its rise to its present popularity began in the late 19th century when it was one of the very many names of Latvian origin either revived or invented during the Latvian National Awakening. It is a Latvian equivalent of the Old Scandinavian name Ivar, one of a group of Old Scandinavian names that first occurred in Courland between the 6th and 10th centuries, which in the more obviously Scandinavian form Ivars is borne by a further 9,900+ Latvians and in 2006 was the ninth most popular man's name.

- Aivar is the Estonian form of Aivars and Ivars
- Aivaras is a Lithuanian form of Aivars and Ivars.

Aivars can refer to:

- Aivars Aksenoks (born 1961), Latvian politician, mayor of Riga
- Aivars Drupass (1945–1999), Latvian footballer
- Aivars Endziņš (born 1940), Latvian lawyer and politician
- Aivars Gipslis (1937–2000), Latvian chess grandmaster
- Aivars Kalējs (born 1951), Latvian organist, composer and pianist
- Aivars Lazdenieks (born 1954), Latvian rower and Olympic competitor
- Aivars Leimanis (born 1958), Latvian ballet dancer
- Aivars Lembergs (born 1953), Latvian politician and businessman
- Aivars Šmaukstelis (born 1987), Latvian strongman

In fiction

- Aivars Aleksovitch Terekhov, a character in the Honor Harrington universe

== See also ==
- Ivars
- Aivis
- Aigars

== Sources ==
- Pilsonības un Migrācijas Lietu Parvalde (Office of Citizenship and Migration Affairs): personal name database (in Latvian)
- Siliņš, K., 1990: Latviešu personvārdu vārdnīca. Rīga: Zinātne. (in Latvian)
