= Prūsis =

Prūsis is a surname. Notable people with the surname include:

- Aigars Prūsis (born 1976), Latvian politician
- Sandis Prūsis (born 1965), Latvian bobsleigh coach and former bobsledder
