= Aiga =

Aiga may refer to:

- American Institute of Graphic Arts, an American professional organization
- Aiga (name), a personal name
- ‘aiga, the Samoan language word for "family"
- Aiga (Achaea), a town of ancient Achaea, Greece
