= Jesus Christians =

Christian millennialist network

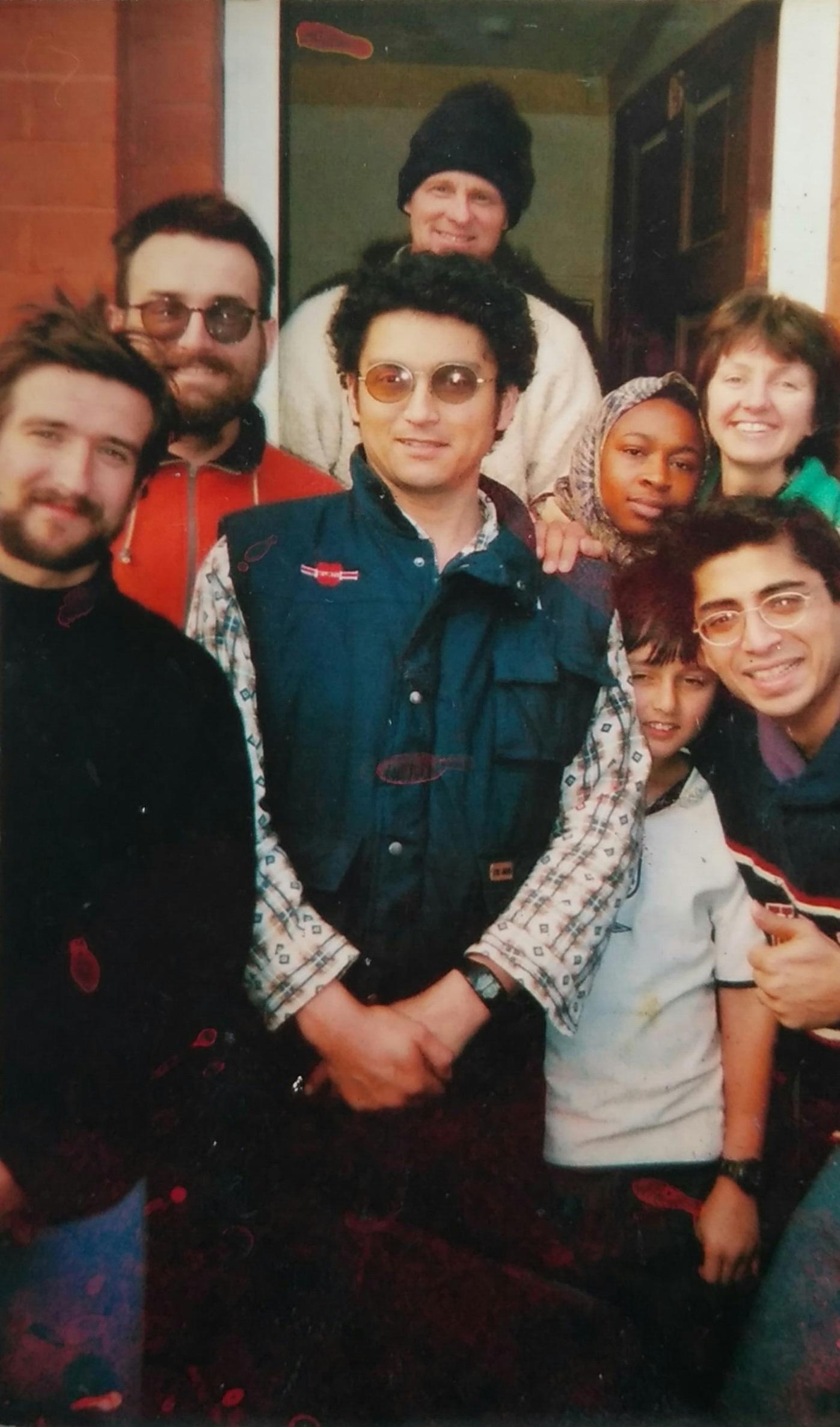
Jesus Christians in Manchester October 2005. Clockwise from left James (Alf) Montagu, Martin Filla, Ross Parry, Roland Gianstefani (centre), Susan Gianstefani, Ufuoma Emerhor, Barry Mendez, Daniel Gianstefani.

The Jesus Christians are a Christian millennialist network of intentional communities with groups on six continents, centered on a direct application of Jesus' teachings. In particular, they are known for their communal living, "forsaking all" personal possessions, "living by faith", and engaging in live altruistic organ donation to strangers; practices which have generated various controversies throughout their history.

== History and controversy ==
They were founded in Australia in 1981 by Dave and Cherry McKay, and have a three-decade-long history of controversy documented extensively by the media. Their core beliefs are based on the teachings of Jesus with special emphasis on his decree from the Sermon on the Mount, that his followers "cannot serve both God and money".

While they are often involved in volunteering and political activism their principal activity is evangelism, which they accomplish through the distribution of self-produced comics, books, pamphlets, and DVDs, and via videos published on YouTube and other social media. The majority of their publications are written by their co-founder, Dave McKay. The videos on their YouTube channel, A Voice in the Desert, were originally narrated by Dave McKay, but have since been narrated by other members of the community.

In 2010, the group announced that they had "disbanded". There was an organizational restructuring that led to the formation of independent communities, operating under different names, which maintained an affiliation with each other and with mutual collaboration on some projects. It was during this time period that some of the new communities began making YouTube videos as a way of disseminating their message.

In 2011, the community in South America launched a website, called Cómo Vivir Por Fe (How To Live By Faith) featuring Spanish translations of Jesus Christian material. In 2015, they started producing evangelistic videos for a Spanish-language Youtube channel of the same name. As of May 2023 the Cómo Vivir Por Fe YouTube channel has over 150,000 subscribers and over 11 million accumulated views on their videos.

In February 2016, some "disbanded" Jesus Christians collaborated to produce videos for the YouTube channel, End Time Survivors. Videos on the End Time Survivors YouTube channel featured anonymous presenters who faces were digitally altered or concealed with a mask. The only named presenter was "Brother Dave" who voiced the commentaries from the audio visual version of the Jesus Christian's apocalyptic novel, Survivors. Members and non-members alike participated in narrating videos on this channel. An accompanying website of the same name was also created in 2016.

The YouTube channel, 'A Voice in the Desert' was created in October 2016. It features sermons on a broad range of Christian topics usually delivered by Dave McKay. As of May 2023, A Voice in the Desert has over 140,000 subscribers and close to 13 million accumulated views. The group, which had been limited to about 30 members worldwide, reported a dramatic increase in numbers after starting its video ministry in 2016.

In 2019, the group was profiled for inclusion in the World Religions and Spirituality Project, which provides independent academic insight into the group, its beliefs, and history.

The history and activities of the Jesus Christians over the years have been extensively documented by both the group and the mainstream media, attracting both positive and negative attention. Some older newspaper articles were reproduced on the group's website, and where these are used below this is noted in the references.

=== Early days ===
The group was started in Melbourne, Australia, by Dave and Cherry McKay when Neville Williams moved in with the McKay family in early 1981. David McKay was a former associate of the Children of God but cut ties with the group following the revelation of heretical practices such as flirty fishing. The Jesus Christians operated under several names, including Christians, The Medowie Christian Volunteers, Australian Christian Volunteers, and Voices in the Wilderness. The name 'Jesus Christians' was selected in 1996. ("A Change of Name", August, 1996)

==== Free work ====
In 1983, Australian media followed members of the community who offered to do free work for one day for any family or business which requested their assistance.

==== Money burning ====
In 1984, group member Boyd Ellery was sentenced to three months prison in Sydney for burning an Australian dollar note in a statement about trusting God and not money. The protest was broadcast on national television by Mike Willisee.

==== Messages with money ====
In January 1985, the group glued Australian $2 notes to pavements to spell out messages against greed and money outside post offices around Victoria and New South Wales.

Christian messages also appeared written on a claimed AUS$100,000 worth of $2 notes in Sydney. The group claimed that as a result the federal police confiscated their mail until the NSW Council for Civil Liberties intervened.

==== Nullarbor walk ====
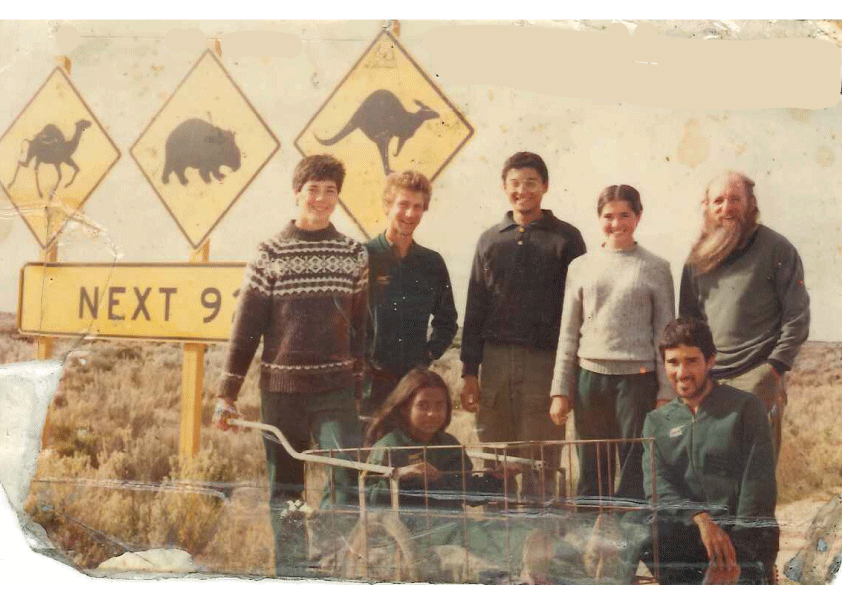
Nullarbor Walkers. Clockwise from top left: Gary McKay, Robin Dunn, Roland Gianstefani, Christine McKay, Dane Frick, Malcolm Wrest, Rachel Sukamaran.

In May and June 1985, six of the youngest members of the community, 12-year-old Rachel Sukamaran, Malcolm Wrest, Roland Gianstefani, Robin Dunn, and Gary McKay, headed by 15-year-old Christine McKay, walked 1,000 miles across the Nullarbor Desert in the interior of Australia without taking any money, provisions, or support vehicle for their journey, prompting controversy and media interest. A book based on the diaries of the Nullarbor Walkers was published in 1985 by John Sands, shortly after the walk was completed. An Easy English version of the diaries was later published by New Century Book House (India) and Smashwords.

==== Fall of America prophecy ====
In 1990, members of the group travelled to the United States to hand out 290,000 booklets entitled "The Fall of America". prophesying America's destruction. They wore T-shirts with an upside down American flag (as a symbol of distress) and the caption "Pride Goeth Before a Fall".

==== India ====
In 1994, Rob and Christine Dunn, Gary, Dave and Cherry McKay, Ross Parry, Rachel Sukamaran, Paul, Craig, Kevin, Rols, Sue, Sinni, Liz, Boyd, Chris, Roshini, and Sheri were among Jesus Christian members who voluntarily cleaned sewers and toilets in India. After one protest, where members stood in the sewer for a week to draw attention to the filth that spread disease, Craig Hendry contracted typhoid.

In 1995, the Jesus Christians converted a section of open sewer in Chennai into a children's playground. The real estate created by covering the sewer was estimated to be worth AUD $950,000. After one year, the project was handed over to Indian charities to run; However the Indian government eventually demolished the site because it had been built on government land without permission.

==== Nappy Chappies / Children of God ====
In April 1997 and 1998, several Jesus Christians were arrested at the Royal Easter Show in Sydney dressed as babies in over-sized nappies while distributing "The Baby Books", highlighting how Jesus said his followers need to become like children to enter into God's Kingdom. The introduction of the books stated "We are children of God", which led to confusion about the group being the same as the Children of God group started by David Berg. This continuing confusion can be seen in a 2013 article which uses a photograph of the "Nappy Chappies" labelled as the Children of God.

==== Split ====
In 1998, there was a split in the community. Craig and Yesamma Hendry and their family, Kevin and Elisabeth McKay, Boyd and Sheri Ellery and their family, Darren and Donna Cooke, Ray Sippel, Josh, and Tim left the community in Australia. Boyd wrote to the remaining community "The Spirit you are following is not Christ's. We will have no part of your hierarchies and fleshly importance." The remaining community were "encouraged to avoid private correspondence or discussions with them..."

==== Kyri and Berni Sheridan ====
In July 1999, 19-year-old Kyri Sheridan joined the Jesus Christians in the UK. His mother reported him missing to the Guildford Police in Surrey. Kyri presented himself at the Guildford police station to state that he was not actually "missing". The police confirmed Kyri was happy and making his own decision to be with the Jesus Christians. When his mother held Kyri to stop him from leaving, she was pinned down, handcuffed, and arrested by the police. This incident led to the first media report about the group in the UK, featuring comments from Graham Baldwin and labelling the group as a "cult".

=== 2000–2010 ===
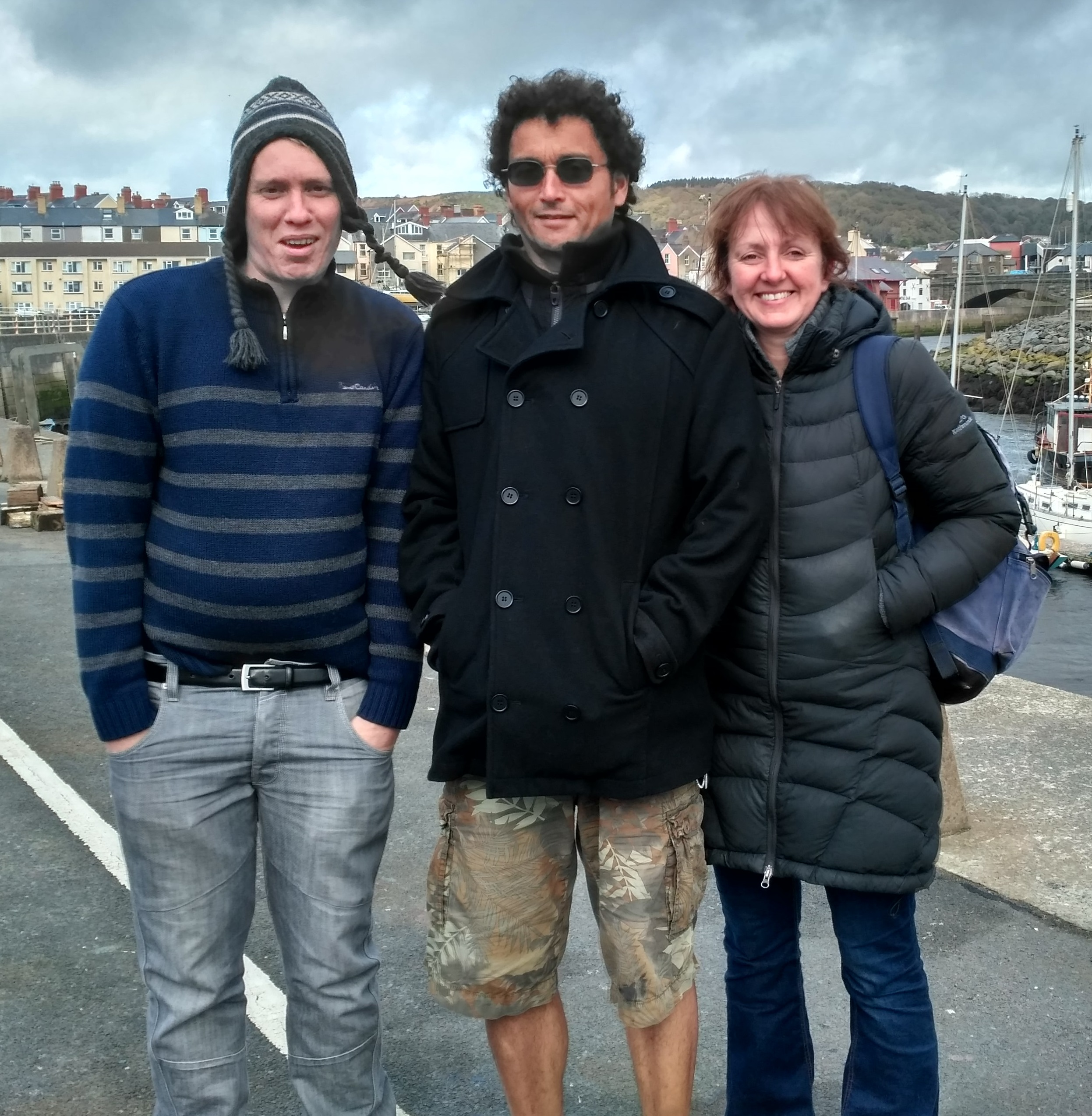
Bobby Kelly (left) caused a British tabloid media frenzy by "disappearing" with the religious group "Jesus Christians" in June 2000 as a teenager. 17 years later, Bobby poses with friends Roland and Sue Gianstefani, who were convicted of contempt for refusing to reveal his whereabouts to a High Court judge.

==== Bobby Kelly controversy ====
On 14 July 2000, the group was splashed across the front page of the British tabloid Daily Express, which declared that members Susan and Roland Gianstefani had kidnapped a 16-year-old boy, Bobby Kelly. Bobby had picked up a Jesus Christians cartoon book called The Liberator in Romford High Street, Essex near the end of June 2000, and gone home to tell his grandmother about the Christian man he met. Bobby went out again that afternoon and returned to tell his grandmother he wanted to join the Jesus Christians. A few days later, "an Australian couple with their young son, a German, and two English men" from the group visited and met Bobby's grandmother. In the first two weeks of July, while Bobby was with the group and before the scandal had hit the headlines, Bobby visited his youth worker from St. Peters Anglican Church in Harold Wood. He had previously attended that church. The youth worker, David Whitehouse, told the press a week later, "The group has a veneer of respectability, but there is something very disturbing about them. When I saw Bobby a week ago, he was with three of them, and he seemed very scared, which was unlike him".

Sometime before July 14, David Whitehouse, "the family friend who helped set up the rescue effort", and "who suspected that something was wrong, and did something to try to save him" had been in contact with anti-cult "exit-counseller" Graham Baldwin, described in the media as Whitehouse's friend. Baldwin formed and directs the charity Catalyst, which helps families of people involved in groups labelled as "cults". Baldwin put Whitehouse in contact with Clare Kirby, a solicitor who "specialises in cases against cults", and who has worked with Baldwin in other cases. They then began moves to advise Bobby Kelly's grandmother to have Bobby made a ward of the court. Graham Baldwin also advised David Whitehouse to give Bobby Kelly the impression that everything was normal until the solicitor succeeded in getting the emergency High Court action to try to "rescue the schoolboy". Neither Bobby Kelly's grandmother nor any other relative or friend told him to come back home nor that there was an issue with him being with the Jesus Christians "until it was all in the newspapers".

The front page newspaper report in The Express was published two weeks after Bobby first met the Jesus Christians with the story that Bobby had "disappeared" after he met the group: "Within hours Bobby had forsaken his possessions and moved in with the group. The police were called and the airports and docks were put on the highest alert". After The Express broke the story, instead of handing the boy over to the police, the Jesus Christians with Bobby "in tow", panicked and went "on the run". The UK Jesus Christians became fugitives for two weeks.

When the Jesus Christians could not be found in the nationwide search, and when Bobby started doing telephone interviews with the media declaring that he had not been kidnapped, an emergency court ruling was made banning the broadcast of interviews with Bobby or the group, which the BBC successfully challenged, considering it to be a case of "extreme censorship".

Bobby was eventually located hiding out with two Jesus Christian men, including Reinhard Zeuner, in a Hampshire forest, and placed in a foster home. No members of the Jesus Christians were charged with kidnapping but a charge of contempt of court (for failing to answer questions from the High Court judge) resulted in six-month sentences for Susan and Roland Gianstefani. The solicitor for the Gianstefani's told the court that the Gianstefani's feared Bobby might be subjected to the deprogramming of his religious beliefs if they had revealed his whereabouts. Minutes before the Gianstefanis were due to be sentenced, Bobby, who was kept in a separate room at the High Court, sent a note to the judge through the representative of the Official Solicitor saying that the Gianstefani's had acted nobly and they feared he (Bobby) might be subjected to the deprogramming of his religious beliefs if they had revealed his whereabouts. Bobby said: "I hope they don't get into trouble. They were willing to go to prison for me". The Gianstefanis' sentences were suspended after Bobby had pleaded with the judge in their defence.

In 2003, Jon Ronson, briefly interviewed Bobby Kelly about his alleged abduction, in his Channel 4 documentary Kidneys for Jesus. Bobby clearly states, "I definitely wasn't kidnapped..." and that media coverage about the alleged kidnapping was "absolutely stupid, and silly, and just, over the top big time".

In May 2010, the Jesus Christians interviewed Bobby Kelly personally. Bobby explains in detail what happened while he was visiting with the Jesus Christians, the lies that were told to his grandmother to convince her to sign over her guardianship for him to become a ward of court, and the effect the lies, and living with a foster family with restricted access to his grandmother, had on his life over the next years.

In October 2017 Roland and Susan Gianstefani had a live radio interview with Bobby Kelly on a Welsh radio station where they discussed their life and the controversies they were involved in when they were a part of the Jesus Christians community.

==== Kidney donations ====
As of 2024, around thirty Jesus Christian members had altruistically donated a kidney, thus earning them the nickname 'the kidney cult'.

In January 2003, Jon Ronson's documentary, Kidneys for Jesus, aired on Channel 4 in the UK. After an invitation from Dave McKay, Jon Ronson followed the group over a year as they attempted to donate their kidneys to strangers in the UK and the US. The successful donations of members Casey Crouch, Robin Dunn and Susan Gianstefani are featured. The film also documents the tension that arose between Ronson and McKay during filming: McKay became increasingly concerned that Ronson was portraying the Jesus Christians in a poor light and Ronson was concerned about McKay's ideas to try to manipulate a media storm around the donations as well as his role in the decisions made by members to donate kidneys.

In 2004, the group made headlines in Australia when McKay revealed that members in Australia had lied to health authorities in order to be able to donate their kidneys.

In June 2007, the Australian Broadcasting Corporation's Australian Story broadcast the first of a two-part report on Ash Falkingham's fight for his right to donate a kidney to a stranger. The documentary, "Ash's Anatomy", covers the attempts of his parents to thwart his attempts to donate a kidney. The follow-up report, "Body and Soul", broadcast in June 2008 follows Ash's continued attempt, and his final success, at donating his kidney. Ash left the community shortly after donating to work restoring bicycles for a charity.

==== Kenya abduction charges ====
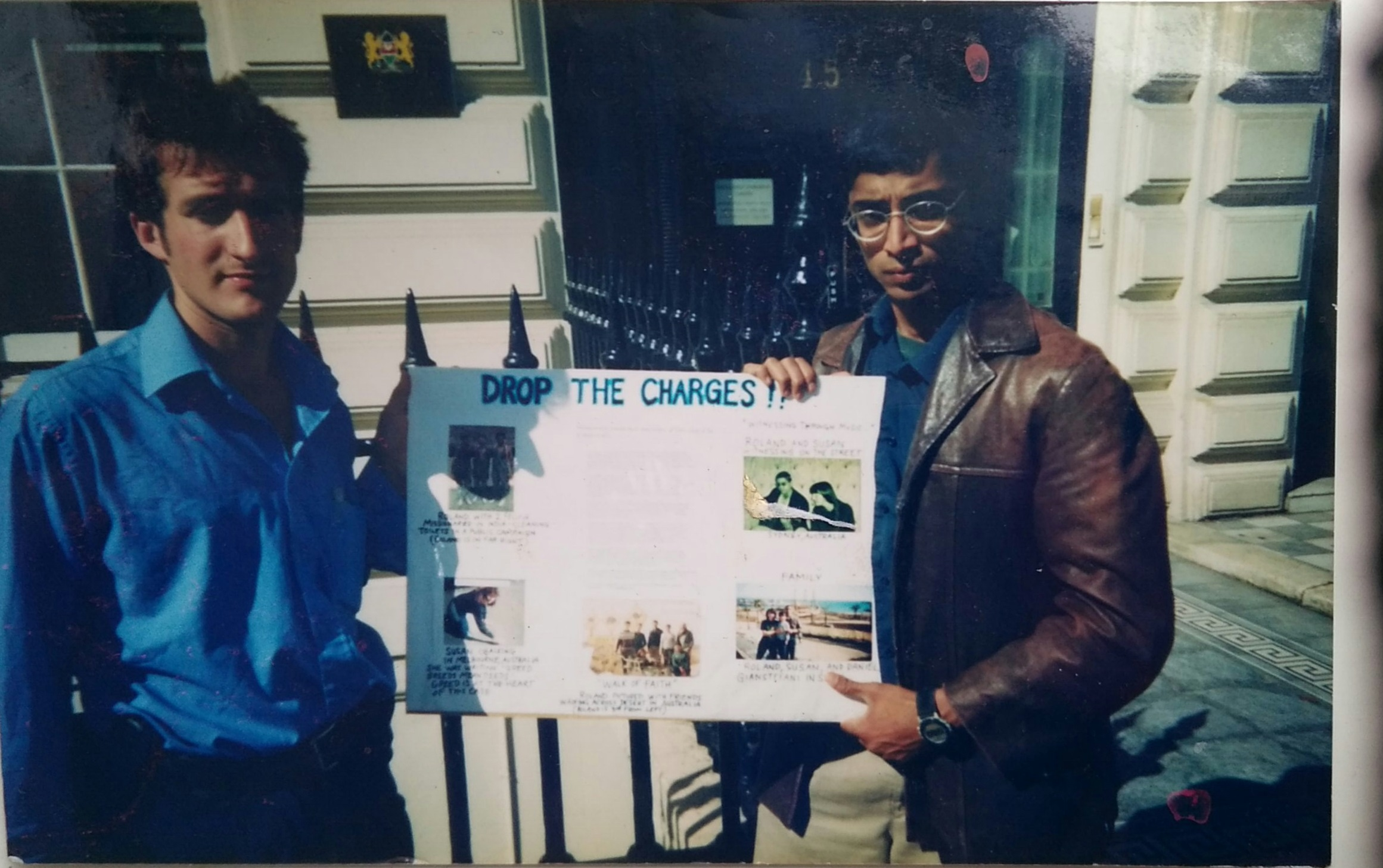
Jesus Christians James Montagu and Barry Mendez campaigning outside the Kenyan High Commission in London in July 2005 for the charges against Roland and Susan Gianstefani to be dropped

In 2005, a charge of abduction was made against Roland and Susan Gianstefani in Kenya, this time by the father of a 27-year-old single mother Betty Njoroge, who had joined the community with her 7-year-old son. The woman released a video on the group's website declaring that she and her son had not been kidnapped, and that her father was responsible for the case being pursued as he wanted custody of her son. Roland Gianstefani was arrested, questioned by police, and held for several days without charge until the Australian embassy insisted he be charged or released. Roland and his wife Susan were charged and Roland was held in a remand prison in Nairobi until 600,000 Kenyan shillings bail was paid. The charges against him and Susan were dropped when Betty Njoroge appeared in court and presented an affidavit confirming she was acting of her own free will. Roland contracted tuberculosis in prison and Susan, who had earlier told the media that she and her husband would never stoop to bribery, not even to save their lives, claimed she had to resort to bribery to get basic amenities provided for Roland from the prison guards.

==== Californian whipping trial ====
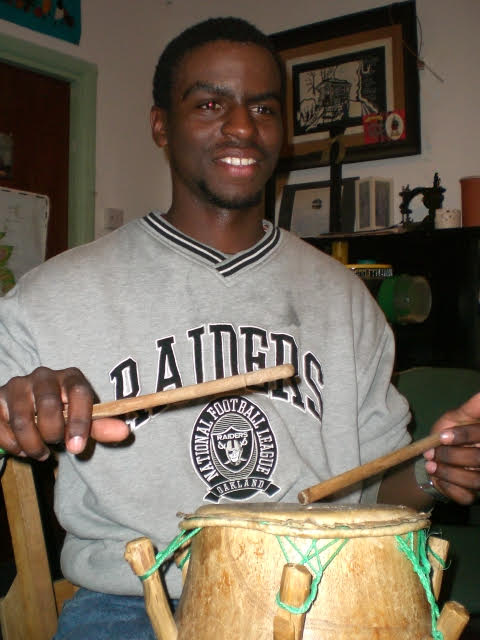
Jesus Christian, Joseph Johnson, South London, 2006

In October 2006, Jesus Christians in the United States, along with Dave and Cherry McKay, held a mock trial in Long Beach, California where they charged the parents and two brothers of one of their members, Joseph Johnson, with attempted murder and with aiding and abetting others in doing this. It followed an attack on one of their members, Reinhard Zeuner, in which he received a fractured spine, bleeding on the brain, broken teeth, and numerous cuts to the head and face. An amateur video was made of the attack but the police never prosecuted the case. Although the family did not attend the trial, various sentences of 5–25 lashes of the whip were carried out on volunteers from the Jesus Christians themselves, as an attempt to illustrate their understanding of the cross of Christ. "God hates the sin, but loves the sinner", they said, in an effort to summarize what they were doing. ("The Trial")

==== The Jeremy Kyle Show ====
On 11 December 2007, Dave and Cherry McKay and Roland and Susan Gianstefani were interviewed on stage as part of a two-day feature on religious cults on the UK television programme The Jeremy Kyle Show. The show attempted to link the Jesus Christians with such groups as Jim Jones' People's Temple and the Children of God. Dave, Cherry, Roland, and Sue were questioned by Jeremy Kyle and opponents of David McKay. At one point, due to the nature of the questioning, Dave McKay refused to reply to any more questions and walked out of the interview, then returned to say "Just let them do their thing".

==== Freeganism and Wife Swap show ====
In February 2008, Roland, Susan, and Daniel Gianstefani were featured on the Channel 4 program Wife Swap, where freegan Susan went to live with the millionaire family of an IT consultant.

==== Gianstefanis leave ====
In August 2010, long term members Roland, Susan, and Daniel Gianstefani left the community after "numerous tensions over their parenting skills". This followed "a number of community discussions", according to the Jesus Christians Newsletter. Susan and Roland had been members of the group for more than twenty years.

==== "Disbanding" ====
In November 2010 the Jesus Christians announced that they had "disbanded", though there was some confusion with regard to what that meant for the continuing organisation of members of the Jesus Christians.

Following this announcement, long-term members Roland and Sue Gianstefani and Ross Parry, claimed they had been excommunicated, and later shunned, for objecting to the changes in which they believed the group was to operate. Another member, Alan Wright, later claimed he was disfellowshipped from the group for refusing to sue his wife for more money in a divorce settlement.

Roland and Susan Gianstefani, went on to establish their current ministry, Making It Real, which is focused primarily on anti-war and human rights activism, and promoting altruistic organ donation.

=== 2011–present ===
==== End Time Survivors and A Voice in the Desert ====
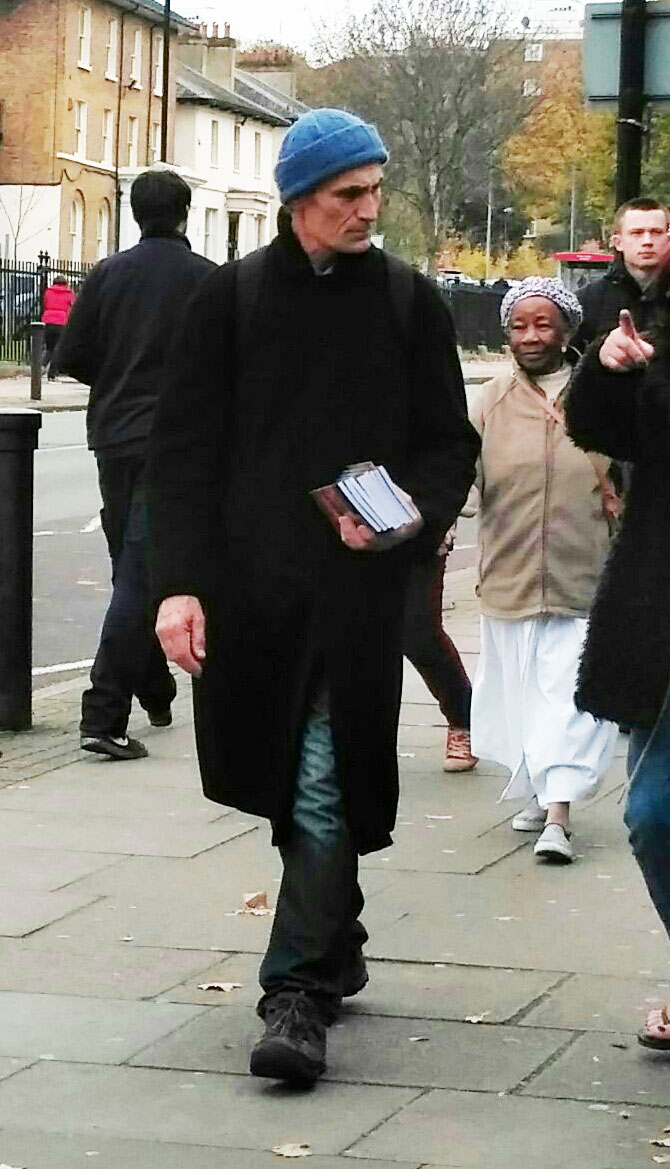

In February 2016, new and old members of the affiliated ex-Jesus Christian communities launched a YouTube channel called 'End Time Survivors', which focused on teachings about the End Times. The videos were presented by 'anonymous' narrators, using masks and digitally altered voices, and included both members and non-members of the affiliated communities.

An accompanying website of the same name was also launched in conjunction with the YouTube channel.

In October 2016 another YouTube channel was launched, 'A Voice in the Desert'. The videos primarily featured Dave as narrator of teaching videos on topics of a more general spiritual nature. The group, which had been limited to about 30 members worldwide for decades, reported a dramatic increase in numbers after starting its video ministry in 2016. As of May 2023, A Voice in the Desert channel had over 140,000 subscribers and close to 13 million accumulated views.

==== Academic interest ====
On December 7, 2017, at the annual conference of the Australian Association for the Study of Religion in Sydney, Australia, Geraldine Smith presented an academic paper accompanied by formal discussion about the new religious movement that Dave and Cherry McKay founded in the 1980s.

In 2018, after considerable research, interviews and observations made while visiting and participating in activities with the group, Smith submitted a thesis to the University of Sydney in partial completion of the requirements for her degree of Bachelor of Arts (Honours), called: Voices In The Wilderness: An Ethnography Of The Endtime Survivors. Along with the history and controversies related to the Jesus Christians, Smith reveals an intimate look at how members live their day to day, and how the group restructured internationally in 2010.

In May 2019, a shortened excerpt of Geraldine Smith's longer thesis was published on the World Religions and Spirituality Project web site.

In May 2025, Massimo Introvigne and María Vardé published an in-depth academic article on the group titled: The Jesus Christians: History, Theology, Controversies which was published in The Journal of CESNUR The article expands on some key topics covered by Smith's ethnography along with detailed information on controversies that occurred after 2018, including two failed deprogramming attempts and false accusations of human trafficking by anti-cultists.

A series of articles based on this work was also published in the religious liberty and human rights magazine Bitter Winter.

==== Regrouping ====
In August 2019, a video was published on the YouTube channel A Voice in the Desert explaining that although the Jesus Christians had formed separate ministries in 2010, due to the influx of people wanting to be part of the movement as a result of the success of the channel, many of the teams and former members of the Jesus Christians agreed to use the Jesus Christians name to represent the wider movement. Along with this announcement the Jesus Christian website, which had been largely dormant for nine years, was reinstituted and now included material published on the A Voice in the Desert YouTube channel.

Also in 2019, the Jesus Christians protested the arrest of Paul Mackenzie, leader of Good News International Ministries on the grounds of religious liberty relating to his stance against the Huduma Namba biometric ID card.

==== Human trafficking allegations in Argentina ====
In March 2021, Pablo Salum founder of "LibreMentes" (Free Minds in English), an Argentine anti-cult organisation, filed a criminal complaint against the group in Argentina together with family members of two people who had contact with the Argentine community; a 30-year-old woman who had joined the community and a young man who had only visited the community in 2020. Salum's legal complaint accused the leadership of the Argentine community of human rights violations, claiming their practices of intentional community and volunteerism amounted to human trafficking and labor exploitation, and that their prior altruistic kidney donations were akin to organ trafficking.

A police raid was conducted at the properties of the community in Buenos Aires as part of the investigation that had been initiated by Pablo Salum's complaints.

In the days immediately following the raid, Pablo Salum garnered significant media attention in Argentina with the claims of human and organ trafficking, and labour exploitation. Family members of the woman who had recently joined the group participated in many of the media interviews.

The community in Argentina was investigated for a total period of close to two years. During the course of the investigation it was discovered that there was no evidence for any of the allegations made against the Argentine community, nor of any other crime. The court ruling highlighted that Pablo Salum had prejudicially influenced the judicial testimony of the young man who had visited the group in 2020, stating:

The court cannot ignore, as the defense also emphasizes, the proven interference of the aforementioned Pablo Salum in the testimony. This is because he interviewed the young man before he testified and such interview evidences that the former had already formed a negative opinion about the work of the religious community and undoubtedly influenced the analysis that the witness gave to the court.

It was also noted that the young man's testimony against the community did not include any evidence of any of the allegations made against the group.

Upon completing the investigation against the community the case was dismissed by the presiding judge, "noting that the facts in question do not constitute a crime, it is appropriate to order the closing of the present proceedings," and, "To close the present proceedings for not being able to find the commission of the crime denounced." The case was closed without any charges having been made, due to no evidence presented or found to justify an imputation.

Following the closure of the case, the Argentine community created a new YouTube channel called Corona de Espinas ('Crown of Thorns' in English) where they published several videos explaining what had happened and highlighting the court's ruling.

In July 2024, a conference was held in the Palace of Legislature of Buenos Aires discussing the anti-cult movements' increasing use of human trafficking laws as a tool for religious persecution. Titled, Discrimination and Criminalization for Religious and Spiritual Reasons in Argentina, the conference included a presentation by the Argentine community detailing the accusations which had been brought against them by Pablo Salum. Several academics in the field of anthropology, sociology and freedom of religion and conscience participated, including Massimo Introvigne, founder of CESNUR, Dr Alejandro Frigerio from the National Scientific and Technical Research Council (IICS-UCA/CONICET), and Rosita ŠORYTĖ from the European Federation for the Freedom of Belief.

==== "Strange Bedfellows" video and defamation case ====
In June, 2021, a video titled "Strange Bedfellows" was published on the Voice in the Desert YouTube channel, discussing Jesus Christian allegations that they were the recipients of coordinated opposition from several parents of adult members of the group. The video stressed that these parents had widely diverse religious views. In particular, it mentioned parents of three different Jesus Christian members, identifying one set of parents as Neo-Nazi, another as Pentecostal Christians, who had previously physically attacked a Jesus Christian member, (Refer to #California Whipping Trial) and an Australian mother whom they referred to as "a Luciferian, a Satanist if you like". They based their claim on letters from the mother to her daughter, in which she wrote about her many years studying, amongst other things, witchcraft, and other spiritual beliefs, including "occult, esoteric traditions, ancient mysteries", and considering Lucifer "a catalyst for finding the true light of Christ."

This mother, Renee Spencer, identified only as "Renee" in the video, felt that her reputation and her relationship with her daughter had been ruined by such an accusation, so she sued David McKay in the Victorian (Australia) civil courts for defamation. The case went to trial in September 2023. McKay was unrepresented, as he could not afford a lawyer, and no court-appointed lawyer was available. McKay was not allowed to give testimony in his own defense, as he said that he could not in good conscience affirm the court oath due to the "whole truth" clause, stating, "I am quite happy to say that I will try to be totally honest in everything I say today and I understand that there are penalties if I knowingly do not do that. The reason for wanting to word it that way is that I can't honestly tell you that I would say the whole truth and I don't think the court wants to hear the whole truth"

In December, 2023, Judge Julie Clayton ruled that McKay had acted maliciously in defaming Renee Spencer, but also noted that, "it is likely that the allegation caused harm to Ms Spencer's reputation within the Jesus Christians but it is unlikely that her reputation will be damaged more broadly, including in her professional life." Renee Spencer was awarded $85,000 in damages and McKay was ordered to edit the video to remove any reference to Ms. Spencer, as well as some additional words and imagery.

==== Spotlight documentary ====
The Jesus Christians were featured on the May 19, 2024 episode of the Australian channel Seven News program Spotlight. The documentary featured a meeting between Renee Spencer and her daughter Ellicia, a 29-year-old Jesus Christian member, in an attempt to reestablish the relationship between the two after having been semi-estranged for a number of years.

The documentary included complaints from a family in New South Wales, Australia, that they had not seen their son for several years, subsequent to him leaving home at 18 to join the group in December, 2019. Due to their son not wanting to divulge his whereabouts to them, they resorted to hiring a private investigator to find out where he was living, who filmed him without his knowledge. Some of that footage was used in the Spotlight documentary.

The documentary finishes with questions about Dave McKay's possible association with Paul Mackenzie, leader of Good News International Ministries in Kenya, who was arrested in April, 2023, for the murder and incitement to suicide of over 400 members of his church, in what has been referred to as the Shakahola Forest Incident. Dave and Cherry McKay deny ever having had any kind of contact with Paul Mackenzie, although they acknowledge that a Jesus Christian member had brief contact with Paul Mackenzie in mid-2019 when he preached at Mackenzie's church in Nairobi, Kenya. Jesus Christians categorically denied that the sermon had any relation to the decisions taken by Paul Mackenzie and the members of his church four years later in the Shakahola Incident.

Previous to release of the Channel 7 Spotlight report on YouTube, the Jesus Christians had published, on "A Voice in the Desert", an exposé of the allegations made against them regarding the Shakahola Incident. Four videos responding to the claims made in the Spotlight program are published on their YouTube channel, which include a video from Ellicia voicing her views on the relationship between herself and her mother. They also include recordings of the full "master" interviews which were filmed by Channel 7. These recordings showed additional information and context that was omitted from the Spotlight documentary.

== Beliefs and teachings ==
The Jesus Christians believe that discipleship—the practical application in ones daily life of the teachings of Jesus—is the basic requirement for anyone who would claim to be a Christian.

They do not teach anything unique, however they do put some concepts and practices together in a way that is different to most, if not all other, denominations.

Below is a list of some of their core principles and beliefs.

=== Obedience to Jesus ===
The Jesus Christians believe that the practical application in one's life of the teachings of Jesus is fundamental.They base this on Jesus' words from the gospels such as from John 8:31:

"So Jesus said to the Jews who believed in him, "If you continue to obey my teaching, you are truly my followers..."

John 14:15–23: "If you love me, you will obey my commandments... Whoever knows and obeys my commandments is the person who loves me. Those who love me will have my Father's love, and I, too, will love them and show myself to them."

Matthew 7:21–27: "Not everyone who says to me, 'Lord, Lord!' will enter the kingdom of heaven, but only the person who does what my Father in heaven wants... Therefore, everyone who hears what I say and obeys it will be like a wise person who built a house on rock. Rain poured, and floods came. Winds blew and beat against that house. But it did not collapse, because its foundation was on rock.

"Everyone who hears what I say but doesn't obey it will be like a foolish person who built a house on sand. Rain poured, and floods came. Winds blew and struck that house. It collapsed, and the result was a total disaster" (from Matthew 7:21–27).

=== Living by faith (and not working for money) ===
They teach that God will provide the material needs of people who stop working for money, and dedicate their lives to obeying the teachings of Jesus. (21. "A Unique Teaching", circa 1996)

=== Forsaking all ===
Among other teachings of Jesus, they take what Jesus says in Luke 14:33 literally: "In the same way, those of you who do not give up everything you have cannot be my disciples." (Luke 14:33) "Jesus expects his followers to give up all their worldly wealth. ("How to Be Saved")

=== Jesus is the Word of God ===
The Jesus Christians believe that Jesus (not the Bible) is the Word of God. They believe that while holy writings may be inspired by God, they are not infallible, being as they are, written by people. ("The Word of God", Jesus Christians, August, 1995)

The teachings of Jesus, not religious traditions, should be the basis of faith. ("We Believe in Jesus Christ", circa 2000)

=== Sincerity ===
They believe that sincerity is paramount as opposed to doctrinal perfection. They believe that non-Christians can be saved on the basis of their spiritual sincerity, even if they have never heard of Jesus and that this was made possible through the death of Jesus on the cross. See Inclusivism.

They believe that individual sincerity is more important spiritually than being theologically correct. ("The Good Hindu") ("In Search of Truth", November, 1986)

=== The Mark of the Beast ===
They believe that the technology needed to implement the "Mark of the Beast" is now in existence in the form of microchipped ID cards and subdermal RFID chips.

Economic, technological and political developments are all moving towards a one world government, under the control of The Antichrist.

The world's population will become trapped in a global system of control because they are unable to forsake their attachment to money.

The return of Jesus is likely to occur soon, although not until after the Great Tribulation. ("Signs of the Times", June 1986)

Christians will judge the world after Jesus returns, and Jesus will reign over the world for a thousand years.

=== Grievances ===
Resolving differences through what they refer to as the 'grievance system' is a very strong teaching within Jesus Christian communities based on Matthew 18:15–17.

=== Living communally ===
Like the early Christians, the Jesus Christians do not have private ownership in their communities (Act 2:44–45, 4:32–35), but share money and possessions communally.

=== Accountability ===
Accountability to each other is seen as an important part of everyday life, due to the understanding that is fosters greater unity, and as such, it is the responsibility of each member to keep themselves accountable and to keep others accountable when necessary.

=== Secret piety ===
Based on Matthew 6:1–18, Jesus Christian members do not pray audibly when in the presence of other people. Fasting and giving to the poor are also practices to be carried out in secret, ideally without the knowledge of other people.

=== Equality and not using titles ===
The Jesus Christians have no special titles for any members of their community, as they believe and follow the concept of the equality of all believers, and that they "are all brothers", as described by Jesus in the 23rd chapter of the Gospel of Matthew.

In this same chapter, Jesus instructs his followers to "call no man on earth Father", nor "Master", nor "Teacher"; therefore, the Jesus Christians refuse to use all titles, including "Mr", "Sir", "Dr" and even "Dad" and "Mom".

=== Pacifism and non-violence ===
Jesus taught his followers that they need to "love your enemies" in Luke 6:27. The Jesus Christians teach and try to practice "turning the other cheek". (Matthew 5:38–40)

=== Celibacy/chastity ===
The Jesus Christians teach that it is better to remain single and that sex is not allowed before marriage.

They believe there are spiritual advantages to remaining single; however, marriage is not forbidden although it is regarded as an inferior option to celibacy.

=== No divorce and re-marriage ===
The Jesus Christians believe that Jesus allows for divorce but not for remarriage. They teach that a divorced person is to remain single, based on Jesus' teaching in the 5th chapter of the Gospel of Matthew (Matthew 5:31–32).

=== Masturbation ===
The Jesus Christians believe and teach that there is nothing sinful about masturbation. ("Wanking, the Last Taboo")

Jesus Christians see masturbation as a legitimate way to release sexual tension and the key to remaining celibate.

=== Water baptism ===
Jesus Christians do not believe that water baptism is necessary for salvation, and that the decision to be water baptised should be determined by the individual and their conscience. The Jesus Christians quote John the Baptist and Jesus in affirming that John's baptism was with water but that the baptism of Jesus Christ is with the Holy Spirit (Luke 3:16, Acts 1:4–5). They understand "The Great Commission" to mean that we "cover" or 'baptise' people with the teachings of Jesus

=== The Trinity ===
The Jesus Christians hold that beliefs about the doctrine of the Trinity are of little consequence spiritually. (Refer to "Sincerity") ("Father and Son—Two for One", January, 1994)

== Practices ==
After a process of discernment, people who make a decision to join the Jesus Christians community forsake all private ownership of possessions. People choose to sell their possessions and give the proceeds to the Jesus Christians community, or to give the proceeds to charity. This follows the model practiced by the first Christians in the book of Acts. (Acts 2:42–45, Acts 4:32–35) ("Forsaking All", from Jesus and Money)

All members of the community have equal say in how funds are to be used. ("Power—Good or Evil", and "Setting Up Your Own Community")

== Publications ==
Survivors is a response to the popular Left Behind series of novels on Bible prophecy, written by Tim LaHaye and Jerry Jenkins. It was first published in 2001. In its own words, Survivors attempts to include material that was left out of the LaHaye-Jenkins series. In 2006, they reported that sales for this book had exceeded one million.

McKay has also published a second book in the series, entitled Listening. It purports to be an "equel" (sic) to Survivors, taking place during the same time period, although from another viewpoint. A third book, also set during the same time period as the first two, is entitled Destroyers. It is also available on the JC website, and was released in paperback form at around Christmas 2008. The story for that mostly takes place in Kenya and is told through the perspective of someone who takes the mark of the beast (Destroyers [2014 Paper back edition] Chapter 17 – "Implanted". Page 98.)

As of 2009, the Jesus Christians had produced several videos, including a documentary expounding on various aspects of their lifestyle. They had also produced several music videos. Their latest videos included a documentary (The Tyrant Within) about the implementation of RFID microchip implants and a video about the justice system, its effect on society and a radical Christian approach to mixing justice with mercy (Beyond Justice).

=== Books by David McKay ===
- Without Thought for Food or Clothing 1985 ISBN 0-9589327-0-0 (Also available as "Walk of Faith" on www.smashwords.com).
- Bin Raiders copyright 2000 (also available from the Jesus Christians website)
- Armageddon for Beginners, copyright 1999 ISBN 9966-755-14-4. (Also published as Not for Everyone by Anonymous ISBN 9966-755-14-4.)
- Survivors, copyright 2002 ISBN 9966-755-00-4.
- Strong Meat, copyright 2003 (Note: Articles in the book are contained in the section of the same name, on the Jesus Christian website.)
- Listening, copyright 2008 ISBN 9966-755-40-3.
- Destroyers, copyright 2008 ISBN 9966-755-42-X.

=== Jesus Christian pamphlets ===
- Jeremiah's Lament – A modern paraphrase of the Book of Jeremiah.
- Christian...but not religious!
- Radical Christian Truths. ISBN 9966-755-15-2
- Churchianity vs Christianity.
