= Ulf Sandström =

Ulf Sandström may refer to:

- Ulf Sandström (professor) (born 1953), Swedish professor in social science
- Ulf Sandström (pianist) (born 1964), Swedish pianist
- Ulf Sandström (ice hockey) (born 1967), Swedish ice hockey player
