= Ivar Johansson =

Ivar Johansson may refer to:

- Ivar Johansson (director) (1889–1963), Swedish film director
- Ivar Johansson (politician) (1899–1994), Swedish politician
- Ivar Johansson (wrestler) (1903–1979), Swedish wrestler
