= Evar =

In medicine, Evar or EVAR may refer to:

- Endovascular aneurysm repair or Endovascular repair of abdominal aortic aneurysm

EVaR may refer to:

- Entropic value at risk

People with the name Evar include:

- Evar Swanson (1902–1973), American football and baseball player
- Evar Saar (born 1969), Estonian linguist
- Evar Orbus, fictional character from the Star Wars expanded universe

== See also ==
- Ever (disambiguation)
- Ivar (disambiguation)
