= Ivar Johansen =

Ivar Johansen or Johansson may refer to:

- Ivar Johansen (bobsledder) (1910–1984), Norwegian bobsledder
- Ivar Johansen (journalist) (1923–2005), Norwegian journalist
- Ravi (Ivar Johansen) (born 1976), Norwegian singer
- Ivar Johansson (wrestler) (1903–1979), Swedish wrestler
- Ivar Johansson (politician) (1899–unknown), Swedish politician
