= Aivaras =

- Gender: Male
- Name day: 19 January

Origin
- Region of origin: Lithuania

Other names
- Related names: Aivar, Aivars

Aivaras is a Lithuanian masculine given name and may refer to:

- Aivaras Abromavičius (born 1976), Lithuanian-born Ukrainian businessman and investment banker
- Aivaras Balžekas (1982–2005), Lithuanian tennis player
- Aivaras Baranauskas (born 1980), Lithuanian professional track cyclist and Olympic competitor
- Aivaras Bendžius (born 1993), Lithuanian hockey player
- Aivaras Laurišas (born 1977), Lithuanian footballer
- Aivaras Stepukonis (born 1972), Lithuanian singer-songwriter, musician and philosopher
