= Aimar =

Aimar may refer to:

- Aimar (name), a given name and surname
- Aimar, Georgia, United States, an unincorporated community
