= Alleizettella =

Scientific classification
- Kingdom: Plantae
- Clade: Tracheophytes
- Clade: Angiosperms
- Clade: Eudicots
- Clade: Asterids
- Order: Gentianales
- Family: Rubiaceae
- Subfamily: Ixoroideae
- Tribe: Gardenieae
- Genus: Alleizettella; Pit.

Type species
- Alleizettella rubra Pit.

Genus of plants

Alleizettella is a genus of flowering plants in the family Rubiaceae. It is restricted to southeastern China and northern Vietnam. The genus commemorates French botanist Aymar Charles d'Alleizette.

== Species ==
- Alleizettella leucocarpa (Champ. ex Benth.) Tirveng. - China and Vietnam
- Alleizettella rubra Pit. - Vietnam
