= Aivar =

Estonian male given name

- Gender: Male
- Language: Estonian
- Name day: 12 December

Origin
- Region of origin: Estonia

Other names
- Related names: Aivari, Aivars, Aivo

Aivar is an Estonian masculine given name. It is an Estonian equivalent of the Old Scandinavian name Ivar, from yr "yew" and -arr "warrior" . An alternative form is the related Estonian name Aivo.

People named Aivar include:

- Aivar Anniste (born 1980), football player
- Aivar Kala (born 1957), politician
- Aivar Kokk (born 1960), politician
- Aivar Kriiska (born 1965), archeologist
- Aivar Kuusmaa (born 1967), basketball player and coach
- Aivar Lillevere (born 1963), football coach
- Aivar Mäe (born 1960), choir conductor and theatre director
- Aivar Ojastu (born 1961), track and field athlete
- Aivar Õun (born 1959), politician
- Aivar Pilv (born 1961), lawyer
- Aivar Pohlak (born 1963), football manager
- Aivar Põldvee (born 1962), historian (:et)
- Aivar Priidel (born 1977), football player
- Aivar Rehe (1963–2019), banker and civil servant
- Aivar Rehemaa (born 1982), cross-country skier
- Aivar Riisalu (born 1961), singer, politician and businessman
- Aivar Simson (Seaküla Simson; born 1959), sculptor
- Aivar Sõerd (born 1964), politician
- Aivar Surva (born 1962), politician

== See also ==
- Aivar (film), a 2011 Indian film
