= Aivar Surva =

Estonian politician (born 1962)

Aivar Surva (born 27 March 1962) is an Estonian politician. He was a member of the XIII Riigikogu.

Surva was born in Kohtla-Järve. His brother is conductor Hirvo Surva. He is a 1986 graduate of Tallinn University of Technology, with a degree in automated control systems. He served as the mayor of Rapla from 2002 until 2005, Mayor of Mäetaguse from 2005 until 2013, and Mayor of Jõhvi Parish from 2014 until 2016.
