= Aymar =

Aymar is both a surname and a given name. Notable people with the name include:

== As a surname ==
- Louis-Esprit d'Aymar, French Navy officer who served during the War of American Independence
- Luciana Aymar (born 1977), Argentine field hockey midfielder
- Marcel Aymar, Canadian musician, composer, writer and actor
- Robert Aymar, Director General of CERN (2004–2008)
- Tim Aymar, American heavy metal singer/songwriter

== As a given name ==
- Aymar I of Angoulême (died 926), Count of Poitiers and Count of Angoulême
- Aymar the Monk (died 1202), Archbishop of Caesarea and Latin Patriarch of Jerusalem
- Aymer, Count of Angoulême (c. 1160–1202), also spelled Aymar
- Aymar of Lairon (died 1219), Lord of Caesarea and Marshal of the Knights Hospitaller
- Aymar Charles d'Alleizette (1884–1967), French military administrator and botanist
- Aymar de la Baume Pluvinel (1860–1938), French astronomer
- Aymar de Chaste (died 1603), French admiral
- Aymar Embury II (1880–1966), American architect
- Aymar Hennequin (1543–1596), French bishop and archbishop
- Aymar Joseph de Roquefeuil et du Bousquet (1714–1782), comte de Roquefeuil, French Navy officer

== See also ==
- Aymara language
- Aymer, a similarly spelled name
- Aymard
