= Graham Baldwin =

British anti-cult activist

- Born: 1954 (age 71–72)
- Known for: British anti-cult activist

Graham Baldwin (born c. 1954) is a British anti-cult activist who formed and directs the South London organization Catalyst Counseling, commonly called Catalyst, which received charity status in Britain in 1995. Catalyst primarily provides "exit counseling" to ex-cultists, but occasionally Baldwin would be consulted for news organizations, court cases, etc. Baldwin was a university chaplain. Baldwin has been called an "exit counsellor" by some newspapers like The Times and The Telegraph.

== Catalyst and anti-cult activity ==
Baldwin has been the director of Catalyst since its formation in late 1993. Catalyst offers exit counseling services to former members of new religious movements. Baldwin and Catalyst do not support deprogramming on its surface, but the charity has been accused of doing it anyway.

In 1997, Baldwin traveled to Portugal to help retrieve some children from a new religious movement for a British woman.

In July 2000, Baldwin was involved in an incident with the Jesus Christians and their supposed kidnapping of Bobby Kelly, a British 16-year-old who met some Jesus Christians at a shopping mall. His grandmother, in an article in the Daily Express, attested that the Jesus Christians told him to give up everything including family. On 27 July 2000, Bobby Kelly was identified as an inhabitant of a tent in a forest on the Surrey-Hampshire border near Mytchett. The two people who originally made contact with Kelly, Susan (Sue) and Roland Gianstefani, were sentenced to six-month suspended sentences for their part in the "kidnapping." In a note that he passed to the judge who handed down the sentence, Kelly wrote that they were protecting him against Baldwin, who they perceived was dangerous. The leader of the Jesus Christians, David McKay, and other Jesus Christians believed that Catalyst and Baldwin were trying to deprogram Kelly. Media producer Jon Ronson attempted to cover the story in an article in The Guardian in January 2006; however, it was never published because of Baldwin's presence in the article and his previous libel actions against the newspaper.

== Libel actions against The Guardian ==
In 1986, Mark Scott obtained custody of three children from his ex-wife, Claire Scott. Mark and Claire were members of the International Saturday Group (ISG), based in Areia, Portugal, led by Mark's mother Nadine Scott. Claire Scott left the group and moved to Britain in 1987 after her and Mark's divorce. Mark died of an AIDS-related illness in 1997, and a Portuguese court awarded her custody of their children on the condition that Claire Scott does not leave Portugal. She flew to Portugal for her ex-husband's funeral and learned from Nadine Scott that another member of ISG would foster the children. Wishing to bring her children to Britain, Claire Scott made contact with Baldwin through Catalyst and asked for assistance in bringing the then pre-teen children to Britain. Baldwin agreed, since Catalyst believed that the group was a "cult" that used poverty and physical force to control its members, and flew to Portugal. The details of what happened after Baldwin's arrival are unclear. His arrival to ISG's location was allegedly unannounced. The three children—a sixteen-year-old girl and two 13-year-old twin boys—expressed to both Claire Scott and Baldwin that they wished to stay in Portugal with ISG, but were forced to leave to Britain, where they arrived on 16 January 1997.

On 23 January 1997, The Guardian published an article called "Into a Shadowy World" in which the authors portrayed Baldwin as a "self-promoting, obsessive and dangerous crusader" against new religious movements. Baldwin brought the newspaper and the authors to the High Court in London charging them with defamation. Baldwin believed that his characterization was libelous in addition to the article's assertion that he broke a pledge made with Portuguese court, used false religious credentials, and was involved in the children's deprogramming. On 20 November 1998, a jury decided that the article defamed Baldwin. Baldwin was awarded £15,000 plus costs in damages for the article's libelous assertions.

The Guardian's editor Alan Rusbridger believed that the newspaper article was a "responsible and careful piece of journalism" and that losing the case was a "sad reflection on the libel laws." Rusbridger reported that The Guardian would appeal the decision; however, Baldwin believed that the editor's comments "undermine[d] the vindication he had won from the jury" in the original case, according to journalist Duncan Lamont. Baldwin brought The Guardian back to court for a second libel action. The Guardian argued that it and Rusbridger were protected under qualified privilege since it was for the public interest. However, in July 2001 Judge David Eady determined that they could not use that defense. Rusbridger and The Guardian paid Baldwin more damages in a settlement made on 31 January 2002.

== See also ==
- Anti-cult movement
- Exit counseling
