= Aiga (name) =

- Gender: Female
- Name day: August 29

Origin
- Region of origin: Latvia

Other names
- Related names: Aigis, Aigija, Aigins, Aigisa, Aigita, Aigars

Aiga is a Latvian language feminine given name, the most popular such name descended from Livonian language origins. Several names have descended from Aiga, among them being Aigis, Aigija, Aigins, Aigisa, and Aigita. The first recorded use of this name was in 1940 in Riga. The use of the name peaked in the 1970s and has declined since then.

Among the notable people who share this name are:

- Aiga Grabuste (b. 1988), Latvian athlete
- Aiga Rasch (1941–2009), German illustrator, graphic artist and painter
- Aiga Zagorska (b. 1970), retired Latvian athlete

== General references ==
Balodis, Pauls (August 2009). "Personal Names of Livonian Origin in Latvia: Past and Present" (PDF). In Wolfgang Ahrens; Sheila Embleton; André Lapierre (eds.). Proceedings of the 23rd International Congress of Onomastic Sciences. 23rd International Congress of Onomastic Sciences. Toronto, Canada: York University. pp. 105–116. ISBN 978-1-55014-521-2.
