= Orianne Aymard =

French mountaineer

Dr. Orianne Aymard
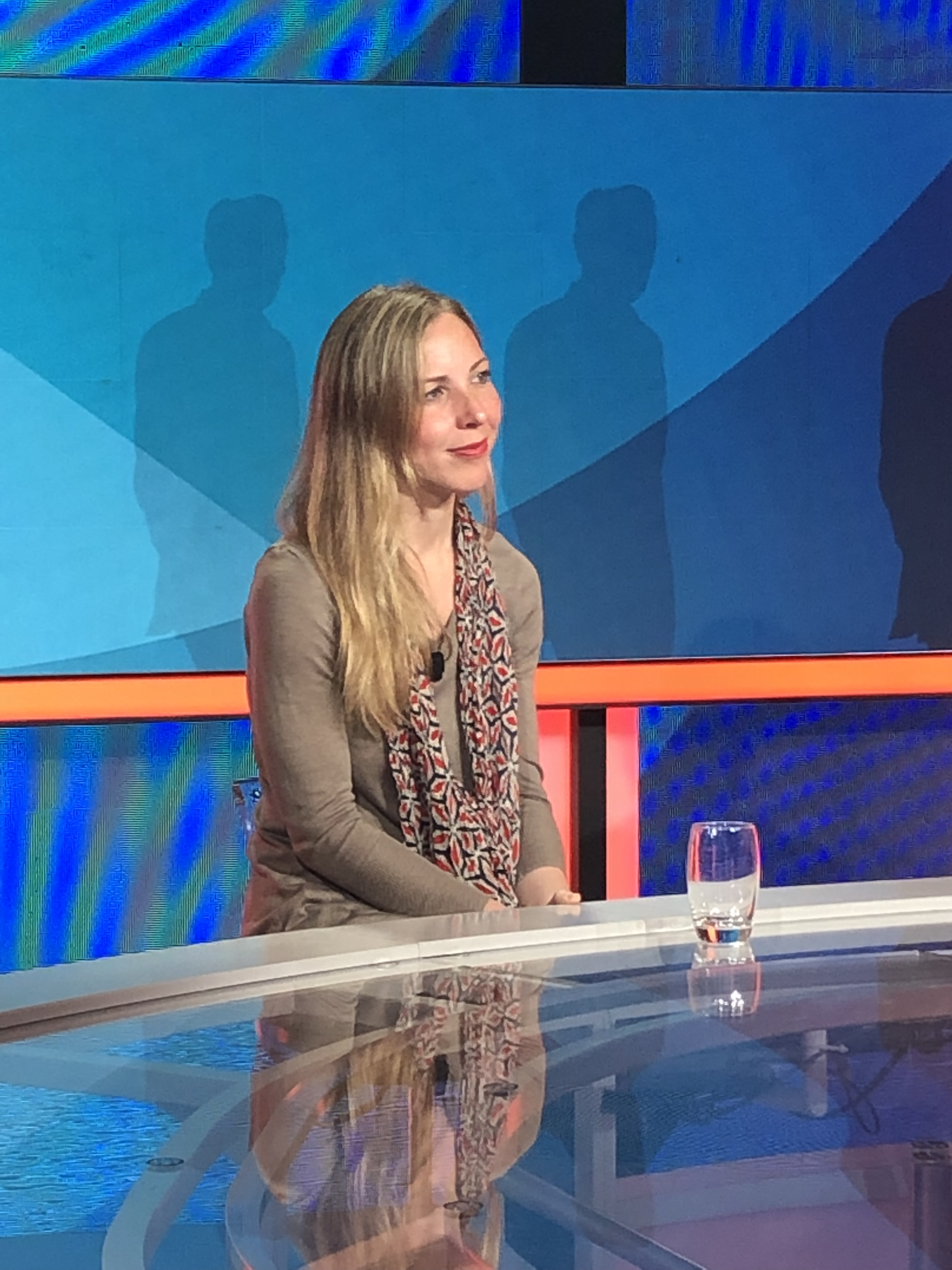
- Orianne on the TV set of Philippe Labro's show

Personal information
- Nationality: French
- Born: December 24, 1978 (age 47) Clamart, France
- Occupations: Author, speaker and mountaineer

Orianne Aymard (born December 24, 1978) is an author, speaker, and mountaineer from Clamart, France. She lives in Chamonix.

== Early life and education ==
Orianne Aymard was born on December 24, 1978, in Clamart, France, and spent her childhood and adolescence in Sceaux, Hauts-de-Seine, near Paris. After studying biology and environmental science at the University of Paris-Saclay, and then at the University of Western Brittany, she earned a Master of Science in social policy from the London School of Economics in 2002. She continued there with a Ph.D. focusing on social policy in Tibet.

At 25 years old, following a cerebral hemorrhage in 2004 in northern India, near the samādhi (tomb) of Anandamayi Ma in Kankhal, at the foot of the Himalayas, she changed the direction of her studies. In 2008, she obtained a PhD in religious studies from the Université du Québec à Montréal, jointly with Concordia University and Université Laval, with a thesis on Hinduism on the postmortem worship of saints in Hindu tradition. In 2014, she published a book based on her doctoral research, When a Goddess Dies with Oxford University Press in New York, which focuses on the worship of Mā Ānandamayī after her death (mahāsamādhi).

== Teaching and research ==
During her studies in marine biology, she joined various scientific research programs, notably at the Ocean Park Conservation Foundation Hong Kong, the Texas A&M University Marine Mammal Research Program, Opération Cétacés in New Caledonia, the Instituto del Mar del Peru in Callao, the Commonwealth Scientific and Industrial Research Organisation (CSIRO) in Hobart, the National University of Costa Rica, and UNESCO in Jakarta.

From 2005 to 2007, she taught in the Department of Religious Studies at the University of Quebec in Montreal (UQAM) and was a research associate at the Institute for Feminist Research Studies (IREF). In 2012-2013, she was a visiting scholar at Columbia University's School of International and Public Affairs, Columbia University in New York, and a research associate at Harvard University's Harvard Humanitarian Initiative. From 2019 to 2021, she was a member of the Centre d'études et de recherches sur l'Inde, l'Asie du Sud et sa diaspora (CERIAS, Center for South Asian Studies and Diaspora Research), and collaborated with the World Religions and Spirituality Project. Concurrently, she was an executive fellow at the Geneva Centre for Security Policy.

== Humanitarian and diplomatic career ==
From 2008 to 2011, she joined the International Committee of the Red Cross in Geneva. After a mission in Burundi, in Gitega, where she promoted international humanitarian law to the military and visited detention sites, she was sent to Haiti just after the 2010 earthquake. There, she was responsible for the restoration of family links, and later in charge of areas controlled by gangs in Port-au-Prince, such as Cité Soleil, Martissant, and Bel Air, during the cholera epidemic and electoral violence. She would not return to Haiti until many years later, as an electoral observer with the Organization of American States.

From 2014 to 2018, after two years in the United States, she joined the French Ministry of Europe and Foreign Affairs, where she was primarily responsible for religious issues and violent extremism during the November 2015 Paris terrorist attacks.

== Adventure and the Himalayas ==
From a young age, Aymard developed an interest in high-altitude mountaineering in the Himalayas. In 2004, she experienced a cerebral hemorrhage, which interrupted this trajectory for several years. She later returned to the Himalayas and, in 2019, climbed Lhotse (8,516 m). She subsequently published a book about this ascent, Sous l'œil de la Déesse (Under the Eye of the Goddess) with Mont-Blanc Editions (2022), under the direction of Catherine Destivelle. The book notably addresses the challenges faced by women in male-dominated mountaineering environment.

In 2023, she attempted to climb Mount Everest. During the expedition, she was injured in a serac fall in the Khumbu Icefall and was evacuated. She later returned to complete the ascent, reaching the summit of Everest (8,848 m) on May 17, 2023. She sustained frostbite and a fracture during the descent.

She published a book about the expedition, Au cœur de l’Everest: la quête d’une femme au sommet (To the Heart of Everest : A Woman’s Journey to the Summit), published by Mareuil Editions. The book recounts her experience and examines perceptions and representations of climbing Everest.

== Summit Climbs ==
Selected ascents include:

- Himlung, Nepal, 7,126 m – October 28, 2018
- Lobuche, Nepal, 6,119 m – April 20, 2019
- Lhotse, Nepal, 8,516 m – May 23, 2019
- Aconcagua, Argentina, 6,961 m – January 26, 2022
- Island Peak, Nepal, 6,165 m – April 17, 2023
- Everest, Nepal, 8,848 m – May 17, 2023

== Main Publications ==
- To the Heart of Everest: A Woman’s Journey to the Summit, independently published, 2026
- L'appel de l'Everest: le Lhotse, ou l'autre sommet (Everest Calling), Paris, Mareuil Editions, 2026
- Au cœur de l'Everest: la quête d'une femme au sommet, Paris, Mareuil Editions, 2024
- Sous l'œil de la Déesse, Chamonix, Mont-Blanc Editions, 2022
- Avec mon bâton, Paris, Un Dimanche Après-Midi Editions, 2022
- When a Goddess Dies: Worshipping Mā Ānandamayī after Her Death, New York, Oxford University Press, 2014

== Films ==
She is featured in the documentary film "Everest, the Mother Goddess" (52 minutes) directed by David Vital-Durand and released in 2024. The film covers her ascent of Mount Everest and was produced by TV8 Mont-Blanc and Injam Production.

She has also appeared in other documentaries, including "Everest en partage", based on an original idea by the "Everest Sprinter", Marc Batard, in which she discusses her accident in the Khumbu Icefall.
