= Alleizettella leucocarpa =

Scientific classification
- Kingdom: Plantae
- Clade: Tracheophytes
- Clade: Angiosperms
- Clade: Eudicots
- Clade: Asterids
- Order: Gentianales
- Family: Rubiaceae
- Genus: Alleizettella
- Species: A. leucocarpa

Binomial name
- Alleizettella leucocarpa (Champ. ex Benth.) Tirveng.

Species of plant

Alleizettella leucocarpa is a species of flowering plant, a member of the family Rubiaceae.
