= Ivars =

Male given name and surname

Ivars is a Latvian masculine given name, derived from Scandinavian Ivar. It also occurs as a surname in some cases.

== Given name ==
- Ivars Godmanis (born 1951), Latvian politician
- Ivars Hiršs (1931–1989), Latvian-born American painter
- Ivars Kalniņš (born 1948), Latvian actor
- Ivars Knēts (1938–2019), Latvian materials scientist
- Ivars Peterson (born 1948), Canadian mathematics writer
- Ivars Timermanis (born 1982), Latvian basketball player
- Ivars Kalviņš (born 1947), Latvian chemist and inventor
- Ivars Ijabs (born 1982), Latvian political scientist and Member of the European Parliament
- Ivars Punnenovs (born 1994), Latvian professional ice hockey player

== Surname ==
- Ann-Marie Ivars, Swedish Finnish linguist
- Peter Ivars, Finnish orienteer

== See also ==
- Aivars
