= National Union "Justice" =

Latvian political party

National Union "Justice" Nacionālā Savienība "Taisnīgums"
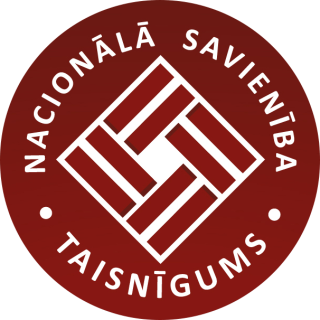
- Abbreviation: NST
- Leader: Viktors Birze
- Founders: Aigars Prūsis; Viktors Birze
- Founded: 26 June 2003
- Preceded by: Helsinki-86 (1998)
- Headquarters: Lāčplēša iela 43/45-19a Riga, Latvia
- Ideology: Ultranationalism; Anti-Zionism; Antisemitism; Ethnic nationalism Anti-capitalism
- Political position: Far-right
- National affiliation: Union for Latvia (2022)
- Colours: Maroon

Party flag

Website
- www.taisnigums.lv

National Union "Justice" (Latvian: Nacionālā Savienība "Taisnīgums", NST), until 2014 known as National Power Union (Latvian: Nacionālā Spēka Savienība, NSS), sometimes referred to as Union of National Force, is a far-right ultranationalist political party in Latvia.

== History ==
It was founded in 2003 by Aigars Prūsis and Viktors Birze on the base of the human rights group Helsinki-86. Current leaders of NST are Viktors Birze, Vilnis Strods, Valters Grīviņš and Normunds Krafts.

In the 2005 municipal elections to the Liepāja city council, the NST received 400 votes, or 1.86% of the total, and no seats. In the 2006 parliamentary election, the NSS received 1172 votes, or 0.13% of the total, and no seats. NST

NST is known for a number of controversial activities. In 2005, it commemorated the 105th birthday of the controversial Latvian aviator and alleged World War II Nazi war criminal Herberts Cukurs, NST claims that they celebrated the aviation achievements of Cukurs and that there is no sufficient evidence to conclude that Cukurs was involved in war crimes.

NSS participated in the protests against the gay pride parade in Riga on July 22, 2006. Prior to the parade, the chairman of NST, Viktors Birze threatened that the anti-gay pride protests will not be limited to non-violent methods. As of May 2007, Birze and at least one other NST member are under investigation for attacks against the parade by throwing objects at the participants of the parade and police officers. After the events, NST admitted their presence in the anti-pride protests but denied that their members were the ones throwing objects at the pride participants.

On May 9, 2007, NST commemorated the anniversary of the end of World War II by marching towards the Monument to the Liberators of Soviet Latvia and Riga from the German Fascist Invaders and attempting to place a wreath made of barbed wire at the monument, to emphasize the ordeals of Latvia after the Soviet re-occupation of Latvia, but were prevented from placing the barbed wire wreath by the police.

== Election results ==
=== Saeima ===
Election	Leader	Votes	%	Seats	+/–	Government
2006	1,172	0.13 (#17)	0 / 100	▲		

== See also ==
- List of political parties in Latvia
