= Arthur David-Andersen =

Norwegian goldsmith

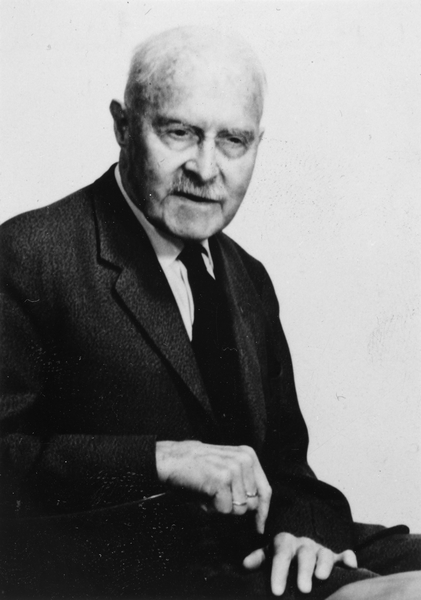
- Born: 1 April 1875; London
- Died: 25 December 1970 (aged 95)
- Occupation: Goldsmith
- Children: Ivar David-Andersen
- Parent: David Andersen

Arthur David-Andersen (21 April 1875 – 25 December 1970) was a Norwegian goldsmith.

He was born in London to David Andersen, a goldsmith, and Sophia Gott. He was the father of goldsmith Ivar David-Andersen who also became a goldsmith. He graduated from Norwegian National Academy of Craft and Art Industry in 1893, and worked as designer for some years. When his father died in 1901, he took over the family company, along with his brother. David-Andersen was a co-founder of the trade union Norges Gullsmedforbund (Goldsmith Union of Norway), and chaired the organization from 1909 to 1921. He was also a long-term prominent member of Oslo Håndverks- og Industriforening (Carpentry and industry association of Oslo), a member of the board of representatives from 1906 to 1945. He was decorated Knight, First Class of the Order of St. Olav in 1954.
