= David Andersen (goldsmith) =

Norwegian goldsmith

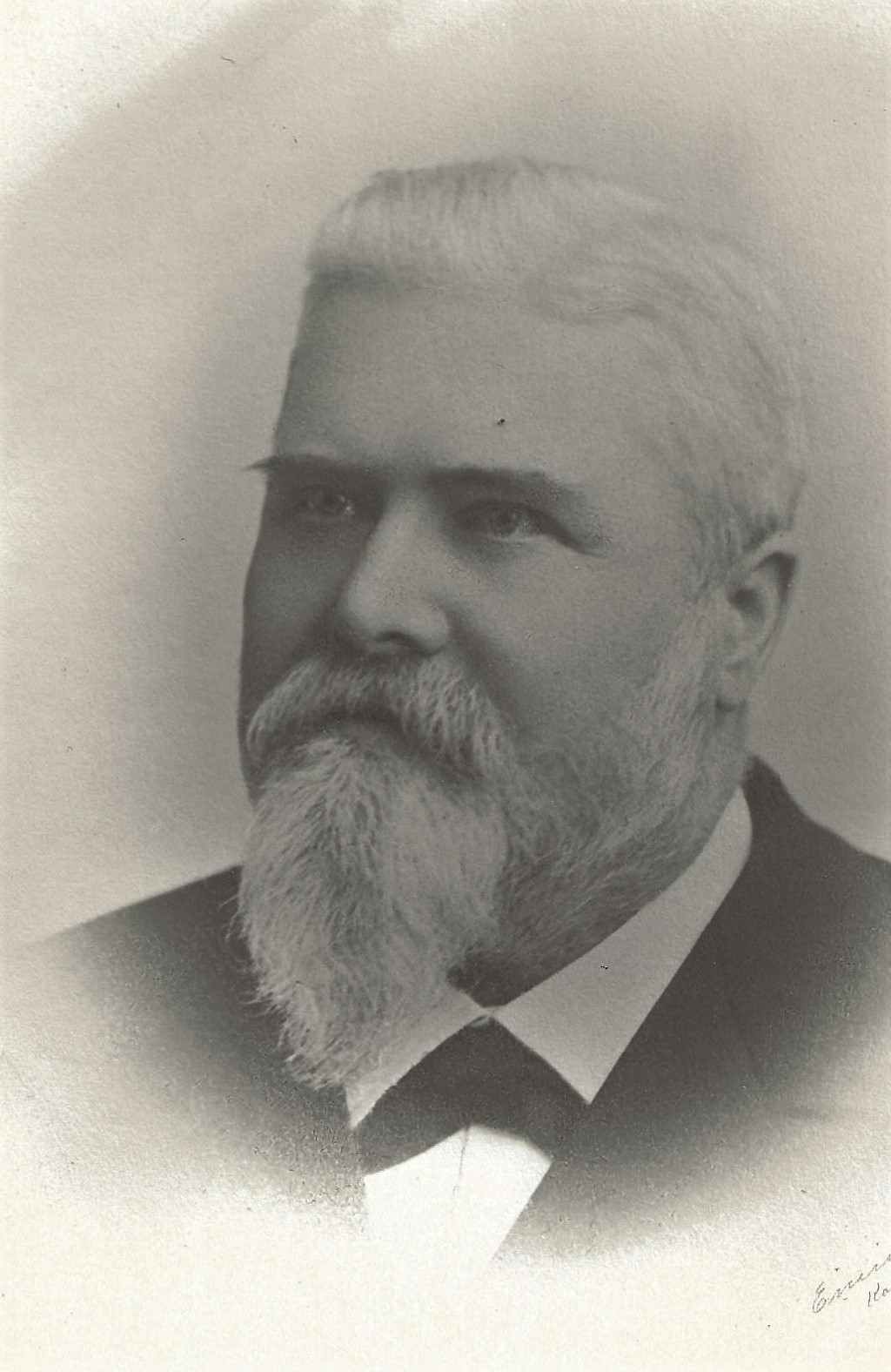
- Born: 25 May 1843; Østre Toten Municipality, Norway
- Died: 3 August 1901 (aged 58)
- Occupation: Goldsmith
- Children: Arthur David-Andersen
- Relatives: Ivar David-Andersen (grandson)

David Andersen (25 May 1843 – 3 August 1901) was a Norwegian goldsmith.

He was born in Østre Toten Municipality (now part of Innlandet county) to Anders Svendsen and Anne Margrethe Gulbrandsdatter, and was the father of goldsmith Arthur David-Andersen. From 1859 he was in apprenticeship with the jeweller Jacob Tostrup in Christiania (now called Oslo). He spent several periods abroad, in Berlin, Stockholm, Paris and London. During his stay in London he also imported Norwegian filigree works to the United Kingdom. He established his own goldsmith workshop in Christiania 1876, which eventually became a leading company in the goldsmith industry in Norway. A significant part of his filigree works was exported to Great Britain. As of 1899 his company employed 92 men and 29 women.

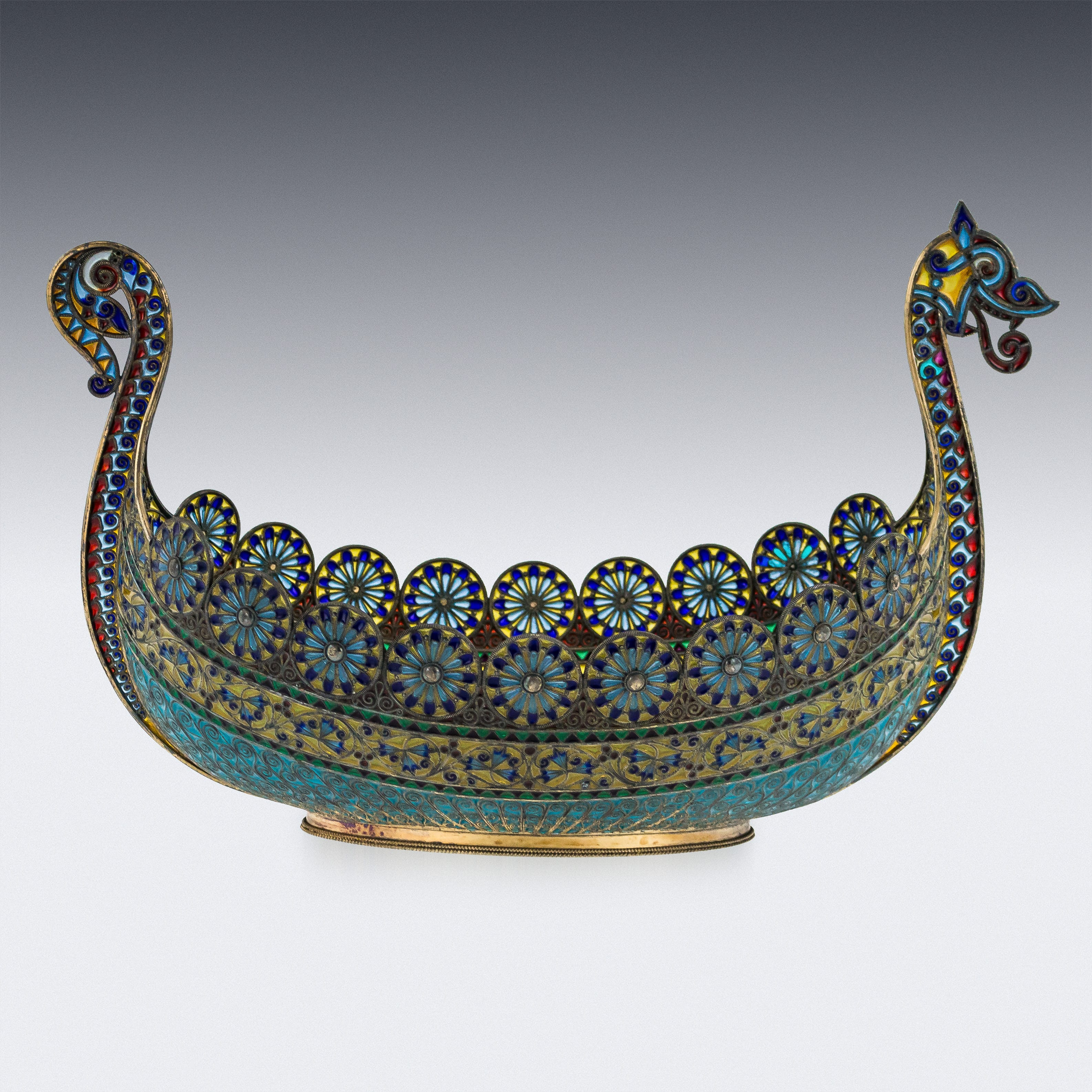
A silver & plique-a-jour enamel viking boat by David Andersen

In 1900 at the Exposition Universelle in Paris his company won two gold medals.
