= Aivo =

Estonian male given name

- Gender: Male
- Language: Estonian

Origin
- Region of origin: Estonia

Other names
- Related names: Aivar

Aivo is an Estonian masculine given name. It is an Estonian equivalent of the Old Scandinavian name Ivar, from yr "yew" and -arr "warrior" . An alternative form is the related Estonian name Aivar.

People named Aivo include:

- Aivo Udras (born 1970), biathlete
- Aivo Orav (born 1965), diplomat
- Aivo Välja (born 1968), dirigent
