= Ivar David-Andersen =

Norwegian goldsmith

- Born: 11 August 1903; Vestre Aker, Norway
- Died: 30 April 1998 (aged 94)
- Occupation: Goldsmith
- Parent: Arthur David-Andersen
- Relatives: David Andersen (grandfather)

Ivar David-Andersen (11 August 1903 – 30 April 1998) was a Norwegian goldsmith.

He was born in Vestre Aker to goldsmith Arthur David-Andersen, a goldsmith, and Helene Sofie Hirschholm Bentzen. After finishing examen artium (a kind of secondary education exam) in 1921 and a course at the Norwegian Military Academy in 1922, he started in apprenticeship with the family company. He was also educated at the Norwegian National Academy of Craft and Art Industry under designer and goldsmith Jacob Prytz, and made further studies with sculptor Ossip Zadkine in Paris. He is represented at the Norwegian Museum of Decorative Arts and Design with one of his designs. From 1952 he took over as leader of the family company David-Andersen. He was decorated Knight, First Class of the Order of St. Olav in 1973.

His paternal grandfather David Andersen was also a goldsmith.
