= Aivar Pilv =

Estonian lawyer

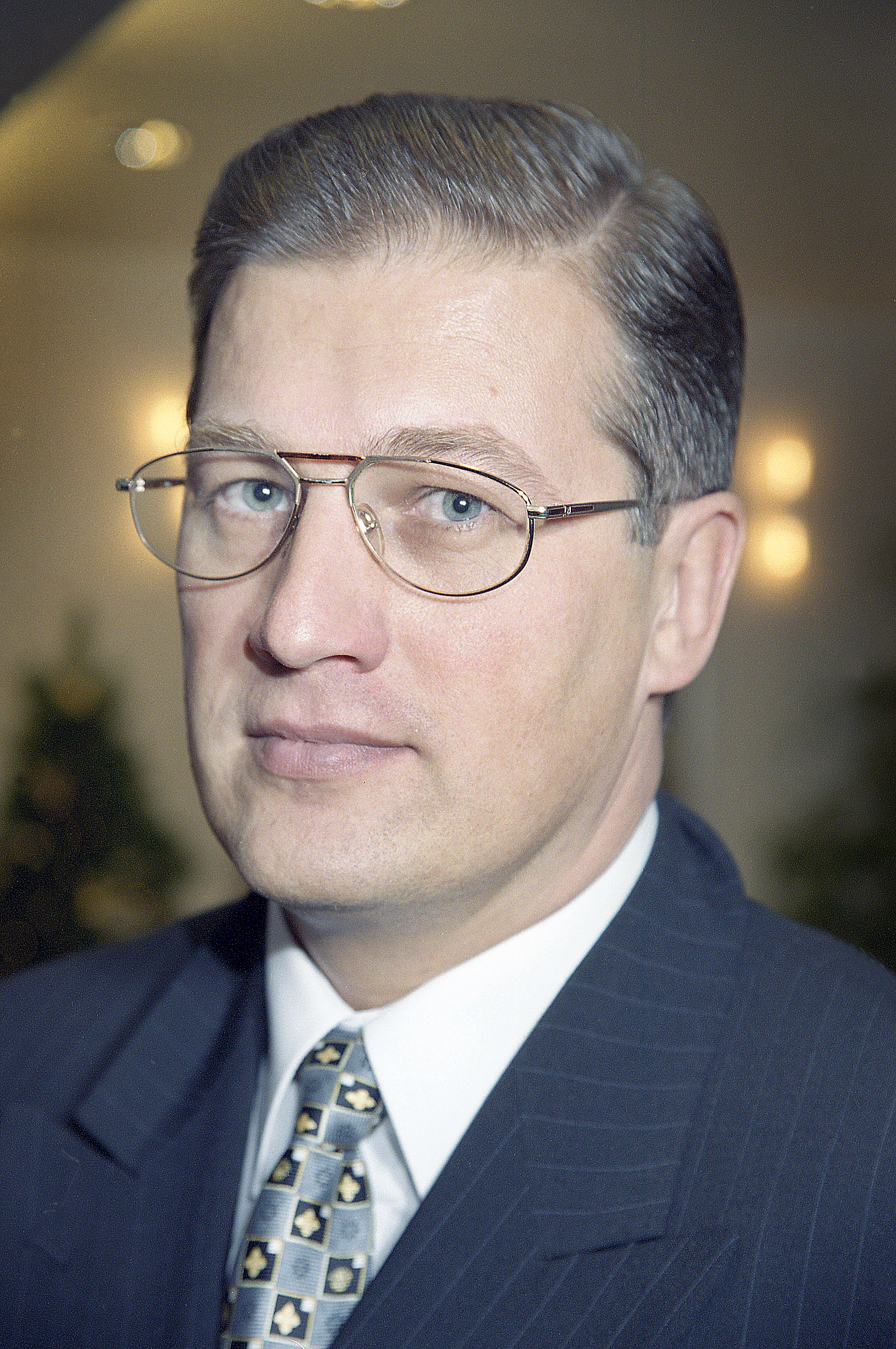
Aivar Pilv in 1999

Aivar Pilv (born 22 March 1961) is an Estonian lawyer.

In 1984, he graduated from Tartu State University with a degree in law.

Since 1984, he is a member of Estonian Bar Association (Estonian: Eesti Advokatuur). 2004–2010, he was the head of the association. In 1993, he established his own law firm, AS Advokaadibüroo Aivar Pilv.

He has been a major figure in big court cases, e.g. related to Andrus Veerpalu (Andrus Veerpalu v International Ski Federation) and Villu Reiljan.
