= Ivar Høsteng Neerland =

Norwegian politician

Ivar Hoesteng Neerland
- Born: 4 March 1907
- Died: 19 July 1978 (aged 71)
- Occupation: Norwegian politician

Ivar Høsteng Neerland (4 March 1907 – 19 July 1978) was a Norwegian politician for the Conservative Party.

He served as a deputy representative to the Parliament of Norway from Møre og Romsdal during the term 1958–1961. In total he met during 19 days of parliamentary session.
