= Ivars Hirss =

Latvian-American painter

Ivars Hiršs
- Ivars Hiršs photograph by Alberts Vasils, from the 1974 edition of Jaunā Gaita
- Born: July 11, 1931; Riga, Latvia
- Died: March 10, 1989 (aged 57); San Francisco
- Known for: Painter
- Movement: Graphics

Ivars Hiršs (1931–1989) was a Latvian-born American painter.

== Life and work ==
Hiršs was born in Riga, into an extremely wealthy Latvian family of Roberts Hiršs, a textile mill owner. Contrary to his father's wishes that he become a businessman, Hiršs pursued a career in art. The family left Latvia in the late 1930s and moved to Sweden, before emigrating to the United States. There Hiršs graduated with a Masters from the Rhode Island School of Design in 1954.

He continued his studies at the California College of the Arts and Crafts, later moving to San Francisco, where, by the early 1960s he had made a name for himself in graphics, as well as within the greater San Francisco art community. He had several successful exhibits, including one at the Triangle Gallery (San Francisco) in 1962 and another in 1967 at the San Francisco Museum of Modern Art. His work often included a bright primary color upon which other colors were then superimposed. It also often included Latvian decorations or ornaments.

Hiršs died in 1989 from complications related to alcoholism. With the revival of modernist aesthetics, Hiršs' art has received renewed interest from scholars.

== Exhibitions ==
- 1962 Thesis (M.F.A.)--California College of Arts and Crafts "The serigraphs of Ivars Hirss", San Francisco, CA
- 1967 January 17-February 12, "Serigraphs by Rolf Eiselin and Ivars Hirss: San Francisco Museum of Art. CA
- 1971 January 15-February 28, "San Francisco Art Institute centennial exhibition", San Francisco CA

== Selected major collections ==
- The Janet Turner Print Museum at California State University, Chico. CA

(in others as well as many private collections)

== List of works ==
- Untitled, 1962, Serigraph / color Collection of The Janet Turner Print Museum at California State University, Chico CA.
- My Window Facing East, Serigraph/color, Collection of The Janet Turner Print Museum at California State University, Chico CA.
