= Aymar Charles d'Alleizette =

- Born: 23 January 1884; Paris, France
- Died: 4 July 1967 (aged 83); Clermont-Ferrand, France
- Occupations: military administrator; scientist; curator
- Notable work: articles on the botany of Auvergne
- Awards: Prix de Coincy (1955)
- Scientific career
- Fields: botany
- Institutions: Muséum d'Histoire Naturelle; University of Clermont-Ferrand

Aymar Charles d'Alleizette (23 January 1884, in Paris – 4 July 1967, in Clermont-Ferrand) was a French military administrator and botanist.

He was a member of the French military from around 1904 to 1942, during which time, he was stationed in Madagascar (1906), Tonkin (1908) and Algeria (1911–22). From 1943 to 1948 he worked in the laboratory of phanerogams at the Muséum d'Histoire Naturelle in Paris, and afterwards, served as curator of the herbarium at Clermont-Ferrand.

Throughout his career, he collected botanical specimens, and his personal herbarium of 55,000 items is now property of the Faculty of Sciences at Clermont-Ferrand. He held a particular interest in Orchidaceae native to Europe and northern Africa, and he is credited with providing descriptions of many orchid hybrids. The botanical genera Alleizettea and Alleizettella commemorate his name.

== Selected works ==
He was the author of numerous articles on the botany of Auvergne, published in the Bulletin de la Société d'histoire naturelle d'Auvergne, these include:

- Note sur les Orchidées d'Auvergne. Bull. Soc. Hist. nat. d’Auvergne, 4(1), 1938.
- Observations sur la flore d'Auvergne. Bull. Soc. Hist. nat. d’Auvergne, 19(1-2) (with J.E. Loiseau), 1953.
- Hybrides de Viola Tricolor en Auvergne. Bull. Soc. Hist. nat. d’Auvergne, 19(1-2), 1953.
- Contribution à l'étude de la flore d'Auvergne. Bull. Soc. Hist. nat. d’Auvergne, 1965.
