= Ivar W. Brogger =

Norwegian-American electrical engineer and inventor

Ivar Waldemar Brogger, Jr. (December 18, 1880 – April 20, 1963) was a Norwegian-born, American electrical engineer and inventor. Brogger is credited with a number of patented inventions including invention of auto direction signal lights in 1933, as well as a low level of oil indicator in automobiles in 1928.

== Biography ==
Ivar Waldemar Brogger was born in Ålesund in Møre og Romsdal, Norway. He was the son of Ivar Waldemar Brøgger (1849–1909), who served as mayor in Ålesund (1892–1895, 1899–1901). Brogger received his electrical engineering degree in Hanover, Germany. He immigrated to the United States in 1906. For many years, he was employed by Weston Electrical Instruments Works and Edison-Splitdorf Radio Corp., both located in Newark, New Jersey. He was later employed by Connecticut Telephone & Electric Company of Meriden, CT.
