= Ivar Nordlund =

Finnish politician

Karl Ivar Nordlund (2 February 1855 - 6 September 1937) was a Finnish Lutheran clergyman and politician, born in Närpes. He was a member of the Diet of Finland from 1905 to 1906 and of the Parliament of Finland from 1909 to 1912, representing the Swedish People's Party of Finland (SFP).
