= Aigars =

- Gender: Male

Origin
- Region of origin: Latvia

Aigars is a Latvian masculine given name and may refer to:

- Aigars Apinis (born 1973), Latvian decathlete and Paralympic medalist
- Aigars Cipruss (born 1972), Latvian ice hockey player
- Aigars Fadejevs (1975–2024), Latvian track and field athlete and Olympic medalist
- Aigars Jansons (born 1971), Latvian wrestler
- Aigars Kalvītis (born 1966), Latvian politician, former Prime Minister of Latvia
- Aigars Kriķis (1954–1999), Latvian luger and Olympic medalist
- Aigars Kudis (born 1959), Latvian former swimmer
- Aigars Nerips (born 1967), Latvian basketball coach
- Aigars Prūsis (born 1976), Latvian nationalist politician
- Aigars Šķēle (born 1992), Latvian basketball player
- Aigars Štokenbergs (born 1963), Latvian politician
- Aigars Vītols (born 1976), Latvian basketball player
