= Ivar (brand) =

Backpack brand

IVAR — The Backpack Reinvented
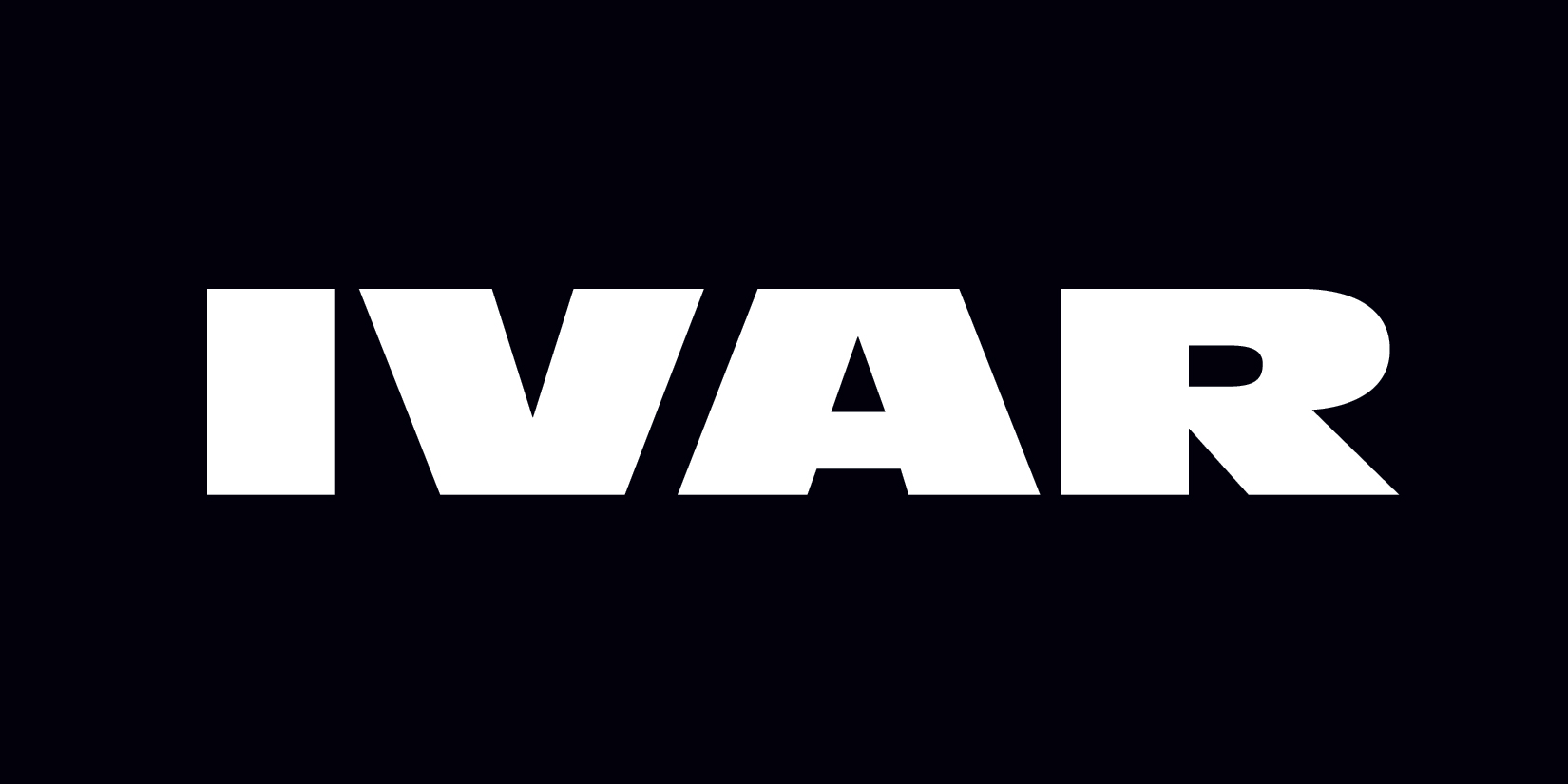
- Company type: Private: LLC
- Industry: Fashion, retail, wholesale, eCommerce
- Founded: 2006
- Founder: Ian C. Ivarson
- Headquarters: San Francisco, CA, United States
- Area served: Worldwide
- Products: Backpacks, bags
- Owner: Ivarson USA, LLC
- Website: ivarpack.com

IVAR is a brand of backpacks known for a patented ergonomic and organizational file-like design called the IVAR-LIFT Design. Ian Ivarson launched IVAR in July 2006 from Marin County, California.

== Company background ==
In 1998, Ian Ivarson conceived and designed an internal shelf system for backpacks, with an aim to create better organization and weight distribution ergonomics. At the time, he was a high school student at Marin Catholic in Kentfield, California. Early prototypes were developed with a sewer in Berkeley, California, and eventually progressed to direct relationships with unionized factories in Asia.

During early development, Ivarson also filed for patents. Until the actual launch of IVAR, development of the IVAR backpack was slow, as he was a college student and student-athlete during most of that time.

Following graduation from the University of Denver, Ivarson launched IVAR in July 2006 with one single daypack model from an office and warehouse on Bank Street in San Anselmo, California.

Over the years, IVAR's retail distribution reached a height of over 300 retail doors. Today, the brand is sold primarily online and in an array of brick-and-mortar retailers in the sporting goods, outdoor, luggage, and bookstore categories.
