= Ivar Tollefsen =

Norwegian billionaire businessman

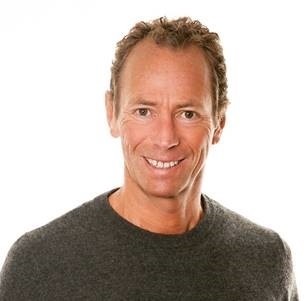
- Born: 23 June 1961 (age 64); Asker, Norway

Ivar Tollefsen (born 23 June 1961) is a Norwegian businessman, the founder of Tollefsen Enterprises and Fredensborg AS.

== Career ==
In 1985, Tollefsen Enterprises was bought by investment firm Vest Invest for around $2.8 million. In 1994, Tollefsen engaged in real-estate business and bought a 20-apartments building in central Oslo. Later he founded Fredensborg AS, which is one of the largest owners of rental housing, owning more than 27,000 apartments across Scandinavia. Since 2020, the company has actively invested in foreign property. Only in 2020, Heimstaden Bostad AB, controlled by Fredensborg AS, acquired 1732 buildings across Germany.

== Controversies ==
=== Bribery Allegations Involving Alecta ===
In April 2024, Swedish media outlet Dagens Industri reported that Ivar Tollefsen's real estate company, Heimstaden Bostad, was under investigation by Sweden's National Anti-Corruption Unit. The investigation centered on allegations that Tollefsen had offered luxury vacations to executives at Alecta, a major Swedish pension fund, to influence their investment decisions. Specifically, the trips reportedly included stays in South Africa and France, linked to Alecta's $4.6 billion investment in Heimstaden Bostad.

Tollefsen and Heimstaden Bostad have denied these allegations.

=== Arbitration with Alecta Over Investment Terms ===
In December 2024, Alecta initiated arbitration proceedings against Heimstaden Bostad, alleging that Tollefsen's investments in a new subsidiary violated the shareholder agreement between the two parties.

=== Criticism of Business Practices ===
Tollefsen has faced criticism for business practices related to affordability and quality in properties owned by Heimstaden Bostad. Critics argue that some apartments have been converted into smaller units, leading to higher rents and contributing to housing shortages. Additionally, registering the company in Switzerland has been viewed by some as a tax avoidance strategy.

In 1991, he set the world speed record for the crossing of Greenland on skis. In 1993, he led some of the first expeditions to climb mountains in Antarctica. In 2009, he finished fourth in the Dakar Rally.

Ivar Tollefsen made the 2022 Forbes Billionaires List with an estimated wealth of $6.4 billion and occupied the 398th position.
