= Ivar Roslund =

Swedish footballer (1907–1988)

Personal information
- Full name: Ivar Roslund
- Date of birth: 4 July 1907
- Date of death: 1988
- Position: Midfielder

Senior career*
Years	Team	Apps	(Gls)
1925–1937	Malmö FF	169	(71)
- * Club domestic league appearances and goals

Ivar Roslund (4 July 1907 – 1988) was a Swedish footballer who played as a midfielder.
