= Alleizettella rubra =

Conservation status
- Vulnerable (IUCN 2.3)

Scientific classification
- Kingdom: Plantae
- Clade: Tracheophytes
- Clade: Angiosperms
- Clade: Eudicots
- Clade: Asterids
- Order: Gentianales
- Family: Rubiaceae
- Genus: Alleizettella
- Species: A. rubra

Binomial name
- Alleizettella rubra Pit.

Species of plant

Alleizettella rubra is a species of flowering plant in the family Rubiaceae. It is endemic to northern Vietnam.
