= Hirvo Surva =

Estonian choir conductor and politician

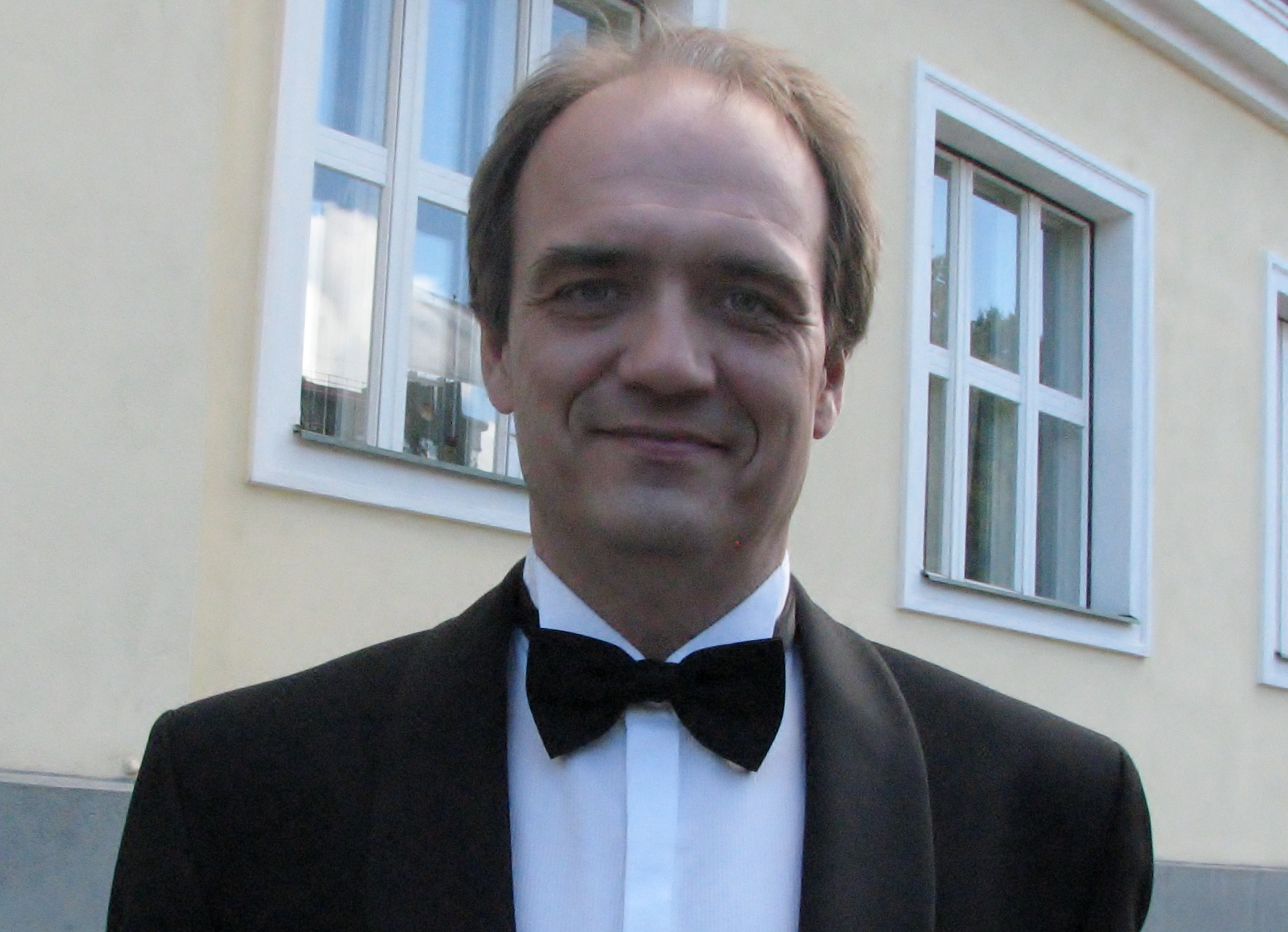
Hirvo Surva

Hirvo Surva (born 2 July 1963 in Kohtla-Järve) is an Estonian choir conductor and politician. He was a member of X Riigikogu.
