= Aymard Moro Mvé =

Gabonese footballer

Aymar Moro-Mvé
Personal information
- Full name: Aymard Fabrice Moro-Mvé
- Date of birth: 1 June 1987 (age 39)
- Place of birth: Libreville, Gabon
- Height: 1.75 m (5 ft 9 in)
- Position: Left back

Team information
- Current team: SC Feignies
- Number: 25

Youth career
- 1998–2000: SCO Roubaix
- 2000–2001: ES Wasquehal
- 2001–2005: OSC Lille

Senior career*
| Years | Team | Apps | (Gls) |
| 2005–2009 | OSC Lille B | 46 | (2) |
| 2009–2010 | K.V. Mechelen | 2 | (0) |
| 2010–2011 | SC Feignies | 11 | (2) |

International career^{‡}
| 2008–2009 | Gabon | 3 | (0) |
- * Club domestic league appearances and goals as of 25 January 2012 ‡ National team caps and goals as of 25 January 2012

Aymard Fabrice Moro-Mvé (born 1 June 1987 in Libreville) is a Gabonese footballer is currently playing for SC Feignies.

== Career ==
Moro-Mvé began his career 1998 with SCO Roubaix and was after two years in summer 2000 scouted from ES Wasquehal. After only one year with ES Wasquehal signed in July 2001 a youth contract with OSC Lille. In 2006 was promoted to the reserve from OSC Lille, played 45 games and scores 2 goals. On 30 May 2009 K.V. Mechelen have signed the left-back from OSC Lille until June 2011. and in September 2011 signed for SC Feignies.

=== International ===
Moro-Mvé first call for Gabon was on 23 February 2008 and played his first game in April 2008 against DR Congo national football team.
