= Aphelodoris rubra =

Scientific classification
- Kingdom: Animalia
- Phylum: Mollusca
- Class: Gastropoda
- Order: Nudibranchia
- Family: Dorididae
- Genus: Aphelodoris
- Species: A. rubra

Binomial name
- Aphelodoris rubra Bergh

Species of gastropod

Aphelodoris rubra is a species of sea slug, specifically a dorid nudibranch. It is a shell-less marine gastropod mollusc belonging to the family Dorididae.

== Taxonomy ==
Aphelodoris rubra was described by Rudolph Bergh and placed within the family Dorididae, a group of dorid nudibranchs characterised by a dorsoventrally flattened body and a mantle that typically covers the internal organs.
