= Aigars Prūsis =

Latvian politician

Aigars Prūsis (born January 5, 1976, in Liepāja) was the leader of Latvia's National Power Union, a far-right nationalist political party, in 2003–2006.

He ran Latvians.lv, an Internet portal for far-right Latvian nationalist groups.
