= Ivar Sandström =

Swedish aviation pioneer

Ivar Bernhard Sandström (September 18, 1889 — September 2, 1917) was a Swedish aviation pioneer and one of Sweden's earliest aviators. He became a cadet in 1905 and a lieutenant in 1911. In 1915 he was assigned to Dr Enoch Thulin's aviation school at Ljungbyhed to attend a pilot training course. After passing the examination, he obtained the Swedish aviation diploma n° 30 issued by the Swedish Aeronautical Society. He then was assigned to the Navy's aviation department at Landskrona. He was killed during a flight over Malmö when he fell out of his plane.

== Biography ==
=== Aviation pioneer ===
Born in Visby, Sweden, Sandström was the youngest son of seven children. His parents were sea captain Bernhard Sandström and Maria Wilhelmina Hallin. Ivar's elder sisters Hildur and Alice married and had children while his brothers William, Henry and Charles went to sea. A younger sister died of diphtheria at the age of 9. Sandström became a navy officer: cadet in 1905 and sublieutenant in 1911. He then started to take an interest in aviation, which was still in its infancy. In summer 1915, he joined Enoch Thulin's flying school in southern Sweden. He was one of the first aviators to obtain the international flying licence, after passing the examination on August 31. He was promoted to lieutenant in 1915 and then flew continuously. He was known to be one of the country's most skillful, calm and experienced aviators. However, according to contemporary newspapers, he had already had several accidents. Once, the engine stopped and his aeroplane crashed at Nyhamn, Östgötacorrespondenten wrote.

"The plane crash
On September 2, 1917, Lieutenant Sandström, who was assigned to the Navy's aviation corps department in Landskrona, prepared for a flight together with lieutenants Krokstedt and Beckman. His Morane-Saulnier plane was not quite ready for start so he started later than the other two, in a southwards direction towards the city of Malmö.

Witnesses saw the airplane suddenly turned over and the pilot fell out. He was found in a field near Malmö, still alive but badly hurt. He was brought to the hospital but died during the transport. His plane continued to fly and then crashed in a cemetery."

But there was something strange about the accident. Östgötacorrespondenten stressed that "it very seldom happens that a pilot is thrown out of his plane to the ground." Why? Because "nowadays pilots are strongly attached with leather belts in order not to fall out." The author supposed that Sandström, "as a careful and skillful pilot", had put on his belt. The reason why he was thrown out could be "that the belt for some reason came loose during the violent turns of the plane without the pilot noticing it." *Sydsvenska Dagbladet Snällposten makes a more hazardous supposition: "It was suggested that he could have thrown himself out voluntarily since he had lost control of the plane."

"The mystery about the accident" was the dramatic headline of an article of September 9, which related office clerk Karl Gustaf Berggren's evidence to the police. The newspaper regretted however that the witnesses' stories were too vague and incomplete to give a live and faithful image of the course of the catastrophe.

=== A stately funeral ===
The remains of the deceased were placed in a coffin and brought to the chapel of Malmö General Hospital, beautifully decorated with flowers. Ivar Sandström got a magnificent funeral. Sydsvenska Dagbladet Snällposten related the whole event in Malmö: "AT 12.30 the deceased's father and brother, Navy officers led by Commander Count Posse, gathered at the hospital, as well as other high rank officers. In the chapel, Commander Posse expressed a last thanks to Lieutenant Sandström, and the coffin, covered with a blue/yellow cloth, was placed on the hearse. Then the coffin was brought in solemn procession through Malmö to the railway station. The orchestra of the Crown Prince's Regiment played. Two of Sandström's friends, Captain C.G. Krokstedt and Lieutenant S.A. Beckman, walked beside the hearse. The deceased's father Sea Captain Bernhard Sandström and his brother followed in a coach. A great number of Navy and Army officers followed. At the railway station the coffin was conveyed by train to Nynäshamn on the east coast and then to Visby by the destroyer Hugin.

The destroyer arrived at Visby around 2 o'clock on September 7. Gotlands Allehanda's account: "When the destroyer had moored in the port, the oak coffin, covered with the Swedish flag, on which the deceased officer's sword was placed, was carried on land by sailors while a troop of honour paraded and the orchestra played Chopin's funeral march."

Crowds of people gathered in the streets to follow lieutenant Sandström to his last dwelling. The long funeral procession started to move towards the Old Cemetery. On arrival at the cemetery, the infantry unit formed a lane while the coffin was carried into the chapel. The vicar K. Thelander held a funeral speech ending thus: "Lieutenant Sandström had chosen a very dangerous activity and was well aware of the danger when he chose this profession. But he also knew that his country needs men in the place he chose. And since he was a man devoted to glory and without fear, he wanted to serve his country exercising the aviator's dangerous profession as his mission in life."

The following year, in June 1918, Ivar's friend Carl Gustaf Krokstedt also lost his life together with C. Cederström in a plane crash in the bay of Åland.
