= Ulf Sandström (pianist) =

Ulf Gustaf Sandström (born 18 August 1964) is the foremost representative in Sweden of piano playing and composing in the traditions of boogie-woogie, with a lot of New Orleans flavour.

He was born in Colombia to Swedish parents, and has subsequently traveled and lived in a large number of countries. He was taught piano at four in Hungary by the methods of Zoltán Kodály, which focus on learning by ear. His main influence and mentor in music is Clarence "Frogman" Henry from New Orleans. Notably, his live performances are often riddled with surrealistic verbality on the verge of stand-up comedy. His main group is a constantly touring quartet (jump4joy), with over 4000 concerts internationally since 1992. The group has toured since 1992, backing artists such as "Frogman" Henry, Albert King, The Drifters, Tommy Ridgley and James Wheeler. Six albums have been released on Last Buzz Records.

== Coaching ==
Besides performing, Ulf Sandström is also known as a mental health trainer. He works with people with stress, PTSD and other related symptoms. He combines NLP, hypnotherapy, havening techniques and TTT (Trauma Tapping Techniques). He is co-founder, with Gunilla Hamne, of the PeaceFullHeart Network, a non profit organisation that aims to spread TTT trauma management techniques in regions that have known a lot of war and poverty, including Afghanistan, Rwanda and the Democratic Republic of the Congo. He is also the founder of the International Hypnotists Guild.
