= World Religions and Spirituality Project =

- Founder: David G. Bromley
- Established: 2010
- Location: Virginia Commonwealth University, Richmond, Virginia, United States
- Website: wrldrels.org

The World Religions and Spirituality Project (WRSP, formerly known as the New Religious Movements Homepage Project) publishes academic profiles of new and established religious movements, archive material related to some groups, and articles that provide context for the profiles. It is referenced by scholars, journalists, and human rights groups to provide a scholarly representation of threatened communities.

== History ==
WRSP developed from Jeffrey K. Hadden's Religious Movements Homepage Project, which he founded in 1995. After Hadden's death in 2003, Douglas E. Cowan became Project Director. In 2007, it was described as "one of the largest information sites on new religious movements". In 2010, David G. Bromley became the Project Director. He expanded the scope of the project to recruit international scholars instead of local students and renamed it the World Religions and Spirituality Project.

== Purpose ==
In an article that discusses the challenge of teaching students about new religious movements, Douglas E. Cowan explains that, because of "the thousands of NRMs that exist in the world at any one time, only a relative handful are ever discussed in the various print resources […], and the Internet is, by default, the only source of information available. The issue then becomes how credible the information is that they obtain online." Websites like CESNUR, the Ontario Consultants on Religious Tolerance, the Internet Sacred Text Archive, the Association of Religion Data Archives, and WRSP are understood as examples of websites that respond to this problem. These websites serve to popularize the academic study of new religious movements.

== Special projects ==
In addition to publishing profiles, it has ten special projects, thematic or regional, which are directed by recognized scholars.

- Thematic Special Projects
  - Marian Apparitional and Devotional Groups
    - Joseph Laycock (Texas State University)
  - Religious and Spiritual Movements and the Visual Arts
    - Massimo Introvigne (CESNUR)
  - Spiritual and Visionary Communities
    - Timothy Miller (University of Kansas)
  - Women in the World's Religions and Spirituality Project
    - Rebecca Moore (San Diego State University) and Catherine Wessinger (Loyola University)
  - Yoga in World Religions and Spiritualities
    - Suzanne Newcombe (Open University) and Karen O'Brien-Kop (University of Roehampton)
- Regional Special Projects
  - Australian Religious and Spiritual Traditions
    - Carole M. Cusack (University of Sydney) and Bernard Doherty (Charles Sturt University)
  - Canadian Religious and Spiritual Traditions
    - Susan Palmer (McGill University) and Hillary Kael (Concordia University)
  - Japanese New Religions
    - Ian Reader (University of Lancaster), Erica Baffelli (University of Lancaster), and Birgit Staemmler (University of Tubingen)
  - Religion and Spirituality in Russia and Eastern Europe
    - Kaarina Aitamurto (University of Helsinki) and Maija Penttilä (University of Helsinki)
  - Spiritual and Religious Traditions in Italy
    - Stefania Palmisano (University of Turin) and Massimo Introvigne (CESNUR)
- Local Special Projects
  - World Religions in Richmond
    - David G. Bromley (Virginia Commonwealth University)
  - Student Research on North American Buddhist Communities (defunct)
    - Kevin Vose (College of William & Mary)
  - Arch City Religion
    - Rachel McBride Lindsey (Saint Louis University)
  - A Journey through NYC Religions
    - Tony Carnes (editor and publisher)
  - Community Religious Project
    - Melanie Prideaux (University of Leeds)
  - Religious Diversity in New Orleans (defunct)
    - Timothy Cahill (Loyola University)
  - World Religions in Arizona (defunct)
    - David Damrel (Arizona State University)
  - The Religious Landscape in Orlando, Florida
    - Yudit D. Greenberg and Arnold Wettstein (Rollins College)
  - Portland Muslim History Project
    - Kambiz GhaneaBassiri (Reed College)
  - Buddhism in Virginia Beach
    - Steven Emmanuel (Virginia Wesleyan University)
  - New Vrindaban Project
    - Greg Emery (Ohio University)
  - Hindu and Jain Communities in North Texas
    - Pankaj Jain (University of North Texas)
  - The Changing Religious Landscape of Atlanta, Georgia
    - Gary Laderman (Emory University)
  - Buddhist, Hindu, Jain, Muslim, and Sikh Religious Centers in Atlanta
    - Kathryn McClymond (Georgia State University)
  - Mapping Post-1965 Immigrant Religious Communities in Northern Ohio
    - David Odell-Scott and Surinder Bhawdwaj (Kent State University)
  - Pluralism in the "Bible Belt": Mapping the Religious Diversity of South Georgia
    - Michael Stoltzfus (Valdosta State University)
  - Religious Diversity in Upstate South Carolina
    - Claude Stulting and Sam Britt (Furman University)
