= Ivar Johansson (politician) =

Swedish politician (1899–1994)

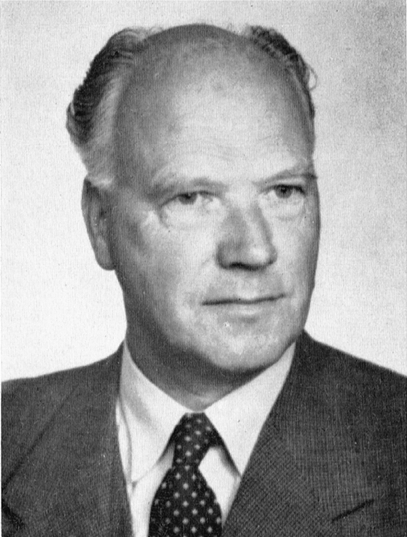

Ivar Johansson (1899–1994) was a Swedish politician. He was a member of the Centre Party.
