= Good News International Ministries =

Cult in Malindi, Kenya

- Logo used on Mackenzie's website
- Classification: New religious movement Apocalyptic, anti-Western and anti-Muslim church movement
- Orientation: Neo-Pentecostal
- Leader: Paul Mackenzie (2003–present)
- Region: Kilifi County, Kenya
- Founder: Paul Mackenzie
- Origin: 2003
- Defunct: 2019 (Mackenzie's claim); 2023 (police claim)
- Official website: goodnewsintlministries.blogspot.com (archived)

The Good News International Ministries (GNIM), also known as the Good News International Church and the Servant P. N. Mackenzie Ministries, and commonly referred to as the Shakahola cult, was an apocalyptic Christian new religious movement which was founded by Paul Mackenzie and his first wife in 2003. Following the deaths of over 400 of its members and their children at the movement's base in Shakahola, Kilifi County, Kenya, the group was designated by the Kenyan government as an organized criminal group. In October 2026, Mackenzie was convicted on 191 counts of murder and sentenced to 200 years in prison.

GNIM attracted international attention in April 2023 when it was revealed that Mackenzie had allegedly instructed members to starve themselves en masse to "meet Jesus," resulting in the deaths of over 400 people. The group, widely described as a cult or doomsday cult, was adamantly anti-Western, with amenities such as health care, education, and sports being dismissed as "evils of western life" and with Mackenzie condemning the United States, United Nations, and the Catholic Church as "tools of Satan". The group devoted much of its teachings to the end times. They were purportedly influenced by the End-Time Message of William Branham. Homicide detectives working on the case alleged the group was radicalized by Branham's teachings, leading to their deaths.

Mackenzie founded the GNIM in 2003 and accumulated a sizable following, largely due to convincing his followers that he could speak directly with God. Beginning in the late 2010s, Mackenzie's church began to receive a renewed wave of scrutiny regarding the internal practices of the organization. In 2017, Mackenzie and his wife faced several charges relating to the church. He was chastised for inciting students to abandon their education after denouncing it as "ungodly", as well as radicalizing and denying medical care to the children afterwards; several children died as a result and, in 2017, 93 children were rescued by government authorities from the group. After another arrest in 2019, he departed Malindi and headed to the Shakahola forest, where the mass starvation occurred in 2023.

Mackenzie did not join his followers in the mass starvation; a dietary menu was found on the wall in one of the special houses in the forest believed to be his resting room. He was taken into police custody as the process of exhuming the bodies continued. In January 2024, the church was declared by the Kenya government as an “organized criminal group” under the Prevention of Organized Crimes Act. Mackenzie was charged with 191 counts of murder, and he was convicted and sentenced to 200 years in prison in November 2026.

== History ==
GNIM was founded in 2003 by Paul Mackenzie, as a small church. Before the founding, Mackenzie worked as a taxi driver in Nairobi from 1997 to 2003, during which he was charged four times for his sermons but was acquitted due to lack of evidence. When the church began to prosper, he moved to Migingo Village in Malindi. Mackenzie was able to amass a large following, largely via convincing his congregation that he could personally communicate with God.

In 2016, according to unconfirmed reports, a member of the group sold their property on the island of Lamu to Mackenzie for 20 million KSh and then gave the money to Mackenzie. The preacher allegedly used this money to purchase property in the cities of Mombasa and Malindi as well as two vehicles, and to fund a television station to broadcast his message. This move by certain followers convinced several other members to follow suit, selling their properties and giving money to the church.

In 2017, Mackenzie and his second wife, Joyce Mwikamba (1981–2018), were charged with promoting radicalization, but later declared innocent, as well as denying children access to health care and education and running an unauthorized school and television station; the latter precipitated the closure of the television station the following year by the Kenya Film Classification Board. Several children died as a result of the lack of health care, and in 2017, government authorities rescued 93 children from Mackenzie's church. In 2018, he was criticised by community leaders including the then-Malindi MP, Aisha Jumwa, and other activists for inciting children to drop out of school, often without parental consent. Mackenzie was acquitted in one of two criminal cases related to these charges on 29 October 2021, while the other was dropped. He was set to have a preliminary hearing on 26 June 2023 in a case that involves incitement to disobedience of the law, being in possession and distributing films to the public which had not been examined and classified by the Kenya Film Classification Board and operating a filming studio and producing films without a valid filming license from the board.

In 2019, Mackenzie was arrested for inciting the public against registration for Huduma Namba by likening it to the mark of the beast. A number of other church leaders shared Mackenzie's position at that time. He was also accused of brainwashing and abducting children to join his group. It was after this incident that he closed his church in Migingo and moved to the remote location in Shakahola. Mackenzie claimed that GNIM had been shut down completely, but the BBC reported that his sermons continued after this date.

== Teachings ==
Mackenzie's teachings have been described as placing a profound emphasis on end-time doomsday warnings. Mackenzie's message was also anti-Western, and he railed against such "evils of western life" as medical services, education, food, sports, music, and "the uselessness of life". In a song titled "The Antichrist", he denounced the Catholic Church, the United States, and the United Nations as tools of Satan.

One media report alleged that he predicted that the world would end on 15 April 2023.

According to some news media reports, GNIM may have been influenced by the teachings of William Branham, an informal global network of churches that emerged from Oneness Pentecostalism. Investigators uncovered booklets of Branham's teachings at the commune which were pictured in a news broadcast.

While a majority of the group's adherents have been Kenyans, some were originally from Tanzania, Uganda, and Nigeria.

== Mass starvation ==
In the early weeks of April 2023, a man contacted the police after his wife and daughter left Nairobi to join Mackenzie's remote commune in Kilifi County and did not return. When police entered the community to investigate, they discovered emaciated people and shallow graves. Fifteen members of the group were rescued by police; they stated that they had been ordered to starve themselves to death to "meet Jesus". The 15 followers were in poor condition, and four died before they reached a hospital.

Over the following three weeks, police searched the 800-acre (3.2 km^{2}) commune, finding more shallow graves and additional survivors who were starving to death. The first bodies recovered from the graves were mostly children. One of the graves was believed by police to contain the bodies of five members of the same family – three children and their parents. One of the graves had up to six people inside it. Another grave had 12 children in it. Some of the bodies were not buried. Authorities also discovered a number of other emaciated individuals, including one who had been buried alive for three days and was later taken to a hospital for treatment. Local authorities began requesting assistance from other jurisdictions to help with efforts at the commune. Authorities believed that an unknown number of missing people were still hiding in the forest on the commune and evading authorities while continuing to fast. Authorities reported that members of the commune were actively trying to hinder their efforts to find survivors.

According to testimonies to police, Mackenzie told his followers "the fast would count only if they gathered together, and offered them his farm as a fasting venue. They were not to mingle with anyone from the 'outside' world if they wanted to go to heaven and were to destroy all documents given by the government, including national IDs and birth certificates." On 26 May, Interior Cabinet Secretary Kithure Kindiki said that Mackenzie hired criminals armed with crude weapons to kill followers who changed their minds about fasting and wanted out, as well as those who took too long to die.

133 deaths were reported as of 10 May 2023, including eight who were rescued but later died. The majority of deaths were of children, with women being the next largest group, according to Kindiki. He additionally stated that not all deaths were by starvation, saying that "there were other methods used, including hurting them, just by physical and preliminary observations." Autopsies conducted on more than 100 bodies showed that the victims died of starvation, strangulation, suffocation and blunt trauma. The Kenyan Red Cross reported on 30 April that 410 individuals, including 227 minors, were missing. As of 2 August, the total number of reported deaths was 427, and the number of those reported missing was at least 613. As of 15 June 95 had been rescued. On 25 May, local news outlet K24TV noted that "The exact number of people who perished in the massacre might never be known following reports that there are instances where bodies were plunged in random deep pit latrines scattered in the expansive Chakama ranch where cult leader Paul Mackenzie led an unknown number of his followers." On 18 September The Nation reported that a total of 429 bodies had been exhumed from Shakahola Forest, and that "The latest data indicates that 214 died from starvation, 39 from asphyxia, 14 from head injury, while 115 remain unascertained, and others from other causes." On 28 September The Standard reported that "A multi-agency team…has exhumed more than 450 bodies suspected to be followers of Pastor Paul Makenzi’s church."

On 24 April, search teams had to stop digging for bodies until autopsies were completed on the first 90 bodies that were found because the Malindi Sub-County Hospital's morgue was running out of space to store the bodies. On 28 April, it was reported that heavy rain was slowing rescue and recovery efforts. "Mackenzie brainwashed his converts using William Branham's End of Days Theology, and convinced them that starvation could hasten their escape from this life to be with Jesus," detectives from the homicide unit said.

Mackenzie, his third wife Rhoda Mumbua Maweu and 16 other members of his church were arrested by authorities and were being held in police custody as of 7 May 2023. Mackenzie was denied bail on 10 May. As of 14 June, the total number of those arrested was 36. They have been charged with murder and terrorism-related offenses.

Police authorities claimed that some of the bodies were missing organs, which "raised suspicions of forced harvesting". However, on 10 May, Kindiki refuted these assertions as "politicization of the probe into the massacre," and advised the public to "treat it [allegedly missing body parts] as rumours. People who have facts are those on the ground not those in offices." As of 8 May 2023, autopsies performed on 112 of the exhumed bodies ruled out the possibility of organ harvesting.

=== Criminal proceedings ===
On 12 June 2023, 65 victims were arraigned for attempted suicide. At the time, attempted suicide was a misdemeanour, punishable by up to two years in prison; the provision was later declared unconstitutional in January 2025. Roseline Odede, chairperson of the Kenya National Commission on Human Rights, criticized the attempted suicide charges, saying that "Charging the survivors with attempted suicide is inappropriate and will re-traumatize the survivors at a time when they most desperately require empathy, intense psycho-social assistance, rehabilitation, and community support." According to the Citizen Digital news service, "The prosecution made an application to have them remanded in prison because the rescue centre can no longer hold them. They are also set to undergo a mental and medical assessment and be forced to eat in prison."

On 3 July 2023, the Shanzu Magistrate Court released Mackenzie's wife, Rhoda Maweu, on a personal bond of KSH 100,000 (US$711) with a surety bond of KSH 300,000 (US$2,131). In his ruling, Shanzu Senior Principal Magistrate Yusuf Shikanda said the state had failed to prove why Maweu should continue being held with the other accused persons. Rhoda Maweu had been in custody for 62 days. The court also ruled Mackenzie and the 16 co-accused to remain in custody for another 30 days.

In January 2024, the court granted another fourteen days of detention for Mackenzie and several alleged accomplices, but warned that if he had not been charged by that time he could be released. Magistrate Shikanda noted that Mackenzie had been in custody for 117 days, one of the longest detentions without charge in Kenyan history. On 17 January, Mackenzie and thirty others were charged with the murders of 191 children who were among the deceased. They appeared at the High Court for arraignment but did not enter pleas. Judge Magure Thanda ordered that all of the defendants should undergo psychological evaluations by 6 February before they could plead. Mackenzie was ruled fit for trial and pleaded not guilty.

At a High Court hearing of the case in May 2024 the court ordered the prosecutors to reduce the number of charges from 191 to 12 in order to avoid delays and to protect due process, stating that "the interests of justice will be better served this way".

On 19 October 2026, Paul MacKenzie and 28 of his associates were found guilty of the murders of 190 children and one adult by The Mombasa Law Court. On 6 November Paul Mackenzie was sentenced to 100 years in prison for homicide and another 100 years for offences related to starvation. They will run consecutively, making the total of year sentenced 200. The other 28 were sentenced to varying prison sentences of up to 160 years.

=== Reactions ===
Kenyan President William Ruto said Mackenzie's beliefs were contrary to authentic religion. Ruto also said "Mr Mackenzie, who acts as a pastor, is in fact a terrible criminal. Terrorists use religion to advance their heinous acts. People like Mackenzie are using religion to do exactly the same thing," the Head of State said, adding that the cult leader and others like him should be in jail. He appointed a commission of inquiry into the deaths and created a task force to review the regulations governing religious organizations.

Interior Cabinet Secretary Kithure Kindiki said, "This horrendous blight on our conscience must lead not only to the most severe punishment of the perpetrator(s) of the atrocity on so many innocent souls, but tighter regulation (including self-regulation) of every church, mosque, temple or synagogue going forward."

== Second suspected Malindi cult ==
A second pastor, also based in Malindi, was arrested a few days after the Mackenzie starvation incident occurred. Authorities said Ezekiel Odero, pastor of New Life Prayer Centre and Church in Mavueni, Kilifi County, would soon face criminal charges relating to the mass killing of his own followers. Several deaths were recorded at his church between 2022 and 2023, and some theorized that those bodies were moved to Shakahola Forest. Over 103 followers were evacuated from the church premises and will be expected to give statements. As of 27 April 2023, police had not yet confirmed whether the two groups are linked.

== Further exhumations ==
In July 2025, further exhumations were ordered in the area where bodies had previously been discovered. Kenyan authorities say that 11 suspects have been identified in the investigation.

== Church deregistration ==
As of 19 May 2023, the Registrar of Societies in Kenya had de-registered Good News International Ministries as part of government's crackdown on unscrupulous churches.

== See also ==
- Rancho Santa Fe, California, site of the 1997 mass suicide by followers of the Heaven's Gate religious group led by Bonnie Nettles and Marshall Applewhite
- Jonestown, Guyana, site of the 1978 mass murder-suicide by followers of the US-based Peoples Temple cult led by Jim Jones
- Movement for the Restoration of the Ten Commandments of God, an apocalyptic pseudo-Catholic sect in southwest Uganda
- Nongqawuse, a South African prophetess whose teachings led to the Xhosa cattle-killing movement and famine (1854–1858)
