= Paul Mackenzie (cult leader) =

Kenyan pastor and cult leader

Paul Nthenge Mackenzie
- Mackenzie in 2023
- Born: 1973 or 1976; Lunga Lunga, Kenya
- Occupations: Cult leader; preacher
- Known for: Founding Good News International Ministries; Perpetrating the Shakahola Forest incident
- Spouse: Rhoda Mumbua Maweu (m. 2019)
- Criminal information
- Status: Imprisoned

Details
- Date: March 2023
- Killed: 480+
- Injured: 72

Paul Nthenge Mackenzie is a Kenyan pastor and cult leader. Mackenzie founded Good News International Ministries, an apocalyptic Christian new religious movement. In 2026, Mackenzie was sentenced to 200 years in prison for the mass starvation of hundreds of his followers in March 2023.

== Early life and education ==
Paul Nthenge Mackenzie was born in Lunga Lunga, Kwale County, as the fifth child in a family of ten children. His birth year is disputed, with identity documents listing both 1973 and 1976. Mackenzie completed his secondary education in 1994 and moved to Likoni, Mombasa, where he sold flour. He received training as a driver.

== Career ==
Mackenzie moved to the city of Malindi, where he worked in the taxi business. Mackenzie preached at a Baptist church before starting Good News International Ministries in 2003.

=== Good News International Ministries ===
Mackenzie started Good News International Ministries in 2003, with his teachings focusing on apocalyptic messages. Mackenzie broadcast his messages through television and social media, including YouTube.

In 2017, Mackenzie was detained by police after children were found to be living in his church instead of attending school. Mackenzie encouraged children to drop out of school, claiming education was not Biblical. Mackenzie's church and television station were shut down in 2019, and he moved to the Shakahola Forest in Kilifi County along with several of his supporters.

== Mass starvation and trial ==
On 14 April 2023, Mackenzie was arrested after shallow graves containing over a hundred bodies were found in the Shakahola Forest. These graves numbered in the hundreds following further police investigations. Survivors claimed that Mackenzie instructed them to starve themselves to "meet Jesus". On 1 December 2023, while investigations into the mass graves continued, Mackenzie was sentenced to 18 months in prison for distributing films without a license. Mackenzie was sentenced to 200 years in prison for homicide and starvation respectively on 6 November 2026, with the court declining to impose the death penalty.

== Personal life ==
Mackenzie has been married three times. His first wife died in 2009, and his second wife died in 2017. Mackenzie met his current wife, Rhoda Mumbua Maweu, when she was working at a Nairobi hotel, and they married in 2019.
