= Credonia Mwerinde =

Ugandan religious leader

- Undated photo of Mwerinde
- Born: 30 July 1952 (age 74); Bugarama Village, Ntungamo District, Uganda
- Disappeared: 17 March 2000 (aged 47); Kanungu District, Uganda
- Occupations: Shopkeeper, brewer of banana beer, and prostitute (allegedly)
- Known for: Movement for the Restoration of the Ten Commandments of God mass murders

Credonia Mwerinde (also spelled Ceredonia Mwerinde; born 30 July 1952–disappeared or died 17 March 2000) is the former high priestess and co-founder of the Movement for the Restoration of the Ten Commandments of God (MRTC), a sect that splintered from the Roman Catholic Church in Uganda. Before founding the movement, she was a shopkeeper, brewer, and an alleged prostitute. She and two other group members approached Joseph Kibweteere in 1989 and said that the Virgin Mary had instructed him to take them in; together, Mwerinde and Kibweteere would found the MRTC in 1989.

== Early life ==
Ceredonia Mwerinde was born 30 July 1952, in Bugarama Village in the Ntungamo District of Uganda. She grew up with a humble background. Her father was Paul Kashako, a Mukiga farmer of Catholic faith. Soon after her birth, her family took part in a government relocation program and moved to Kataate Village outside Kanungu.

At the age of 20, Mwerinde married a local man and gave birth to a daughter, Agatha; her husband soon died from an unknown illness. Afterwards, she moved in with one of her brothers, and married again. Her next husband died again soon after, possibly of AIDS. Her third husband, whom she married in 1979, was Eric Mazima, older than her and with substantial wealth. Mwerinde was his seventh wife. By 1984, they experienced severe marital problems because they could not conceive a child together, despite having at least two children previously. She began to suffer severe convulsions, which she attributed to spirits brought on by her husband's other wives. On 24 August 1988, she told Mazima she had received a vision from the Virgin Mary, who she said told her several things, including that she should immediately divorce him. She continued to receive visions for some time.

Mwerinde worked as a barmaid. According to some tellings, before founding the movement she was a shopkeeper, brewer of banana beer, and a prostitute; her actual occupation of being a barmaid is strongly associated locally with prostitution. This telling of events (that she was a prostitute selling alcohol) may have been made up by Kibweteere to make her role seem analogous to that of Mary Magdalene, or made up by those seeking to discredit the group.

== Religious leadership ==
Mwerinde was also a member of a religious group devoted to the Virgin Mary. She and two other group members approached Joseph Kibweteere in 1989, and said that the Virgin Mary had instructed him to take them in. Kibweteere did, and he was particularly struck by her claim of a Marian apparition near his home, which related to a vision he himself had five years earlier. Together, Mwerinde and Kibweteere would found the Movement in 1989. Several different accounts of how the movement was founded and how she met Kibweteere exist.

Mwerinde was part of the trio that led the sect, which included Kibweteere, and Dominic Kataribaabo, an excommunicated priest. However Paul Ikazire, a sect leader who later returned to the Catholic Church, described her as being the true power in the Movement. He said, "The meetings were chaired by Sister Credonia, who was the de facto head of the group. Kibwetere was just a figurehead, intended to impose masculine authority over the followers and enhance the cult's public relations." Mwerinde was also the source of the sect's predictions of an apocalypse and the pronouncements that salvation could only be found with the Virgin Mary's messages.

The Movement grew rapidly, and at its height membership was estimated as being between 5,000 and 6,000. Defrocked Catholic priests and nuns joined and worked as theologians. The apocalypse was predicted to occur with the advent of the new millennium. After the Movement was evicted from Rwashamaire, it moved to an estate Mwerinde's father owned in the Kanungu District. With the year 2000 approaching, sect members sold their property and turned the profits over to the group's leadership.

When the world did not end by 1 January, a crisis occurred in the Movement. Members began to ask questions and demand the return of their money and property. Police investigators believe that Movement leadership, particularly Mwerinde, began a purge of their followers culminating in the destruction of their Kanangu Church on 17 March 2000 in a fire that killed all 530 inside. Hundreds of bodies were also found at Movement properties across southwestern Uganda. Initially believed to be a mass suicide, police later stated that they were investigating it as a mass murder.

== Aftermath ==
Mwerinde was assumed by initial media reports to have survived the church conflagration. Ugandan authorities believe that she left the sect's Kanangu compound in the early hours of 17 March. In April 2000, police issued an international warrant for her arrest in connection to the sect killings. Scholar Richard Vokes wrote in his 2009 book Ghosts of Kanungu that "it is simply impossible to know whether Ceredonia, and the other leaders, did also die in the fire, or whether she, and they, simply motivated others to engage in the mass suicide, before escaping themselves." He argued most witness testimony that indicated she may still be alive was "entirely unreliable" after having interviewed them himself.

In September 2011, Mwerinde and several other prognosticators who incorrectly predicted various dates for the end of the world were jointly awarded an Ig Nobel Prize for "teaching the world to be careful when making mathematical assumptions and calculations".
