= Law enforcement in the Canary Islands =

Law enforcement in the Canary Islands consists of three security forces, the Local Police and the Civil Guard and Policía Nacional "Policia Local" & "Guardia Civil". While the former is characterised by blue markings on both uniforms and vehicles, the latter's vehicles and clothing is green, and due to the high level of tourism to the islands, both police forces possess control centres for a number of different languages.

== Recent events ==
Despite the low crime levels on the Canary Islands, there have been a number of recent events involving the islands' police forces which have made international headlines. On January 10, 1998, the Canary Islands Police on the island of Tenerife charged a German psychologist in connection with a mass suicide

The police forces are often faced with the task of deterring African migrants from illegally landing on the islands. On 7 February 2005, the islands' police force intercepted 227 immigrants off the coast of Tenerife, one of the largest of such groups to be intercepted. In late 2006, a number of other countries, including Italy, Portugal, and Finland, supplied ships and aircraft to assist the Guardia Civil in dealing with the immigrant issue as part of Operation Hera II. On April 10, 2007, Molotov cocktails were thrown at Canary Islands police patrol craft from a boat of 57 African immigrants, all of whom were later arrested when they landed on the islands.

On February 16, 2007, the islands' Civil Guard police arrested an armed man who hijacked a Boeing 737 that landed at Las Palmas on Gran Canaria. The plane landed on the island after running low on fuel, and was surrounded by police before the hijacker was overpowered by the passengers.

== Sources ==
1. World Police Encyclopedia, ed. by Dilip K. Das & Michael Palmiotto published by Taylor & Francis. 2004,
2. World Encyclopedia of Police Forces and Correctional Systems, second edition, Gale., 2006
3. Sullivan, Larry E. Encyclopedia of Law Enforcement. Thousand Oaks: Sage Publications, 2005.
