= Ghosts of Kanungu =

2009 book by Richard Vokes

- Cover of the first edition
- Author: Richard Vokes
- Language: English
- Series: African Anthropology
- Subject: Movement for the Restoration of the Ten Commandments of God
- Publisher: Fountain Publishers/James Currey
- Publication date: 2009
- Publication place: Uganda/United Kingdom
- Pages: 240
- ISBN: 978-9970-02-732-3
- OCLC: 837174529
- Dewey Decimal: 276.7
- LC Class: BX9998 .V64 2009

Ghosts of Kanungu: Fertility, Secrecy and Exchange in the Great Lakes of East Africa is a book by Richard Vokes about the cult the Movement for the Restoration of the Ten Commandments of God (MRTC), notorious for the deaths of hundreds of its members in what was alternatively described as mass suicide or mass murder in 2000. The book was co-published by the Ugandan publisher Fountain Publishers and James Currey in 2009. An ethnography of the group, the book analyzes the MRTC in the context of the wider religious background of Uganda, and attempts to show what led to the deaths.

It places the MRTC within the context of Ugandan religion and history at the time, with a particular focus on the influence of Nyabingi, a set of local religious practices utilized to redress misfortune, which Vokes argues was later replaced by and conflated with the Virgin Mary. He also focuses on how its growth was influenced by the struggles of AIDS and its background of Catholic religious influence. It argues against the commonly accepted theory about the MRTC, that there was mass murder by the groups leaders; instead, he argues that it had actually been mass suicide, and that the dead believed to have been mass murder victims were actually malaria victims from years prior.

Ghosts of Kanungu received a highly positive reception. Reviewers praised it for its writing quality and style; several reviews compared it to a detective story. The conclusions of the book were mostly praised, with reviewers calling them plausible and well evidenced, though some commentators disagreed with the classification Vokes made of the organization or its aspects. Some minor criticisms were levied at the book's clarity and open-ended nature.

== Background ==
After the 1980s, there was an increase in charismatic religious leaders and movements in Uganda. The Movement for the Restoration of the Ten Commandments of God was one of these, a millennialist religious movement, an African-initiated church (AIC) created by native Africans instead of missionaries. The group was led by Joseph Kibwetere and Ceredonia Mwerinde.

In March 2000, several hundred corpses were found in a burnt building on one of the group's compounds. Initially, it was believed that they had died in a mass suicide, but the discovery of several hundred more bodies in mass graves at the group's other locations made later investigators believe it was possibly mass murder. The leaders of the group were never found. This incident made worldwide news, but many events surrounding it remained confused, and the Commission of Inquiry to investigate the case never released a report; one reviewer argued this was due in part to how complicated the issue was, while another called it part of the "global forgetting" the government of Uganda had encouraged to avoid embarrassment.

== Publication history and author ==
The book was co-published by James Currey and the Ugandan Fountain Publishers. Following its publication, it was shortlisted for the Herskovits Award. Richard Vokes is an associate professor in anthropology at the University of Western Australia. He began doctoral fieldwork in Uganda in 2001; the MRTC suicides occurred just a week after he arrived in Kampala. He has conducted fieldwork in the Great Lakes region of East Africa as well as in the Western Indian Ocean Rim area. He received his PhD in social anthropology from the University of Oxford in 2004, and is the author of several books and collections.

The book was based on an eight year long ethnographic study Vokes undertook. In investigating the MRTC, Vokes traveled contacting former members, relatives, and others who would have knowledge of the group, while based in a village home. He learned the Runyankole and Rukiga languages and developed many relationships with the people he met while investigating. In writing the book, he analyzed a variety of primary source documents, including newspapers, archives, and photos. As many of the members were dead, he relied mostly on accounts of defectors and relatives, as well as the group's published works.

== Contents ==
Ghosts of Kanungu opens with a prologue describing the discovery of the deaths, as well as the immediate investigation and media coverage on what had occurred. Vokes tells of how he had only recently arrived in the country and was attempting to kill time when, sitting in a hotel, he saw it break on the news; he later traveled near the crime scene by coincidence but was denied entry by a policeman. The media initially portrayed the group as a suicidal millennial cult that had committed mass suicide, comparing it to several past notorious cult suicides, but only a few days later the story changed to the group committing mass murder following the discovery of the other bodies. Vokes argues this conclusion was made by the Ugandan police due to pressure from foreign journalists.

He describes the "only plausible explanation" that emerged from this period was the idea that the group's members had wanted their money returned following a failed prophecy, leading to the group's leadership deciding to kill the dissenting members – but due to increasing levels of dissent it escalated into a mass murder. Vokes calls this theory "plausible" but also "far-fetched"; in his view this led to the dropping of the case by the international media due to their inability to give a conventional narrative to the case. In the introduction that follows Vokes sets out the book's goals and what he describes as its main argument. The introduction largely summarizes the rest of the book. He notes the group's secrecy compared to other AICs, which he views as one of the stranger aspects of the case, and says this shows that the group is most easily understood as having been, for at least most of its history, a network of secret groups. The introduction summarizes the book's arguments, including its relation to Nyabingi, an organization mostly viewed a colonial resistance group active in the early 20th century, but that which actually had the primary purpose of acquiring redress for misfortunes.

With the influence of the Catholic Church by colonial missionaries, it began to fulfill the social role Nyabingi had once provided, particularly through the sacrament of confession. While the missionaries viewed Mary as an alternative to Nyabingi, the converts viewed her instead as a transformation of her. Vokes views this model of Christian thought as heavily influenced by indigenous Kiga cosmology, and many old Nyabingi practices and terms were transformed into Catholic ones. Many of these Marian networks expanded across the region with an increase in popular Christianity in Uganda more broadly, leading to an increase in reports of Marian visions.

Vokes presents the MRTC as an AIC starting as a branch of the Legion of Mary (a largely female Catholic organization). Its leader Joseph Kibweteere had experienced in 1984 a Marian vision, in which he was told by the vision of Mary that humanity had become corrupted and that the only way to save humanity was to return to the Ten Commandments. Following this vision, he left Kabale, and joined the Legion of Mary and traveled to visit other seers and communicate their visions. In 1989, he met another seer, Ceredonia Mwerinde, who told him that she had received a vision telling her she would soon meet a man named Joseph, with whom she would change the world. Vokes calls the key event in the creation of the MRTC. According to Vokes, membership was influenced by a desire to resolve infertility issues, polygamy, and illness, but was also affected by Uganda's AIDS epidemic; the area they operated in was heavily affected by the disease, and its membership rapidly grew during a period of severity.

Vokes then argues against the typical interpretation of events that there was mass murder by the groups leaders. He raises several issues with this idea, noting that though a key point of evidence was that the dead had sold all their belongings, they had done so out of desperation and had nowhere else to turn. He describes what happened as the product of both the member's influences and also the product of forces beyond them. He notes his "last revelation" as when he had interviewed a former member of the MRTC, who alongside disagreeing with a major aspect of the murder hypothesis told him that there was actually a major malaria epidemic several years prior and that this was what the bodies in the pits came from. Vokes argues that this matches up with an epidemic that occurred there in 1998, and that due to few signs of violence on the pit bodies and their advanced stage of decomposition, it was likely that his story was accurate; while he says this evidence is circumstantial, he says that it is not contradicted by any police evidence. Vokes argues that the main set of deaths were unrelated and were, in fact, a mass suicide, with little signs of resistance by the dead.

In an epilogue, Vokes discusses the aftereffects of the MRTC's actions. He says that the MRTC deaths led to many shifts in the political landscape of Uganda; local authorities emerged highly embarrassed by the affair (especially following revelations several local officials had made dealings with the organization) and the fires were used as a tool to push for district status for Kanungu as a region, which succeeded. It resulted in criticism of the government, and the religious authorities in the region began to take steps to prevent similar acts from occurring once more. He concludes by discussing some "imaginaries"; several people he interviewed described being haunted by the Kanungu dead, and notes that he has begun to imagine that "the ghosts of Kanungu have at least acknowledged my own humble endeavours, to record the details of their lives, and to make some little sense of how and why they met their final, tragic ends".

== Reception ==
The book received critical acclaim from reviewers. Richard Fardon of the University of London called it "compelling", complimenting it as "amongst the outstanding Africanist ethnographies of recent years" and "riveting from first to last". A review in American Ethnologist called the book an "excellent" example of anthropology on easily misunderstood groups and a "vital contribution to the study of the MRTC". They praised its research and said it provided an important counter to the typical "mysteries" that were discussed around the MRTC and similar groups. Shane Doyle of the journal Africa described the book as "remarkable" and "impressively researched". Following the 2023 Shakahola Forest incident in Uganda, in which many cult members died, its leader was compared to Kibweteere and there were discussions on what could lead to both such incidents. The Ugandan Daily Monitor reviewed Ghosts of Kanungu in the aftermath, praising it as a "highly readable" work and noting its focus on the context of the movement's origins.

The writing and style were praised. Katrien Pype praised the writing as fluent, noting its appeal to various audiences and saying it "extends the Africanist library". Susan Reynolds Whyte said it showed "what Africanist scholarship can be at its best", calling it a "tour de force in historical ethnography and anthropological detective work". She said it would appeal to many audiences, including scholars of Africa, Ugandans, and that all readers would appreciate the style and "detective" elements. Many reviewers compared the book to a detective story. T.O. Beidelman described it as resembling "an investigative journalistic account of a major murder mystery" and said it seemed as if much information had been withheld by involved authorities. Beidelman further complained that the book was unclear in several respects about what had happened and what had led to it, arguing that "if an author writes a murder mystery, he or she should expect the reader to want more answers than this provocative book provides."

American Ethnologist argued the book raised questions about the nature of evidence in ethnography, and raised the question of whether his distance in time from the events "facilitates or impedes ethnographic analysis". Haynes wished the book had included more engagement with literature on African Independent Christianity, or other types of Christianity; she viewed the book's treatment of these as cursory, and wished for a stronger emphasis on comparative religion.

=== Conclusions ===
The conclusions reached by Vokes were largely praised. Naomi Haynes, writing for the journal Social Analysis, said Ghosts of Kanungu was "cogently argued and compelling", calling its conclusions plausible. John Walliss, in the 2014 book Sacred Suicide, in his survey of accounts on what could have happened, says he found Vokes' theory the "most convincing" of all proposed theories, due to the quality of his fieldwork and the fact he answers the question of why there was no evidence of a 1999/2000 prophecy (instead Vokes theorizes it was 2000/2001). He describes Vokes' theory of the deaths themselves, that the bodies found after the fire were unrelated, as "without doubt the most radical aspect" of the book, noting its rejection of the usual interpretation of the events. He does note that, as Vokes himself says, this theory could be challenged by new evidence. In an analysis on violence and religion in Uganda, Kizito Kiyimba of the Journal for the Study of Religion called it the "most authoritative analysis" of what had led to the deaths, saying he largely agreed with Vokes's interpretation and that he had done a valuable job. He however argued that Vokes's interpretation may have been "overly materialistic" as well as reductionist, and that it failed to explain some aspects.

Other reviewers disagreed with some aspects of his conclusion, or viewed them as unconvincing. The journal History and Anthropology described Vokes's work as "especially compelling" in how it showed how the MRTC was subject to international influences, but criticized its conclusion as the "least convincing" aspect of the book. They concluded positively, describing it as "admirably mix[ing] history, ethnography and a sense of fundamental continuities". Grace Akello described the book as "well-written and accessible" and said its main findings were "methodologically well-grounded". She did however question Vokes' conclusions deeming the MRTC Nyabingi worshipers given that the evidence he presented and the group's own goals seemed to tie them more to the Catholic church, as well as the usage of several informants in New Zealand (who only had access to photographs) to verify some data instead of people who were at the scene. Scholar J. Kwabena Asamoah-Gyadu however questioned the assessment of the MRTC as an AIC, and viewed the descriptor as "forced" on the movement by the book. Kiyimba also disagreed with the portrayal of the group as an AIC.
