= Movement for the Restoration of the Ten Commandments of God =

Ugandan religious movement (1989–2000)

- Abbreviation: MRTC, MRTCG
- Type: African-initiated church, new religious movement
- Classification: Christianity
- Founder: Credonia Mwerinde; Joseph Kibweteere
- Origin: 1989
- Separated from: Catholic Church
- Defunct: 2000

The Movement for the Restoration of the Ten Commandments of God (MRTC or MRTCG) was a religious movement founded by Credonia Mwerinde and Joseph Kibweteere in southwestern Uganda, notorious for the mass death of several hundred members of the group in a mass suicide or mass murder in the year 2000. It was formed in 1989 after Mwerinde and Kibweteere claimed that they had seen visions of the Virgin Mary.

On 17 March 2000, followers of the religious movement died in a fire and a series of poisonings and killings, which were initially considered a mass suicide. That initial suspicion was revised to mass murder when hundreds of other bodies were discovered in pits at sites related to the movement that had died at least weeks prior to the event; the official conclusion was a mass murder, though this has been disputed by other commentators who argue that it was actually a mass suicide. Over 300 people died in the fire, while over 400 were discovered in the pits.

== Background ==
The recent past of Uganda had been marked with political and social turmoil. The rule of Idi Amin, the AIDS pandemic, and the Ugandan Bush War wreaked havoc across the country. People became pessimistic and fatalistic, and the established Roman Catholic Church was backsliding, enveloped in scandals and the faithful were becoming dissatisfied. In this void, many post-Catholic groups formed in the late eighties as a confused and traumatized populace turned to charismatic self-declared messiahs who renounced the authority of the government and the Church. An example of this phenomenon was the Christian resistance group, the Holy Spirit Movement, which fought against the government of Yoweri Museveni. The AIDS epidemic in Uganda has been viewed by scholars as particularly influential in its development; at the time, Uganda had one of the highest rates of HIV/AIDS infection in the world.

The MRTC has been classified as an African-initiated church; a highly diverse category of religious movements that stem from different Christian traditions. However, historian of religion Jean-François Mayer has argued that they cannot be only understood within this framework, because the group had connections to a network of Marian visionaries and many of its leaders were Catholic clergymen. Marian apparitions were a popular phenomenon in Uganda and surrounding countries at the time.

A former member of another unrelated sect, Paul Ikazire, would explain his motivation to join the Movement for the Restoration of the Ten Commandments of God, "We joined the movement as a protest against the Catholic Church. We had good intentions. The church was backsliding, the priests were covered in scandals and the AIDS scourge was taking its toll on the faithful. The world seemed poised to end."

== Beliefs ==
The goals of the Movement for the Restoration of the Ten Commandments of God were to obey the Ten Commandments and preach the word of Jesus Christ. They taught that to avoid damnation in the apocalypse, one had to strictly follow the Commandments. The emphasis on the Commandments was so strong that the group discouraged talking, for fear of breaking the Ninth Commandment, "Thou shalt not bear false witness against thy neighbor", and on some days communication was only conducted in sign language. Fasting was conducted regularly, and only one meal was eaten on Fridays and Mondays. Sex was forbidden, as was soap. The group believed AIDS to be a punishment from God due to a breach of the sixth commandment to not commit adultery.

Movement leaders declared that the apocalypse would occur on 31 December 1999. The group had a strong emphasis on an apocalyptic end time, highlighted by their booklet A Timely Message from Heaven: The End of the Present Time. New members were required to study it and be trained in its text, reading it as many as six times. They also taught that the Virgin Mary had a special role in the end, and that she also communicated with their leadership. They held themselves to be akin to Noah's Ark: a ship of righteousness in a sea of depravity.

The MRTC developed a hierarchy of visionaries, topped by Mwerinde. Behind them were former priests who served as theologians and explained the group's messages. Although the group had split from the Catholic Church, had Catholic icons placed prominently, and defrocked priests and nuns in its leadership, ties to the Church were, at best, only tenuous.

== History ==
=== Founding ===
The earliest origins of the movement have been traced back to Credonia Mwerinde's father Paolo Kashaku. In 1960 he claimed to have had a vision of his deceased daughter Evangelista, who told him that he would have visions of heaven. He claimed the prediction came to pass in 1988, when he asserted he saw Jesus Christ, the Virgin Mary, and Saint Joseph. His daughter Credonia also had similar visions and was involved in a Virgin Cult. In 1989 Kashaku instructed her to spread the message across Uganda on the orders of the Virgin Mary. In that year she would meet Joseph Kibweteere and tell him of their communications.

Joseph Kibweteere claimed to have had a vision of the Virgin Mary in 1984. Credonia Mwerinde also claimed to have had a similar vision in a cavern near Kibweteere's house in Rwashamaire, Uganda. In 1989 the two met and formed the Movement for the Restoration of the Ten Commandments of God, with the mission to spread the Virgin's message about the apocalypse. The group grew rapidly and also attracted several defrocked Catholic priests and nuns who worked as theologians, rationalizing messages from the leadership. Two of the arrivals were the excommunicated priests Paul Ikazire and Dominic Kataribabo. Throughout the years, local Catholic officials attempted to reconnect with members of the MRTCG.

The group, defiant towards its authority, diverged from the Catholic Church in order to emphasize apocalypticism and Marian apparitions. The group had been called an inward-looking movement that wore matching uniforms and restricted their speech to avoid saying anything dishonest or sinful. The group lived in a self-sustaining commune in Kanungu District, Uganda, with the group growing their own food and running schools. Members of the group lived mostly in silence and used signs to communicate.

=== Middle years ===
Relations with wider Kanungu society was initially tense; in October 1993 the group was kicked out by villagers, though this was only temporary. The sect grew in importance with the arrival of Dominic Kataribabo, a respected and popular priest with a PhD from a university in the United States. In order to obtain more funds for the increasing number of disciples, Kibweteere sold his three other properties, car and milling machines. By the late 1990s, the church had grown into a thriving community, set in pineapple and banana plantations. Members lived communally on land bought by pooling their assets, which they sold when they joined the Movement. Mwerinde claimed to receive messages from the Virgin Mary through a hidden telephone system that communicated through everyday objects. In western Uganda they built houses for recruitment, indoctrination and worship, and a primary school. The year 2000 was settled on as the final, compelling date for the sect's predictions of the apocalypse.

In 1992 the group was ordered out of Rwashamaire by village elders, and moved to Kanungu District, where Mwerinde's father offered an extensive property for their use. The next year the group's school was closed due to a measles outbreak. In 1994, Paul Ikazire left the sect, taking with him approximately 70 members. By 1997, according to a filing with the government, the Movement's membership was listed at nearly 5,000 people. In 1998, the Ugandan press reported that the Movement had been shut down for unsanitary conditions, use of child labor, and possibly kidnapping children, but the sect was allowed by the government to reopen.

As the new millennium approached preparations for the end mounted. In 1999, the state-owned New Vision newspaper ran an interview with a teenage member. He said, "The world ends next year. There is no time to waste. Some of our leaders talk directly to God. Any minute from now, when the end comes, every believer who will be at an as yet undisclosed spot will be saved."

== Apocalypse claims ==
With the new year looming, activity by Movement members became frenzied, their leaders urged them to confess their sins in preparation for the end. Clothes and cattle were sold cheaply, past members were re-recruited, and all work in the fields ceased. 1 January 2000, passed without the advent of the apocalypse, and the Movement began to unravel. Questions were asked of Mwerinde and Kibweteere, and payments to the Church decreased dramatically. Ugandan police believe that some members, who had been required to sell their possessions and turn over the money to the Movement, rebelled and demanded the return of their money. It is believed that events that followed were orchestrated by sect leaders in response to the crisis in the ranks.

After the passing of 1 January 2000 without an apocalypse, many became disillusioned with the group and another date was chosen by leaders for the apocalypse to occur, with 17 March 2000 being announced, which The New York Times reported the leaders said would come "with ceremony, and finality".

== Mass suicide ==
On that day, locals said the Movement held a massive party at Kanungu, where they roasted three bulls and drank 70 crates of soft drinks (most being Coca-Cola). This version of events has been criticised, most notably by Irving Hexham. A Ugandan source states that even as of 2007 "no one can really explain the whys, hows, whats, where, when, et cetera." Minutes after the members arrived at the party, nearby villagers heard an explosion, and the building was gutted in an intense fire that killed all 530 in attendance. The doors and windows of the building had been boarded up to prevent people from leaving. A neighbour who lived near the cult later recounted that the fire caused everything to be covered in smoke, soot, and the stench of burnt flesh, and that many could not eat meat for several months after the fire.

The fire alerted the Ugandan authorities as to what had been occurring in the Movement. Several days before, Movement leader Dominic Kataribabo had been seen buying 50 liters of sulfuric acid, which may have started the fire. Another party was planned for the eighteenth, which officials believe sect leaders had announced in order to mislead authorities as to their plans. The whereabouts of the five principal cult leaders Joseph Kibweteere, Joseph Kasapurari, John Kamagara, Dominic Kataribabo, and Credonia Mwerinde are unknown (all having presumably escaped).

Four days after the church fire, police investigated Movement properties and discovered hundreds of bodies at sites across southern Uganda. Six bodies were discovered sealed in the latrine of the Kanungu compound, as well as 153 bodies at a compound in Buhunage, 155 bodies at Dominic Kataribabo's estate at Rugazi, where they had been poisoned and stabbed, and another 81 bodies lay at leader Joseph Nymurinda's farm. Police stated that they had been murdered about three weeks before the church inferno, though a 2020 BBC report suggested that the bodies had accumulated over several years.

== Investigation ==
Medical examiners determined that the majority of the 395 individuals who did not die in the fire had been poisoned. Early reports suggested that they had been strangled based on the presence of twisted banana fibers around their necks. After searching all sites, the police announced the final death toll had settled at 924, six more than the Peoples Temple in 1978. Scholars have compared them to other, similar movements; in terms of the scale of the deaths it has been related to the Peoples Temple deaths at Jonestown, while in the manner and style of death it has been compared to the Swiss Solar Temple, or the Japanese Aum Shinrikyo.

The investigation was noted to be inadequate, as Uganda lacked the necessary forensic resources, and the official commission of inquiry into the case never met. The scholarly response was minimal, with only a few articles written by Ugandan scholars and two books by Ugandan commentators; most of the initial response was based on media reporting instead of firsthand investigation. Ugandan Bernard Atahuire, who lost several family members in the incident and who wrote a book on the case, The Uganda Cult Tragedy: A Private Investigation, bemoaned the fact that "[t]he interest shown by researchers is [...] miserably low. In a normal setting, an incident of such magnitude and more so the manner in which it was carried out, should have attracted a substantial amount of research interest”.

The initial suspicion that all of the members died in a mass suicide was revised to mass murder when hundreds of other bodies were discovered in pits at sites related to the movement that had died at least weeks prior to the event, some with signs of strangulation while others had stab wounds. At least 778 people died in total. After interviews and an investigation were conducted the police ruled out a cult suicide and instead consider it to be a mass murder conducted by Movement leadership. They believe that the failure of the doomsday prophecy led to a revolt in the ranks of the sect, and the leaders set a new date with a plan to eliminate their followers. The discovery of bodies at other sites, the fact the church had been boarded up, the presence of incendiaries, and the possible disappearance of sect leaders all point to this theory. Additionally, witnesses said that the Movement's leadership had never spoken about mass suicide when they prepared members for the end of the world. A survivor recalled meeting a devout member of the cult with nails and a hammer on his way after he had left the compound. It is believed he is the one who shut the windows with nails to prevent any one from escaping.

Anthropologist Richard Vokes, who wrote a 2009 book on the case following his own investigation, Ghosts of Kanungu, criticized the official interpretation of events, noting poor forensic evidence and corruption in the investigation. He argued that the pit bodies were actually unrelated to the mass suicide perpetrated by the group, given their far more advanced stages of decomposition than the bodies that had been involved in the mass suicide and the fact that no autopsies had actually been done on any of the pit bodies; instead, he argued they were actually the buried victims of an especially severe malaria epidemic from years prior, which a former member of the MRTC he had interviewed had discussed with him. John Walliss, in a 2014 analysis of the hypotheses relating to the group, viewed Vokes' theory as the most convincing, though noted future evidence could dispute it.

== Aftermath ==
The Ugandan government responded with condemnation. President Yoweri Museveni called the event a "mass murder by these priests for monetary gain". Vice president Speciosa Wandira Kazibwe said, "These were callously, well-orchestrated mass murders perpetrated by a network of diabolic, malevolent criminals masquerading as religious people."

Although it was initially assumed that the five leaders died in the fire, police now believe that Joseph Kibweteere and Credonia Mwerinde may still be alive, and have issued an international warrant for their arrest. In 2014, it was announced by the Uganda National Police that there were reports that Kibweteere was hiding in Malawi. As of 2024 they have not been located and no-one has been prosecuted in connection to the massacre. The 48-acre plot of land used by the cult has been incorporated into a tea plantation, but the owner has announced plans to create a memorial on parts of the property.

== See also ==
- Lord's Resistance Army
- Xhosa cattle-killing movement and famine of 1856–1857
- Good News International Ministries
