= Shakahola Forest incident =

2023 mass murder-suicide in Kenya

Shakahola Massacre
- Shakahola Forest incident (Kenya) Location of the Shakahola Forest in Kenya
- Date: March 2023
- Location: Shakahola Forest, near Malindi, Kenya; 3°06′43″S 39°33′07″E
- Cause: Mass suicide via starvation; Mass murder via suffocation, strangulation, and blunt force trauma
- Motive: Instructed by Mackenzie in order to "meet Jesus" before the Apocalypse
- Perpetrator: Paul Mackenzie
- Organized by: Good News International Ministries
- Deaths: 480 (as of 29 August 2025)
- Injuries: 72
- Missing: 568
- Burial: Several mass graves in the Shakahola forest and surrounding areas
- Suspects: 36
- Convicted: Paul Mackenzie and 28 associates
- Charges: Child murder (190 counts); Murder (1 count); Terrorism; Manslaughter; Child Abuse; Torture
- Verdict: MacKenzie: Guilty; Associates: Guilty
- Convictions: Mackenzie: 200 years; Associates: 10–160 years

The Shakahola Forest incident, also known as the Shakahola massacre, was a mass murder-suicide that occurred in the Shakahola Forest of Kilifi County, Kenya around March 2023. The remains of over 400 people were recovered, while several hundreds of others are reported missing. The ranch where the massacre took place, as well as the victims, were part of the Good News International Ministries, an apocalyptic Pentecostal group founded and led by Paul Mackenzie.

The incident came to public attention in April 2023, when family members of the movement’s congregants reported that they had not returned from visiting the church ranch, and Kenyan Police discovered multiple mass graves and emaciated survivors.

== Background ==
The Good News International Ministries (GNIM) is a Christian new religion movement influenced by Oneness Pentecostalism founded in Malindi in 2003 by Paul Mackenzie. The movement has been described as a “cult”, and engages in apocalypticism and anti-Western sentiment. In 2019, the church in Malindi was shut down by Kenyan authorities due to allegations of the church’s involvement in the deaths of children; Mackenzie was arrested and released on bond. He then relocated the church to the remote Shakahola Forest on an 800-acre (3.2 km^{2}) property named the Chakama Ranch.

== Incident ==
=== Members reported missing and site discovery ===
Some time in April, a concerned man reported to the Kenya Police that his wife and daughter, who had traveled from Nairobi to join Mackenzie's remote ranch in Kilifi County, had not returned as expected. Upon reaching the Chakama Ranch, police discovered emaciated people and shallow graves throughout the property. Fifteen members of the group were rescued, however four of the fifteen followers died before reaching the hospital due to their critical condition. Surviving members told police that they had been instructed to starve themselves to death to "meet Jesus".

=== Continued searches and exhumations ===
Over the following weeks, Kenyan police continued searching the ranch property, finding several more shallow graves. The first bodies recovered from the graves were mostly children. Police believed one of the graves contained the bodies of five members of the same family – three children and their parents. One of the graves contained up to six bodies while another one had bodies of twelve children. Some of the bodies were not buried. Authorities also discovered a number of other emaciated individuals, including one who had been buried alive for three days and was later taken to a hospital for treatment. Local authorities began requesting assistance from other jurisdictions to help with efforts at the commune.

The Kenyan Red Cross reported on 30 April that 410 individuals, including 227 minors, were missing.

On 24 April, search teams had to stop digging for bodies until autopsies were completed on the first 90 bodies found, as the morgue at the Malindi Sub-County Hospital was running out of space to store the bodies. On 28 April, it was reported that heavy rain was slowing rescue and recovery efforts.

Authorities believed that an unknown number of missing people were still hiding in the forest on the commune and evading authorities while continuing to fast. Authorities reported that members of the commune were actively trying to hinder their efforts to find survivors.

According to testimonies to police, Mackenzie told his followers "the fast would count only if they gathered together, and offered them his farm as a fasting venue. They were not to mingle with anyone from the 'outside' world if they wanted to go to heaven and were to destroy all documents given by the government, including national IDs and birth certificates." On 26 May, then-Interior Cabinet Secretary Kithure Kindiki alleged that Mackenzie had hired criminals armed with crude weapons to kill followers who either changed their minds about fasting and wanted out, or took too long to die.

By 10 May 2023, 133 deaths were reported, including eight survivors who later died after being rescued. The majority of deaths were reported to be children, with women being the next largest group according to Interior Cabinet Secretary Kindiki. Kindini also stated that not all deaths were by starvation, saying that "there were other methods used, including hurting them, just by physical and preliminary observations." Autopsies conducted on more than 100 bodies showed that the victims died from various causes, including starvation, strangulation, suffocation and blunt trauma.

Police authorities claimed that some of the bodies were missing organs, which "raised suspicions of forced harvesting". However, on 10 May, Interior Minister Kindiki refuted these assertions as "politicisation of the probe into the massacre", and advised the public to "treat [allegedly missing body parts] as rumours. People who have facts are those on the ground not those in offices." On 8 May, autopsies performed on 112 of the exhumed bodies did not find evidence of organ harvesting.

By 24 May, 91 people had been rescued from the forest. The next day, local news outlet K24TV noted that "the exact number of people who perished in the massacre might never be known following reports that there are instances where bodies were plunged in random deep pit latrines scattered in the expansive Chakama ranch where cult leader Paul Mackenzie led an unknown number of his followers."

By 2 August, the total number of reported deaths was reported to be 427, and the number of those reported missing at 613. On 18 September, Daily Nation reported that a total of 429 bodies had been exhumed from the forest, adding that "the latest data indicates that 214 died from starvation, 39 from asphyxia, 14 from head injury, while 115 remain unascertained, and others from other causes."

=== Arrests and continued exhumations ===
Mackenzie, his third wife Rhoda Mumbua Maweu, and 16 other members of the GNIM were arrested by authorities on 7 May 2023. Mackenzie was denied bail on 10 May, and the police announced plans to charge him with terrorism-related offenses. By 14 June, the total number of those arrested was 36. On 21 June, one of the suspects, Joseph Juma Buyuka, reportedly died in custody while undergoing treatment in a nearby Malindi Hospital after a hunger strike. Two other suspects were admitted on the same day to the same hospital as Buyuka, and were reportedly in critical condition.

Homicide detectives alleged that "Mackenzie brainwashed his converts using William Branham's End of Days Theology, and convinced them that starvation could hasten their escape from this life to be with Jesus," but with little evidence to support the claim.

On 12 June 65 victims were arraigned at the Shanzu Law Courts for attempted suicide. According to the Citizen Digital news service, "The prosecution made an application to have them remanded in prison because the rescue centre can no longer hold them. They are also set to undergo a mental and medical assessment and be forced to eat in prison."

On 3 July, the Shanzu Magistrate Court released Rhoda Maweu on a personal bond of KSH 100,000 (US $711) with a surety bond of KSH 300,000 (US $2,131). In his ruling, Shanzu Senior Principal Magistrate Yusuf Shikanda said the state had failed to prove why Maweu should continue being held with the other accused persons. In regard to Mackenzie and the 16 co-accused, the court ruled that they should remain in custody for another 30 days.

Mackenzie and 30 other defendants were charged in January 2024 with the murders of 191 children, 180 of whom could not be identified.

On 30 July 2025, a Kenyan court ordered exhumations of bodies suspected to be from the massacre.

On 21 August 2025, 27 shallow suspected mass graves were found on a five-acre property on the outskirts of Malindi. Five naked bodies were found across six of the 27 graves, and 10 body parts were discovered at the surface. By the next day on 22 August, authorities increased the number of recovered bodies to least nine, including two children. Five days later on 26 August, BBC News Pidgin reported that four more bodies and eight more body parts were exhumed from the shallow graves. Reuters reported that by 29 August, a total of 32 bodies were exhumed from the five-acre mass grave site.

== Reactions ==
Kenyan President William Ruto said Mackenzie's beliefs were contrary to authentic religion. He appointed a commission of inquiry into the deaths and created a task force to review the regulations governing religious organizations.

Interior Cabinet Secretary Kithure Kindiki said, "This horrendous blight on our conscience must lead not only to the most severe punishment of the perpetrator(s) of the atrocity on so many innocent souls, but tighter regulation (including self-regulation) of every church, mosque, temple or synagogue going forward."

== Trial ==
Paul MacKenzie and 28 of his associates were tried and convicted of the 191 murders. The Mombasa Law Court found them guilty on 19 October 2026. On 6 November, MacKenzie was sentenced to 200 years in prison: 100 for homicide charges, and 100 for charges relating to starvation. His 28 associates were given sentences from 10 up to 160 years.

== See also ==
- Good News International Ministries
