= Odero =

Odero is a Kenyan surname. Notable people with the surname include:

- Charles Odero, Kenyan footballer
- Ezekiel Odero, Kenyan televangelist
- Joseph Odero-Jowi (1936–2015), Kenyan politician and diplomat

== See also ==
- Cantieri navali Odero, a defunct Italian shipyard
- Odero Lal or Jhulelal (Hinduism), a Hindu deity, an incarnation of the water deity Varuna
