= Joseph Kibweteere =

Ugandan religious leader

- Undated photo of Kibweteere
- Born: 1932 (age 93–94); Kishariro, Ntungamo District, Uganda
- Disappeared: 17 March 2000 (aged 67–68); Kanungu District, Uganda
- Occupation: Leader of Movement for the Restoration of the Ten Commandments of God
- Spouse: Tereza Kuribakanya (m. 1960)

Joseph Kibweteere (1932 – disappeared or died 17 March 2000) was a Ugandan Catholic lay preacher and one of the leaders of the Movement for the Restoration of the Ten Commandments of God, a group that splintered from the Catholic Church in Uganda and became infamous after 778 of its members were found dead. Although Kibweteere was assumed to have died in the incident, the Ugandan police shortly afterwards issued a warrant for arrest against the other leaders of the group. In 2014 it was announced by the Uganda National Police that there were reports that Kibweteere was hiding in Malawi.

== Biography ==
Joseph Kibweteere was born in 1932 in Kishariro, Ntungamo District, Uganda. He attended the Catholic Secondary School in Nyamitanga, Mbarara Town; there, Kibweteere was seen as very able and social, and made many friends and social connections. In 1955, he joined the St Georges Teacher Training College in Ibanda. By this time, he had become very well known amongst the Ugandan Catholic hierarchy, and so while at St Georges he rose very quickly in the teaching hierarchy. By 1956, he had been promoted to headmaster at his first post at Rushooka Primary School, from there promoted to headmaster at the Kishariiro Primary School, before becoming the assistant supervisor for Catholic schools in his region in 1959.

In 1960 he married Tereza Kuribakanya (1934 – 10 April 2025), who was secretary of the Uganda Land Commission. They had eight children. By 1963, Kibweteere was one of the most wealthy and influential men in Catholic education in the country of Uganda. He ran for political office in 1980 and owned enough land to donate some land for a school of his own design. The Catholic school he founded and led was orthodox; at that point, KKibweteere had a positive image in the community.

During his life, Uganda experienced both religious and political upheaval, which likely influenced him. The strongest of these influences may have been religious movements that emphasized miracles and Marian apparitions. In 1984 he claimed to be experiencing sightings of the Virgin Mary. This vision had been brought to him by Credonia Mwerinde.

== Religious acts ==
Several different accounts of how the movement was founded and how he met Credonia Mwerinde exist. According to some tellings, before founding the movement she was a shopkeeper, brewer of banana beer, and a prostitute. Alternatively this telling of events (that she was a prostitute selling alcohol) may have been made up by Kibweteere to make her role seem analogous to that of Mary Magdalene, or made up by those seeking to discredit the group.

After the death of Credonia's father, Kibweteere became the official leader of the group. In the 1990s the movement strongly emphasized apocalypticism in their booklet A Timely Message from Heaven: The End of the Present Time. Hence, he led an elite circle of six men and six women deemed to be the "new apostles." These apostles had an equal number of women because of the emphasis they placed on Mother Mary as instrumental in sweeping them toward heaven. The group declared several dates upon which the end of the world would arrive; however, several of these dates came and went with no sign of an apocalypse. Reportedly, Kibweteere stated that the year 2000 would be followed by "year 1 of the new world." These and other claims had little effect on the wider world. For the most part, he remained an obscure figure in Uganda and never formally split with the Catholic Church.

== Disappearance ==
In March 2000 the group began slaughtering cattle and buying massive amounts of Coca-Cola. These events did not initially raise alarm, but they were preparing for a feast before death. On March 17, Kibweteere apparently died in the group's mass murder. A member of Kibweteere's family stated that the ostensible leader's actions had been entirely influenced by Credonia Mwerinde.

A great deal remains unclear about his story and about the movement. The BBC reported that Kibweteere had been treated for bipolar disorder a year or so before the group suicide. Although Kibweteere was assumed to have died in the incident, the Ugandan police shortly afterwards issued a warrant for arrest against the other leaders of the group. In 2014 it was announced by the Uganda National Police that there were reports that Kibweteere was hiding in Malawi.

Scholar Richard Vokes wrote in his 2009 book Ghosts of Kanungu that "it is simply impossible to know whether Ceredonia, and the other leaders, did also die in the fire, or whether she, and they, simply motivated others to engage in the mass suicide, before escaping themselves." He argued most witness testimony that indicated she may still be alive was "entirely unreliable" after having interviewed them himself.
