= Prevention of Organized Crimes Act 2010 =

Law of Kenya aimed at the suppression of organized crime

Kenyan Parliament
- Enacted by: 10th Parliament of Kenya
- Status: Current legislation

The Prevention of Organized Crimes Act, Act No. 6 of 2010, is a Kenyan Act of Parliament aimed at the suppression of organized crime in Kenya. It creates a number of new powers and crimes under Kenyan law, including the power for the government to proscribe groups and to punish those who lead, support or fund-raise for those groups.

As of 2023, there are calls for the Act to be amended to add further powers and increase the level of penalties that can be imposed under the law.

In January 2024, the Kenyan government proscribed the Good News International Ministries as an organized criminal organization under the powers of the Act.
