= Bekeranta =

Community in British Guiana

Bekeranta (transl. Land of the Whites) was a millenarian indigenous community in British Guiana in the mid-19th century, led by Awakaipu, an Arekuna man. In the mid-1840s, at Awakaipu's direction, members of the community committed a mass murder–suicide at the base of Kukenán-tepui. Awakaipu preached that the members of his community would become white in both appearance and power if they followed his leadership.

After leading the community for some time, Awakaipu eventually grew paranoid and believed others were plotting against him. He then declared that the way for his followers to become white was for them to kill each other; Awakaipu claimed that following their deaths, the spirits of the dead would rise up to the peak of Mount Roraima and reincarnate with white skin. Roughly 400 people died, including men, women and children. After the dead failed to resurrect, a party of survivors clubbed Awakaipu to death.

Bekeranta and the resulting mass suicide are primarily known from the writings of German naturalist Carl Ferdinand Appun, who was told of the incident by the son of one of the survivors and wrote about it in his 1871 book Unter den Tropen. Stories of the incident also circulated separately and Awakaipu's existence is independently attested from the writings of German explorer Richard Schomburgk. The incident has been compared to the Jonestown massacre, a later mass murder–suicide that occurred in Guyana in 1978.

== History ==
=== Awakaipu ===
Awakaipu was an Arekuna man. At the time of his death, he was 25 years old. He had the reputation of being a sorcerer and a shaman; having lived for a period in the capital of Guiana, Georgetown, Awakaipu knew English. During his time in Georgetown, Awakaipu encountered European colonists and other foreign peoples, including Hindus and Africans.

After encountering Robert and Richard Schomburgk, two German explorers, he was hired by the men for assistance on their expeditions into Guiana. They found his skills useful for their travels; at times he worked as an oarsman. Schomburgk described Awakaipu admirably, praising him for his toughness in the face of pain. The Schomburgks eventually left Guiana. After contact with the Schomburgks, Awakaipu became fixated on obtaining the power he perceived the European colonists as having.

=== Community and activities ===
In the 1840s, Awakaipu sent messagers throughout the indigenous peoples' lands, saying that he offered a way for them to acquire both the appearance and the powers of the whites, and directed them to gather at Mount Roraima. Many people from many different tribes took him up on his offer. They arrived and gave Awakaipu many resources, including knives and other hunting equipment. Awakaipu gave them pages of the London Times that he had been given by the Schomburgks, claiming they had spiritual power and functioned as charms.

Under Awakaipu's leadership, they built a millenarian community which he named Bekeranta. This name is a corruption of beckeland, "white man's land" in a variety of Indian Creole Dutch; Bekeranta meant "Land of the Whites". The Indian Dutch beke itself meant white person. Bekeranta was near where Guyana meets Brazil and Venezuela, near Kukenán-tepui. The area was difficult for Europeans to visit. Now leader, Awakaipu built himself a two-story house, establishing a harem of women on the first floor. He rarely interacted with his followers; when he did, he dressed in obscuring ritual garb.

At his direction, members of the community frequently got ritually drunk on Kasiri and danced. As time passed, Awakaipu grew increasingly paranoid and believed that he was being plotted against. He said that he would have to kill all those who were untrustworthy to strengthen his leadership. Awakaipu claimed to be in contact with the god Makunaima (the creator god of his people), who he claimed granted him immense powers; Makunaima was worshiped by the community, and was said to oppose the oppression of the indigenous peoples by the Europeans. To remedy this, they believed Makunaima wished to put them on equal ground with the colonists by making them white and giving them their technology.

== Mass suicide ==
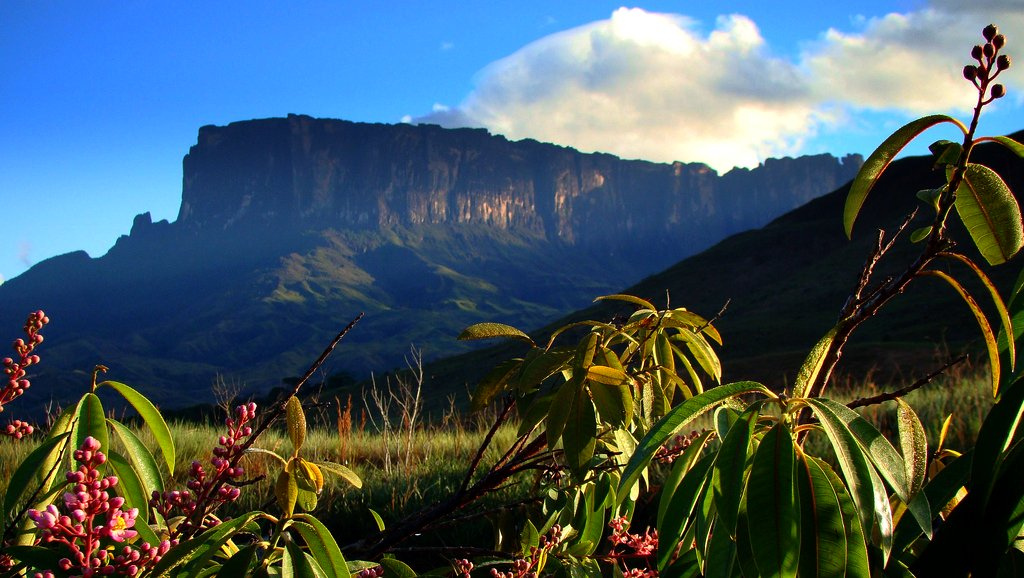
Kukenán-tepui, as seen from the base of the mountain

The actual date of the suicide is unknown; it occurred in the 1840s, probably 1843 or 1844, at the base of Kukenán-tepui.

During one drunk orgy, Awakaipu declared that the god Makunaima had appeared to him and told him that the Indians should never be driven out of their territories by the white men. In order to prevent this, the Indians would have to surpass the white colonists, to take their women, and to have white skin themselves.

Awakaipu told his followers that, according to Makunaima, this could be achieved if his followers were to kill each other. Awakaipu said that afterwards, their spirits would rise up to the peak of Mount Roraima and reincarnate with white skin, only to return to their valley two days later. With it, they would acquire the knowledge of the colonists.

According to the story, to set an example for his followers, Awakaipu killed several, clubbed a man to death, and drank his blood mixed with Kasiri. His followers fought each other and clubbed each other to death. About 400 people died, including men, women and children; over half of his followers were killed. Awakaipu and his followers waited for the others to resurrect for two weeks. After the people failed to resurrect, and with food running out, a party of survivors clubbed Awakaipu to death. The survivors then dispersed and returned home.

== Historiography ==
The incident is primarily known from a 1871 description by German naturalist Carl Ferdinand Appun. The incident was described in his 1871 German-language book Unter den Tropen: Wanderungen dutch Venezuela, am Orinoco, dutch Britisch Guyana und Amazonestrome in den Jahren 1849–1868 (transl. In the Tropics: Journeys Through Venezuela, Along the Orinoco, Through British Guiana, and Along the Amazon River in the Years 1849–1868). Appun wrote that he had previously published the story in Familienjournal, no. 869. At the time, Appen was traveling through South America while employed by the King of Prussia, Frederick William IV; he was one of the first Europeans to see the Roraima area, preceded only by Schomburgk. An Arekuna man, the son of one of the men who killed Awakaipu, recounted the story of Bekeranta in detail to Appun. The man told Appun that it had happened 24 years before (so about 1843–1845).

In 1978, the scholar Aleksander Posern-Zieliński wrote that "present-day analysis of the 1846 religious movement, while acknowledging the local cultural context and the regularities of similar movements elsewhere in America, seems to bow to the belief that the principal tenets of the story could not have been thought up by Appun, or by his Indian informants". However, he said the death figure of 400 might be somewhat inflated. Awaikapu's existence is independently attested in the writings of the Schomburgks. The version as told by Appun was noted by several other European travelers and naturalists, and it received brief mention, though little in-depth coverage, from some scholars. Anthropologist Wilson Dallam Wallis briefly discussed it in his 1918 book Messiahs: Christian and Pagan, and Brazilian anthropologist Egon Schaden wrote briefly on it in his 1965 book Aculturaçao indigena. Polish travel writer Arkady Fiedler included the story in his 1968 book Spotkałem szczęśliwych Indian (transl. I Have Met Happy Indians); British colonial administrator and traveler Everard im Thurn was skeptical of the story, seeing it as utterly divergent from his personal experiences with Giuna, but stated that he had himself heard many versions of the same story from native peoples in the area.

In the Anglophone world, the incident is primarily known from a 1958 book by the English explorer and writer Michael Swan, titled The Marches of El Dorado. Swan wrote the book after visiting the region where the suicides occurred. He wrote that one of his native guides had also told him about the incident. Swan cites works from the Schomburgks, as well as the writings of Appun. Swan wrote that:

It is a strange, inconclusive story, with no indication of the real state of Awakaipu's mind. I have no doubt of the substantial truth of the incident. Decades later, travelers in the region who knew nothing of the massacre found small portions of the London Times in Indian huts, being used as amulets – much as Christians might treasure a splinter from the True Cross.

== Legacy and analysis ==
After the suicides, the mountain of Kukenán was nicknamed "Matawi Tepuy" (lit. 'Suicide Mountain'). In 1978, Aleksandr Posern-Zieliński compared it to another native millenarian movement attempting to counteract colonization in Guiana in the 1840s. The incident remains largely obscure, both in and outside of Guyana.

Following the 1978 Jonestown mass suicide and massacre in Guyana, in which over 900 people died, the two incidents and communities were often compared. In 1983, the scholar Lee Drummond called Bekeranta Jonestown's "closest analogy", in contrast to discussion of Jonestown as a wholly novel event; he noted it as having "eerily parallels" to the story of Jim Jones. The Bekeranta location was about 400 miles south of the location of Jonestown. He wrote that in comparing them, it created a "staggering irony. Blind devotion to a charismatic leader, a community hidden away from the outside world, the leader's paranoid concealment and sexual license, the fear of betrayal that unleashes a murderous orgy, murder and self-destruction as sacrifice unite Bekeranta and Jonestown in a hellish alliance that spans the miles and years separating the two communities." He noted that in Bekeranta, "the Arekuna Indian Awakaipu established the Land of the Whites in his homeland and peopled it with local Indians", while in Jonestown, "the white American Jim Jones created a community named after himself in a foreign land ruled by blacks and filled it mostly with black refugees from white American society." He contrasted the material failures of Jonestown with the material successes of Bekeranta.

In 2018, scholar Domenico Arturo Nesci disagreed with Drummond's analysis in part, saying that Drummond's comparison of the two events was "inaccurate in relation to the death rite, as it is absolutely correct, in the light of lunar metaphysics." Nesci wrote of the incident that "unconsciously, Awakaipu promised his followers a dramatic change in their identities", rooted in the mythology of the indigenous people of the region; "the idea of dying in order to change skin and be resuscitated (after an interlunar period, like the moon) was a familiar motif in the culture of the Arekuna, as well as in other myths and beliefs all over the world."

Nesci argued that Awakaipu, like many beginning religious leaders, adopted elements brought from disaster, in this case colonization, and syncretized them with the original culture; however, due to Awakaipu's personal despair and estrangement from his society, he began the suicide plan. Nesci described the suicides as "model of ambiguity and reversal. It was not aimed at detecting the people’s faithfulness toward their own cultural matrix, but to test the truthfulness of the syncytial cultural matrix toward its own people: 'if our gods do exist, they have to resurrect us! If they do not exist, we'd better die.'" He compared it to the 1850s Xhosa cattle killings.
