= Cuquenan Falls =

Waterfall in Venezuela

Coordinates: 5°31′N 61°56′W

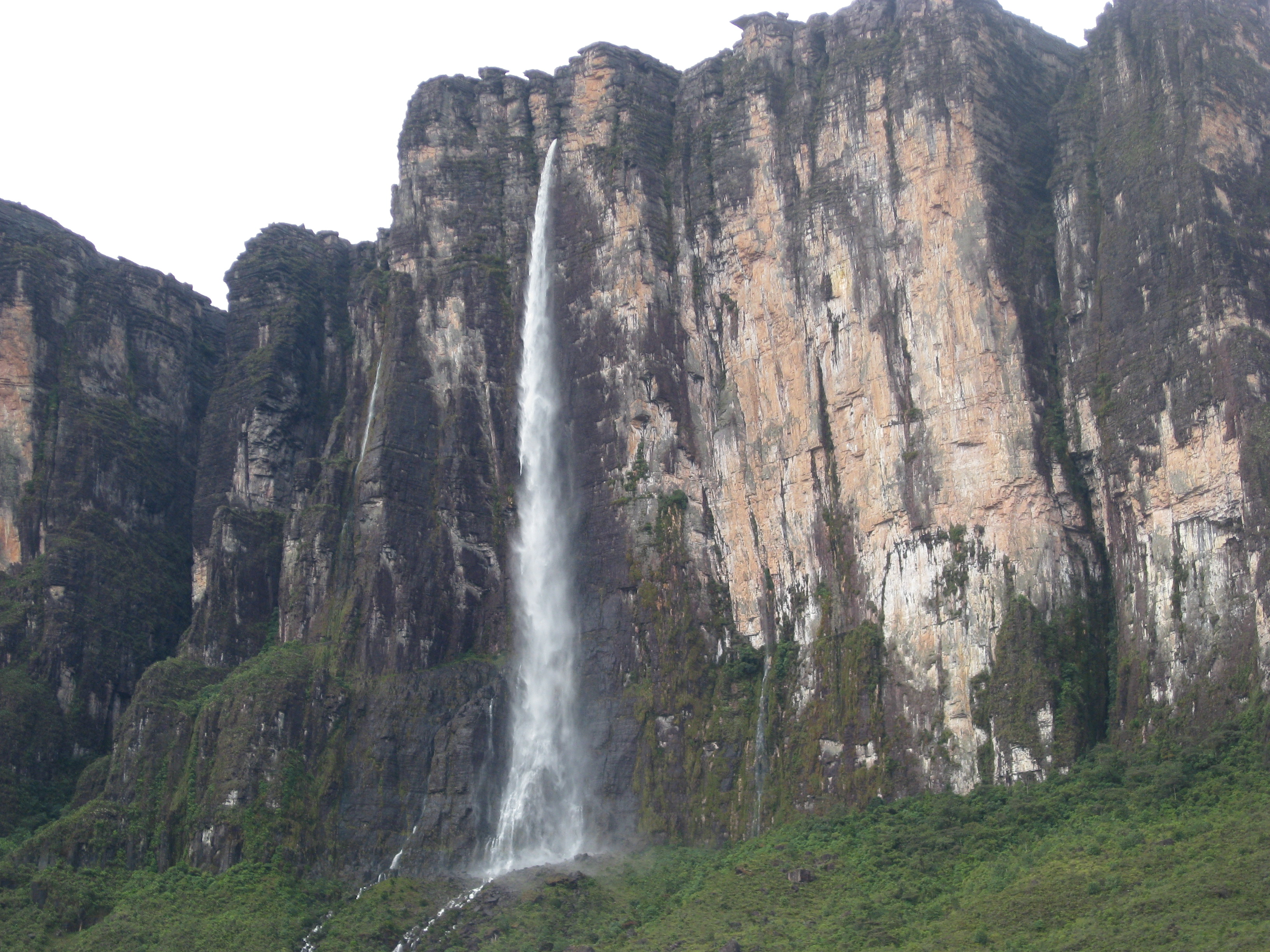
Cuquenan Falls

Kukenan Falls (or Salto Kukenan, Kukenaam, Cuquenan or similar) is the second tallest major waterfall in Venezuela after Angel Falls. It is also the second tallest free-leaping waterfall in the world. Overall, it is usually cited as the 11th highest waterfall in the world. The falls drop in a single leap of around 2,211 feet (674 m) and the final portion of the falls trickles down towards the base of the Kukenan Tepui.

The Kukenan Tepui is located near Mount Roraima, which serves as the geographical marker of the border between Brazil, Venezuela, and Guyana. Mount Roraima also hosts its own waterfall, usually referred to as Roraima Falls, which leaps off the tepui in four tiered leaps. The height is estimated at 2,000 feet (610 m).

It gave inspiration to “Paradise Falls” from Pixar animated movie “Up”.

== See also ==
- List of waterfalls
