= Ezekiel Odero =

Kenyan televangelist (born 1972)

- Born: Ezekiel Odero; Rusinga Island in Lake Victoria
- Citizenship: Kenyan
- Occupations: Pastor, Televangelist
- Spouse: Sarah Wanzu Odero

Ecclesiastical career
- Religion: Christianity
- Church: New Life Prayer Centre and Church
- Title: Pastor

Ezekiel Odero, popularly known as Pastor Ezekiel, is a Kenyan televangelist and the head of the New Life Prayer Centre and Church based in Kilifi County. He was born in 1972 on Ngodhe Island 10 km off west of Rusinga Island in the Lake Victoria of Homa Bay County Kenya. He is known for attracting large crowds. In 2023 he was arrested for alleged links with a cult and the death of parishioners in his own church.

== Early life and education ==
Ezekiel Odero was born into poverty in 1972 on Ngodhe Island west of Rusinga Island in Lake Victoria. He started his education at Ngodhe Island Primary School on Rusinga Island before attending Yeye Primary School. After completing his primary education, he attended Miwani High School in Chemelil, Kisumu County. Odero then attended Mombasa Polytechnic to pursue a career in chemical processing technology.

== New Life Prayer Centre church activities ==
=== Alleged link to Malindi religious cult ===
On 26 April 2023, Odero was accused to be linked to the Malindi cult and its leader, Paul Nthenge Mackenzie, following over 110 killings and mass starvation in the same month committed by the McKenzi cult. On 30 April, the Kenya Red Cross Society stated that more than 400 people had been reported missing. Following the linking, Odero was arrested on 27 April and his church was shut down. At the time, the Kenyan minister of the interior announced that over 100 people had been holed up in his church but had since been evacuated. On 28 April, Odero was charged with mass killings, but the police sought 30 more days to complete their investigations. He will remain in custody until 2 May, when the court will rule on whether to release him on bail.

According to Kenyan authorities, Odero has a private morgue, and some of his followers are suspected to have been buried in shallow graves in an 800-acre forest near his church. During the investigations at the morgue, police established that some of his church officials dropped bodies at the morgue and could not account for the bodies' whereabouts.

=== Admission about deaths ===
On 29 April 2023, Odero admitted that at least 15 people had died within the premises of his church. Through his lawyers, he stated that the 15 people who died were sick people who came seeking prayers.

=== Church deregistration ===
On 18 August of 2023, the Registrar of Societies in Kenya deregistered Ezekiel's church, Newlife Prayer Centre. Other churches deregistered included Good News International Ministries that was involved is the Shakahola cult. This came following the government's effort to regulate unscrupulous churches.
