= Kukenán-tepui =

Mountain in Venezuela

Kukenán Tepui
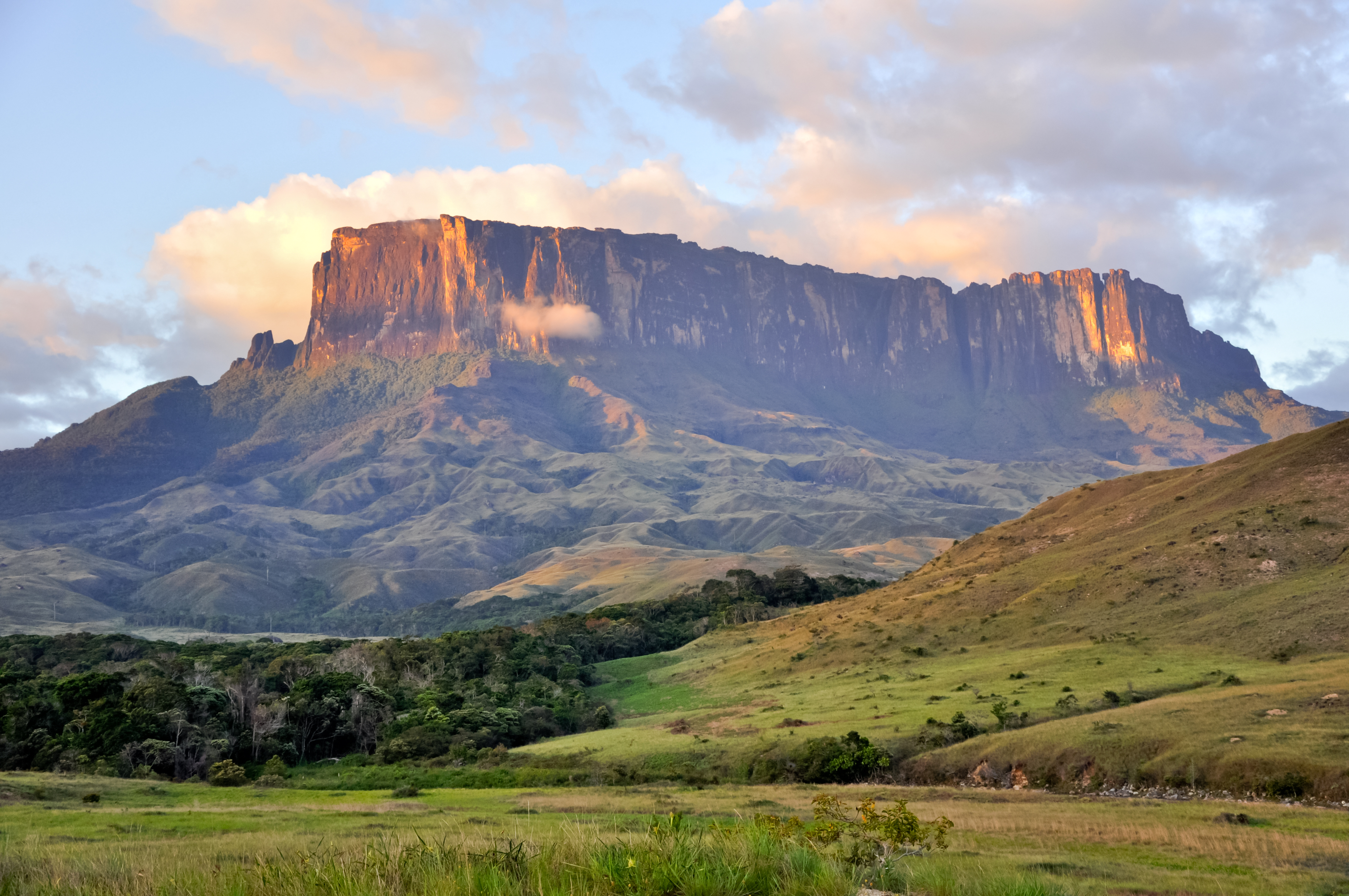
- Kukenan Tepui

Highest point
- Elevation: 2,680 m (8,790 ft)
- Coordinates: 5°12′36.38″N 60°49′52.18″W

Geography
- Location within Venezuela
- Location: Venezuela
- Parent range: Guyana Highlands

Geology
- Mountain type: Plateau

Climbing
- Easiest route: Hike

Kukenán, also known as Matawi or Cuquenán, is a tepui in Bolívar State, Guayana Region, Venezuela. It has an estimated surface area of 2185 hectares (equivalent to 21.85 square kilometres). It is 2,680 metres (8,790 ft) high and about 3 km (1.9 mi) long. Kukenan Falls, which is 674 m (2,211 ft) high, is located at the south end of the tepui.

Kukenán was climbed in 1972 by Stephen Platt, Hans Schwarzer and Ramon Blanco, with Ambrosio Perez, A Pemon Indian guide. The first ascent may have been in 1963 by a party from Bangor University. Kukenán was closed to climbers in 1997 on safety and environmental grounds.

Kukenán is located in Canaima National Park. Next to Kukenán, to the southeast, is Mount Roraima, a better known tepui. Kukenán is more difficult to climb, so it is ascended much less frequently than Mount Roraima.

Canaima National Park is also home to the highest waterfall in the world, which is located in Auyán Tepui.

In the 1840s, the Bekeranta community committed mass murder-suicide at the base of the mountain.

Scenery on top of Kukenán provided inspiration for the 2009 film Up.

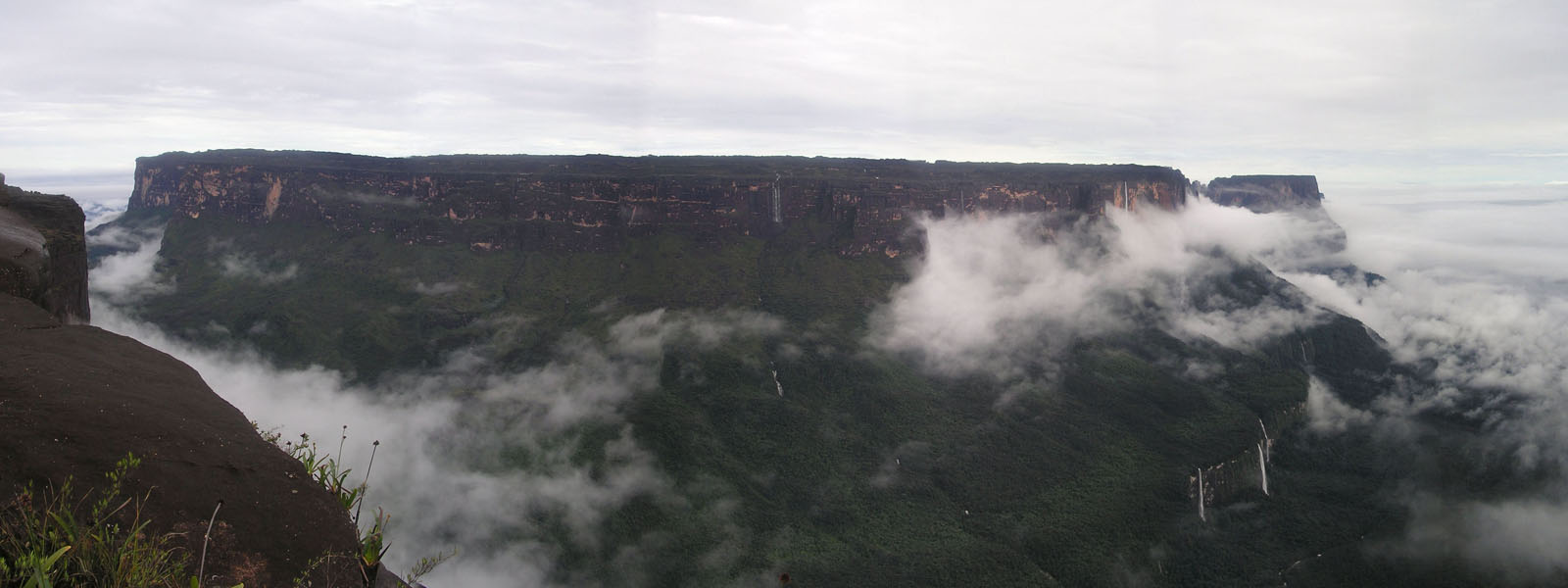
Kukenán-tepui as seen from Mount Roraima

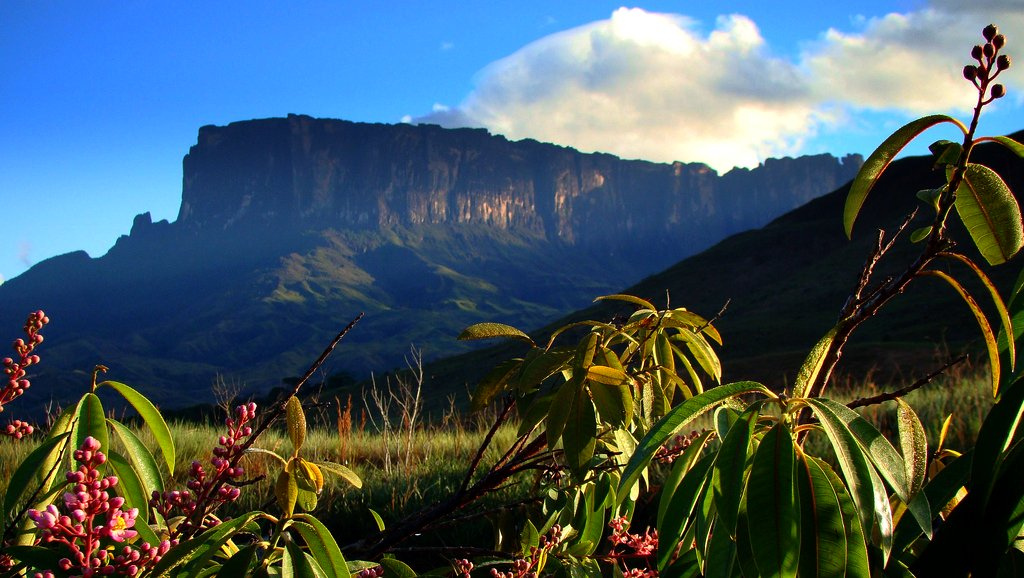
Kukenán viewed from the base

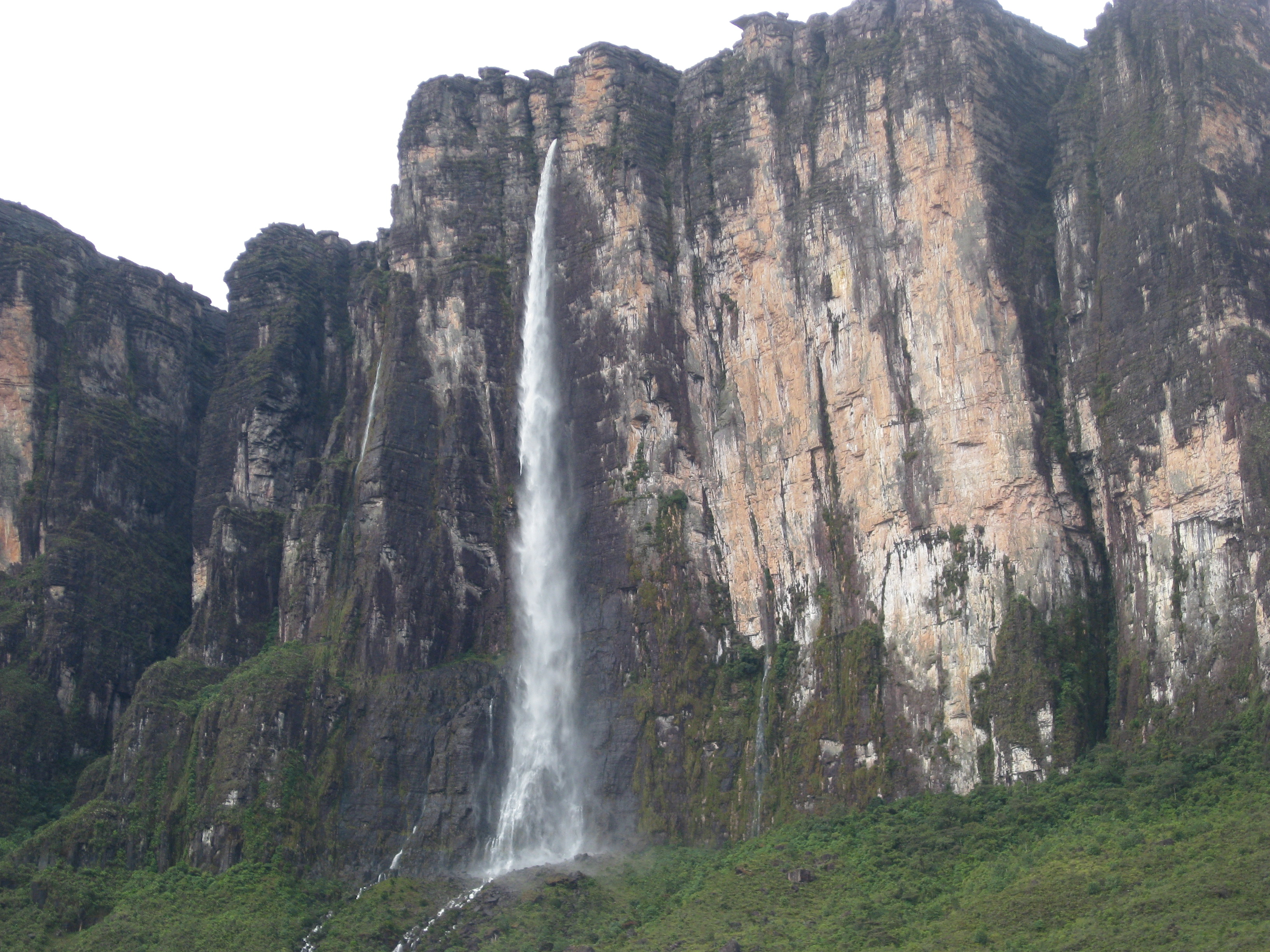
Kukenán Falls

== See also ==
- Gran Sabana
