= Huduma Kenya =

Kenyan government service

Kenyan Services
- Huduma Kenya

Governmental Services overview
- Formed: November 7, 2013
- Employees: 1,000–5,000
- Annual budget: 2.4 billion Ksh
- Website: Official website

The Huduma Kenya ("Kenyan Services") program is a Kenyan Vision 2030 project which aims to expand access to governmental services in Kenya. It was established on November 7, 2013, by President Uhuru Kenyatta; its establishment coincided with the launch of the first Huduma Centre at the General Post Office in Nairobi.

== Goals and methods ==
The Huduma Kenya project aims to expand and improve access to Kenyan governmental services by providing centralized "one-stop shops" from which a wide variety of governmental services can be accessed. The project seeks to establish Huduma Centres, government offices which provide an array of governmental service. The project is also engaged in building an app which will allow citizens to access certain public services from their phones. The Ministry of Public Service, Youth, and Gender Affairs is coordinating implementation of the Programme.

As of February 7, 2017, there were 45 Huduma Centres serving 41 of Kenya's 47 counties. 66 services, including issuing business permits and filing tax returns, are offered across the entire suite of Huduma Centres, with any given Centre offering at least 30. Certain Centers provide medical services in partnership with the Red Cross.

== Huduma Namba ==
Huduma Namba is a Kenyan governmental program in which a unique personal identification number is randomly assigned to every citizen at birth or upon registration/enrollment in the program. The Huduma Card will enable individuals to access various government services as well as use it as a travel document within the East African region. The card will have a person's data encoded in an electronic chip, eliminating the requirement for other identification methods.
