= Mass suicide =

Groups of people killing themselves together

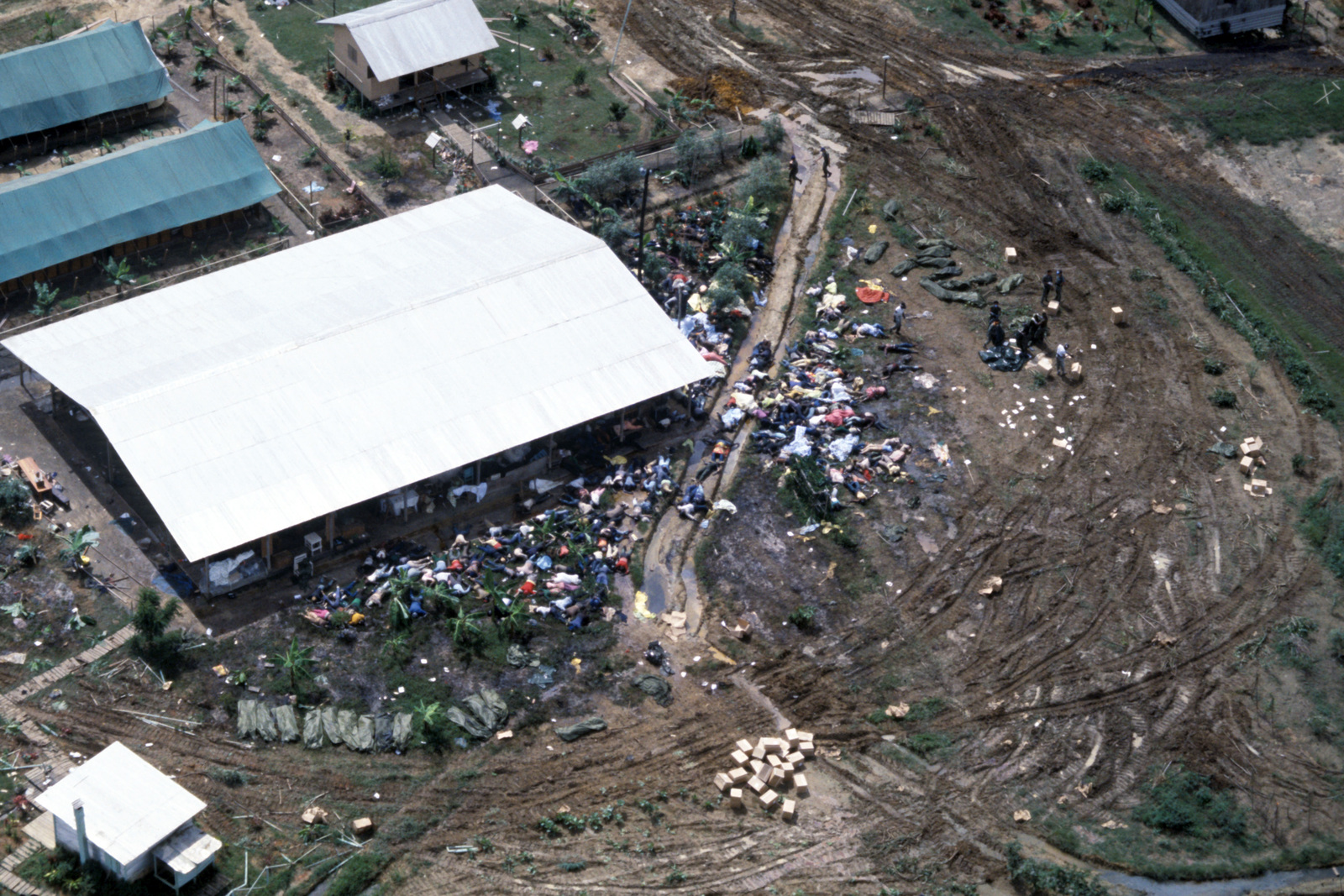
Aerial view of the Jonestown mass suicide victims.

Mass suicide is a form of suicide, occurring when a group of people simultaneously kill themselves. Mass suicide sometimes occurs in religious settings. In war, defeated groups may resort to mass suicide rather than being captured. Suicide pacts are a form of mass suicide that are sometimes planned or carried out by small groups of depressed or hopeless people. Mass suicides have been used as a form of political protest.

Attitudes towards mass suicide change according to place and circumstance. People who resort to mass suicide rather than submit to what they consider intolerable oppression sometimes become the focus of a heroic myth. Such mass suicides might also win the grudging respect of the victors. On the other hand, the act of people resorting to mass suicide without being threatened – especially, when driven to this step by a charismatic religious leader, for reasons which often seem obscure – tends to be regarded far more negatively.

== Historical mass suicides ==
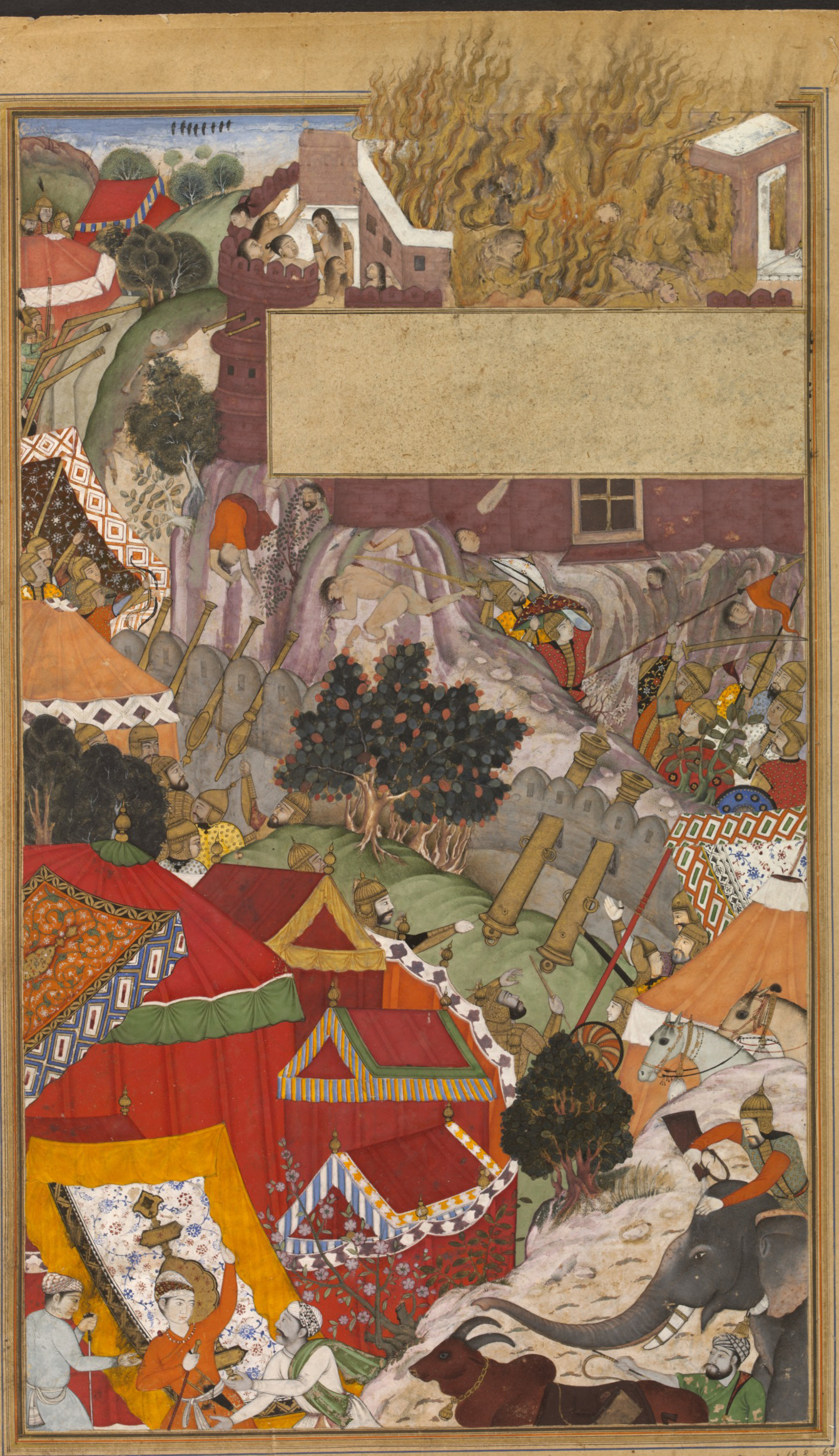
The self-immolation (jauhar) of the Hindu women, during the Siege of Chittorgarh in 1568

- Following the destruction of the Iberian city of Illiturgis by Roman General Publius Cornelius Scipio in 206 BC, people of Astapa – knowing they faced a similar fate – decided to burn the city with all of its treasures and then kill themselves.
- According to Roman historians, after the Battle of Aquae Sextiae in 102 BC, 300 Teuton women committed mass suicide following their loss.
- At the end of the fifteen months of the siege of Numantia in summer 133 BC, many of the defeated Numantines preferred to kill themselves instead of surrendering to the Romans and set fire to the city.
- The 960 members of the Sicarii Jewish community at Masada collectively killed themselves in 73 AD rather than be conquered and enslaved by the Romans. Each man killed his wife and children, then the men drew lots and killed each other until the last man killed himself. Some modern scholars have questioned this account of the events.
- In the 700s, the remnants of the Montanists were ordered by Byzantine Emperor Leo III to leave their religion and join orthodox Christianity. They refused, locked themselves in their places of worship, and set them on fire.
- In India, a mass suicide, also known as Jauhar, was carried out by women and men of the defeated community, when the fall of a city besieged by the enemy forces was certain. Some of the known cases of Jauhar of Rajput women are at the fort of Chittaur in Rajasthan, in 1303, in 1535, and 1568.
- In 1336, when the castle of Pilėnai in the Grand Duchy of Lithuania was besieged by the army of the Teutonic Knights, the defenders, led by the Duke Margiris, realized that it was impossible to defend themselves any longer and made the decision to kill themselves, as well as to set the castle on fire in order to destroy all of their possessions, and anything of value to the enemy.
- In 1792, Revolutionary France abolished slavery in its Caribbean colonies. However, in 1802 Napoleon decided to restore slavery. In Guadeloupe, former slaves who refused to be re-enslaved started a rebellion, led by Louis Delgrès, and for some time resisted the French Army sent to suppress them – but finally realized that they could not win, and still they refused to surrender. At the Battle of Matouba on 28 May 1802, Delgrès and his followers – 400 men and some women – ignited their gunpowder stores, killing themselves while attempting to kill as many of the French troops as possible.
- A Balinese mass ritual suicide is called a puputan. Major puputan occurred in 1906–1908 when Balinese kingdoms faced overwhelming Dutch colonial forces. The root of the Balinese term puputan is puput, meaning 'finishing' or 'ending'. It is an act that is more symbolic than strategic; the Balinese are "a people whose genius for theatre is unsurpassed" and a puputan is viewed as "the last act of a tragic dance-drama".
- In 1803, during the Turkish rule of Greece and shortly before the Greek War of Independence, about 60 women from Souli, pursued by the Ottomans, ascended the mount Zalongo, threw their children over the precipice and then jumped themselves, to avoid capture – an event known as the Dance of Zalongo.
- During the Greek resistance during the Greek genocide, in April 1917, a large force of the Turkish army was sent by Refet Bele Pasha and commanded by Mehmet Ali encircled the monastery of the Theotokos near the village of Otkaya. There, a cave called "Cave of the Virgin Mary" was located, where 600–650 unarmed men, women and children were hiding, protected by 60 armed guerrillas. Turkish villagers informed the army of this hiding place, which was afterwards surrounded by 350 gendarmes under Dalip Çavuş. The guerrillas, however, successfully repelled all Turkish attacks for about a week, after which a regular army regiment equipped with artillery was brought in. After two further days of fighting, the defenders were running out of ammunition and the artillery had widened the cave entrance. Seeing that the situation was hopeless, the guerrillas raised a white flag and committed collective suicide, in hopes that the Turks spare the civilians. However, when the Turks entered the cave, they proceeded to rape the young girls and women, shoot the children, and behead the men.
- In the final phase of the 1943 Warsaw Ghetto Uprising, many of the fighters besieged in the "bunker" at Miła 18 killed themselves by ingesting poison rather than surrender to the Nazis.
- Germany experienced waves of suicides during the final days of the Nazi regime in 1945. The suicides included various leaders, with Adolf Hitler and his longtime companion Eva Braun committing suicide on 30 April 1945. On 1 May 1945, about 1,000 residents of Demmin, Germany, committed mass suicide in the advent of the Red Army's capture of the town.
- During the 1 April – 22 June 1945 Battle of Okinawa, many of the island's civilians committed mass suicide using grenades or jumping off cliffs rather than be captured by the invading American forces. This was encouraged by the Japanese Army, which distributed hand grenades to Okinawan civilians.
- During the final days of the 15 June – 9 July 1944 Battle of Saipan in World War II, over 1,000 Japanese citizens would die in mass suicides, many throwing themselves off the "Suicide Cliff" and "Banzai Cliff".
- During the 1947 partition of India, 90 women committed mass suicide by drowning themselves.

== Religiously motivated suicides ==
=== Old Believers (17th–18th centuries) ===
During the Great Schism of the Russian Church, entire villages of Old Believers burned themselves to death in an act known as "fire baptism". This act took place over several decades. At least 20,000 Old Believers would die due to this practice.

=== Bekeranta (1840s) ===
In 19th century British Guiana, Awakaipu, an Arekuna shaman, established a settlement of indigenous tribesmen called Bekeranta (Berbice Creole Dutch meaning "Land of the White People") at the base of Kukenán-tepui. In approximately 1843 or 1844, Awakaipu instructed his followers to violently murder each other in order to reincarnate themselves as white people. Unofficial figures put the death toll at around 400, which included men, women, and children.

=== Yogmaya's Jal Samadhi (1941) ===
Yogmaya Neupane and her group of 67 disciples committed the biggest mass suicide (Jal-Samadhi) in Nepali history, by jumping into the Arun River (China–Nepal) in 1941.

=== Peoples Temple (1978) ===
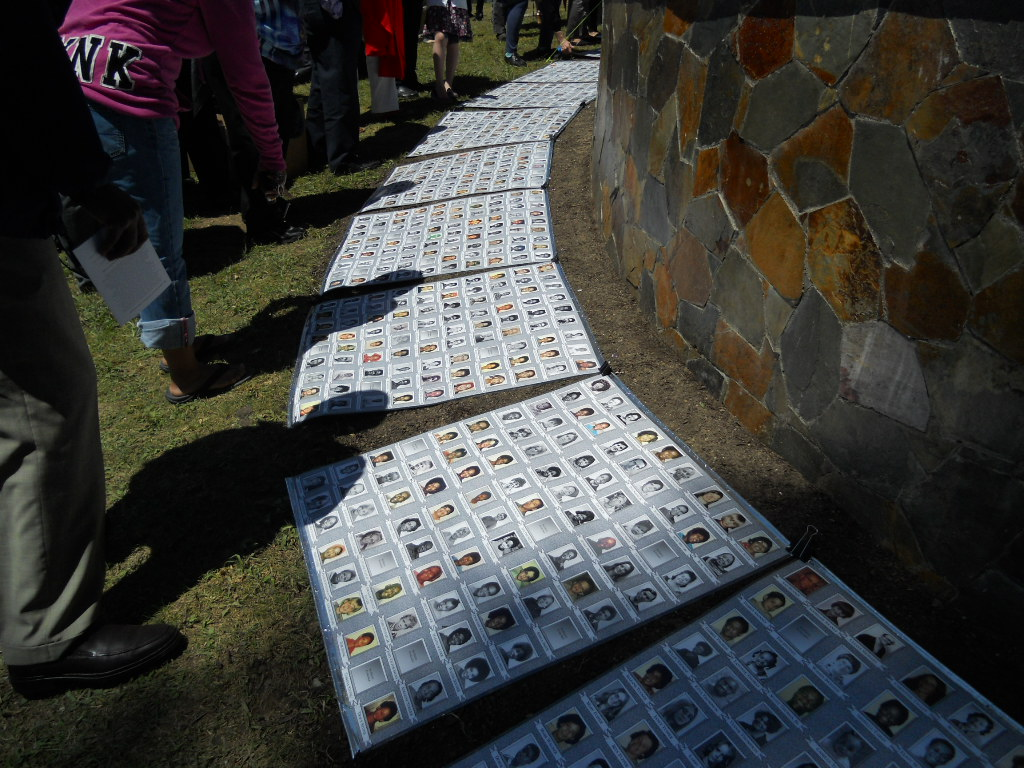
Pictures of those who died in Jonestown

On November 18, 1978, 918 people died in Peoples Temple–related incidents, led by Jim Jones, in Jonestown and Georgetown in Guyana. Using cyanide and tranquilizers, more than 200 children were murdered in the incident, and many of the elderly were forcibly injected with poison. Many of the adults seem to have died willingly, though this is contested and there was dissent. Jones declared the act a "revolutionary suicide", which had been used as a term within the group even prior to the massacre.

=== Solar Temple (1994–1997) ===
From 1994 to 1997, the Order of the Solar Temple's members began a series of mass suicides and murders, which led to roughly 74 deaths. The first occurred in Switzerland in 1994, followed by additional deaths in France in 1995, and finally a mass suicide in Quebec in 1997. The group was led by Joseph Di Mambro, alongside Luc Jouret. Farewell letters were left by members, stating that they believed their deaths would be an escape from the "hypocrisies and oppression of this world". Members believed that a death was a "transition" to another state of being.

=== Heaven's Gate (1997) ===
In March 1997, 39 followers of Heaven's Gate died in a mass suicide in Rancho Santa Fe, California. The group, led by Marshall Applewhite and Bonnie Nettles, believed that through their deaths they were exiting their human "vessels", which would allow them to advance to the "Next Level" via a spaceship they believed to be following comet Hale–Bopp.

=== Movement for the Restoration of the Ten Commandments of God (2000) ===
On March 17, 2000, several hundred members of the Movement for the Restoration of the Ten Commandments of God died in Uganda. While initially declared by the government and media a mass suicide, this was later changed to one of mass murder, due to the discovery of decomposing bodies nearby with signs of a more violent death. Anthropologist Richard Vokes, who wrote a 2009 book on the case following his own investigation, Ghosts of Kanungu, criticized the official interpretation of events (that it was mass murder); he argued that it had actually been a mass suicide and that the decomposing bodies were entirely unrelated to the group. John Walliss, in an analysis of the hypotheses relating to the group, viewed Vokes' theory as the most convincing.

=== Lima suicides (2000) ===
Between June 18 and June 27-28 2000, a family of 7 in Lima, Peru, killed themselves by drinking rat poison. The bodies were discovered on July 1 when a child threw a ball into the house and climbed the wall to recover it. According to police, the family thought that 21 year old Hans Christian Payano was a prophet sent by God to guide the family in the end of the world. The first one to die was 64 year old Armando Payano, the father of the family. Subsequently, the family killed themselves one by one, Hans being the last one. Police found rat poison, glasses with rat poison, and bowls to vomit near each body.

=== Béchard Lane Eckankar (2004) ===
In August 2004, ten dead bodies were discovered, all in a sleeping position, inside a two-story house located at Béchard Lane in the suburb of Saint Paul, Vacoas-Phoenix on the island of Mauritius. They had been missing for a number of days, and large loans had been contracted by some of the victims a short time before their deaths. Several of them were active members of the Eckankar sect. The main gate and all doors of the house had been locked from the inside, and the interior was in tidy order when police broke into the house.

=== Adam House (2007) ===
In 2007, in Mymensingh, Bangladesh, a family of nine, all members of a novel "Adam's cult", committed mass suicide by hurling themselves under a train. Diaries recovered from the victims' home, the "Adam House", related that they considered their deceased patriarch to be divine and the original Adam, wanted a pure life as lived by Adam and Eve, freeing themselves from bondage to any religion, and refusing contact with any outsiders.

=== Burari deaths (2018) ===
In 2018, eleven family members of the Chundawat family were found dead in their home in Burari, India. Ten family members were found hanged, while the oldest family member, the grandmother, was strangled. The bodies were found on 1 July 2018 in the early morning after the deaths. The police have ruled the deaths as mass suicide, with an angle of shared psychosis being investigated.

=== German cult deaths (2019) ===
In May 2019, five members of a "medieval sex cult" were found dead in what investigators believe to be a mass suicide or consensual homicide-suicide. Two bodies were discovered in a flat in Wittingen and three more, including the leader, in a hotel near Passau.

=== Shakahola massacre (2023) ===
In April 2023, 110 dead bodies were found in the Shakahola forest, near Malindi, Kenya. Rescued survivors stated that they had been ordered to starve themselves to death by Paul Nthenge Mackenzie, leader of the Malindi cult. As of June 2024, the death toll has risen to 448.

== See also ==
- Cult
- Religious fanaticism
- Puputan
- Folie à deux
