= Shakahola Forest =

Forest in Kenya

Coordinates: 3°06′43″S 39°33′07″E

Shakahola Forest is an 800 acres (320 ha) forest within Chakama Ranch in Kilifi County, eastern Kenya. Shakahola village is nearby, and the nearest major town is Malindi, located on Kenya's Indian Ocean coast.

In 2023, authorities discovered several mass graves in the forest, prompting an investigation into what has become known as the Shakahola Forest massacre.
