= Kenya Red Cross Society =

Humanitarian organization in Kenya

- Industry: Emergency Medical Services
- Founded: 1965
- Headquarters: South C, RedCross Road, Off Popo Road, Nairobi, Kenya
- Number of employees: 1,200 employees and 100,000+ volunteers
- Website: www.redcross.or.ke

The Kenya Red Cross is one of the many International Red Cross and Red Crescent Movement societies around the world. The Kenya organisation was established in 1965. The Kenya Red Cross supports and runs a number of projects whilst raising awareness to the Kenyan public about the current issues or problems which may affect them. Some of the projects which are either run by or assisted by the Kenya Red Cross are Famine, blood services, first aid projects, disaster and emergency services and education services.

The current patron of the Kenya Red Cross is William Ruto, the president and Commander-in-chief of the Kenya Defence Forces. A council administers and performs a limited number of duties, and is made up of the Secretary General and twelve voting members. All other responsibilities are held by the Board which consists of 16 persons.

To supplement its humanitarian efforts, Kenya Red Cross launched a first-of-its-kind humanitarian app, the KRCS App, which offers users real-time emergency alerts and life-saving tips, activities, easy access to Membership and Volunteerism, events and training from Kenya Red Cross, job posts plus different groups such as blood groups, youth groups and volunteer groups where members can connect and share ideas.
