= Apocalypse Observed =

2000 book by John R. Hall

- Cover of the first edition
- Author: John R. Hall; Philip D. Schuyler; Sylvaine Trinh
- Language: English
- Subject: Religious violence
- Publisher: Routledge
- Publication date: December 2000
- Publication place: United States
- Pages: 228
- ISBN: 0-415-19276-5
- OCLC: 42060958
- Dewey Decimal: 306.6
- LC Class: BL65.V55 H33 2000

Apocalypse Observed: Religious Movements and Violence in North America, Europe and Japan is a book about millennialism, apocalypticism and religious violence, written by sociologist John R. Hall. Philip D. Schuyler and Sylvaine Trinh, also sociologists, co-authored two of the chapters. It was published in December 2000 by Routledge. The book analyzes five new religious movements known for high profile acts of violence from a sociological perspective: the Peoples Temple, the Branch Davidians, Aum Shinrikyo, the Order of the Solar Temple, and Heaven's Gate.

Focusing particularly on the conflict the groups in question had with external actors (e.g. the anti-cult movement, the government) it uses comparative perspective to draw conclusions of what can be learned from the groups studied. It contains a chapter going into the history and theology of each of the five groups, with a focus on the opposition they faced. It concludes by arguing against the secularization thesis, that the world would grow past religion.

The book received largely positive reviews, with praise for the detailed coverage of the movements it profiled, as well as the quality and usage of comparative analysis. Some commentators criticized the usefulness of its analysis, or how applicable it would be given the sample pool was of five groups. It was largely considered by reviewers to be an excellent contribution to the study of violence and religion.

== Contents ==
The book analyzes five new religious movements known for high profile acts of violence: the Peoples Temple, the Branch Davidians, Aum Shinrikyo, the Order of the Solar Temple, and Heaven's Gate. In an introduction, Hall discusses the significance of the millennium in culture and its relation to the five groups.

The Peoples Temple and their mass suicide at Jonestown are initially profiled. Then the Branch Davidians are discussed, notorious for their standoff with the ATF in Waco in 1993, concluding in a fire of contested cause that killed over seventy members of the group. Hall puts forward that both Jonestown and Waco were largely the product of the groups' strife with external forces. Covering Aum Shinrikyo – a Japanese Buddhist group that had committed multiple acts of mass murder and terror against the Japanese population – they analyze the possible ideological causes of the violence and its background in Japanese society. The authors argue that Aum was something of a mirror to the negative aspects of Japanese society.

The Order of the Solar Temple is then discussed: a group that had orchestrated mass murder-suicide in two locations in Switzerland in 1994, only to be followed by two more waves in 1995 and 1997. Discussing their history, the group's desire for a legitimate front, which crumbled following several scandals in the 1990s, which lead to their investigation by anti-cult groups and governments. The authors argue that the group appealed to a desire for enchantment that had been lost by mainstream religions. He then discusses Heaven's Gate, a group that had killed themselves en masse in March 1997 in California to supposedly ascend to the next level of human existence. Hall gives a history of the group and discusses their doctrine, as well as the external opposition it faced – though Hall notes they did not experience a depth of opposition near to the degree the other groups did. He concludes that their suicides, though partially motivated by the outrage of opponents, was theological in nature; the group had, in his view, utilized their suicides as an affirmation of religious belief. To demonstrate that the adherents had overcome their fear of death, they killed themselves.

In an epilogue, Hall synthesizes information on the five groups, using comparative analysis. The book asserts that there are several "cultural logics" that drive religious violence, with one being a "warring apocalypse of religious conflict", under which he classifies the Peoples Temple, the Branch Davidians, and Aum. He also compares Heaven's Gate and the Solar Temple, describing their commonalities as striking; he views both as giving a "space-age" version of a classical salvation story, where the members would transcend the material world. Noting other commonalities in ideology, he classifies the pair as, unlike the other groups, a "mystical Apocalypse of deathly transcendence", where the mass suicide would lead to escape from earth and an achievement of grace.

He discusses the anti-cult movement, noting how state or group actions, while possibly justified, often only escalate the conflict further. He concludes that the world has not overcome religion as many propose with the secularization thesis, and that the appeal that draws people to religious groups is as strong as ever; if older religious movements do not understand the problems of the modern day, new ones will fill their place.

== Publication ==
Apocalypse Observed was published in December 2000 by Routledge. Its author, John R. Hall, was a professor of sociology at the University of California, Davis. The chapter on Aum Shinrikyo was written by Hall alongside Sylvaine Trinh, while the chapter on the Order of the Solar Temple was written with Philip D. Schuyler. The three authors are all sociologists. The chapter discussing Jonestown is based on a prior work of Hall's, Gone From the Promised Land. The chapter on the Order of the Solar Temple, "The Mystical Apocalypse of the Solar Temple", was later reprinted in a 2006 book on the organization, The Order of the Solar Temple: The Temple of Death, edited by James R. Lewis.

It was one of several volumes covering similar topics published around the same time due to an uptick in an interest in millennialism towards the end of the 20th century; other similar volumes published around the same time include Millennium, Messiahs, and Mayhem, Millennialism, Persecution, and Violence and How the Millennium Comes Violently. According to sociologist Thomas Robbins, at the time of the book's publication there were "w a growing number of scholars, generally from religious studies or sociology backgrounds" studying millennial movements, particularly in relation to violence; he called Hall perhaps "the outstanding intellectual figure" of this group.

== Reception ==
Apocalypse Observed received generally positive reviews. Malcolm Hamilton, a reviewer for the Journal of Contemporary Religion described it as taking an "original and challenging view" of well known cases, with a "sensible and logical" structure; he praised the detail included in each of the five cases. Scholar of religion Jeanne Halgren Kilde praised the book as "particularly valuable" in its usage of comparative perspective, while sociologist Anson Shupe called its analysis "first rate" with a "clear writing style". Hans G. Kippenberg, writing for The Journal of Religion, called the work "a remarkable step toward understanding and explaining religious violence".

Thomas Robbins compared the book in design to How the Millennium Comes Violently, describing that work as a "less conceptually subtle volume" in discussing similar concepts with more neat categorization. He noted that Hall discusses the anti-cult movement as an "intellectual or theoretical concept", cult essentialism, which he viewed as an improvement to the often lurid discussion of the ACM by scholars. He criticized a "discontinuity of nuances" in the book, with the analytical model perhaps needing to be reformulated to allow for more emphasis on variability in external versus internal causes. He also argued, however, that the book's analysis of Heaven's Gate as confusing, and said that though the Solar Temple was persecuted even more persecuted apocalyptic movements did not commit violence, so in his view there must be some internal factor as well. Stuart A. Wright noted the book as challenging the "conventional wisdom" attributing cult violence to internal solidarity, instead focusing on conflict between internal and external. Hamilton said that due to the differences in the small pool of groups studied, the generalization in the final chapter may be problematic. Wright believed the distinction between imaginary and genuine opponents to be problematic in the book, but considered the work overall to be "commendable".

Stephen J. Stein praised its "detailed analyses" which he called "carefully documented and highly instructive". Stein noted that the book was informed by an assumption of Hall, that the cases presented in the book were evidence against the secularization thesis (of a transition against religion by society). In a review essay by Nathalie Luca, she wished that there was more that had referred to the dynamic between cults and the anti-cult movement, and noted "the limits of participatory ethnography have perhaps been reached", but that this would require a group of researchers and would be "a real scientific challenge". Robert J. Kisala writing for the Japanese Journal of Religious Studies criticized some minor mistakes in the book, as well as what he considered a reliance on unsubstantiated accounts in the chapter on Aum, but overall considered the volume and its case studies in particular to be excellent. Hamilton said it would have appeal to scholars of religious studies and sociologists of religion, but also could attract a more general readership.

Shupe stated that the information on the individual group's was largely distilled from other sources, and that for those who already knew of the included groups there was not much new, but that the introduction and epilogue's analysis alone was worth the cost. Adam Lutzker and Judy Rosenthal, in a review of the book along with two other works, analyzed it in the lens of the concept of the unheimlich, the uncanny. They described all three book as having "improved understanding of both modernity and the wealth of social movements and social worlds that make up contemporary society"; they noted that although written by sociologists it was less focused on language than the other books they discussed, and described it as "an outstanding contribution to the political analysis of millenarian groups." Kisala disputed the usefulness of the two analytical categories proposed in the book, as the range of possibilities was "too numerous".
