= Millennialism, Persecution, and Violence =

2000 book by Catherine Wessinger

- Cover of the first edition
- Editor: Catherine Wessinger
- Language: English
- Series: Religion and Politics
- Subject: Millenarianism
- Publisher: Syracuse University Press
- Publication date: 2000
- Publication place: United States
- Media type: Print (hardcover and paperback)
- Pages: 403
- ISBN: 0-8156-2809-9 (hardcover)
- OCLC: 41592921
- Dewey Decimal: 291.2'3
- LC Class: BL503. 2.M55 1999

Millennialism, Persecution, and Violence: Historical Cases is an edited volume published in 2000 by Syracuse University Press. It was edited by Catherine Wessinger, an associate professor of History of Religion at Loyola University New Orleans. The book is about on millenarianism and its association with violence, as well as its influence by persecution. It includes 18 chapters in 5 sections divided by theme, by 16 authors, including Robert Ellwood, Massimo Introvigne, Eugene V. Gallagher, Jeffrey Kaplan, Thomas Robbins, Jacqueline Stone, and Grant Underwood.

The chapters cover 15 movements, categorized into assaulted, fragile, and revolutionary movements, as well as another categorization of nativist movements. Movements profiled include several new religious movements that committed violent acts, older religious movements, Nazis and neo-Nazis, and political movements like Maoists and the Khmer Rouge. It received largely positive reviews, with praise for its essays, narratives, and for, unlike many edited volumes, having a coherent categorization system of its contents. It received some criticism for leaving questions unanswered and for being uneven in its categorization.

== Contents ==
An introduction by Wessinger establishes the work's scope and categorization system. The book contains 18 chapters on 15 groups, categorized into three categories: assaulted, fragile, and revolutionary movements. Wessinger gives definitions of relevant terms, defining millennialism and millenarianism to be "belief in an imminent transition to the millennial kingdom (the collective salvation)."

Part 1 covers "Assaulted Millennial Groups": Mormons, the Lakota at the Wounded Knee Massacre, the Branch Davidians, and Rastafaris. Assaulted groups are defined by Wessinger as ones that were viewed as dangerous, invalid religions and were therefore persecuted; she places the blame for the resulting violence on their opposition. The Mormons are discussed by Grant Underwood, who argues that the persecution they face intensified their worldview, but that when their persecution decreased so did their apocalypticism. Michelene E. Pesantubbee covers the Wounded Knee Massacre of Lakota who had adhered to the Ghost Dance movement, with the government worrying they were a dangerous rebellion; Pesantubbee argues that the massacre could have been avoided if people knowledgeable about the faith were present. Eugene V. Gallagher writes about the Branch Davidian leader David Koresh and his theology, asserting that the responding officials did not take it into account. The Dominican Dread Act was an act designed to combat the Rastafarian movement, declaring them an unlawful group and making killing them legal; Richard C. Salter discusses how the Rastafaris dealt with their persecution.

The second part includes chapters on "Fragile Millennial Groups": Peoples Temple, the Order of the Solar Temple, and Aum Shinrikyo, all new religious movements that committed large scale acts of violence. Wessinger defines fragile millennial groups as ones where violence is the product of both the group's' internal traits and outside pressure. Peoples Temple is written about by Rebecca Moore, who had relatives who died in Jonestown. She connects it to the wider phenomenon of American violence. Massimo Introvigne writes on the Solar Temple (though with minor focus on Heaven's Gate, a similar group), who died in mass murder-suicides throughout the 1990s. He argues that their internal stresses had grown to the point that even the barest external pressures could trigger a violent response. Ian Reader covers Aum Shinrikyo, a religious movement who committed several acts of terror; Reader argues that contrary to some ideas, they were not persecuted, and the religious freedom in Japan actually benefited the group. He says instead the terror came from the group's own ideas. The third section has a single essay on "Two Nativist Millennial Movements" by Christine Steyn: the Bulhoek massacre of Israelites in conflict with police and the Xhosa cattle-killing movement, where the Xhosa, conflicting with White colonists, killed their own cattle hoping for salvation. Wessinger states this chapter was placed on its own because she could not place it with either fragile or assaulted; she also says several other movements within the book could also be understood as nativist.

Part 4 covers "Revolutionary Millennial Movements": the Old Believers, the Taiping Rebellion and Maoists, millennialism in Nazism, Japanese millennialism, millennialism in the Khmer Rouge, American neo-Nazis, and the Freemen standoff. The Old Believers, who committed numerous mass suicides in the 17th century in Russia, are written about by Thomas Robbins. The two Chinese movements are covered by Scott Lowe; the Taipeng Rebellion being a nativist one that attempted to overthrow the Manchus, while the Great Leap Forward was a communist campaign that set impossible goals, resulting in millions starving to death. Robert Ellwood interprets Nazism as a millennialist movement, and Jacqueline Stone discusses the Japanese militant nationalist usage of the Lotus Sutra that holds millennialist ideas. Salter's second chapter focuses on the Khmer Rouge and their millennial vision, and the resulting genocide. Jeffrey Kaplan writes about the development of the Zionist Occupied Government (ZOG) concept within the American neo-Nazi subculture. The final chapter of the fourth section is about the Justus freemen standoff, written Jean E. Rosenfeld, which was resolved peacefully.

The fifth part contains a single essay on "Implications for Law Enforcement" by Rosenfeld, which gives a history of millennialism and suggestions for law enforcement handling going forward. Rosenfeld argues for a more careful handling which involves understanding the millenarian movements to lessen the potential for conflict. In the afterword by Michael Barkun, Barkun argues on how to distinguish between reactive and initiated violence (out-group and in-group targeted). It includes a bibliography and an index.

== Contributors ==
- Michael Barkun
- Robert Ellwood
- Massimo Introvigne
- Eugene V. Gallagher
- Jeffrey Kaplan
- Scott Lowe
- Rebecca Moore
- Michelene E. Pesantubbee
- Ian Reader
- Thomas Robbins
- Jean E. Rosenfeld
- Richard C. Salter
- Christine Steyn
- Jacqueline Stone
- Grant Underwood
- Catherine Wessinger

== Publication ==
Millennialism, Persecution and Violence was published in 2000 by Syracuse University Press as part of their "Religion and Politics" series. Its first edition was 403 pages long, in 2000 in paperback and hardcover. It was edited by Catherine Wessinger, associate professor of History of Religion at Loyola University New Orleans. She was a former chair of the New Religious Movements Group unit of the American Academy of Religion. The book was being edited by Wessinger in March 1998. Also in 2000, Wessinger published How the Millennium Comes Violently, another book on millenarianism, with Seven Bridges Press. All of the groups profiled in that book are also featured in Millennialism, Persecution and Violence barring two (Chen Tao and Heaven's Gate). In the decade prior to the book's release, there were several high-profile incidents of millenarian religious violence.

== Reception ==
"Many of the case studies are so dramatic, suspenseful and skillfully told, they read like the denouement in a good murder mystery, when the psychological motivations of the murderer are revealed. Thus, this volume could reach the same audience as le Carré, Rendell or Dibden, for there is something intrinsically exciting and satisfying in discovering the irrational millenarian motives and spiritual doctrines behind extraordinary acts of collective violence."

— Susan Palmer, Sociology of Religion

Millennialism, Persecution and Violence received largely positive reviews. Stephen J. Stein for Religious Studies Review praised its essays, saying they were excellent examples of the varieties of millenarian violence. Susan Palmer for Sociology of Religion complimented it as "fascinating" and as a "valuable tool", and said that unlike many edited volumes it managed to "develop[...] the editor's theory in a systematic and coherent fashion". Justin Miller for the Journal of Church and State similarly praised it as a contribution to the field or religious studies as well as conflict resolution, demonstrating the need for law enforcement understanding of such groups. He praised the introduction as insightful. George Mariz for Utopian Studies was more critical than the other reviews, saying it was "a provocative volume, sure to stimulate discussion, and no doubt, other books, but it is a work with serious flaws".

Palmer said it would likely appeal to many beyond the audience of religious and new religious movement studies. She also praised it for offering several "thrilling narratives" and argued it may appeal to audiences of mystery writers. Stein argued its contents were wider than what he called the typical "sectarian canon", as "an important reminder that neither Christian nor American religious groups have an exclusive lock on millennial or apocalyptic culture, nor on the sense or perception of being persecuted"; similarly, Mariz said the book made the "important point that widespread and deep senses of an approaching apocalypse are neither new, they have been around literally for millennia, nor are they uniquely American." Miller argued that the essays evidenced that many cases of new religious movement associated violence in the 1990s were avoidable if the public and law enforcement had known more about millennial beliefs. Criticisms of what the book did not include were presented by Mariz, who said the book did not have information on several topics should (influence from communication technologies and opposition); he argued that the book left many questions unanswered, especially what he considered the most interesting ones. He did call it unique in its scope and ambitious, and singled out Kaplan's essay on neo-Nazis for praise, calling it "insightful and lively", and Robbin's essay on the Old Believers for being a comprehensive introduction. Pesantubbe's chapter on Wounded Knee he called insightful; contrarily, he criticized Moore's essay on Jonestown as lacking objectivity, Salter's as lacking information. Generally he called the work uneven in its categorization, and said most chapters "display a marked narrowness of methodological focus" by relying entirely on Wessinger's model or John Hall and Philip Schuyler's model.

Richard Singelenberg for the Journal of Contemporary Religion compared it to Wessinger's other book How the Millennium Comes Violently, calling this book "more ambitious" due to its wider scope with more penetrating analysis, though said it was complementary to it despite some overlap. Stein called it a more extended application of the categorization in that book. Singelenberg particularly praised Gallagher and Reader's chapters. He said it had "an interesting alternative paradigm for Wessinger's one-dimensional construct". He noted both this work and How the Millennium Comes Violently as departing from her earlier typology of millenarian movements —which instead of the three divisions, has two, progressive versus catastrophic, with progressive being optimistic and catastrophic being pessimistic — in an effort to better understand the relationships between violence and the subject matter. Palmer argued that this older typology was still considered here in the chapters, with the authors producing "interesting twists" on that original framework, e.g. interpreting the Maoist interpretation of permanent revolution as a progressive millenarian movement, despite the resulting harms.
