= Nova Religio =

Academic journal on religious studies

- Discipline: Religious studies
- Language: English
- Edited by: Marie Dallam, Joseph Laycock, Benjamin E. Zeller, Catherine Wessinger

Publication details
- History: 1997–present
- Publisher: University of Pennsylvania Press (United States)
- Frequency: Quarterly

Standard abbreviations
- ISO 4: Nova Relig.

Indexing
- ISSN: 1092-6690 (print); 1541-8480 (web)
- LCCN: 98656716
- JSTOR: 10926690
- OCLC no.: 36349271

Links
- Journal homepage

Nova Religio: The Journal of Alternative and Emergent Religions is a quarterly peer-reviewed academic journal covering religious studies, focusing on the study of new religious movements. It was established in 1997 by Seven Bridges Press, initially published semi-annually, changing to tri-annually in 2003, and then quarterly in 2005.

== History ==
Previously research focusing on new religious movements (NRMs; often referred to as cults) was mainly published in sociology journals, which lessened the ability for researchers to engage in more qualitative methodologies. Researchers who were not sociologists wanted a publication with a broader view in which to publish; in the 1990s, more debate emerged on how to define the term "new religious movement" itself. The journal was founded to give a broader and inclusive look at this topic in a period approaching the end of the millennium. With several apocalyptic groups gaining prominence, interest in the field increased.

The journal was established in 1997 by Seven Bridges Press, founded by Phillip Lucas and Catherine Wessinger. The journal came out of the American Academy of Religion NRM program unit. The name was chosen to include both historical "new religions" and modern ones, given the controversial nature of naming in the field itself. The team founding the journal believed that "it was not their place to judge whose religion is sane, good, or otherwise". As of 2001 it was one of only two English-language academic journals dedicated to NRMs and cults (the other being the Cultic Studies Journal). Jolyon Baraka Thomas described it as the "flagship journal" of NRM studies.

Topics covered in early issues included a debate on the concept of brainwashing between Benjamin Zablocki and David G. Bromley, coverage of the "Cult Wars" and academic neutrality, the relationship between violence and NRMs and law enforcement. It also provided an avenue for the publication of case studies on specific groups. Later, special issues were published focusing on a single theme, including topics like archaeology, food, Marian apparitions, and the legacy of Jonestown as they related to NRMs; other issues include shorter "Perspective Essays" not always based on empirical research. In the 2010s, its coverage began to cover more topics outside the North American context.

It was initially published semi-annually, changing to tri-annually in 2003, and then quarterly in 2005. It was initially owned by the co-general editors, before ownership was passed to the Association for the Academic Studies of New Religions. As of 2002 (volume 6), it was published by the University of California Press. In 2024 it moved to the University of Pennsylvania Press. The journal is associated with the AAR Program Unit, which holds conferences; much of the journal's content is sourced from the unit's conference papers.

== Abstracting and indexing ==
The journal is abstracted and indexed in:

- Arts and Humanities Citation Index
- ATLA Religion Database
- EBSCO databases
- International Bibliography of Periodical Literature
- Modern Language Association Database
- Scopus
