= John R. Hall (sociologist) =

American sociologist (born 1946)

- Born: John Ross Hall; 1946 (age 79–80); Louisville, Kentucky, U.S.

Academic background
- Education: University of Washington (PhD)

Academic work
- Discipline: Sociologist
- Institutions: University of California, Davis
- Notable works: Gone from the Promised Land, Apocalypse Observed

John Ross Hall (born 1946) is an American sociologist of religion, author, and research professor of sociology at the University of California, Davis. He received a PhD from the University of Washington in 1975. He was previously an associate professor at the University of Missouri-Columbia. Hall has authored and edited several books on religion and sociology; he is most well known for his studies of the Jonestown mass suicide, including his 1987 book, Gone from the Promised Land.

Other books written by Hall include Apocalypse Observed (2000), Sociology On Culture (2003) and Apocalypse: From Antiquity to the Empire of Modernity (2009). He also edited several books, including Paul Pascon's 1986 book Capitalism and Agriculture in the Haouz of Marrakesh and Reworking Class (1997).

== Early life and education ==
John Ross Hall was born in 1946. He is from Louisville, Kentucky, and attended Atherton High School; in his youth, he played in a rock band called The Falcons. He was raised in a Presbyterian family. He attended Yale College, studying sociology, and graduated from that institution with a Bachelor of Arts degree in 1968. He went on to undertake his graduate studies at the University of Washington, graduating from that institution with a PhD in 1975.

== Career ==
From 1976, he was an assistant professor of sociology at the University of Missouri-Columbia; he became an associate professor in 1982. He left that institution in 1989. became a professor at the sociology department of the University of California, Davis in 1989, holding that position until 2013, when he became a distinguished professor. He became a research professor at that institution in 2015; since 2017, he is also a research professor at the University of California, Santa Cruz. From 1998 to 2004 he was the director of the Center for History, Society, and Culture at UC Davis.

== Works ==
Hall has authored several books. His first book, The Ways Out: Utopian Communal Groups in an Age of Babylon, was published in 1978, developing from Hall's interest in the counterculture communities of the time. The same year, the Jonestown mass suicide occurred. Hall wrote an article on it, and became frustrated by much of the developing literature on the subject, which struck him as superficial looks into the subject. The next year, he traveled to Guyana to investigate himself.

Hall interviewed several former members of the Peoples Temple who had escaped or missed the mass suicide. This research culminated in his book Gone from the Promised Land, published in 1987. In the book, he interprets the events of the mass suicide and attempts to connect Jonestown to American society at large. It was published in 1987 by Transaction Books. The book took him five years to research. After publishing the book, Hall donated his collection of supporting research materials to the California Historical Society, where it formed the John R. Hall Research Materials collection. He has since written several other articles and book chapters on Jonestown. Writing in 2006, scholar Rebecca Moore wrote that Gone from the Promised Land "provides the most accurate, complete, and factual discussion of Peoples Temple of any account in print".

His other authored books include Cultures of Inquiry: From Epistemology to Discourse in Sociohistorical Research, and Apocalypse: From Antiquity to the Empire of Modernity. He co-authored Apocalypse Observed, a 2000 volume on apocalyptic religious groups, including Jonestown, with Philip D. Schuyler and Sylvaine Trinh. Hall primarily authored it with the co-authors assisting on two chapters. He coauthored Sociology On Culture with Mary Jo Neitz and Marshall Battani in 2003. Hall also edited several books. He edited Paul Pascon's 1986 book Capitalism and Agriculture in the Haouz of Marrakesh, also authoring the introduction. In 1997, he edited Reworking Class, a collection of essays on sociological class analysis.

== Bibliography ==
=== Authored ===
- —— (1978). The Ways Out: Utopian Communal Groups in an Age of Babylon. London: Routledge & K. Paul. ISBN 0-7100-8807-8.
- —— (1987). Gone from the Promised Land: Jonestown in American Cultural History. New Brunswick: Transaction Books. ISBN 0-88738-124-3.
- ——; Neitz, Mary Jo (1993). Culture: Sociological Perspectives. Englewood Cliffs: Prentice Hall. ISBN 0-13-816471-1.
- —— (1999). Cultures of Inquiry: From Epistemology to Discourse in Sociohistorical Research. Cambridge University Press. ISBN 0-521-64220-5.
- ——; Schuyler, Philip D.; Trinh, Sylvaine (2000). Apocalypse Observed: Religious Movements and Violence in North America, Europe, and Japan. New York: Routledge. ISBN 0-203-97766-1.
- ——; Neitz, Mary Jo; Battani, Marshall (2003). Sociology On Culture. London: Routledge. ISBN 0-415-28484-8.
- —— (2009). Apocalypse: From Antiquity to the Empire of Modernity. Cambridge: Polity. ISBN 978-0-7456-4509-4.

=== Edited ===
- Pascon, Paul (1986). —— (ed.). Capitalism and Agriculture in the Haouz of Marrakesh. London: KPI. ISBN 0-7103-0189-8.
- ——, ed. (1997). Reworking Class. Ithaca: Cornell University Press. ISBN 0-8014-3242-1.
- ——, ed. (2003). Intersections: Readings in Sociology. Boston: Pearson Custom Publishing. ISBN 978-0-536-77393-7.
- ——; Stimson, Blake; Becker, Lisa Tamiris, eds. (2005). Visual Worlds. London: Routledge. ISBN 978-0-415-36212-2.
- ——; Grindstaff, Laura; Lo, Ming-Cheng M., eds. (2010). Routledge Handbook of Cultural Sociology (2nd ed.). London: Routledge. ISBN 978-1-351-97409-7.
  - Grindstaff, Laura; Lo, Ming-Cheng M.; ——, eds. (2019). Routledge Handbook of Cultural Sociology (2nd ed.). London: Routledge. ISBN 978-1-351-97409-7.
