= Jeanne Halgren Kilde =

American academic

Jeanne Halgren Kilde is an American academic who serves as the director of the interdisciplinary Religious Studies Program at the University of Minnesota. Her research centers on religion and, most notably, religious architecture. She previously served on the faculties of Macalester College, Cleveland State University, the University of Notre Dame, and St. Francis University.

== Thought ==
Rather than seeing church architecture as being passively shaped by religion, Kilde views architecture as a force that exerts profound influence on religion. As one reviewer writes, church architecture is "Neither mere witnesses to transformations of religious thought nor simple backgrounds for religious practice, church buildings are, in Kilde's view, dynamic participants in religious change and goldmines of information on Christianity itself." Kilde proposes that the central purposes of church architecture are related to three specific kinds of power: divine power (theology), personal power (the perceived relationship between the individual and God), and social power (the whole host of human relationships within church settings). Ultimately, these three modalities of power become reified in church architecture.

Beyond her work with architecture, Kilde has published widely on a variety of subjects including the American evangelical movement, women in religious contexts, apocalypse, and the Left Behind series.

== Reception ==
Kilde's work has been well-received within the academic press. The Journal of Religion reported that "Kilde's careful and thorough research in published and unpublished congregational, denomnational, and architectural records successfully engages architectural history, religious studies, and social and cultural history." The Journal of the Society of Architectural Historians called Kilde's work the "Rosetta stone for an undervalued genre of American ecclesiastical architecture." The Religious Studies Review writes that Kilde's research "synthesizes, and enriches the narrative of both American religious history and American architectural history, which will enlighten professional and amateur scholars alike."

== Education ==
Kilde received her B.A. and M.A. degrees in English from the University of Wisconsin-Eau Claire in 1979 and 1982, respectively, and in 1991 received her Ph.D. in American studies from the University of Minnesota.

== Books ==
- Sacred Power, Sacred Space: An Introduction to Christian Architecture
- Rapture, Revelation and the End Times: Exploring the Left Behind Series
- When Church Became Theatre: The Transformation of Evangelical Architecture and Worship in Nineteenth-Century America

== Sources ==
- oup.com
- tc.umn.edu
- religiousstudies.umn.edu
- macmillan.com
- historycooperative.org
