= Nathalie Luca =

French research director

Nathalie Luca (born 1966) is a French research director at the French National Centre for Scientific Research (CNRS), an anthropologist and a sociologist of religions. She is director of the Center for Studies on Social Sciences of the Religious (CéSor) at the School for Advanced Studies in the Social Sciences (EHESS). She was co-editor-in-chief of the French review Archives de sciences sociales des religions.

She was a member of the French government agency monitoring and combatting cultic deviances MIVILUDES from March 2003 to November 2005. She resigned on the ground that she refused to participate in a predictable hardening of policy of this organization.

She wrote many books on groups she defined as "cults" and is regularly interviewed in the media, and by anti-cult organizations on this issue. She said she is not in favour of the establishment of a list of cults.

== Bibliography ==
- (in French) Le salut par le foot - Une ethnologue chez un messie coréen, Labor et Fides, 1997.
- (in French) With Frédéric Lenoir, Sectes, mensonges et idéaux, Bayard editions, Paris, 1998.
- (in French) "Sectes, Églises et nouveaux mouvements religieux", in L'enseignement du fait religieux, 5, 6 and 7 November 2002.
- (in French) Les sectes, Que sais-je ?, Presses Universitaires de France, Paris, 2004. Third edition : 2016.
- "Is There a Unique French Plicy of Cults? A European Perspective, in Regulating Religion: Case Studies from Around the Globe, James T. Richardson, Kluwer Academic/Plenum Publishers, New York 2004, p. 53-72.
- (in French) Individus et pouvoirs face aux sectes, Armand Colin, coll. « Sociétales », 2008.
- (in French) "Les «sectes» : une entrave à la citoyenneté ? Politiques européennes et états-uniennes", in Pluralisme religieux et citoyenneté, Micheline Milot, Philippe Portier, Jean-Paul Willaime, Presses universitaires de Rennes, Rennes, 2010, p. 123-136.
- (in French) Quelles régulations pour les nouveaux mouvements religieux et les dérives sectaires dans l’Union européenne ?, PU Aix-Marseille, coll. « Droit et religions », 2011.
- (in French) Y croire et en rêver. Réussir dans le marketing relationnel de multiniveaux, L'Harmattan, Paris, coll. « Religions en questions », 2012.
- (in French) With Jean-Philippe Bouilloud, Croyance et persuasion, Erès éditions, Toulouse, coll. « Nouvelle Revue de Psychosociologie », 16, 2013.
