= Peoples Temple =

American cult movement (1954–1978)

- Logo
- Classification: Christian new religious movement Utopian/social change church movement
- Orientation: Eclectic Pentecostal with Progressive Christian socialist and communist elements / Theosophical / New Thought
- Polity: Semi-congregationalist
- Leader: Jim Jones (1955–78)
- Region: Defunct from 1978, formerly present in: United States; Indiana; California; Guyana; Jonestown
- Founder: Jim Jones
- Origin: 1955; Indianapolis, Indiana, U.S.
- Defunct: December 4, 1978
- Congregations: 7 in California (prior moving to Guyana)
- Members: 3,000–5,000 (over 20,000 claimed but not substantiated)

The Peoples Temple of the Disciples of Christ, originally Peoples Temple Full Gospel Church and commonly shortened to Peoples Temple, was an American new religious movement that existed between 1955 and 1978 and was affiliated with the Christian Church (Disciples of Christ). Founded by Jim Jones in Indianapolis, Indiana, the Peoples Temple spread a message that combined elements of Christianity with communist and socialist ideology, with an emphasis on racial equality. After Jones moved the group to California in the 1960s and established several locations throughout the state, including its headquarters in San Francisco, the Temple forged ties with many left-wing political figures and claimed to have 20,000 members (though 3,000–5,000 is more likely).

The Temple is best known for the events of November 18, 1978, in Guyana, when 909 people died in a mass suicide and mass murder at its remote settlement, named "Jonestown", as well as the murders of U.S. Congressman Leo Ryan and members of his visiting delegation at the nearby Port Kaituma airstrip. The incident at Jonestown resulted in the greatest single loss of American civilian life in a deliberate act prior to the terrorist attacks of September 11, 2001. Because of the killings in Guyana, the Temple is regarded by scholars and by popular view as a destructive cult.

== Before California ==
=== Indiana formation ===
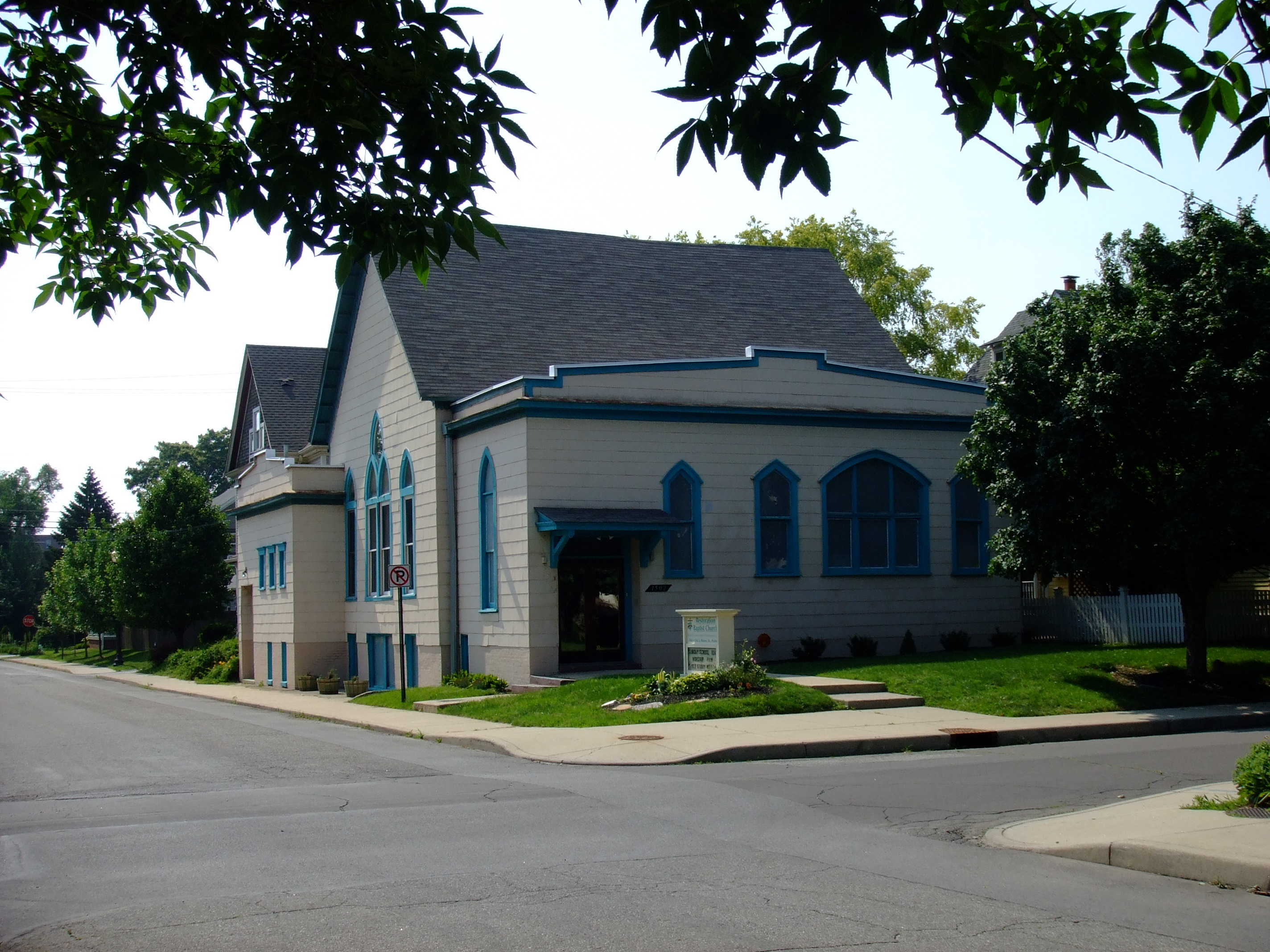
Jim Jones's first church in Indianapolis, Indiana

Before he founded his church, Jim Jones had become interested in communism and frustrated by the targeting of communists in the U.S. during the Red Scare. This, among other things, provided a clerical inspiration for Jones; as he himself described it in a biographical recording:

I decided, how can I demonstrate my Marxism? The thought was, infiltrate the church. So I consciously made a decision to look into that prospect.

Although Jones feared that he would end up being the victim of a backlash for being a communist, he was surprised when a Methodist superintendent helped him enter the church, despite his knowledge that Jones was a communist. In 1952, Jones became a student pastor in Sommerset Southside Methodist Church in Indianapolis, Indiana, but left that church because it barred him from integrating African Americans into his congregation. In 1954, Jones founded his own church in a rented space in Indianapolis, naming it the Community Unity Church.

Jones had previously observed a faith healing service at the Seventh Day Baptist Church, which led him to conclude that such healings could attract people, and generate income, which he could use to accomplish his social goals. Jones and the Temple's members knowingly faked healings because they found that the healings increased people's faith and generated financial resources which they could use to help the poor and finance the church. These "healings" involved the use of chicken livers and other animal tissue, which Jones (and confederate Temple members) claimed were cancerous tissues which had been removed from the bodies of the people who had been healed.

In 1955, Jones bought his first church building, located in a racially mixed Indianapolis neighborhood. He first named his church Wings of Deliverance, and later that year, he renamed it the Peoples Temple Full Gospel Church, the first time he used the phrase "Peoples Temple". Jones's healings and purported clairvoyant revelations attracted spiritualists.

=== Latter Rain Movement ===
Jones began closely associating with the Independent Assemblies of God (IAoG), an international group of churches who embraced the Latter Rain movement. The IAoG had few requirements for ordaining ministers and were accepting of divine healing practices. In June 1955, Jones held his first joint meetings with William Branham, a healing evangelist and Pentecostal leader in the global Healing Revival.

In 1956, Jones was ordained as an IAoG minister by Joseph Mattsson-Boze, a leader in the Latter Rain movement and the IAoG. Jones quickly rose to prominence in the group. Working with the IAoG, Jones organized and hosted a healing convention to take place from June 11 to June 15, 1956, in Indianapolis's Cadle Tabernacle. Needing a well-known figure to draw crowds, he arranged to share the pulpit again with Reverend Branham.

Branham was known to tell supplicants their name, address, and why they came for prayer, before pronouncing them healed. Jones was intrigued by Branham's methods and began performing the same feats. Jones and Branham's meetings were very successful and attracted an audience of 11,000 at their first joint campaign. At the convention, Branham issued a prophetic endorsement of Jones and his ministry, saying that God used the convention to send forth a new great ministry.

Many attendees in the campaign believed Jones's performance indicated that he possessed a supernatural gift, and coupled with Branham's endorsement, it led to rapid growth of Peoples Temple. Jones was particularly effective at recruitment among the African American attendees at the conventions. According to a newspaper report, regular attendance at Peoples Temple swelled to 1,000 thanks to the publicity Branham provided to Jones and Peoples Temple.

Following the convention, Jones renamed his church the "Peoples Temple Christian Church Full Gospel" to associate it with Full Gospel Pentecostalism; the name was later shortened to the Peoples Temple. Jones participated in a series of multi-state revival campaigns with Branham and Mattsson-Boze in the second half of the 1950s, making multiple joint appearances with them. Jones claimed to be a follower and promoter of Branham's "Message" during the period. Peoples Temple hosted a second international Pentecostal convention in 1957 which was again headlined by Branham. Through the conventions and with the support of Branham and Mattsson-Boze, Jones secured connections throughout the Latter Rain movement.

=== Indianapolis expansion ===
Jones used the convention meetings with other Pentecostal speakers to gain wide publicity, and Jim Jones continued to disguise the fact that he was using religion to further his political ideology. Those conventions drew as many as 11,000 attendees, as James Warren Jones and the other preachers conducted "healings" and impressed attendees by revealing private information—usually addresses, phone numbers, or Social Security numbers, which private detectives could easily discover beforehand. Jones and Temple members also drove through various cities in Indiana and Ohio on recruiting and fundraising efforts.

The Temple stressed egalitarian ideals, asking members to attend in casual clothes so poor members would not feel out of place, and providing shelter for the needy. While the Temple had increased its African-American membership from 15% to nearly 50%, in order to attempt further gains the Temple hired African-American preacher Archie Ijames (who had earlier given up organized religion). Pastor Ijames was one of the first to commit to Jones's socialist collective program. In 1959, the church joined the Christian Church (Disciples of Christ), and was renamed the Peoples Temple Christian Church Full Gospel. This affiliation was a successful attempt to both raise the dwindling membership and restore the reputation of the organization.

In February 1960, the Temple opened a soup kitchen for the poor and expanded their social services to include rent assistance, job placement services, free canned goods, clothing, and coal for winter heating. Jones and his wife Marceline helped to increase the Temple's soup kitchen service to an average of about 2,800 meals per month. The Temple's public profile was further elevated when Jones was appointed to the Indianapolis Human Rights Commission. He engaged in public attempts to integrate businesses and was the subject of much local media coverage.

=== Changes and "religious communalism" ===
Jones had read extensively about Father Divine, the founder of the International Peace Mission movement. Jones and members of the Temple visited Divine several times, while Jones studied his writings and tape recordings of his sermons. The Temple printed Divine's texts for its members and began to preach that members should abstain from sex and only adopt children.

In 1959, Jones tested the new fiery rhetorical style that Divine had used in a sermon. His speech captivated members with lulls and crescendos, as Jones challenged individual members in front of the group. The speech also marked the beginning of the Temple's underlying "us versus them" message. Jones carefully wove in that the Temple's home for senior citizens was established on the basis "From each according to his ability, to each according to his need", quoting Karl Marx's Critique of the Gotha Program. He did so knowing that his Christian audience would recognize the similarities with text from the Acts of the Apostles (4:34–35) which stated: "distribution was made to each as any had need." Jones would repeatedly cite that passage to paint Jesus as a communist, while at the same time attacking much of the text of the Bible.

The Temple began tightening control over its organization, asking more of its members than did other churches. It required that members spend Thanksgiving and Christmas with its Temple "family" rather than with blood relatives, the beginning of a process to wean members from outside contact and redirect their lives toward a total commitment to the Temple and its goals. Jones began to offer a deal towards a socialist collective, which he called "religious communalism", in which members would donate their material possessions to the Temple in exchange for the Temple meeting all those members' needs. Pastor James was one of the first to commit.

The Temple had little luck converting most Midwesterners to their ideals. Admiring the 1959 Cuban Revolution, Jones traveled to the island nation in 1960 in an unsuccessful attempt to persuade poor black Cubans to move to his congregation in Indiana. The Temple's religious message transitioned during this period, to one treading between atheism and the subtle notion that Jones was a Christ-like figure. While Temple aides complained privately, Jones said that the new message was needed to foster members' dedication to the Temple's larger goals. He maintained such implications until the mid-to-late 1970s.

In 1961, Jones claimed he had had a vision in which Indianapolis and Chicago were destroyed in a nuclear attack, convincing aides that the Temple needed to look for a new location. A 1962 Esquire magazine article listed the nine safest places to be in a nuclear war, with Belo Horizonte, Brazil, topping the list because of its location and atmospheric conditions. Jones traveled through Brazil from 1962 through early 1963. He requested money from the Temple while in Rio de Janeiro, but the Temple lacked adequate funds for such a request because of shrinking finances in Jones's absence. Jones sent a preacher that had become a follower in Brazil back to Indiana to help stabilize the Temple. Jones returned to Indiana in 1963.

== In California ==
=== Moving Peoples Temple ===
Some of the Peoples Temple's locations in California

Jones returned from Brazil in December 1963 to find Peoples Temple bitterly divided. Financial issues and a much smaller congregation forced Jones to sell the Peoples Temple church building and relocate to a smaller building nearby. To raise money, Jones briefly returned to the revival circuit, traveling and holding healing campaigns. After dealing with the issues at Peoples Temple, and possibly in part to distract from them, he told his Indiana congregation that the world would be engulfed by nuclear war on July 15, 1967, leading to a new socialist Eden on Earth, and that the Temple must move to Northern California for safety.

With Jones's return, the majority of his congregation gradually returned to Peoples Temple, improving their financial situation. During 1964 Jones made multiple trips to California to locate a suitable location to relocate. In July 1965, Jones and his followers began moving to their new location in Redwood Valley, California, near the city of Ukiah. Jones's assistant pastor, Russell Winberg, strongly resisted Jones's efforts to move the congregation and warned members of Peoples Temple that Jones was abandoning Christianity.

Winberg took over leadership of the Indianapolis church when Jones departed. About 140 of Jones's most loyal followers made the move to California, while the rest remained behind with Winberg.

In California, Jones was able to use his education degree from Butler University to secure a job as a history and government teacher at an adult education school in Ukiah. Jones used his position to recruit for Peoples Temple, teaching his students the benefits of Marxism and lecturing on religion. Jones planted loyal members of Peoples Temple in the classes to help him with recruitment. His efforts were successful, and Jones recruited 50 new members to Peoples Temple in the first few months. In 1967, Jones's followers persuaded another 75 members of the Indianapolis congregation to move to California.

In 1968, the Peoples Temple's California location was admitted to the Disciples of Christ. Jones began to use the denominational connection to promote Peoples Temple as part of the 1.5 million member denomination. He played up famous members of the Disciples, including Lyndon Johnson and J. Edgar Hoover, and misrepresented the nature of his position in the denomination. By 1969, Jones increased the membership in Peoples Temple in California to 300.

=== Apostolic Socialism ===
Jones developed a theology that was significantly influenced by the teachings of the Latter Rain movement, William Branham, Father Divine, and infused with Jones's personal communist worldview. Jones referred to his belief as "Apostolic Socialism". Following the relocation of Peoples Temple to California, Jones began to gradually introduce the concepts to his followers. According to religious studies professor Catherine Wessinger, Jones always spoke of the Social Gospel's virtues, but chose to conceal that his gospel was communist until he began to do so in sermons at the Temple in the late 1960s.

Jones taught that "those who remained drugged with the opiate of religion had to be brought to enlightenment", which he defined as socialism. Jones asserted that traditional Christianity had an incorrect view of God. By the early 1970s, Jones began deriding traditional Christianity as "fly away religion", rejecting the Bible as being a tool to oppress women and non-whites. Jones referred to traditional Christianity's view of God as a "Sky God" who was "no God at all". Instead, Jones claimed to be following the true God who created all things.

Jones taught that ultimate reality was called the "Divine Principle", and this principle was the true God. Jones equated the principle with love, and he equated love with socialism. Jones asserted he was a savior sent by the true God, to rescue humanity from their sufferings. Jones insisted that accepting the "Divine Principle" was equivalent to being "crucified with Christ".

Jones increasingly promoted the idea of his own divinity, going so far as to tell his congregation that "I am come as God Socialist." Jones carefully avoided claiming divinity outside of Peoples Temple, but he expected to be acknowledged as god-like among his followers. Former Temple member Hue Fortson Jr. quoted him as saying:

What you need to believe in is what you can see.... If you see me as your friend, I'll be your friend. As you see me as your father, I'll be your father, for those of you that don't have a father.... If you see me as your savior, I'll be your savior. If you see me as your God, I'll be your God.

Further attacking traditional Christianity, Jones authored and circulated a tract entitled "The Letter Killeth", criticizing the King James Bible, and dismissing King James as a slave owner and a capitalist who was responsible for the corrupt translation of scripture. Jones claimed he was sent to share the true meaning of the gospel which had been hidden by corrupt leaders.

Jones rejected even the few required tenets of the Disciples of Christ denomination. Instead of implementing the sacraments as prescribed by the Disciples, Jones followed Father Divine's holy communion practices. Jones created his own baptismal formula, baptizing his converts "in the holy name of Socialism".

While in the United States, Jones remained fearful of the public discovering the full extent of his communist views. He believed that if the true nature of his views became widely known, he would quickly lose the support of political leaders and even face the possibility of Peoples Temple being ejected from the Disciples of Christ. Jones also feared losing the church's tax-exempt status and having to report his financial dealings to the Internal Revenue Service. Jones took care to always couch his socialist views in religious terms, such as "apostolic social justice". "Living the Acts of the Apostles" was his euphemism for living a communal lifestyle.

Jones frequently warned his followers of an imminent apocalyptic genocidal race war and nuclear war. He claimed that Nazi fascists and white supremacists would put people of color into concentration camps. Jones said he was a messiah sent to save people by giving them a place of refuge in his church. Drawing on a prophecy in the Book of Revelation, he taught that American capitalist culture was irredeemable "Babylon". Explaining the nature of sin, Jones stated, "If you're born in capitalist America, racist America, fascist America, then you're born in sin. But if you're born in socialism, you're not born in sin." He taught his followers the only way to escape the supposed imminent catastrophe was to accept his teachings, and that after the apocalypse was over, they would emerge to establish a perfect communist society.

Historians are divided over whether Jones actually believed his own teachings, or was just using them to manipulate people. Jeff Guinn said, "It is impossible to know whether Jones gradually came to think he was God's earthly vessel, or whether he came to that convenient conclusion" to enhance his authority over his followers. In a 1976 phone conversation with John Maher, Jones admitted to be an agnostic and an atheist. Marceline admitted in a 1977 New York Times interview that Jones was trying to promote Marxism in the U.S. by mobilizing people through religion, citing Mao Zedong as his inspiration: "Jim used religion to try to get some people out of the opiate of religion." She told the reporter that Jones had once slammed the Bible on the table yelling "I've got to destroy this paper idol!" Jones taught his followers that the ends justify the means and authorized them to achieve his vision by any means necessary. Outsiders would later point to this aspect of Jones's teachings to allege that he did not genuinely believe in his own teachings and that he was "morally bankrupt" and only manipulating religion and other elements of society "to achieve his own selfish ends".

=== Early reports of abuse ===
Jones began using illicit drugs after moving to California, which further heightened his paranoia. Jones increasingly used fear to control and manipulate his followers in California. Jones frequently warned his followers that there was an enemy seeking to destroy them. The identity of that enemy changed over time from the Ku Klux Klan, to Nazis, to redneck vigilantes, and finally the American government. He frequently prophesied that fires, car accidents, and death or injuries would come upon anyone unfaithful to him and his teachings. He constantly told his followers that they needed to be crusaders in promoting and fulfilling his beliefs.

Through his tactics, he successfully implemented a communal lifestyle among his followers that was directed by him and his lieutenants who were part of a committee called the Planning Commission. Jones, through the Planning Commission, began controlling all aspects of the lives of his followers. Members who joined Peoples Temple were required to turn over all their assets to the church in exchange for free room and board. Many members working outside of the Temple were also required to turn over all their income to be used for the benefit of the community. Jones directed groups of his followers to work on various projects to earn income for the People Temple and set up an agricultural operation in Redwood Valley to grow food. Jones organized large community outreach projects, taking his followers by bus to perform work community service across the region.

The first known cases of serious abuse in Peoples Temple arose in California as the Planning Commission carried out discipline against members who were not fulfilling Jones's vision or following the rules. Jones's control over the members of Peoples Temple extended to their sex lives and who could be married. Some members were coerced to get abortions. Jones began to require sexual favors from the wives of some members of the church. Jones also raped several male members of his congregation.

Members who rebelled against Jones's control were punished with reduced food rations, harsher work schedules, public ridicule and humiliations, and sometimes with physical violence. As the Temple's membership grew, Jones created a security group to ensure order among his followers and to ensure his own personal safety. The group purchased security squad cars and armed their guards with rifles and pistols.

=== Urban expansion ===
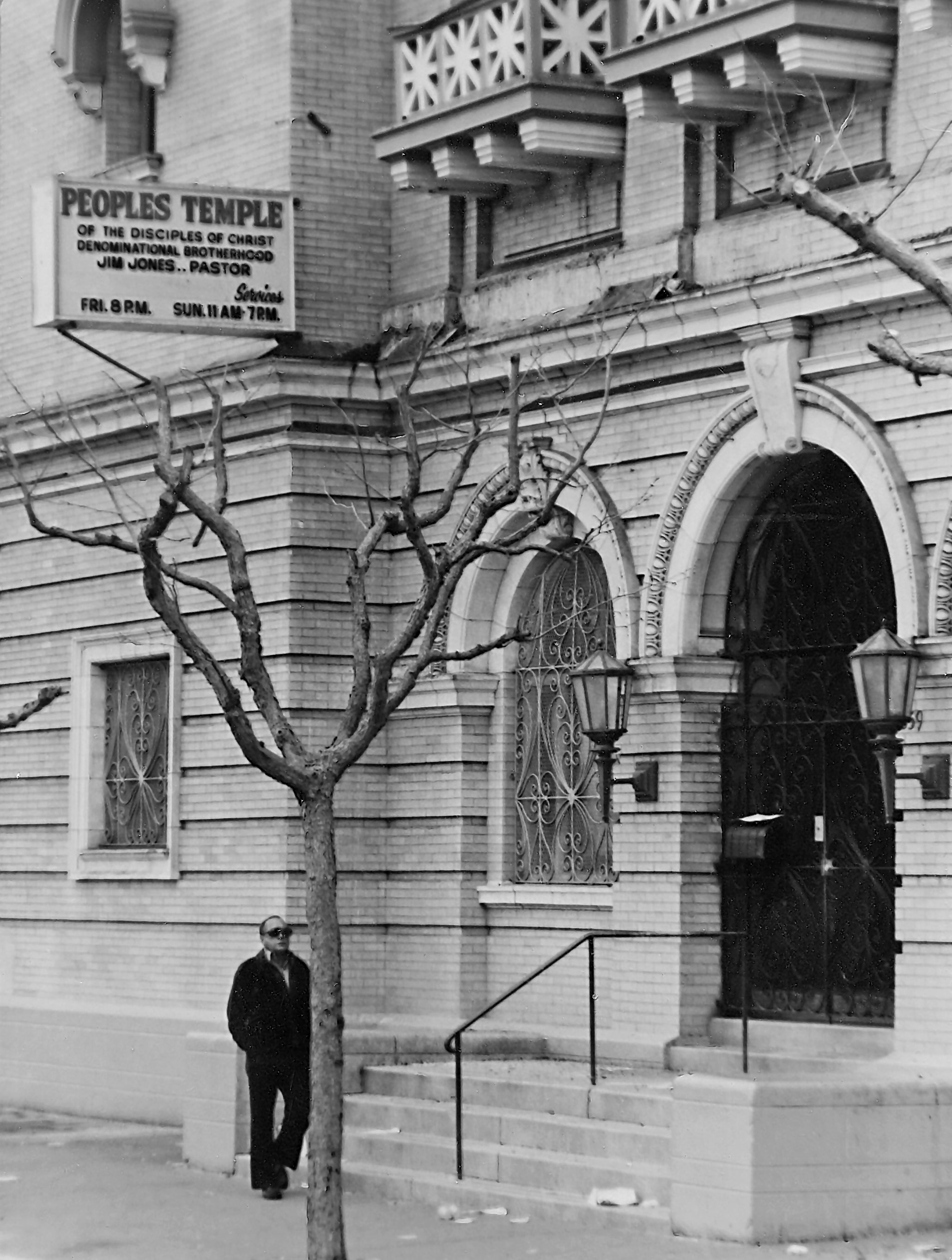
Peoples Temple headquarters, 1859 Geary Blvd., San Francisco, 1978

Because of limited expansion in the Redwood Valley-Ukiah area, it eventually seemed necessary to move the church's seat of power to an urban area. In 1970, the Temple began holding services in San Francisco and Los Angeles. It established permanent facilities in those cities in 1971 and 1972, respectively. In San Francisco, the Temple occupied a former Scottish Rite temple at 1859 Geary Boulevard in the Fillmore District. At the time, the Fillmore district was a majority Black neighborhood and a stronghold of Black culture on the West Coast. In Los Angeles, the Temple occupied the former building of the First Church of Christ, Scientist at 1366 S. Alvarado Street.

By 1972, the Temple called Redwood Valley the "mother church" of a "statewide political movement". From the start, the Los Angeles facility's primary purposes were to recruit members and to serve as a waystation for the Temple's weekly bus trips across California. The Temple set up permanent staff in Los Angeles and arranged bus trips there every other week. The substantial attendance and collections in Los Angeles helped support the Temple's inflated membership claims. The Los Angeles facility was larger than San Francisco's. Its central location at the corner of Alvarado and Hoover Streets permitted easy geographic access for a large black membership from Watts and Compton.

Recruiting drives in Los Angeles and San Francisco helped increase membership in the Temple from a few hundred to nearly 3,000 by the mid-1970s. Later, when the Temple's headquarters shifted from Redwood Valley to San Francisco, the Temple convinced many Los Angeles members to move north to its new headquarters.

=== Organizational structure ===
Although some descriptions of the Peoples Temple emphasize Jones's autocratic control over its operations, in reality, the Temple possessed a complex leadership structure with decision-making power unevenly dispersed among its members. Within that structure, Temple members were unwittingly and gradually subjected to sophisticated mind control and behavior modification techniques borrowed from post-revolutionary China and North Korea. The Temple tightly defined psychological boundaries that "enemies", such as "traitors" to the Temple, crossed at their own peril. While the secrecy and caution Jones demanded in recruiting led to decreased overall membership, they also helped him foster hero-worship of himself as the "ultimate socialist".

In the 1970s, the Temple established a more formal hierarchy for its socialistic model. At the top were the Temple's staff, a select group of predominantly college-educated white women that undertook the Temple's most sensitive missions. They necessarily acclimated themselves to an "ends justify the means" philosophy. The earliest member was Sandy Bradshaw, a socialist from Syracuse, New York. Others included Carolyn Layton, a communist since the age of 15 who had a child with Jones; Sharon Amos, who worked for the social services department; Patty Cartmell, Jones's secretary; and Teri Buford, a Navy brat turned pacifist. The group was often scorned as elitist within the egalitarian Temple organization and viewed as secret police.

The Temple's Planning Commission was its governing board. Membership quickly ballooned from 50 to over 100. During the week, members convened for meetings in various Redwood Valley locations, sometimes until dawn. The Planning Commission was responsible for the Temple's day-to-day operations, including key decision-making, financial and legal planning, and oversight. The Commission sat over various other committees, such as the Diversions Committee, which carried out tasks such as writing huge numbers of letters to politicians from fictional people mailed from various locations around the U.S., and the Mertles Committee, which undertook activities against defectors Al and Jeannie Mills.

A group of rank-and-file members, whom outsiders called the "troops", consisted of working-class members who were 70–80% black. They set up chairs for meetings, filled offering boxes, and did other tasks. Many of them were attracted to the Temple's quasi-socialist approach both because of the Temple's political education offers and because the Temple's highly passionate congregations still maintained the familiar forms of evangelical prayers and black gospels. Jones also surrounded himself with several dozen mostly white, privileged members in their twenties and thirties who had skills in law, accounting, nursing, teaching, music, and administration. This latter group carried out public relations, financial duties, and more mundane chores while bringing in good salaries from well-paying outside jobs.

=== Recruiting, faith healings, and fund raising ===
The Temple used ten to fifteen Greyhound-type bus cruisers to transport members up and down California freeways each week for recruitment and fundraising. Jones always rode in bus number seven, which contained armed guards and a special section lined with protective metal plates. He told members that the Temple would not bother scheduling a trip unless it could net $100,000, and the Temple's goal for annual net income from bus trips was $1 million.

Beginning in the 1970s, the bus caravan also traveled across the U.S. quarterly, including to Washington, D.C. In June 1973, Representative George Brown, Jr. entered a lengthy and laudatory description of the Temple into the Congressional Record. The Washington Post ran an August 18, 1973, editorial-page item stating that the 660 Temple visitors were the "hands down winners of anybody's tourists of the year award" after spending an hour cleaning up the Capitol grounds.

The Temple distributed pamphlets in cities along the route of these fundraising trips bragging of Jones's prowess at "spiritual healing" without mentioning the Temple's Marxist goals. Stops included large cities such as Houston, Detroit, and Cleveland. Temple members pretended to be locals and acted as shills in the various faked healings and "revelations". Local viewers did not realize they were in the minority in the audience. The weekly take from offerings and healing services was $15,000 to $25,000 in Los Angeles and $8,000 to $12,000 in San Francisco. There were smaller collections from trips around the "mother church" in Redwood Valley.

The Temple also set up Truth Enterprises, a direct mailing branch that sent out 30,000 to 50,000 mailers monthly to people who had attended Temple services or written to the Temple after listening to Temple radio programs. Donations were mailed in from all over the continental U.S., Hawaii, South America, and Europe. In addition to receiving donations, the Temple sold trinkets, such as pieces of Jones's robes, healing oil, Temple rings, key chains, and lockets. In peak periods, mailer revenue grossed $300 to $400 daily. This figure even surprised Jones.

Although Jones had earlier asked Temple members to destroy photos of him because he did not want members worshipping him as Catholics "worshiped plaster statues", Jeannie and Al Mills (who would later defect) convinced Jones to sell anointed and blessed photos to raise money. Jones worried that "they're gonna get me for mail fraud someday." In 1973, the Temple also formed Brotherhood Records, a subsidiary record label that produced music from the Temple's "large interracial youth choir and orchestra".

=== Size and scope ===
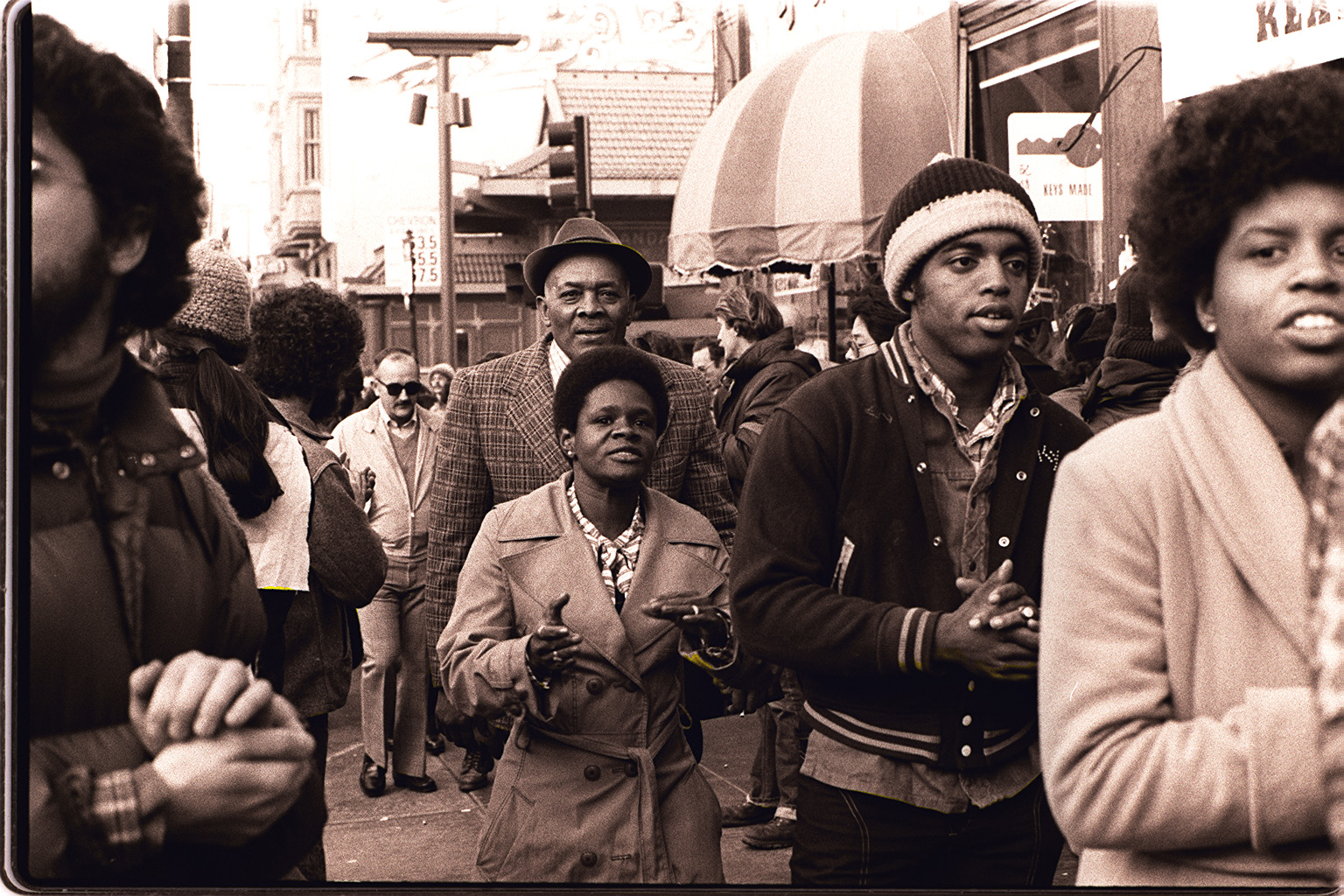
Peoples Temple members attend an anti-eviction rally at the International Hotel, San Francisco, in January 1977.

Despite exaggerated claims by the Temple of 20,000 or more members, one source claims its greatest actual registered membership was around 3,000. However, 5,000 individual membership card photos were located in Temple records after its dissolution. Regardless of its official membership, the Temple also regularly drew 3,000 people to its San Francisco services alone. Of particular interest to politicians was the Temple's ability to produce 2,000 people for campaign work or attendance in San Francisco on only six hours' notice.

By the mid-1970s, in addition to its locations in Redwood Valley, Los Angeles and San Francisco, the Temple had established satellite congregations in almost a dozen other California cities. Jones mentioned locations in San Francisco, Los Angeles, Ukiah, Bakersfield, Fresno, and Sacramento. The Temple also maintained a branch, college tuition program, and dormitory at Santa Rosa Junior College.

At the same time, Jones and his church earned a reputation for aiding the cities' poorest citizens, especially racial minorities, drug addicts, and the homeless. The Temple made strong connections to the California state welfare system. During the 1970s, the church owned and ran at least nine residential care homes for the elderly, six homes for foster children, and a state-licensed 40-acre (160,000 m^{2}) ranch for developmentally disabled persons. The Temple elite handled members' insurance claims and legal problems, effectively acting as a client-advocacy group. For these reasons, sociologist John R. Hall described the Temple as a "charismatic bureaucracy", oriented toward Jones as a charismatic leader, but functioning as a bureaucratic social service organization.

=== Kinsolving series ===
In 1972, the San Francisco Examiner and the Indianapolis Star ran the first four parts of a seven-part story on the Temple by Lester Kinsolving, its first public exposé. Kinsolving reported on several aspects of church dealings, its claims of healings, and Jones's ritual of throwing Bibles down in church, yelling, "This black book has held down you people for 2,000 years. It has no power." Temple members picketed the Examiner, harassed the paper's editor, and threatened both the Examiner and the Star with libel suits. Both papers canceled the series after the fourth installment. Shortly thereafter, Jones made grants to newspapers in California with the stated goal of supporting the First Amendment.

=== Defections ===
Some defections occurred, most especially in 1973, when eight young members – known as the "Gang of Eight" – defected together. Because the Gang of Eight were aware of threats to potential defectors, they suspected Jones would send a search party to look for them. Their fears proved correct: Jones employed multiple search parties, including one which scanned highways from a rented airplane. The Gang of Eight drove three trucks loaded with firearms toward Canada, avoiding U.S. Highway 101. Because they feared taking firearms over the U.S.-Canada border, the group traveled instead to the hills of Montana, where they wrote a long letter documenting their complaints.

Former Temple member Jeannie Mills later wrote that Jones called thirty members to his home and forebodingly declared that, in light of the mass defection, "in order to keep our apostolic socialism, we should all kill ourselves and leave a note saying that because of harassment, a socialist group cannot exist at this time." Jones became furious, waving a pistol at the Planning Commission and referring to the Gang of Eight as "Trotskyite defectors" and "Coca-Cola revolutionaries". While the Temple did not execute the suicide plan Jones described, it did conduct fake suicide rituals in the years that followed.

== San Francisco Temple ==
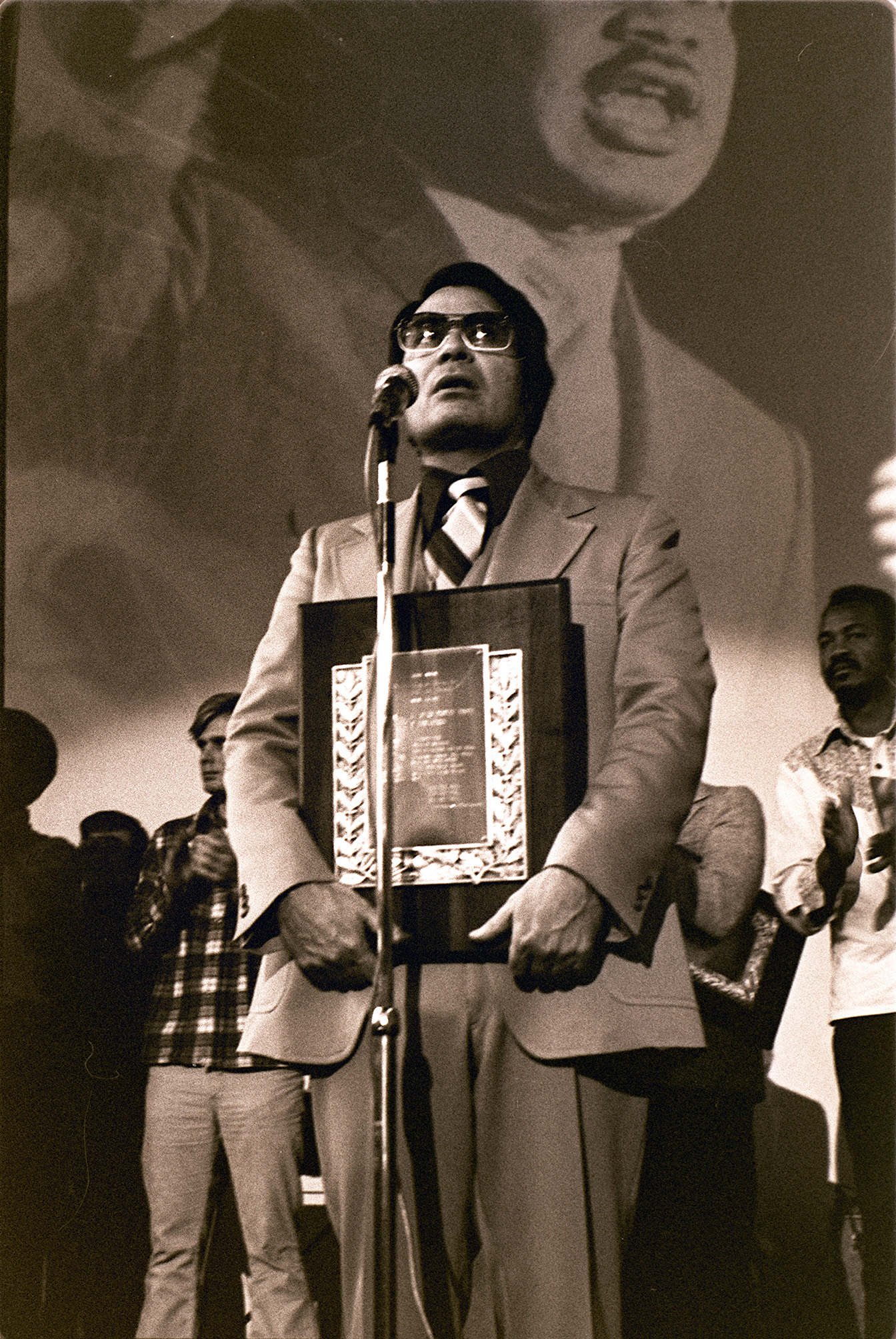
Rev. Jim Jones receives a Martin Luther King, Jr. Humanitarian award at Glide Memorial Church in San Francisco in January 1977.

The move to San Francisco permitted Jones to be more open with his true political and theological leanings. By spring 1976, Jones openly admitted even to outsiders that he was an atheist. Despite the Temple's fear that the Internal Revenue Service (IRS) was investigating its religious tax exemption, Marceline admitted to The New York Times in 1977 that her husband, taking inspiration from Mao Zedong, was trying to achieve social change by mobilizing people through religion. She admitted that, "Jim used religion to try to get some people out of the opiate of religion" and had slammed the Bible on the table yelling, "I've got to destroy this paper idol!"

With the move into San Francisco, the Temple more strenuously emphasized that its members live communally. It stressed physical discipline of children first, and then adults. The San Francisco Temple also carefully vetted newcomers through an extensive observation process.

The Temple distinguished itself from most new religious movements with its overtly political message. It combined those genuine political sympathies with the perception that it could help turn out large numbers of votes to gain the support of a number of prominent politicians. Jones made it known after he moved to San Francisco that he was interested in politics, and legal changes in the way San Francisco elections were held strengthened the power of neighborhood groups and civic organizations such as the Temple.

After the Temple's voter mobilization efforts proved instrumental in state Senate President George Moscone's run for mayor of San Francisco in 1975, he appointed Jones as Chairman of the San Francisco Housing Authority Commission. Jones and the Temple received the support of California political figures such as Moscone, Governor Jerry Brown, Congressman Mervyn Dymally, state Assembly Speaker Willie Brown, Assemblyman Art Agnos, and Supervisor Harvey Milk. Willie Brown visited the Temple numerous times and spoke publicly in support of Jones, even after investigations and suspicions of cult activity. Jones and Moscone met privately with Presidential nominee Jimmy Carter's then-running mate, U.S. Senator Walter Mondale in San Francisco days before the 1976 presidential election. Jones also met First Lady Rosalynn Carter on multiple occasions, including a private dinner, and corresponded with her in letters.

Jones used his position at the Housing Authority to lead the fight against the eviction of tenants from San Francisco's International Hotel. The Temple further forged an alliance with San Francisco's Black community newspaper, the Sun Reporter publisher Dr. Carlton Goodlett and it received frequent favorable mentions in that paper. It also received frequent favorable coverage from San Francisco Chronicle columnist Herb Caen and other local newspaper and television reporters.

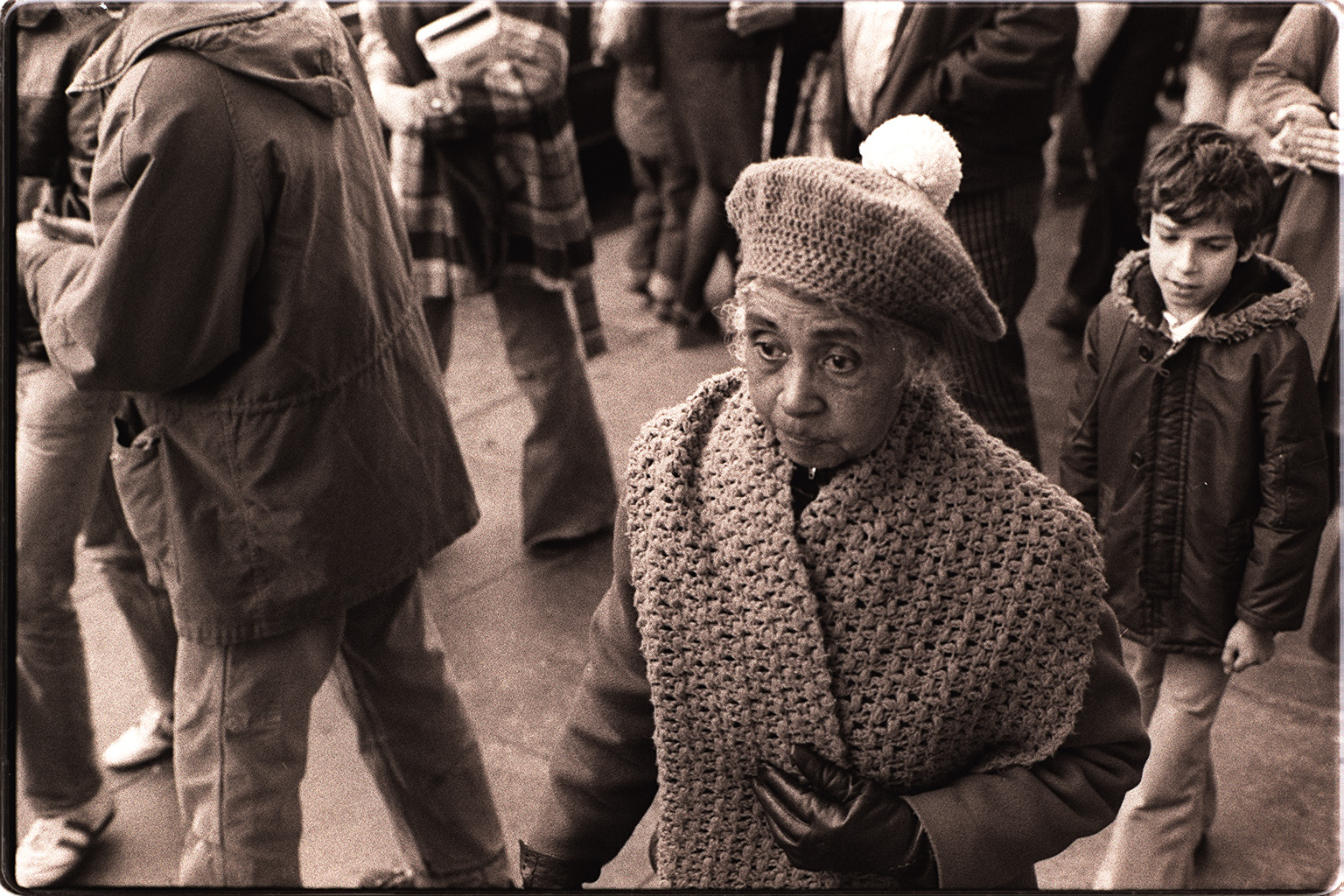
Peoples Temple members included the elderly as well as youth. Hazel Dashiell, with Mark Fields at an anti-eviction rally in San Francisco's Chinatown, 1977.

However, the Temple aroused police suspicion after Jones praised the Symbionese Liberation Army, a radical Bay Area group, and the SLA's leaders attended San Francisco Temple meetings. Further suspicions were raised after the defection of Joyce Shaw and the mysterious death soon after of her husband, Bob Houston.

In 1974 a fire broke out at Peoples Temple's San Francisco location. Without evidence Jones speculated that members of the Nation of Islam may have started the fire. Jones sent several of his followers to a nearby mosque to issue a warning to their group. This began a period of heightened tensions between Peoples Temple and the Nation of Islam. Gradually, Jones worked to improve relations with the Nation of Islam, culminating a joint "Spiritual Jubilee" rally held at the Los Angeles Convention Center in May 1976. He used the event to garner positive publicity, and the joint rally was attended by many of his closest political acquaintances. At the rally, Jones called for peace and unity saying, "if the Peoples Temple and the Nation of Islam can get together, anyone can." Jones ended by pledging support to the Muslim community and declared his desire for Wallace Muhammad to run for President of the United States.

While the Temple forged media alliances, the move to San Francisco also opened the group to media scrutiny. When Jones and hundreds of Temple members moved to the Temple's Guyana settlement following media investigations, Mayor Moscone issued a press release stating that his office would not investigate the Temple. During this time, Milk spoke at Temple political rallies and wrote a letter to President Jimmy Carter after the investigations began, in which he accused Timothy Stoen, who by that point had defected from the Temple and was attempting to extricate relatives from Guyana, of telling "bold-faced lies".

== Mass murder/suicide at Jonestown, Guyana ==
The Peoples Temple Agricultural Project ("Jonestown", Guyana)

In 1974, the Peoples Temple signed a lease to rent land in Guyana. The community which was established on this piece of property was named the Peoples Temple Agricultural Project, informally dubbed "Jonestown". The settlement had as few as fifty residents in early 1977.

Jones saw Jonestown as both a "socialist paradise" and a "sanctuary" from media scrutiny that had started with the Kinsolving articles. Former Temple member Tim Carter said the Temple moved to Jonestown because "in '74, what we saw in the United States was creeping fascism." Carter explained, "It was apparent that corporations, or the multinationals, were getting much larger, their influence was growing within the government, and the United States is a racist place." He said the Temple concluded that Guyana was "a place in a black country where our black members could live in peace", "it was a socialist government" and it was "the only English-speaking country in South America."

Increasing media scrutiny based on allegations by former members placed further pressure on Jones, especially after a 1977 article by Marshall Kilduff in New West magazine. Just before publication of the New West piece, editor Rosalie Wright telephoned Jones to read him the article. Wright explained that she was only doing so before publication because of "all the support letters we received on your behalf, from the Governor of California [Jerry Brown]" and others.

While still on the phone listening to the allegations contained in the article, Jones wrote a note to Temple members in the room with him that said, "We leave tonight. Notify Georgetown (Guyana)." After Jones left for Guyana, he encouraged Temple members to follow him there. The population grew to about a thousand people by late 1978. Those who moved there were promised a tropical paradise free from the supposed wickedness of the outside world.

On November 17, 1978, Representative Leo Ryan, who was investigating claims of abuse within the Temple, visited Jonestown. During his visit, a number of Temple members expressed a desire to leave with him, and, on November 18, some accompanied Ryan to the local airstrip at Port Kaituma. There they were intercepted by Temple security guards who opened fire on the group, killing Ryan, three journalists, and one of the defectors as well as injuring nine others, including Ryan's aide, Jackie Speier. A few seconds of gunfire from the incident were captured on video by NBC cameraman Bob Brown, one of the journalists killed in the attack. Though she was shot five times, including suffering a massive leg wound, Speier survived and won a seat in Congress in 2008, serving until she declined to run for reelection in 2022. That evening, in Jonestown, Jones ordered his congregation to drink a concoction of cyanide-laced, grape-flavored Flavor Aid. In all, 918 people died, including 276 children. This includes four that died at the Temple headquarters that night in the Guyanese capital of Georgetown. Some members resisted committing "revolutionary suicide," and were injected with fatal doses of cyanide, as were infants, and others survived by fleeing through the jungle. Jones himself, as well as his personal aide Annie Moore, died of (likely) self-inflicted gunshot wounds. It was the greatest single loss of American civilian life in a deliberate act until the events of September 11, 2001.

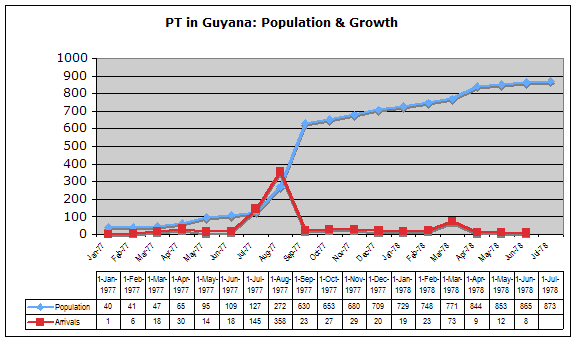
Jonestown arrivals and population

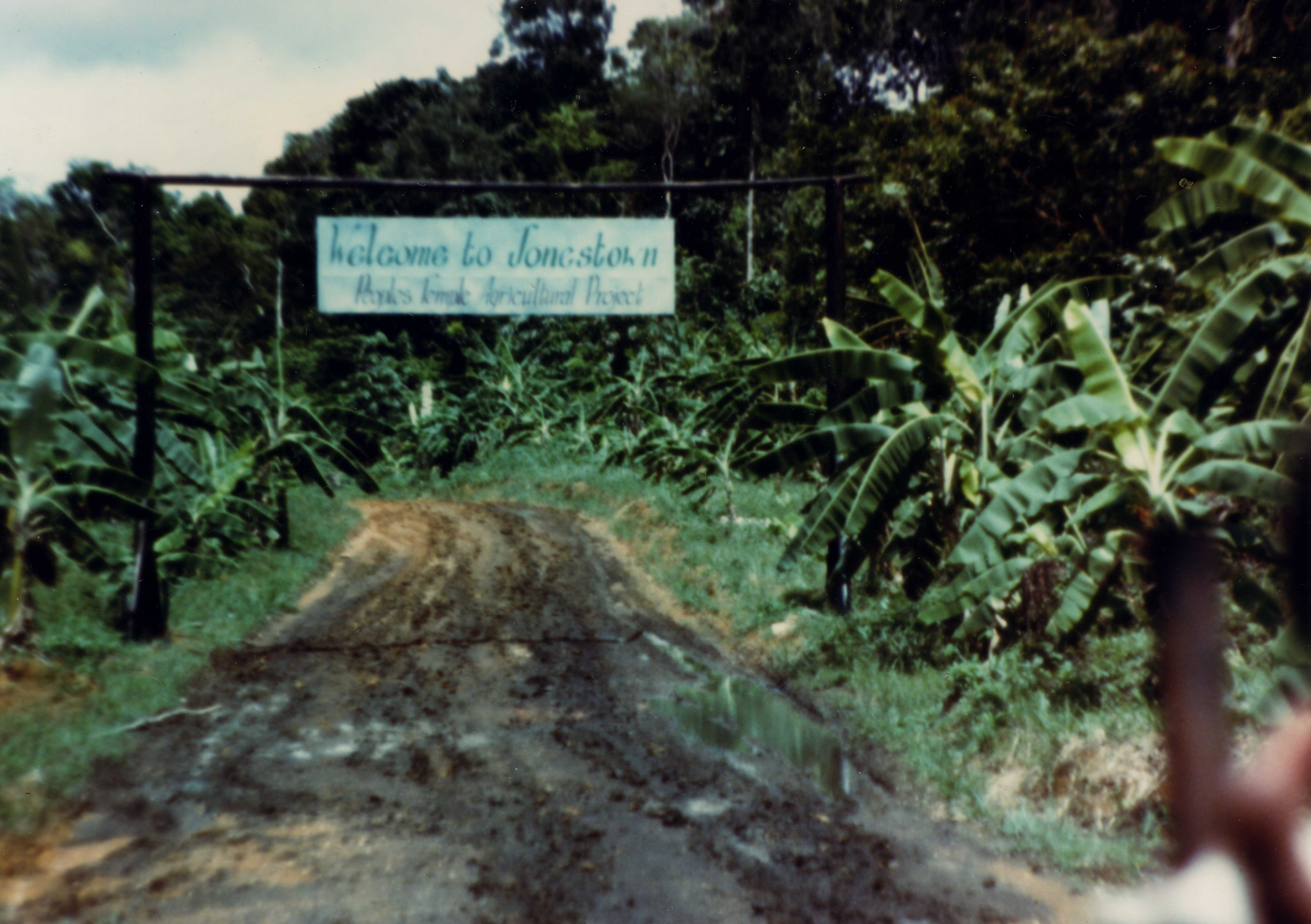
The entrance to Jonestown

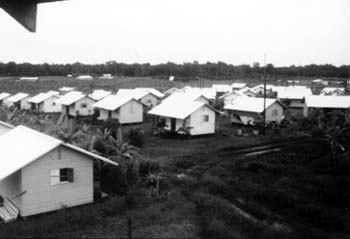
Housing in Jonestown

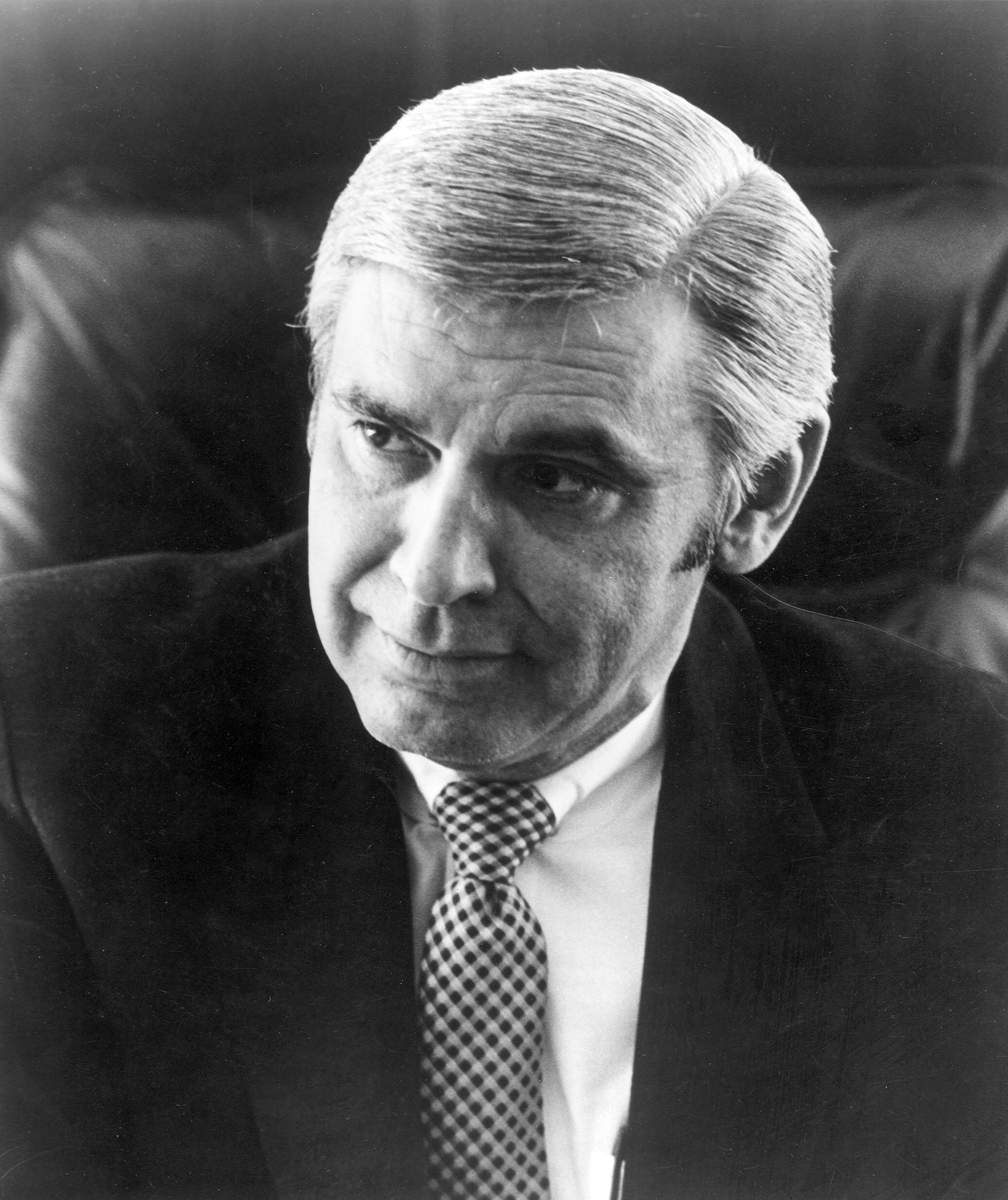
Congressman Leo Ryan

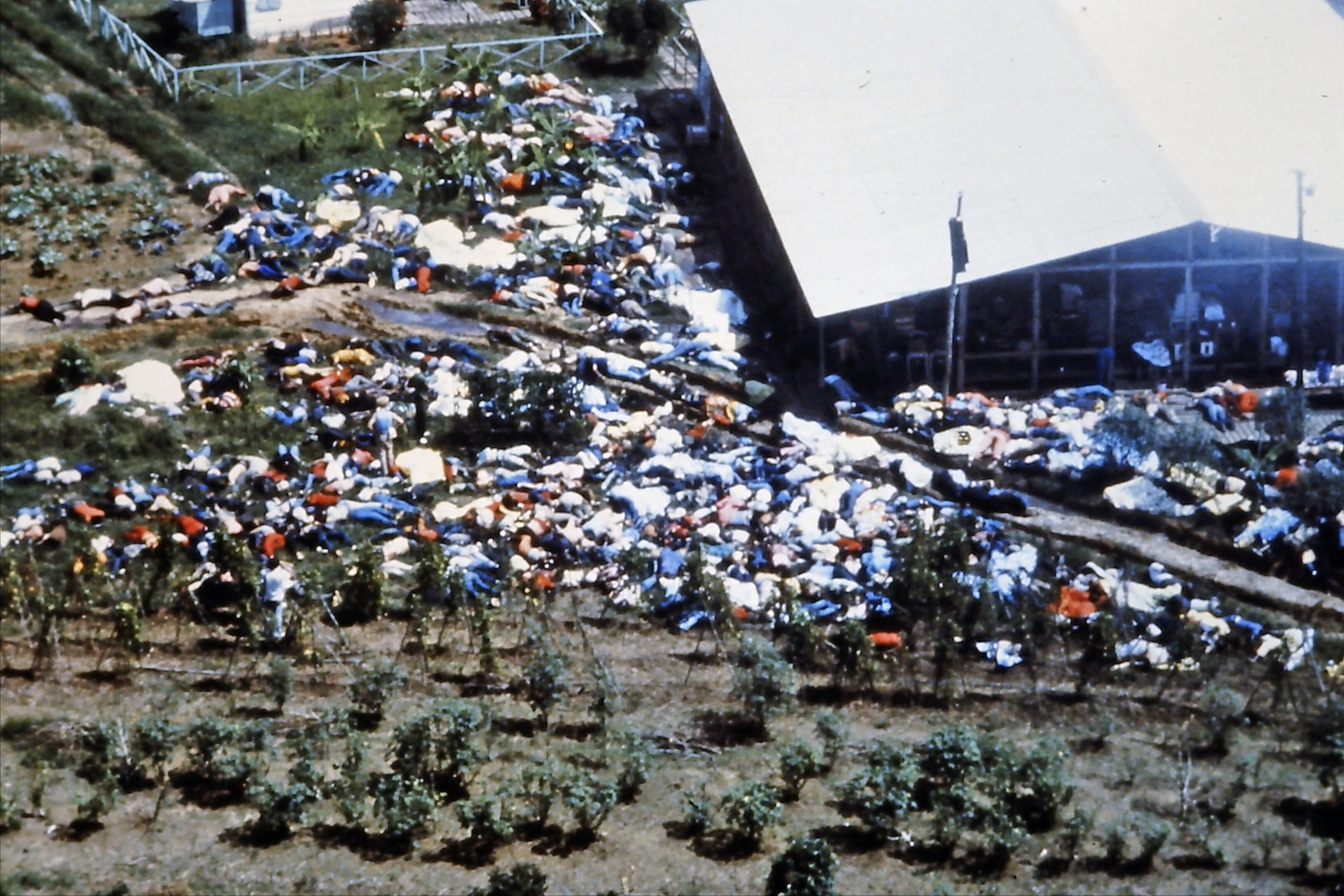
Bodies after the "revolutionary suicide" in Jonestown

=== Aftermath ===
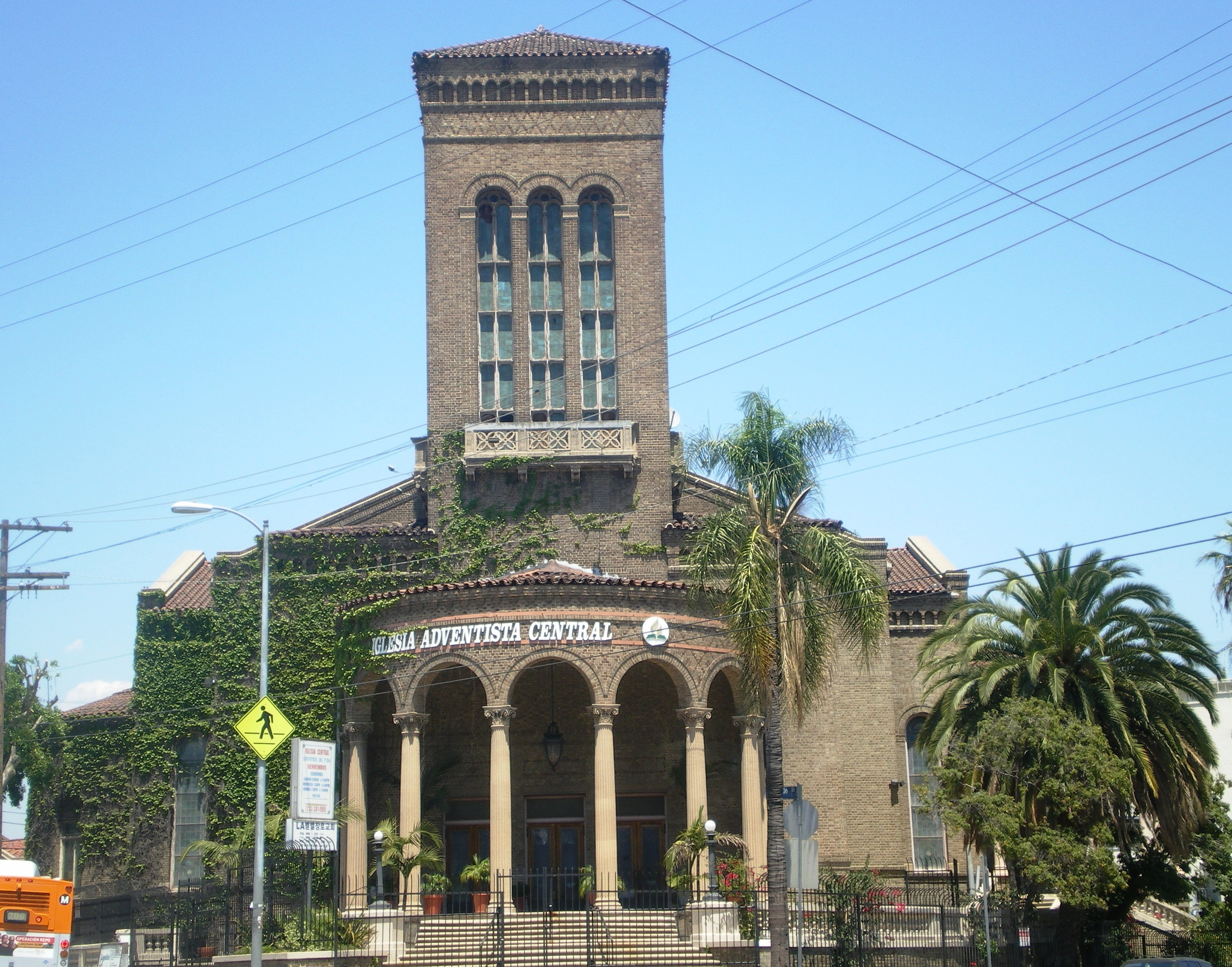
Temple building at 1366 S. Alvarado St., Los Angeles

The Temple's San Francisco headquarters was besieged by the national media and the relatives of the Jonestown victims. The mass killing became one of the best-known events in U.S. history as measured by the Gallup poll and appeared on the cover of several newspapers and magazines, including Time, for months afterward.

In addition, according to various press reports, after the Jonestown suicides, surviving Temple members in the U.S. announced their fears of being targeted by a "hit squad" which would be composed of Jonestown survivors. Similarly, in 1979, the Associated Press reported a U.S. Congressional aide's claim that there were "120 white, brainwashed assassins out from Jonestown awaiting the trigger word to pick up their hit."

Temple insider Michael Prokes, who had been ordered to deliver a suitcase which contained Temple funds which were supposed to be transferred to the Communist Party of the Soviet Union, killed himself in March 1979, four months after the Jonestown incident. In the days leading up to his death, Prokes sent notes to several people, together with a thirty-page statement he had written about the Temple. Caen reprinted one copy in his Chronicle column. Prokes then arranged for a press conference in a Modesto, California motel room, during which he read a statement to the eight reporters who attended. He then excused himself, entered a restroom, and fatally shot himself in the head.

Before the tragedy, Temple member Paula Adams engaged in a romantic relationship with Guyana's Ambassador to the United States, Laurence "Bonny" Mann. Adams later married Mann. On October 24, 1983, Mann fatally shot both Adams and the couple's child, and then fatally shot himself. Defecting member Harold Cordell lost twenty family members on the evening of the poisonings. The Bogues family, which had also defected, lost their daughter Marilee (age 18), while defector Vernon Gosney lost his son Mark (age 5).

The mass suicide of the Peoples Temple has helped embed the idea that all new religious movements are destructive in the public's mind. Bryan R. Wilson argues against that point of view by pointing out that only four other such events have occurred within similar religious groups: the Branch Davidians, the Solar Temple, Aum Shinrikyo and Heaven's Gate.

=== Bankruptcy and dissolution ===
At the end of 1978, the Temple declared bankruptcy, and its assets went into receivership. In light of lawsuits, on December 4, 1978, Charles Garry, the corporation's attorney, petitioned to dissolve the Temple. The petition was granted in San Francisco Superior Court in January 1979. A few Temple members remained in Guyana through May 1979 in order to wrap up the movement's affairs, then they returned to the United States.

The Temple's buildings in Los Angeles, Indianapolis, and Redwood Valley are all intact, as is the Temple's former Georgetown headquarters. Some former Temple buildings, such as the Los Angeles facility, are presently used by church congregations. The Temple's former San Francisco headquarters, located at 1859 Geary Boulevard, was destroyed in the 1989 Loma Prieta earthquake; the site is now occupied by a Post Office branch.

== See also ==
- Mass suicide
- Branch Davidians
- Cult
- Heaven's Gate
- Movement for the Restoration of the Ten Commandments of God
- Order of the Solar Temple

== Sources ==
- Chidester, David (2004). Salvation and Suicide: Jim Jones, the People's Temple and Jonestown (Religion in North America) (2nd ed.). Indiana University Press. ISBN 978-0253216328.
- Collins, John Andrew (2017). Jim Jones: The Malachi 4 Elijah Prophecy. Dark Mystery Publications. ISBN 978-1548102630.
- Guinn, Jeff (2017). The Road to Jonestown: Jim Jones and People Temple. Simon & Schuster. ISBN 978-1476763828.
- Hall, John R. (2004) [1987]. Gone from the Promised Land: Jonestown in American Cultural History. New Brunswick, New Jersey: Transaction Publishers. ISBN 978-0765805874.
- Layton, Deborah (1998). Seductive Poison. Anchor Books. ISBN 978-1854106001.
- Reiterman, Tom; Jacobs, John (1982). Raven: The Untold Story of Rev. Jim Jones and His People. E. P. Dutton. ISBN 978-0525241362.
- Wessinger, Catherine (2000). How the Millennium Comes Violently: From Jonestown to Heaven's Gate. Seven Bridges Press. ISBN 978-1889119243.

== Other media ==
- "God's Socialist" is a seven-part series released in 2020 on the Martyr Made Podcast. Centered on its primary subject, Jim Jones, the series explores his rise, influence, and the tragic events surrounding the Peoples Temple. To provide context for the world Jones was operating in, the series also offers a concise overview of the rise and decline of several far-left political organizations, including the Students for a Democratic Society, Black Panther Party, Weather Underground, and Symbionese Liberation Army. Additionally, it examines the hardships faced by residents of the South Bronx in the late 1960s and the impact of Martin Luther King Jr.'s nonviolent civil rights movement.
