= Catherine Wessinger =

American religion scholar

- Born: Catherine Lowman Wessinger; 1952 (age 73–74)

Academic background
- Education: University of Iowa (PhD)

Catherine Wessinger (/ˈwɛsɪŋər/, born 1952) is an American religion scholar. She is Professor Emerita of religious studies at Loyola University New Orleans where she taught religious studies with a main research focus on millennialism, new religions, women and religions, religions of India, and media and religion. She has been cited for her expertise concerning the Branch Davidians and other apocalyptic groups.

== Early life and education ==
She earned her Ph.D. in History of Religion from the University of Iowa in 1985.

== Works and career ==
She is Professor Emerita at Loyola University New Orleans where she taught religious studies with a main research focus on millennialism, new religions, women and religions, religions of India, and media and religion. Wessinger is co-general editor of Nova Religio: The Journal of Alternative and Emergent Religions. She has been cited for her expertise concerning the Branch Davidians and other millennial and apocalyptic groups. She served as a consultant to federal law enforcement during the Montana Freemen standoff. She is the editor of the Women in Religions series at New York University Press and she is co-editor of the Women in the World's Religions and Spirituality Project, part of the World Religions and Spirituality Project.

== Bibliography ==
- —— (1988). Annie Besant and Progressive Messianism. Edwin Mellen Press.
- ——, ed. (1993). Women's Leadership in Marginal Religions: Explorations Outside the Mainstream. University of Illinois Press.
- ——, ed. (1996). Religious Institutions and Women's Leadership: New Roles Inside the Mainstream. University of South Carolina Press.
- ——, ed. (2000). Millennialism, Persecution, and Violence: Historical Cases. Syracuse University Press.
- —— (2000). How the Millennium Comes Violently: From Jonestown to Heaven's Gate. Seven Bridges Press. ISBN 1-889119-24-5.
- Haldeman, Bonnie (2007). —— (ed.). Memories of the Branch Davidians: Autobiography of David Koresh's Mother. Baylor University Press.
- Martin, Sheila (2009). —— (ed.). When They Were Mine: Memoirs of a Branch Davidian Wife and Mother. Baylor University Press.
- ——, ed. (2011). Oxford Handbook of Millennialism. Oxford University Press.
- Doyle, Clive (2012). ——; Wittmer, Matthew D. (eds.). A Journey to Waco: Autobiography of a Branch Davidian. Rowman & Littlefield.
- —— (2020). Theory of Women in Religions. Women in Religions. New York University Press. ISBN 978-1-4798-0946-2.
