= How the Millennium Comes Violently =

2000 book by Catherine Wessinger

- Cover of the first edition
- Author: Catherine Wessinger
- Language: English
- Subject: Millennialist violence
- Publisher: Seven Bridges Press
- Publication date: 2000
- Publication place: United States
- Pages: 205
- ISBN: 1-889119-24-5
- OCLC: 42021377
- Dewey Decimal: 291.2
- LC Class: BL503.2.W47 2000

How the Millennium Comes Violently: From Jonestown to Heaven's Gate is a book about millennialist violence by Catherine Wessinger, published in 2000 by Seven Bridges Press. The book covers various millennialist new religious movements (NRMs) and their relation to violence, including the Peoples Temple, the Branch Davidians, Aum Shinrikyo, the Order of the Solar Temple, and Heaven's Gate, and attempts to set out a typology for dealing with millennial NRMs.

Critical reception was largely positive, with many reviewers describing it as one of the best books about the topic, though the specifics of some of her analytical methods were criticized, as was the chapter on the Branch Davidians.

== Background ==
Catherine Wessinger is a scholar of new religious movements. The book was written in the aftermath of both the Waco siege in 1993 and the Aum Shinrikyo Tokyo subway sarin attack in 1995. In the aftermath of the Waco siege, there had been increased concern among NRM researchers about the official responses and "cult stereotyping" worsening the situation in dealing with NRMs. After the aftermath of the sarin attack, there was a shift to concern over the internally caused sources of violence in some groups and their leaders.

At the time of the Waco standoff, Wessinger was chair of the New Religious Movements Group of the American Academy of Religion. At the time she had believed the news reports about the unfolding situation, but after the siege ended in the deaths of over 70 people she became compelled to research herself. She later became an activist by 1997.

== Contents ==
The book covers various millennialist NRMs and their relation to violence. There are nine chapters in total, six of which focus on specific groups. The book's chapters each cover Peoples Temple, the Branch Davidians, Aum Shinrikyo, the Montana Freemen (a group in which violence was averted) a chapter split between the Order of the Solar Temple and Heaven's Gate (as "Other Cases Briefly Considered"), and a chapter covering the Chen Tao (a non-violent group).

A foreword is given by Jayne Seminare Docherty, and an introduction chapter sets out Wessinger's background and her opinion on the "cult" moniker, which she views as a pejorative. It also discusses brainwashing as a concept, which Wessinger views as simplistic but not entirely without merit, and the "case studies" that the book focuses on. She then, in an eponymous chapter, discusses millennialism as a concept, which she defines as a "belief in a collective, terrestrial salvation".

She splits the groups into three categories (fragile, assaulted, and revolutionary), fitting the Peoples Temple, Solar Temple, Aum Shinrikyo, and Heaven's Gate as fragile, the Branch Davidians as assaulted, and the Montana Freemen as revolutionary.

== Reception ==
The book received a positive reception. Benjamin Zablocki described it as "among the best" of books relating to millennialist violence, while Thomas Robbins described it as "perhaps indispensable". Gordon Anderson described it as "probably the best book in existence on the subject of the interface between NRMs and violence." Reviewer Brenda E. Brasher criticized the book for what she considered some minor errors, such as editing problems and repetition issues, though described it overall as a "very worthwhile text".

The chapter on the Montana Freeman conflict, in which Wessinger had personal involvement, was particularly praised by reviewers, though the chapter on the Branch Davidians was criticized. Robbins described the chapter as "disconcerting in places" due to what he perceived as its "fervent tone" in describing the violence done to the group, while Zablocki said there was a "stridency" in the chapter that was not present in the rest of the book. He argued that in this chapter "attempts at evenhandedness are largely abandoned", and criticized the chapter's descriptions of ex-members, though agreed with the general argument of the chapter.

The reception to Wessinger's analytical methods was mixed. Zablocki argued that by dividing the six groups into three categories (putting four in one and the other two in one each) "there is no way that anyone can fairly assess the extent to which these categories (or dimensions) really delineate the species". Anderson praised the value of Wessinger's methods for determining whether a group may or may not become violent. Jean-François Mayer agreed with her categorization of the Order of the Solar Temple as a "fragile group", though noted the group itself had aimed to be seen as an "assaulted" one.

Some specific errors were criticized, especially in regard to the Solar Temple and Heaven's Gate, with Zablocki noting several "minor but unsettling inaccuracies in chronology". Brasher criticized the book for at times making "seriously questionable statements" with little supporting evidence, using for example Wessinger's claim that for black residents of Jonestown it had been an improvement on life in racist America. A review from Choice was mixed. They noted Wessinger was "obviously more knowledgable about the Branch Davidians and Montana Freedmen" out of the groups included in the volume, saying that she was "at her best as a chronicler" and that the sections related to that were excellent. The reviewer criticized the interpretations she drew as "simplistic, naive, and self-serving" and too defensive of her academic field and too critical of law enforcement.
