= Angel hair =

Angel hair may refer to:

== Food ==
- Capellini pasta, known as "angel hair" in English
- Fios de ovos, a Portuguese sweet dish
- Cabell d'àngel, a Catalan-Spanish sweet dish

== Other ==
- Angel hair (folklore), an ethereal substance said to emanate from UFOs
- Cuscuta or dodder, a genus of plants
- "Angel Hair", a song on the Black Dresses album Peaceful as Hell (2020)
- Angel Hair, a poetry publisher operated by Lewis Warsh
