= Demographics of Raëlism =

Raëlism is a UFO religion established in France during the 1970s. It soon spread to Quebec and then on to other parts of the world. There have been various attempts to estimate the number of Raëlians at different points.

== Estimates ==
Table of worldwide membership estimates
Date	Estimate	Scope	Reference
1974	170	World	International Raëlian Movement
1975	700	World	Raël
1979	3,000	World	Raël
1987-04-16	20,000	World	Chicago Sun-Times
1990-01-09	25,000	World	The Wichita Eagle
1992-08-28	30,000	40 countries	US Raëlian Movement
1993	35,000	World	Dr. Susan J. Palmer
1995-05-04	45,000	World	The Miami Herald
1996-01-14	35,000	World	The Miami Herald
1997-06-19	35,000	85 countries	San Jose Mercury News
1997-08-12	35,000	85 countries	The New York Times
1998-01	27,000	67 countries	Australian Association for the Study of Religions
1998	40,000	80 countries	University of Virginia
1998	40,000	World	St. Paul Pioneer Press
2000-10-10	50,000	85 countries	The Washington Post
2001-03-13	30,000	World	60 Minutes
2001	55,000	World	Dr. Susan J. Palmer
2001-06-30	55,000	84 countries	CNN
2002	55,000	World	Dr. Susan J. Palmer
2002-08-14	55,000	84 countries	Wired News
2002-12-29	40,000	World	Lexington Herald-Leader
2002-12-31	55,000	84 countries	The Orlando Sentinel
2002-12-31	55,000	World	AP Worldstream
2003-01-03	55,000	84 countries	AAP General News
2003-01-29	30,000	World	University Wire
2003-02-10	55,000	84 countries	Japan Today
2003	65,000	World	Dr. Susan J. Palmer
2003-08-03	60,000	World	Korea Times
2004-03-16	60,000	90 countries	Financial Times
2004-03-26	80,000	World	KLAS.com
2004-04-23	60,000	World	New Truth & TV Extra
2005-03-13	60,000	World	Japan Today
2005-05-05	65,000	85 countries	NBC 4
2005-11-18	60,000	92 countries	Middle East Times
2006-06-25	55,000	World	The Daily Telegraph
2006-12	65,000	86 countries	International Raëlian Movement
2010-11	14,192	World; Includes only members whose identity (name) is traced	International Raëlian Movement (Leaked Documents)
2011-9	85,000	90 countries	International Raëlian Movement
2013-12	90,000	90 countries	International Raëlian Movement
2017-09	18,111	World; Includes only members whose identity (name) is traced	International Raëlian Movement (Leaked Documents)

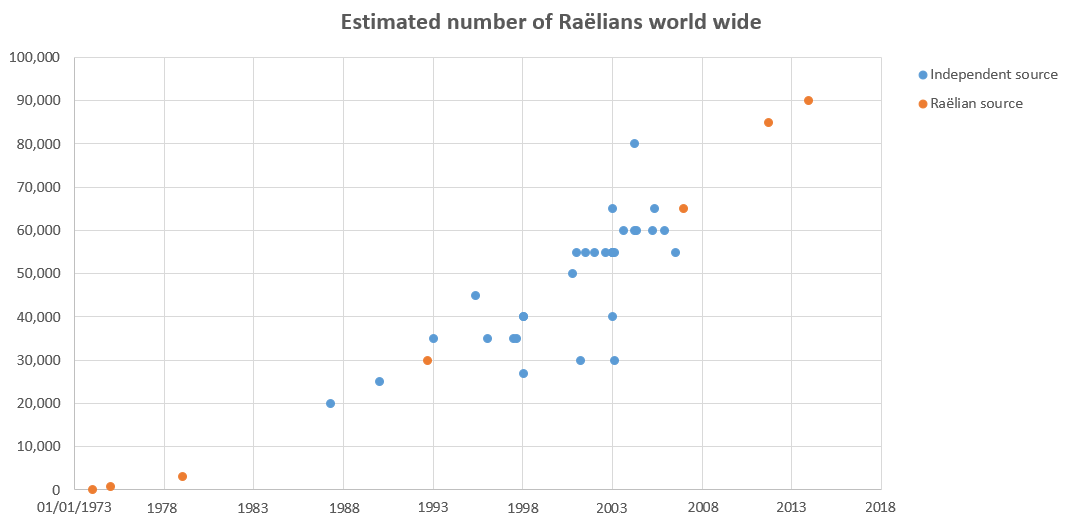
Membership estimates from various sources

Table of regional membership estimates
Date	Estimate	Scope	Reference
1995	4,000	Japan	University of Virginia
1995	4,000	Quebec	University of Virginia
1995	10,000	Europe	University of Virginia
1996-01-14	50	Miami	The Miami Herald
1996-01-14	600	United States	The Miami Herald
2001-08-08	24	South Florida	South Florida Sun-Sentinel
2002-12-31	5,000	South Korea	AP Worldstream
2003-02-10	6,000	Japan	Japan Today
2003-02-12	20 or more	Utah	KSL-TV
2003-04-04	1,000	United States	Las Vegas Sun
2003-04-20	50	Ireland	Irish Independent
2003-08-03	4,000	South Korea	Korea Times
2004-04-23	80	New Zealand	New Truth & TV Extra
2005-05-05	100	Southern California	NBC 4
2006-06-04	200	Australia	The Daily Telegraph
2021-06-08	27	India	Homegrown

From 1980 to 1992, Raël and his movement became increasingly global. In 1980, Claude Raël's fifth Raëlian book Sensual Meditation was published and formal publication of the Raëlian Messages in the Japanese language began as part of the Raëlian mission to Japan. Two years later, Africa became another target area in the mission to spread the Raëlian messages.
