= Bernard Siegel (attorney) =

American lawyer and nonprofit leader

Bernard Siegel is the executive director of the nonprofit Regenerative Medicine Foundation (formerly The Genetics Policy Institute) based in Wellington, Florida.

A graduate of the University of Miami undergraduate and law, he is an attorney and member of the Florida Bar since 1975. He is best known for filing the landmark 2002 case seeking a guardian for the world's first alleged human clone, "Baby Eve."

The case has been widely credited for exposing Clonaid, the so-called "human cloning company" as a sham. Clonaid presented itself as the scientific research laboratory of a Canadian-based religious group called the Räelian Movement. The Räelians believe that cloning technology is a gift that will provide human immortality, brought to earth by extraterrestrials. They have collected large sums of money from at least one couple, allegedly to provide them with a child cloned from one of the parents’ DNA. The legal hearings brought about by Siegel exposed the cult's lack of credibility when they failed to produce an allegedly cloned child for the purpose of DNA testing, which would have proven whether or not the child was a clone.

However, the case was the subject of intense international media attention because it shined a spotlight on the cloning issue and the emerging and enormously promising field of stem cell research. It was also the catalyst for Siegel to trade in his 30-year courtroom career to found the Genetics Policy Institute (now called the Regenerative Medicine Foundation). The Regenerative Medicine Foundation is now a world leader in supporting the global cause of stem cell research by promoting sound, ethical research within a framework of supportive public policy. The institute does this through public education initiatives, meetings among experts and activists, its comprehensive website and published information, and sponsorship of the Student Society for Stem Cell Research. In only three years’ time, the SSSCR has grown into an education and advocacy organization having a presence in 15 countries, 35 states, 100 institutions and more than 25 active chapters at universities around the country.

Since the 2002 legal case, Siegel has become a recognized policy expert relating to stem cell research, regenerative medicine and human cloning. He has appeared as an expert on the CBS Evening News with Dan Rather, CNN, CNN International, MSNBC, and network news shows throughout the U.S. and the world. He has been profiled on National Public Radio's All Things Considered and has been quoted in The New York Times, The Washington Post, The Boston Globe, The Times, Le Monde, Pravda, People's Daily and other publications throughout the U.S. and the world. Siegel gives frequent lectures on stem cells and public policy, speaking before the United Nations, international and U.S.-based biotechnology groups, and at numerous colleges and universities.

In both 2003 and 2004, Siegel played a pivotal role in protecting a form of stem cell research in the United Nations, which was under the threat of being banned by world treaty. In 2003, he brought some of the world's most prominent stem cell research scientists together at a meeting at the U.N. to educate delegates about the need to ban human reproductive cloning (the cloning of a whole person) while keeping nuclear transfer research (for the cloning of stem cells) legal throughout the world. That very year, the U.N. avoided the passage of a treaty that would have banned nuclear transfer research worldwide by a single vote. In 2004, the treaty was downgraded to a nonbinding resolution that left the matter of whether or not to allow nuclear transfer up to the various nations.

Siegel's work has been profiled in two books on stem cell research. Ian Wilmut described Mr. Siegel as an “unsung hero” in his book, After Dolly: The Uses and Misuses of Human Cloning. Siegel's exploits in court versus the Räelians and in leading the battle to save stem cell research in the United Nations are the subject of an entire chapter, called “The Battle for Hearts and Minds,” in "Stem Cell Wars: Inside Stories from the Frontlines" by Eve Herold (who is herself an official with the Genetics Policy Institute).
