= Clonaid =

Human cloning organization

- Type: Private
- Industry: Biotechnology
- Predecessor: Valiant Venture Ltd.
- Founded: Bahamas (1997)
- Founder: Raël
- Headquarters: Riverside California
- Key people: Brigitte Boisselier, Thomas Kaenzig
- Products: RMX568, RMX2010
- Services: CLONAID, INSURACLONE, OVULAID, CLONAPET
- Subsidiaries: BioFusion Tech Inc.
- Website: clonaid.com

Clonaid is an American-based human cloning organization, registered as a company in the Bahamas. Founded in 1997, it has philosophical ties with the UFO religion Raëlism, which sees cloning as the first step in achieving immortality. On December 27, 2002, Clonaid's chief executive, Brigitte Boisselier, claimed that a baby clone, named Eve, was born. Media coverage of the claim sparked serious criticism and ethical debate that lasted more than a year. Florida attorney Bernard Siegel tried to appoint a special guardian for Eve and threatened to sue Clonaid, because he was afraid that the child might be treated like a lab rat. Siegel, who heard the company's actual name was not Clonaid, decided that the Clonaid project was a sham. Bioethicist Alta Charo condemned Clonaid for premature human experimentation and noted the high incidence of malformations and thousands of fetal deaths in animal cloning.

== Company founding ==
On May 31, 1997, an issue of the popular science magazine New Scientist said that the International Raëlian Movement was starting a company to fund the research and development of human cloning. This alarmed bioethicists who were opposed to such plans. They warned lawmakers against failing to regulate human cloning. At the time, European countries such as Britain had banned human cloning, but the United States had merely a moratorium on the use of federal funds for human cloning research. U.S. President Bill Clinton requested that private companies pass their own moratorium. Claude Vorilhon, the founder of Raëlism, was opposed to this move and denied that the technology used to clone was inherently dangerous.

On June 15, 1998, Brigitte Boisselier said the headquarters of Clonaid was located in Las Vegas and that Clonaid did not have enough funds for human cloning research. On December 19, 1998, a New Scientist article said the cost of Clonaid cloning services would be $200,000, much lower than the $2.3 million that researchers at Texas A&M University planned to use for cloning a dog named Missy. Mainstream scientists said it was unlikely that Clonaid would be able to clone anything in the near future. Although the project's ultimate objective was human cloning, Boisselier said that pet cloning would help finance the operations.

=== Premise ===
On June 9, 1997, Clonaid stated its intention to offer homosexual and/or infertile couples the chance to have a genetically identical child and take a step toward immortality. According to an Internet announcement, the Raëlian leader and a group of investors founded a company in the Bahamas and called it Valiant Venture Ltd., whose project mission was named Clonaid. Valiant Venture expected to have one million potential customers.

Claude Vorilhon held a meeting in a Montreal hotel on September 21, 2000, where he announced that a wealthy American couple was willing to fund the Clonaid project. The first pending clone, according to Vorilhon at the time, was the couple's 10-month-old girl, who had died due to a medical mistake. He said that the couple was willing to pay $1,500,000 to clone their deceased daughter, but the wife was not willing to be the surrogate mother. Jamie Grifo, a fertility specialist at the New York University School of Medicine, and Nobel laureate Paul Berg of Stanford University said that Vorilhon was providing a false hope that the child was going to be the same one. Boisselier revealed the roles of four scientists she says were involved—"a biochemist, a geneticist, a cell fusion expert and a French medical doctor"—but without revealing their identity. She did not identify the wealthy American couple.

=== Responses by scientists ===
According to cloning specialist and physiologist George Seidel of Colorado State University, cloning a human being would not be difficult if many people donated their eggs or offered their wombs for implantation of clone embryos. Lee Silver, a molecular biologist from Princeton University, noted the advantages that Raëlians had, as a pro-cloning religious group, in finding willing surrogates. A biotechnology company called Advanced Cell Technology had cloned human embryo cells for medical purposes, and its CEO Michael D. West said that the directions for cloning a human being were available in published scientific literature. Experts knowledgeable of the scientific advances in the field have noted that human reproductive chemistry is better understood than that of most animals. For this reason, they thought that a higher rate of success was possible in human cloning compared with animal cloning. Brigitte Boisselier anticipated that the work could begin on the preserved cells as soon as October, but there was no evidence that Clonaid had medical knowledge necessary for its success. There was no evidence that the Clonaid claim was more than a publicity stunt. No verification or evidence proving that a successful clone has been made.

== Year before the alleged clone baby claim ==
In the spring of 2001, the Food and Drug Administration Office of Criminal Investigations inspected Clonaid's lab in the small city of Nitro in West Virginia. It was located inside a rented room within a former high school. Staff scientists reviewed the lab's research documentation and found them inadequate, the work of a graduate student extracting ovum from cow ovaries from a slaughterhouse. The FDA said that the equipment in lab was state-of-the-art and had been bought by Mark Hunt, a then-former West Virginia state legislator and future Auditor of West Virginia, who wanted to clone his 10-month-old son, Andrew, who died in 1999 due to congenital heart disease. Following investigation of the West Virginia lab, Mark Hunt made an agreement with the FDA-OCI to not clone his dead son within the United States.

In March 2001, Boisselier said that a woman would be pregnant with a cloned fetus in April. She said that cells had reached the blastocyst stage, but she refused to speak of any specific implantation or pregnancy associated with them. According to a CNN article that November, the Clonaid laboratory was outside the United States. Clonaid claimed that it had developed human cloned embryos before Advanced Cell Technology was able to do the same. CNN could not confirm the unpublished work. Due to Clonaid's association with Raëlians and the lack of evidence for cloning, authorities remained skeptical as to whether Clonaid could clone anything at all.

== Alleged clone baby Eve ==
On Friday, December 27, 2002, Boisselier, a Raëlian bishop and CEO of Clonaid, announced at a press conference in Hollywood, Florida that Clonaid had successfully performed the first human reproductive cloning. Boisselier said that the mother delivered Eve by Caesarean section somewhere outside the United States and that both were healthy. Dr. Boisselier did not present the mother or child, or DNA samples that would allow for confirmation of her claim at the press conference. It has subsequently become apparent that she announced the birth before genetic testing to evaluate whether the child in question is actually a clone: Dr. Boisselier was therefore stating her belief that her procedure had resulted in a clone, not announcing results showing that the child was a clone.

Shortly after the announcement, Korean prosecutors raided the offices of Clonaid's Korean branch, BioFusion Tech. In the process, the prosecutors removed records from homes and offices while barring two representatives of BioFusion Tech from leaving the country. An official company statement revealed that three Korean women applied to become surrogate mothers. Officials of BioFusion Tech told the prosecutors that 10 Korean women wanted to clone themselves and have filled out applications.

The Food and Drug Administration stated its intention to investigate Clonaid to see if it had done anything illegal. The FDA contended that its regulations forbid human cloning without prior agency permission. However, some members of the United States Congress believed that the jurisdiction of the FDA on human cloning matters was shaky and decided to push Congress to explicitly ban human cloning.

=== Responses by politicians and ethicists ===
US President George W. Bush said that human cloning was "deeply troubling" to most Americans. Kansas Republican Sam Brownback said that Congress should ban all human cloning, while some Democrats were worried that Clonaid's announcement would lead to the banning of therapeutic cloning. FDA biotechnology chief Dr. Phil Noguchi warned that the human cloning, even if it worked, risked transferring sexually transmitted diseases to the newly born child. The White House was also critical of the claims.

Panos Zavos, a former professor of the University of Kentucky, at the time had plans to create human clone embryos, but he stated to the effect that Clonaid's claims were without merit and that Eve did not exist. Severino Antinori, who had worked with Zavos on the development of human clone embryos, was critical of Klondyke's announcement, and said of it that, "An announcement of this type has no scientific corroboration and risks creating confusion." Robert Lanza of Advanced Cell Technologies said that Clonaid has no record of accomplishment for cloning anything, but he said that if Clonaid actually succeeded, there would be public unrest that may lead to the banning of therapeutic cloning, which has the capacity to cure millions of patients. The Vatican said that the claims expressed a mentality that was brutal and lacked ethical consideration. The Christian Coalition of America urged a human cloning ban and saw the alleged clone baby as an "aberration".

University of Wisconsin–Madison bioethicist Alta Charo said that even in other ape-like mammals, the risk for miscarriage, birth defects, and life problems remains high. Arthur Caplan, the director of the Center for Bioethics at the University of Pennsylvania, expressed concerns that many dead and sick children could result from the cloning of human beings.

=== Request for a temporary guardian ===
Clonaid spokeswoman Nadine Gary claimed that Eve went home with her mother on December 30, 2002, but Florida attorney Bernard Siegel filed a petition as a private citizen in the Broward County Circuit Court requesting that a temporary guardian be appointed for the purported cloned child. Two local attorneys, Barry Wax and Jonathan Schwartz were retained to represent Clonaid in the matter. As the court case played out over the next month, Dr. Boisselier testified under oath that there was a cloned child born outside of the U.S. living in Israel. However, Clonaid did not present demonstrative evidence that the child really existed. Boisselier said that Eve would travel to the United States that day for DNA tests. She said that a pediatrician saw Eve and her mother in good condition, but she refused to mention the location of the surrogate birth, the testing lab, or the biological mother's home, which she wanted to reveal at a later time. The mother was said to be 31 years old with an infertile husband.

Siegel subpoenaed Thomas Kaenzig, a vice president of Clonaid, to appear on a civil proceeding set to occur on January 22, 2003. Siegel's office sent summonses to Thomas Kaenzig and "Jane Doe", the purported mother of Eve. Siegel hoped that the action would coax those involved to provide some answers. He believed the child, if she existed, needed an appointed guardian and would need extensive medical treatment which he doubted Clonaid could offer. He wanted the court to make a decision on how to best protect her. However, Clonaid prevented scientists from meeting the purported child and mother.

=== Request for a DNA verification test ===
Michael Guillen, a former ABC News science editor, made an agreement with Boisselier for him to choose independent experts to test for a DNA match. Clonaid refused to identify the independent experts, because if revealed too soon, others could track the baby from the testing place into the mother's house. Clonaid said the parents had the final say on whether they want to test the baby and that a Dutch lesbian couple would be the parents of the next cloned baby. Boisselier said she would hand over the evidence to show that a clone had been born but was concerned that the details of Clonaid's cloning procedure might leak out. The next day, Vorilhon claimed that the baby was healthy. He said those who are against cloning for ethical reasons would be dismayed if the clone baby was in good condition.

Thomas Kaenzig refused to testify in a court hearing, but Florida judge John Frusciante Sr., father of musician John Frusciante, was able to convince Kaenzig through a telephone call to reveal some of the details. Kaenzig testified that Clonaid left him ignorant of the cloning project and that it was not even a corporation. The judge summoned Kaenzig and Brigitte Boisselier to a Florida court and warned the two that they would be condemned if they did not show there on January 29, 2003. As the court case played out, Boisselier testified under oath that she saw videos of a cloned child born in Israel.

Michael Guillen was disappointed when he discovered that Clonaid withdrew their offer to provide the tests. The company said that before the tests were done, the parents wanted to be sure that their baby would not be sent away, but Florida attorney Bernard Siegel asked that a guardian for Eve be appointed and threatened the company with a lawsuit. Guillen, who remained skeptical, said it would be unwise to dismiss the Clonaid project without proper confirmation.

== Claims of further human clones ==
The day after Boisselier made her announcement, she added that four more human clones were to be born within a few weeks, Boisselier claimed that Clonaid had a list of couples who were ready to have a cloned child. and that 20 more implantations of human clones were on the way after the first 10 which happened in the previous year. She said that other companies have used cloning procedures with different specifics that lead to their high failure rate. Boisselier argued that failed attempts at human cloning would be like those of in vitro fertilization where early miscarriages occurred more frequently than abortions. Nevertheless, she said that if "deformities or abnormalities" were detected in a cloned fetus, the fetus would be aborted.

Raëlian spokesman Bart Overvliet claimed that another cloned baby was born to a Dutch lesbian couple in the Netherlands the previous day and that the mother and baby were in good health. A Dutch Raëlian spokeswoman could not comment on any further details about the mother, but Boisselier said that the mother gave birth to her own clone. An official from the Dutch Health Ministry told Reuters that the Netherlands forbade human cloning but not the birth of baby clones. On January 5, 2003, Brigitte Boisselier said to the BBC that her medical team produced hundreds of human clone embryos before proceeding to ten implantations, two of which led to births. The head of the UK Roslin Institute was critical of the assertion, "Clonaid [has] no track record but claim[s] to have cloned hundreds of embryos – it just doesn't ring true."

A Raëlian spokeswoman from Japan claimed that a baby boy, cloned from a comatose two-year-old of a Japanese couple, was born the previous day. Boisselier said that a surrogate participated since the biological mother was 41 and more likely to have a miscarriage. Scientists knew that many cloned animals suffer arthritis and ailments with the lungs and liver, and they were concerned that too many unanswered questions surround the prospect of cloning of humans safely. Clonaid set up press conferences in which they described their method of cloning, but they did not give any details. However, they did say that the third cloning was different in that it did not involve a mother's egg, but the surrogate's egg with the injection of the boy's DNA.

According to Boisselier, Mark and Tracy Hunt, who were seeking to clone their dead son, invested $500,000 in the former Clonaid lab in West Virginia and its equipment, which the Food and Drug Administration shut down. The Clonaid CEO proposed a cloning lab on Brazilian Island for creating the next generation of clone babies. Clonaid claimed that five baby clones were born between December 26, 2002, and February 4, 2003, which had developed normally.

In late July 2002, Clonaid's branch in South Korea, BioFusion Tech, said a woman became pregnant with a human clone. However, in the week of September 27, 2002, South Korea's Ministry of Health and Welfare announced that it would ban human cloning and sentence violators to a 10-year prison term.

In February 2004, Clonaid claimed that a sixth clone baby was born in Australia. Additionally, it claimed to have produced human embryos in South Korea. The small number of companies that have access to cloning technology has resulted skepticism by cloning experts in Korea, who accused Clonaid of defaming the now debunked stem cell work of Doctor Hwang Woo-suk. By March 2004, Clonaid claimed that eight extra baby clones had been brought to term for a total of thirteen baby clones.

In September 2018, rapper Kid Buu claimed he was a human clone produced by Clonaid. However, this is commonly perceived as a publicity stunt.

== Embryonic cell fusion machine ==
Besides offering cloning services, Clonaid has developed one product, an "embryonic cell fusion device" called the RMX 2010.

Clonaid, a human cloning firm, has established an affiliate company in Korea, participants at the International Bio Expo in Japan said Thursday. Participants and foreign media who attended the first biotechnology exposition in Tokyo, said that Clonaid's vice president Thomas Kaenzig claimed that BioFusion Tech Inc., a South Korean company owned by Clonaid, had developed an "embryonic cell fusion system or RMX2010." The sources in Japan said that the RMX2010 allegedly creates a stable electronic pulse required to develop human embryos to the blastocyst stage. The blastocyst stage is the state an embryo reaches five or six days after it has been fertilized, which is a critical step to instigate the cloning procedure. They also said that Kaenzig believes human cloning will become "commonplace" within ten years, though he failed to comment on any advances the company has made toward actually cloning a human being. Related to this, an official at BioFusion Tech Inc. confirmed that the company was set up two months ago as a wholly owned subsidiary of Clonaid and that there were currently three Korean technicians and six foreign employees working at the company. The BioFusion employee also said that about 10 Koreans have asked for cloning services, which according to the company Web site (www.clonaid.com) can cost around $200,000.

— Korea Herald, 2002

CNN Money has listed the RMX 2010 as the fourth "Dumbest Moment in Business 2003", stating "Clonaid sells the RMX 2010, a $9,220 contraption that ... well, nobody's quite sure what it does. To help clarify the matter, Clonaid lends one to a British science museum—under strict orders not to open it to find out what's inside."

== Additional skepticism ==
Scientists interviewed about the announcement expressed skepticism regarding both the authenticity and the ethics of Clonaid's procedures. These included Lord Robert Winston, head of the IVF research team at London's Hammersmith Hospital, and Tanja Dominko of the Oregon Regional Primate Center's monkey cloning project. Scientists with experience in animal cloning have encountered low rates of success per implantation, where cloned fetuses are often malformed and dead before birth. Regardless, people continue to be surprised that Clonaid appears to have overcome those problems; either Clonaid has been extremely lucky in discovering a superior method of cloning, or the company is making false claims.

Clonaid charges up to $200,000 for its "cloning" services. Clonaid has not shown verifiable evidence of any human cloning, despite claims that they would do this within days of their initial announcement. They claim that the parents of the first cloned child had second thoughts about submitting their child to scientific tests after attorney Bernard Siegel filed suit. According to sealed court documents received by the Boston Globe which were reported on 27 April 2003, Clonaid had two employees but no address or board of directors. CBS News reported that Clonaid was not a company. Boisselier revealed that in a strict sense, Clonaid was just the product name, even though Clonaid's website had touted it as the company name.
