= United Nations Declaration on Human Cloning =

UN statement against human cloning

The United Nations Declaration on Human Cloning was a nonbinding statement against all forms of human cloning approved by a divided UN General Assembly.

The vote came in March 2005, after four years of debate and an end to attempts for an international ban.

In the 191-nation assembly, there were 84 votes in favor of a nonbinding statement, 34 against and 37 abstentions.

Proposed by Honduras, the statement was largely supported by Roman Catholic countries and opposed by countries with active embryonic stem cell research programs. Many Islamic nations abstained.

The UN Declaration on Human Cloning, as it is named, calls for all member states to adopt a ban on human cloning, which it says is "incompatible with human dignity and the protection of human life."

The US, which has long pushed for a complete ban, voted in favor of the statement while traditional ally Britain, where therapeutic cloning is legal and regulated, voted against it.

The statement should have no impact on countries that allow therapeutic cloning, such as Britain and South Korea, as it is not legally binding.

"The foes of therapeutic cloning are trying to portray this as a victory for their ideology," Bernard Siegel, a Florida attorney who lobbies to defend therapeutic cloning, said in a Reuters report. "But this confusing declaration is an effort to mask their failure last November to impose a treaty on the world banning therapeutic cloning."
