= Clitoraid =

Raëlian non-profit project

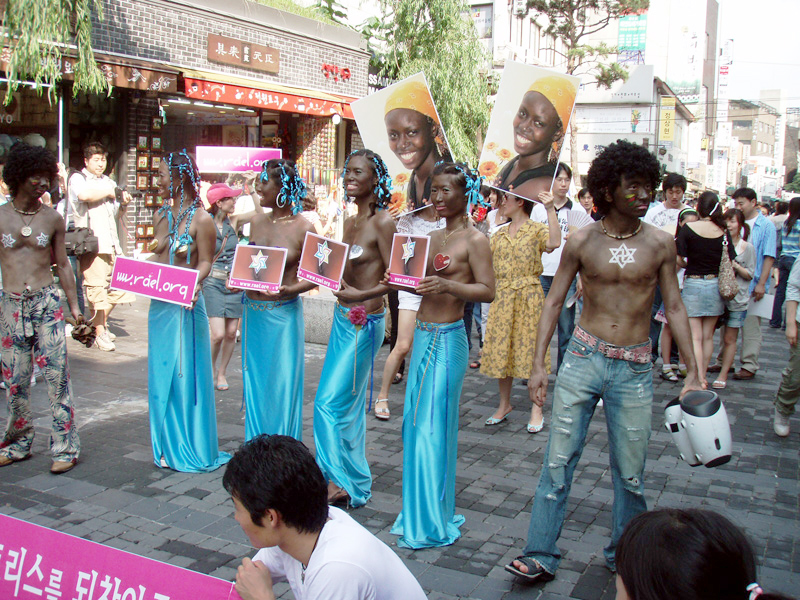
Clitoraid Adopt a Clitoris event in South Korea, July 2006

Clitoraid is a non-profit project started by the Raëlian movement to combat female genital mutilation.

The project was started in 2005 or 2006. The Raëlian movement sees sexual gratification as a positive thing and Clitoraid has sponsored clitoral reconstruction for African women and sought to build a hospital in Burkina Faso where they can also receive post-operative instruction in masturbation. Clitoraid has an Adopt a Clitoris sponsorship program, which it has promoted at the AVN Adult Entertainment Expo in Las Vegas.

In 2010, on the encouragement of sexologist Betty Dodson, the San Francisco-based sex shop chain Good Vibrations pledged financial support to Clitoraid including asking customers to make donations; the company rescinded the offer after protests that the effort was misplaced, especially from Wanjiru Kamau-Rutenberg, a professor of politics at the University of San Francisco. In 2013, Clitoraid designated the week of 6–12 May as "International Clitoris Awareness Week".

The 2014 opening of the Kamkaso Hospital or The Pleasure Hospital at Bobo-Dioulasso was delayed by the Burkina Faso Ministry of Health. Clitoraid blamed the Catholic Church.

For spring 2026, Clitoraid set a goal of 15-18 reconstructive surgeries in Nairobi, Kenya. They document the surgeries on their youtube channel.

Other charities that work in the field of clitoris reconstruction and helping women heal from FGM include the Marci Foundation led by Dr. Marci Bowers and the Desert Flower Foundation, at four locations.
