= Angel hair (folklore) =

Material allegedly emitted by UFOs

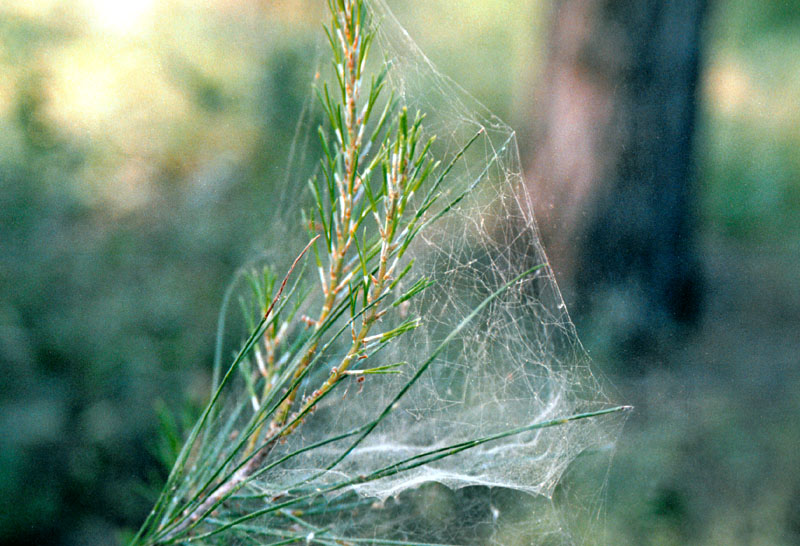
A spiderweb, one of the potential causes of Angel hair phenomena

Angel hair, siliceous cotton, or Mary's yarn is a sticky, fibrous substance reported in connection with UFO sightings, or manifestations of the Virgin Mary. It has been described as being like a cobweb or a jelly.

It is named for its similarity to fine hair, and in some cases, the substance has been found to be the web threads of migrating spiders. Reports of angel hair say that it disintegrates or evaporates within a short time of forming. Angel hair is an important aspect of the UFO religion Raëlism, and one theory among ufologists is that it is created from "ionized air sleeting off an electromagnetic field" that surrounds a UFO.

== Sightings ==
There have been many reports of falls of angel hair around the world. Angel hair was reported at the Miracle at Fatima on 13 September and 13 October 1917.

The most widely reported incidence occurred in Oloron, France in 1952, when "great flakes" were reported as falling from a nearly cloudless sky. On October 27, 1954, Gennaro Lucetti and Pietro Lastrucci reported standing on the balcony of a hotel in St. Mark's Square in Venice and seeing two "shining spindles" flying across the sky leaving a trail of the angel hair. On the same day over 250km away in Florence, two similar objects were also witnessed to be releasing angel hair by 10,000 soccer fans.

In New Zealand and Australia, local newspapers have reported many sightings since the 1950s, although many have been identified as spider webs after analysis. An incident was reported in Polonnaruwa, Sri Lanka on October 20, 2014.

== Published explanations ==
Explanations based on known phenomena include:

- Some types of spiders are known to migrate through the air, sometimes in large numbers, on cobweb gliders. Many cases of angel hair were found to be these spider threads and, in one occasion, small spiders have been found on the material. Linyphiidae spiders frequently cause showers of gossamer threads in England and the Northern hemisphere. Australia and New Zealand have frequent cases, caused by several native species of spiders and by some introduced species of Linyphiidae.
- In Évora, Portugal, on November 2, 1959, a substance described as angel hair was collected and analyzed under a microscope by a local school director and later by armed forces technicians and scientists of the University of Lisbon. The scientists concluded that the angel hair was likely produced by a small insect of an unknown species or perhaps some kind of single-celled organism.
- Atmospheric electricity may cause floating dust particles to become polarized, and attraction between these polarized dust particles may cause them to join together, to form long filaments.
- On two occasions, samples were sent for testing. On October 13, 1917, a sample found at Cova da Iria was sent to Lisbon and on October 17, 1957, another sample found at Cova da Iria was examined. The analysis found this to be natural, consisting of white flakes. When put under a microscope it was found to be a vegetable product, not animal.
- The sample from Florence on October 27, 1954 was tested very soon after collection. "Prof Giovanni Canneri subjected the material to spectrographic analysis and concluded that it contained the elements boron, silicon, calcium and magnesium, and that it was not radioactive."

Unscientific explanations based on beliefs regarding Unidentified Flying Objects include:

- Ionized air may be sleeting off the electromagnetic field that surrounds a UFO.
- Excess energy converted into matter.
- The usage by UFOs of a G-field would cause heavy atoms in ordinary air to react among themselves and produce a kind of precipitate that falls to the ground and disappears as the ionization decreases.

Explanations based on folklore include:

- During the ascension of the Virgin Mary, her veil was torn and spread throughout the air, leading to the title of Mary's yarn.

== Angel grass ==
"Angel grass" is a related phenomenon. It is when short metallic threads fall from the sky, often forming intertwined loose masses. They are a type of chaff, a radar counter-measure which can be in the form of fine strands, which is dropped by some military aircraft. It can also come from sounding rockets and balloons, which would have released it at high altitude for radar tracking.

== Literature ==
- William R. Corliss: Tornados, Dark Days, Anomalous Precipitation, and related weather phenomena (The Sourcebook Project, 1983), pages 60 to 62, GWF8: Prodigious Falls of Web-Like Material.

== See also ==
- Pele's hair
- Manna
- Star jelly
- Ectoplasm
- Yellow rain
- Red rain in Kerala
