= Raëlism =

UFO religion

- The Raëlian symbol
- Type: New Religious Movement
- Classification: UFO religion
- Scripture: Main: Intelligent Design: Message from the Designers; Minor: Sensual Meditation, Let's Welcome the Extra-terrestrials, Geniocracy, Yes to Human Cloning and The Maitreya
- Polity: Episcopal
- Planétaire guider: Raël
- Associations: ARAMIS; Clitoraid; Clonaid; NOPEDO; Order of Angels
- Region: Worldwide
- Headquarters: Geneva, Switzerland
- Founder: Raël
- Origin: 19 September 1974; 52 years ago Auvergne, France
- Embassy: 50+
- Other names: Raëlianism and Raëlian movement
- Official website: www.rael.org

Raëlism, (Note: /ˈreɪlɪzəm/) also known as Raëlianism, is a UFO religion founded in the 1970s in France by Claude Vorilhon, now known as Raël. (Note: /reɪl/) Scholars of religion classify Raëlism as a new religious movement. The group is formalised as the International Raëlian Movement (IRM) or Raëlian Church, a hierarchical organisation under Raël's leadership.

Raëlism teaches that an extraterrestrial species known as the Elohim created humankind by using their advanced technology. An atheistic religion, it holds that the Elohim have historically been mistaken for gods. It claims that throughout history the Elohim have created 40 Elohim/human hybrids who have served as prophets preparing humankind for news about their origins. Among them are the Buddha, Jesus, and Muhammad, with Raël himself the 40th and final prophet. Raëlians believe that since the atomic bombing of Hiroshima in 1945, humans have entered an Age of Apocalypse in which it threatens itself with nuclear annihilation. Raëlism holds that humans must find a way to harness new scientific and technological development for peaceful purposes, and that when this has been achieved the Elohim will return to Earth to share their technology with humankind and establish a utopia. To this end, Raëlians have sought to build an embassy for the Elohim that incorporates a landing pad for their spaceship. Raëlians engage in daily meditation, hope for physical immortality through human cloning, and promote a liberal ethical system with a strong emphasis on sexual experimentation.

Raël first published his claims to have been contacted by the Elohim in his 1974 book Le Livre Qui Dit La Verité (The Book that Tells the Truth). He subsequently established an organisation devoted to promoting his ideas, MADECH, which disbanded in 1976 and was replaced by the Raëlian Church. Raël headed the new organisation, which was structured around a hierarchy of seven levels. Attracting more followers, the group obtained a country estate in France before relocating its operations to Quebec. In 1998, Raël established the Order of Angels, an internal all-female group whose members are largely sequestered from wider society and tasked with training themselves to become the Elohim's consorts. In 1997 Raël initiated Clonaid, an organisation engaged in research in human cloning directed by senior Raëlian Brigitte Boisselier. In 2002, the company claimed to have produced a human clone, a baby named Eve, bringing much critical scrutiny and media attention. The Movement has attracted further attention through its public protests endorsing causes such as women's and gay rights and against nuclear testing.

The International Raëlian Movement claims tens of thousands of members, the majority in Francophone areas of Western Europe and North America and parts of East Asia. Criticism of the philosophy has come from journalists, ex-Raëlians, and anti-cultists, while it has also been studied by scholars of religion.

== Definition and classification ==
Raëlism is classified as a new religious movement by scholars of religion. It has also been described as a UFO religion, a UFO movement, and an ETI (extra-terrestrial intelligence) religion. The organization that promotes Raëlianism is the International Raëlian Movement (IRM), which is also called the Raëlian Church. In France, where the religion originated, the government's Parliamentary Commission on Cults labels it as a "secte", a French term that is equivalent to the English word "cult". In 1997, a parliamentary inquiry commission issued a report through the Belgian Chamber of Representatives which likewise categorized the Belgian Raëlian Movement (Mouvement Raëlien Belge) as a secte.

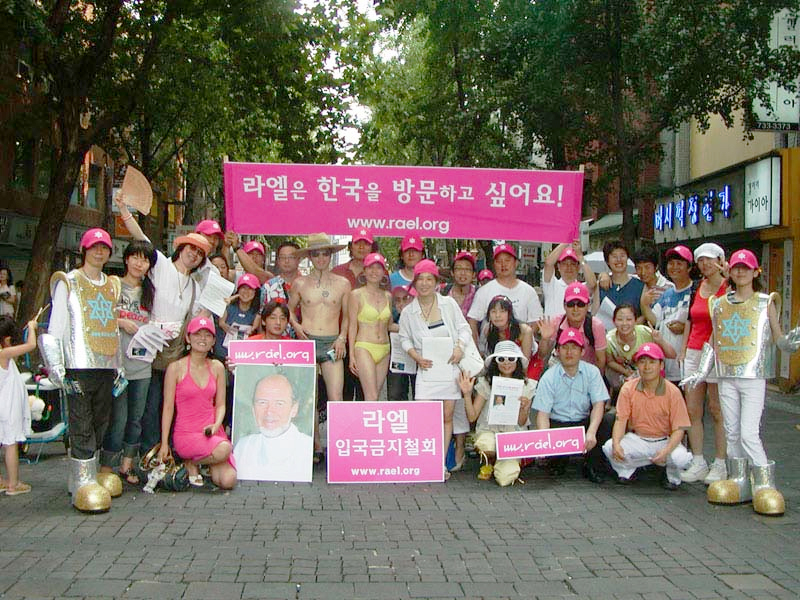
A public gathering of Raëlians in 2006 in the Insa-dong neighbourhood of Seoul, South Korea, protesting their government's 2003 ban on Raël entering the country

Raëlism is among the largest UFO religions in existence, and in the mid-2000s, the scholar of religion Andreas Grünschloß called it "one of the most consolidated UFO groups internationally active today". In its beliefs, Raëlism differs from many other UFO-based philosophies, with the scholar of religion James R. Lewis terming it "the most thoroughly secular of all the UFO religions". Most other UFO religions, such as the Aetherius Society, Ashtar Command, and Heaven's Gate, use many of the beliefs of the late-19th-century religion Theosophy; Raëlism does not. Raëlists have also been characterized as having a "belief in ufology", but Raëlians often stress that they do not regard themselves as ufologists.

Raëlism is materialistic and rejects the existence of the supernatural, endorsing atheism and rejecting the idea that gods exist. The religion's founder, Raël, characterizes traditional religion as irrational and unscientific, presenting his alternative as a philosophy free from "obscurantism and mysticism". Raëlians call their belief system a "scientific religion", with the International Raëlian Movement using the motto "Science is our religion; religion is our science". The religion emphasizes the use of science to solve the world's problems, and practitioners regard Raël as a pioneer of science who will one day be regarded as a peer of Galileo and Copernicus. Many of its members call it an "atheistic religion", and compare it to Buddhism, some branches of which similarly do not promote belief in gods (especially Theravāda Buddhism).

Along with science, the other main basis of Raël's ideas is the Bible. Noting the "central role" of the Bible in Raëlism, the scholar of religion Eugene V. Gallagher suggested that it was a "thoroughly biblical and thoroughly Christian" philosophy. Similarly, the sociologist of religion Susan J. Palmer characterised Raëlism as both fundamentalist and Abrahamic in its reliance on the Bible. Raël nevertheless criticised Christianity for what he believed was its role in perverting the Bible's message, presenting himself as an opponent of the Roman Catholic Church. Raëlism is not inclusive of other religions, with new members expected to formally renounce any previous religious affiliations.

== Beliefs ==
During the early 2000s, the scholar of religion George D. Chryssides said that Raëlism exhibits "a coherent worldview", but added that the movement remained in the "very early developmental stage". The religion is based on the teachings of Raël. Raël's claims are taken literally by practitioners of Raëlism, who regard his writings as scripture. From Palmer's extensive study of the philosophy and Raël himself, she thought that he genuinely believed his claims. The sociologist of religion Christopher Partridge noted that Raëlianism exhibits "a strong physicalist belief system".

Raëlism presents a form of the ancient astronauts theory which was well known at the time that the religion was formed. Several French authors, such as Jean Sendy, Serge Hutin, and Jacques Bergier, had already published books during the late 1960s and early 1970s stating that Earth was the outpost of an ancient extraterrestrial society. Swiss writer Erich von Däniken presented the same idea in his 1968 book Chariots of the Gods? Similar ideas had also been put forward in science fiction, such as the U.S. television series Star Trek. Raëlians often deny the effect of von Däniken on the philosophy, instead believing that it derives entirely from Raël's revelations.

=== The Elohim ===
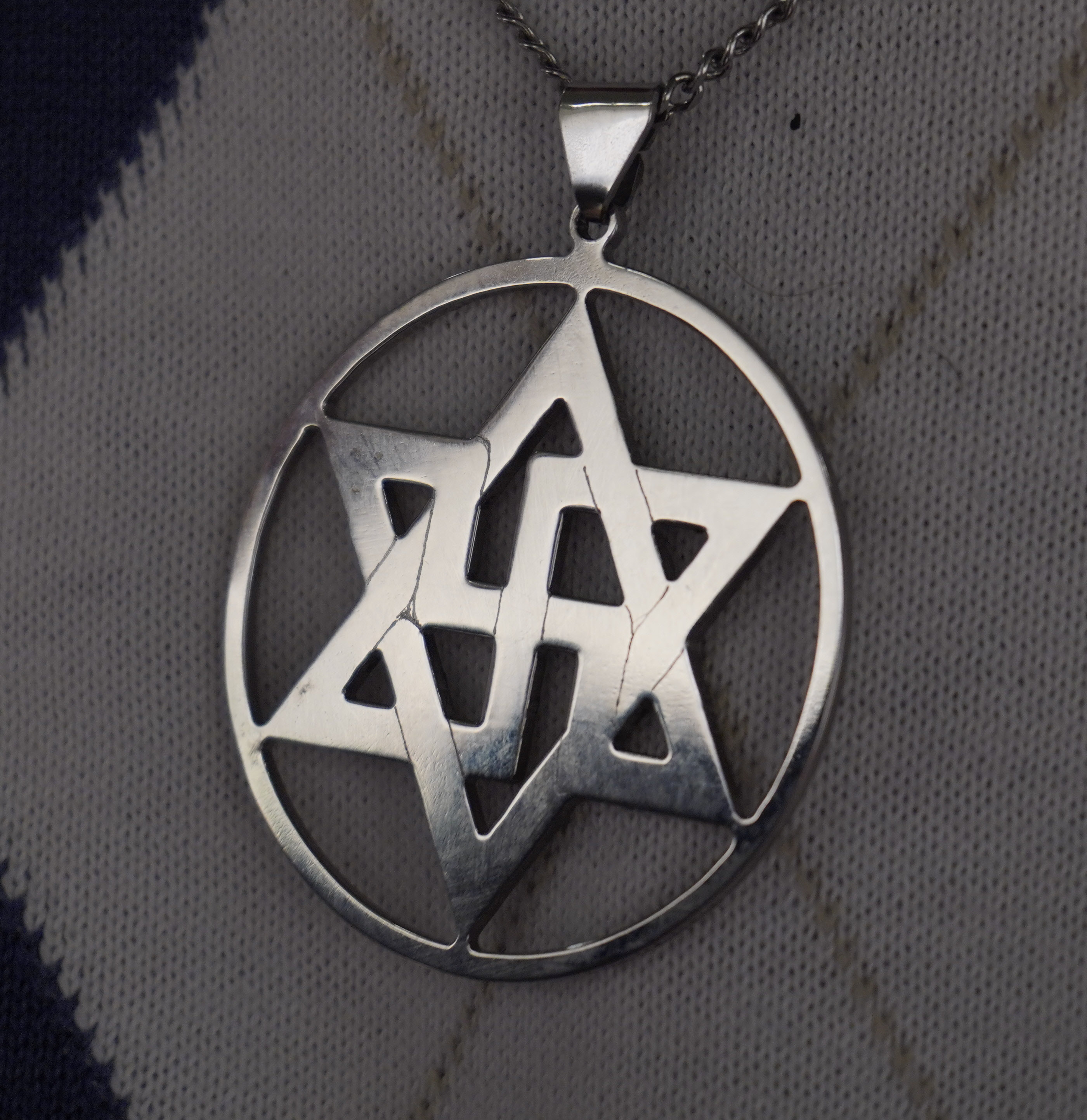
A medallion displaying the Raëlian symbol; practitioners typically wear these medallions to identify their beliefs

Raëlism teaches that there exists an extraterrestrial species known as the Elohim. Raël has said that the word "Elohim", which is used for God in the Old Testament, is actually a plural term which he translates as "those who came from the sky". Raël calls individual members of the Elohim "Eloha". He claims that the Elohim gave him the honorific name "Raël", a term deriving from "Israel", which he translates as "the messenger of those who come from the sky".

In his first book, Le Livre Qui Dit La Verité, published in 1974, Raël claimed that he initially encountered these alien beings on 13 December 1973, when he was 27 years old. He wrote that he was walking along the Puy de Lassolas volcanic crater in the Clermont-Ferrand mountains when one of their spaceships appeared and an Eloha emerged, who asked him to return the next day and bring a Bible. Raël did so, and over six days the Eloha explained to him the true meaning of its contents, revealing more about the Elohim's involvement in human history. In his 1976 book Les Extra-Terrestres M'ont Emmené sur Leur Planète (The Extraterrestrials Took Me to Their Planet), Raël added that he was contacted by the Elohim again on 7 October 1975, when they took him aboard their spaceship and transported him to their home planet. Here he was offered six biological robot women with which to have sex, saw the Elohim create his clone, and taught the techniques of sensual meditation. The scholar of religion James R. Lewis noted that Raël's account of encountering the Elohim was similar to those of the "classic UFO contactees" of the 1950s and 1960s.

The Elohim are described as physically smaller than humans, with pale green skin and almond-shaped eyes, and they divide into seven different races. Raëlians are forbidden from painting or sketching them. According to Raël, their planet is outside the Solar System but within the Milky Way. Raël states that there are 90,000 Elohim on their planet, and that they are all quasi-immortal, and that they do not wear clothes. All of them are permitted to engage in free love with one another, and sexual jealousy has been eliminated. All of them are regarded as feminine in manner; Raël states that "the most feminine woman on Earth is only 10% as feminine as the Elohim.". They are not allowed to procreate, and many of them undergo a sterilisation operation to ensure this. Raël also reports that the Elohim can communicate with humans because they understand all human languages.

=== The Elohim on Earth ===
Raëlism teaches that around 25,000 years ago, the Elohim arrived at Earth, and then transformed it so that life could develop thereon. It states that the Elohim used their advanced technology to establish all life on the planet. Raël characterises humans as "biological robots" that have been created and programmed by the Elohim. Raëlism teaches that humankind is modelled physically on the Elohim; for practitioners, this is indicated by the passage at Genesis 1:26. Also representing his own interpretation of Genesis, Raël teaches that the Elohim scientist responsible for creating humankind was named Yahweh, and that the first two humans to be created were named Adam and Eve. Raëlians believe that there were originally seven human races, modelling the seven Elohim races, but that the purple, blue, and green races have died out. In believing that the human species was created by the Elohim, Raëlians reject Darwinian evolution, and espouse creationism and intelligent design; Raëlians term their beliefs "scientific creationism". Raëlians believe that the Elohim were also created by an earlier species, and they before them, ad infinitum. They believe that the cosmos expands indefinitely, both in time and in space; infinity is an important concept for them.

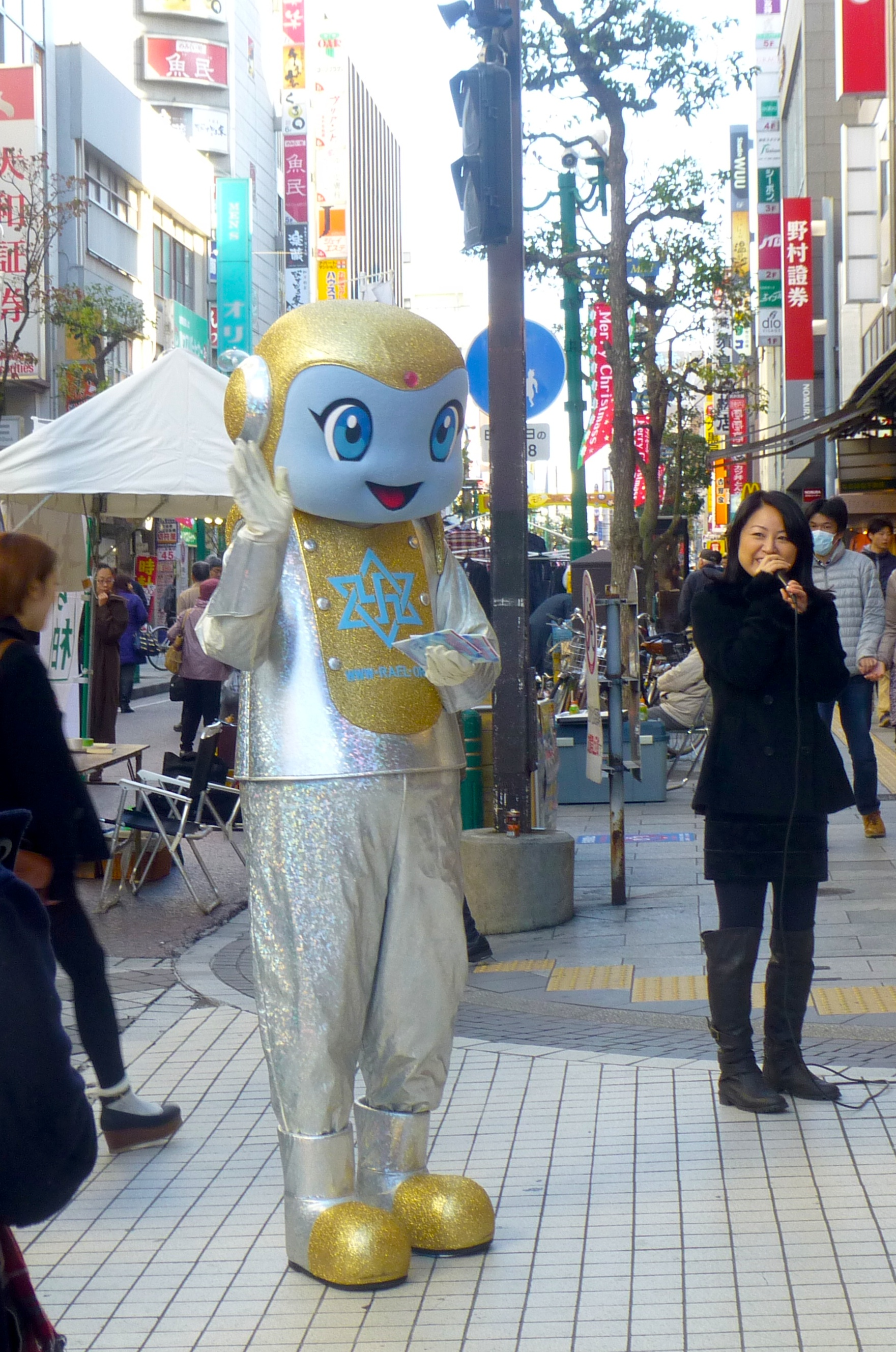
Raëlians promoting their religion on a street in Japan; one is dressed as an alien character mascot.

Raëlians believe that accounts of gods in various mythologies around the world are misinterpretations of memories about the Elohim. The philosophy states that the sacred scriptures of many other religions describe the ongoing activities of the Elohim on Earth. For example, the tale of Adam and Eve's expulsion from the Garden of Eden, recounted in Genesis, is interpreted as representing humans' difficult transition from the Elohim's laboratories to life on Earth, where they had to become self-sufficient. The resurrection of Jesus of Nazareth, as presented in the Gospels, is described as representing how the Elohim cloned Jesus to restore him to life after death. References to Satan are interpreted as referring to the chief of a group on the Elohim's planet who were opposed to genetic experiments on Earth, and who argued that all humans should be killed as a potential threat. According to the Raëlians, the Great Flood narrative recounts an attempt by the anti-human aliens to wipe-out all humans, but that some humans were rescued by an alien spacecraft which provided the basis for the story of Noah's Ark.

Various figures who established or inspired religions throughout human history, including Jesus, the Buddha, Muhammad, and Joseph Smith, are portrayed by the Raëlians as having been guided by the Elohim. These are characterised as being 39 prophets sent to humankind at various times. Each of them is believed to have revealed information to humankind that they could comprehend at the given time, and Raëlism, therefore, emphasises the idea of progressive truth. Raël claims that he is the fortieth and final prophet of the Elohim, sent because the human species is now sufficiently developed to understand the truth about the Elohim. He initially claimed that he was chosen for this role because he had a Roman Catholic mother and a Jewish father, and was thus "an ideal link between two very important peoples in the history of the world". He added that he was also selected because he lived in France, which the Elohim considered a more open-minded country than most others.

Raël subsequently stated that these prophets are themselves the result of a human mother breeding with an Eloha father, with the human mothers having been chosen for the purity of their genetic code, beamed onto an Elohim spacecraft, impregnated, and then returned to Earth with their memory of the event erased. In his 1979 book, Let's Welcome Our Fathers from Space, Raël added that he was the biological son of the Eloha who he first encountered, Yahweh. He noted that Yahweh was also the father of Jesus, making the latter Raël's half-brother. In 2003, Raël publicly identified himself as Maitreya, the prophesied future bodhisattva of Mahayana Buddhism. He maintains that he continues to be in telepathic contact with the Elohim, hearing Yahweh's voice guiding him in making decisions that affect Raëlianism.

The religion also teaches that the Elohim continue to monitor every human individual on Earth, remotely, from their planet. This is done so that the Elohim can decide which individuals merit being offered the opportunity of eternal life. It argues that the Elohim continue to visit Earth, as evidenced by crop circles, which adherents regard as the landing spaces of the Elohim's spacecraft. Raëlians generally understand sightings of unidentified flying objects (UFOs) as confirmation of their belief in the Elohim, although their opinion of Ufology is ambiguous. Raëlians also consider the appearance of "angel hair" as evidence of the Elohim's presence, stating that it has appeared at various Raëlian summer gatherings. They typically express scepticism regarding claims by alleged alien contactees other than Raël. Raëlians believe that they are all capable of linking telepathically with the Elohim, but that only Raël is permitted to meet with them physically or receive their revelations.

=== The Age of Apocalypse and the Elohim's Return ===
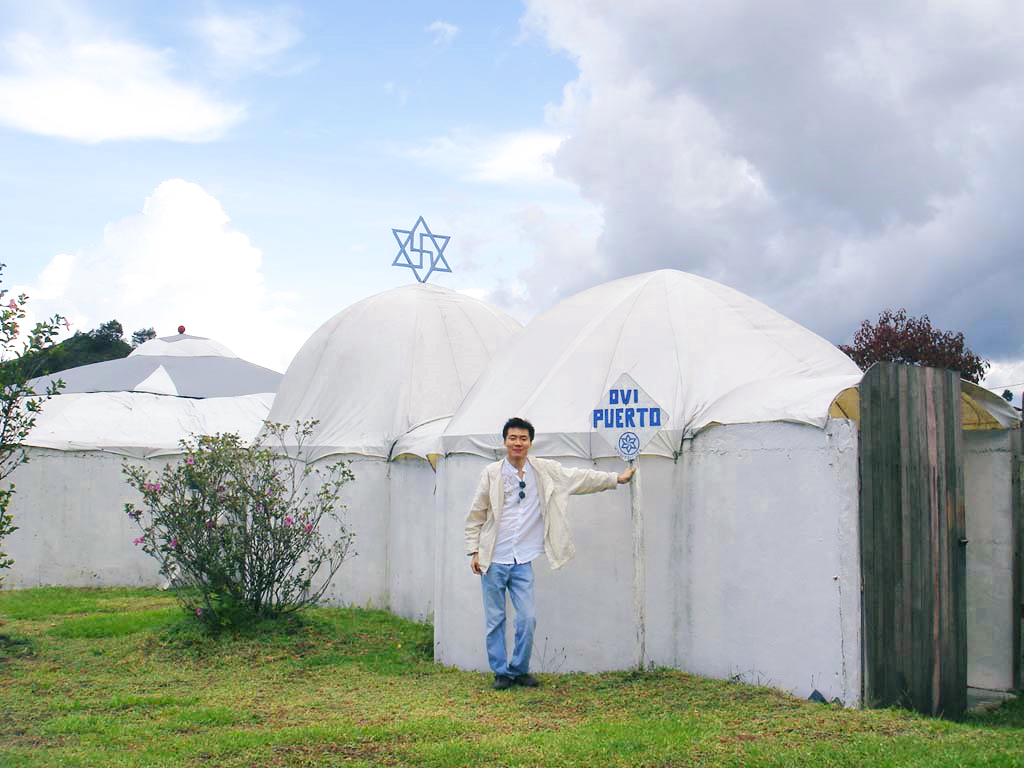
A small-scale tent copy of the proposed Elohim embassy erected at a Raëlian seminar in Colombia

Raëlism is a millenarian philosophy. Raël claims that since the U.S. military's use of the nuclear bomb on Hiroshima in 1945, humans have been living in the "Age of Apocalypse" or "Revelation". Raëlian doctrine states that the human species must now choose whether to use science and technology to enhance life, or to use it to bring about nuclear annihilation. It claims that if humans successfully get through this present age, they will live in an era of advanced technology, in which society will be tolerant and sexually liberated. Raël claimed that he was destined to help lead the human species away from its path of destruction.

According to Raël, beginning a peaceful age will cause the return of the Elohim to Earth. He added that those Elohim will bring with them the 39 immortal prophets who they had previously sent to guide humankind. Raël stated that humans must build an embassy for the Elohim prior to their arrival on Earth, and that it must include a landing pad for their spaceship. He stated that it needed to be located on internationally recognised neutral territory, so as not to indicate favour towards any one particular nation-state. Initially, Raël sought permission to build it in Israel, explaining this by reference to how the ancient Israelites were once in contact with the Elohim. He also stated that this embassy would constitute the "Third Temple" referred to in Jewish prophecy.

Receiving little help for this venture from the Israeli government, Raël instead suggested that a neighbouring country might be suitable, proposing Jordan, Syria, Lebanon, and Egypt as possible locations. None of the governments of these countries were favorable. Senior people of the Raëlian Movement suggested Hawaii as a possible alternative, and in 1998, Raël stated that he had received a new revelation from the Elohim, which stated that this location would be acceptable. Chryssides noted that, should the Elohim not arrive in 2035, the Raëlians will have to adapt to the new circumstance in which their eschatology remains unfulfilled. On 16 April 1987, the Chicago Sun-Times estimated the funding for the "cosmic kibbutz" at $1 million. In 1997–1998, the funding had risen to $7 million. In 2001, group members claimed that they had saved $9 million for the embassy, and in October 2001, the funding had reached $20 million.

Once on Earth, Raël claims, the Elohim will share their advanced technology and scientific understanding with humans, and will help to usher-in a utopia. Raël teaches that the Elohim's arrival will herald a new and improved political system on Earth. This will be a single world government that Raël terms a "geniocracy", or "rule of geniuses", and which he discusses in his fifth book, Geniocracy. According to this system, only those few people who are at least fifty percent more intelligent than the average person will be permitted to rule. Raël's proposed geniocratic system bears similarities with the style of governance that Plato promoted in his work Republic. Raëlians thus reject democracy, believing that it fails to ensure that society has the best leadership. Raël claims that this future society will have no war, and that crime will have been ended via genetic engineering. In this future, Raël states, humans will be able to travel beyond Earth, to colonise other planets. Raël claims that robots will assume menial tasks, allowing humans to devote their time to pleasurable pursuits. He also argued that there would be biological robots which would serve as sex-slaves, akin to those which Raël states that he encountered on his visit to the Elohim planet. A single world currency will be introduced, as a prelude to the total abolition of money, while a unified world calendar will also be adopted.

=== Cloning and survival after death ===
Raëlians reject the existence of the ethereal soul that survives physical death, and instead argue that the only hope for immortality is through scientific means. The Raëlians claim that the Elohim will clone and thus recreate dead individuals, but only those particular individuals who they deem merit this recreation. In this, they believe in a "conditional immortality", with immortality for a minority and oblivion for the majority. The resurrection of Jesus, as recounted in the Gospels, is for instance explained as an example of Elohim cloning.

Raëlists advocate for the development of human cloning technology on Earth. Raëlians also believe that deceased individuals can be cloned so that they could be tried and punished for their crimes. After the September 11th, 2001 terrorist attacks in the United States, in which the attackers killed themselves, the Raëlists proposed that they could be resurrected through cloning to be tried for their actions. Due to its emphasis upon attaining immortality, Raëlism deplores suicide; after the Heaven's Gate group engaged in a mass suicide in 1997, the Raëlian Church was among the new religions that issued press releases condemning suicide.

As opposed to the scientific definition of reproductive cloning, which is simply the creation of a genetically identical living organism, Raëlians seek to both genetically clone individuals, rapidly accelerate growth of the clone to adulthood through a process like guided self-assembly of rapidly expanded cells or even nanotechnology. Raël told lawmakers that banning the development of human cloning was comparable to outlawing medical advances such as "antibiotics, blood transfusions, and vaccines".

=== Morality, ethics, and gender roles ===
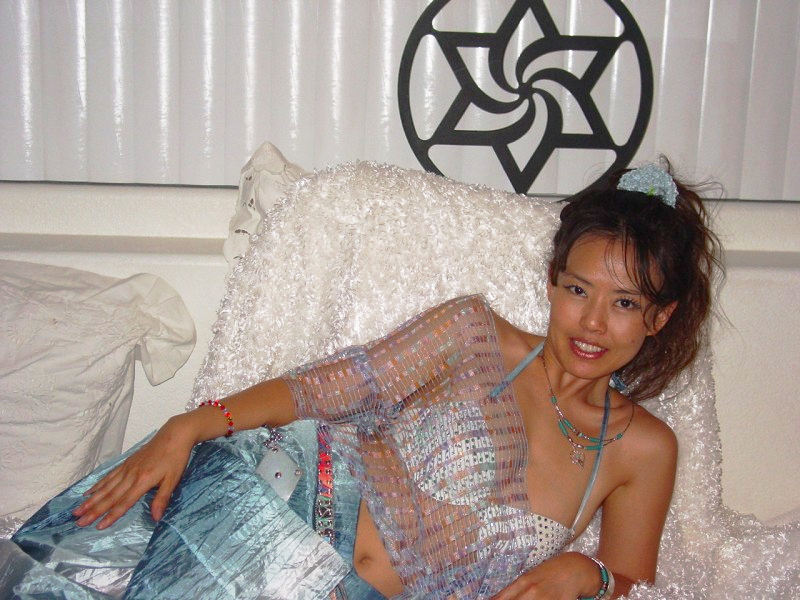
A woman on a bed adorned with the Raëlian symbol

Raëlism insists on a strict ethical code for its followers. Members are expected to take responsibility for their own actions, respect cultural and racial difference, promote non-violence, strive for world peace, and share wealth and resources. They are also encouraged to uphold democracy, in the belief that humankind will ultimately make a democratic choice to introduce geniocracy. The Raëlian opinion is that everything should be permitted so long as it harms no one and does not impede scientific and technological advance. Members are nevertheless advised against using recreational drugs or stimulants so as not to harm their health, although some practitioners have acknowledged that they use alcohol and cigarettes.

John M. Bozeman characterized the religion's morality as "progressive", while Palmer referred to the group's "liberal social values", and Chryssides called Raëlist values "worldly and hedonistic". The scholar of religion Paul Oliver said that the philosophy's ethics are "relativistic" in that practitioners are encouraged to act in a manner that they feel appropriate to the context. Several scholars have also argued that it is a "world-affirming" religion, using the typology established by Roy Wallis.

Raël considered gender as an artificial construct and emphasized its fluidity. Raël avoided a macho persona and is instead often described by his followers as being "gentle" and "feminine". Palmer suggested that Raël regarded women as being superior to men because they were described as being more like the Elohim. In Raël's account, the inhabitants of the Elohim planet "have 10 percent of masculinity and 90 percent of femininity". Raël also proposed that if women were in positions of political power across the world, there would be no war. The Raëlians have participated with public protests for women's rights. At its June 2003 "Joy of Being Woman" demonstration, Raëlian women danced naked through the streets of Paris. Palmer described the Raëlians as feminists, although Raël criticized mainstream feminism, arguing that it "copied the shortcomings of men". Generally adopting the belief that the human body is malleable, Raëlism has a positive opinion of plastic surgery to improve physical appearance.

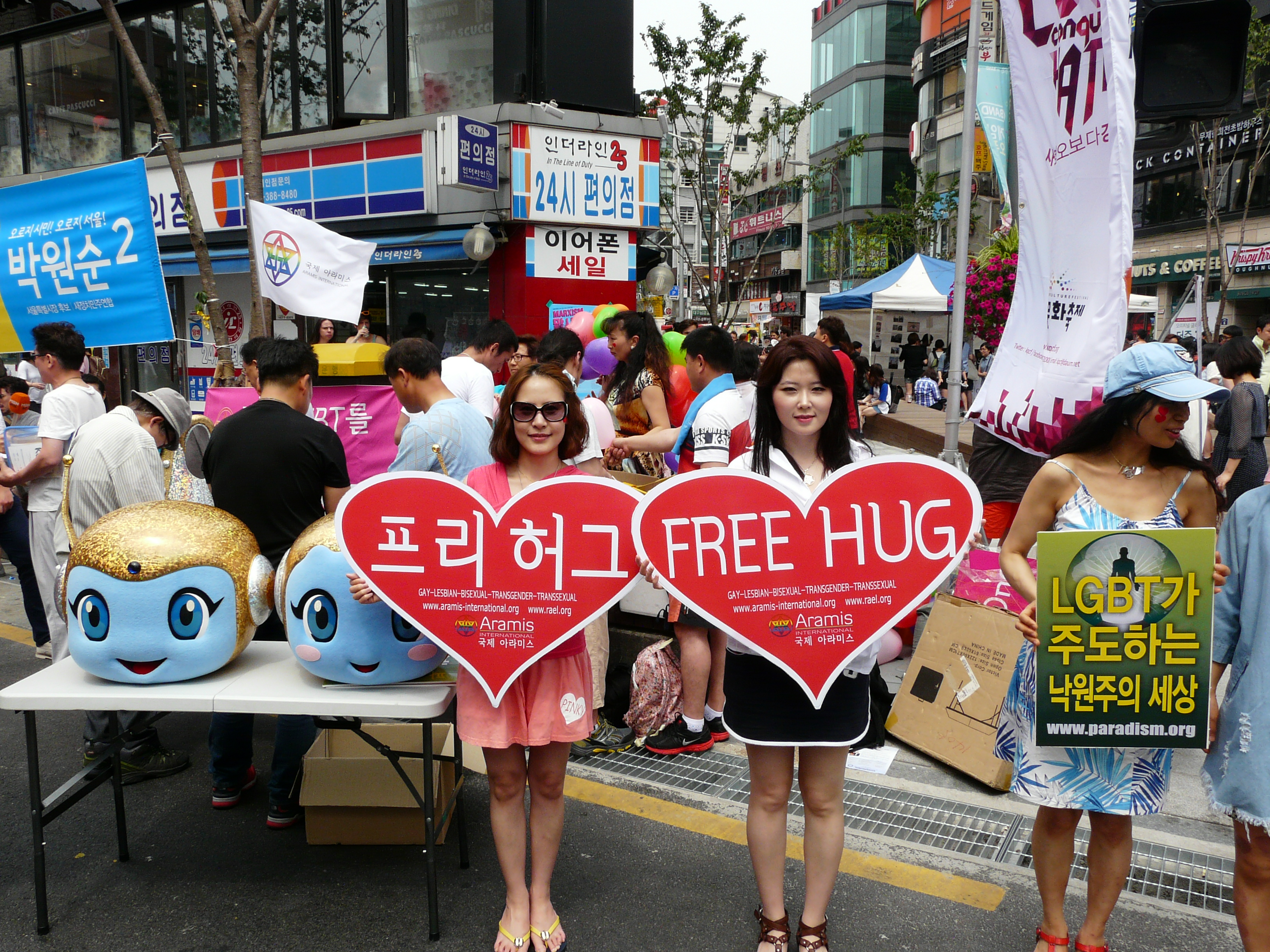
A Raëlist contingent on the street at the "Korea Queer Culture Festival" held in Seoul in 2014

Raëlism teaches that the Elohim created humans to feel sexual desire as a panacea for their violent impulses. It states that through the pursuit of sexual pleasure, new pathways between the neurons in the brain are forged, thus enhancing an individual's intelligence. Raëlism encourages its members to explore their sexuality; while Raël is often photographed with beautiful women and appears to be heterosexual, he encourages homosexual experimentation. Adopting an accepting attitude towards different forms of sexual orientation and expression, Raëlism teaches that differences in sexual orientation are rooted in the Elohim's primordial genetic programming and are something to be celebrated. Researching about the Raëlians of Quebec, Palmer found that many of them avoided categorizing themselves by using terms like "heterosexual", "homosexual", or "bisexual", finding those labels to be too limiting.

The Raëlians have stressed the need for respect and mutual consent in sexual behaviour. The group places a strong taboo on incest, rape, and sexual activities involving children. Anyone involved in the Movement who is found to have been involved in these latter activities is excommunicated, while Raël has recommended that paedophiles be castrated or placed in mental institutions. Those believed to have forced unwelcome sexual attention upon another person are excommunicated from the Movement for seven years– the amount of time Raëlians believe it takes for all of a person's biological cells to be regenerated.

The Raëlists reject both enforced monogamy and marriage, regarding these as institutions that have been enforced to enslave women and suppress sexual expression. The religion discourages its members from marrying. Members are also discouraged from contributing to global overpopulation; members are urged not to have more than two children, and ideally none at all. Raël states that should two individuals wish to procreate, their psychic control during the act of conception can affect any child resulting. The Raëlists also believe that once human cloning has been developed, biological reproduction will be obsolete. As well as endorsing the use of birth control and contraceptives, Raëlists endorse the use of abortion to terminate unwanted pregnancies. Raël has also argued that if a woman does not want a child who has been born then she should give it up to be raised by society.

Some Swiss government authorities responded to Raëlians' opinions about Sensual Meditation with a fear that Raëlians are a threat to public morals for supporting liberalized sex education for children. They argue that such liberalized sex education that teaches children how to obtain sexual gratification would encourage sexual abuse of underage children.

=== Religious symbol ===
The two variants of the Raëlian logo; the former uses the swastika in the centre and the latter a swirl representing the shape of a galaxy. The latter was adopted to avoid the connotations of Nazism that the swastika has in Western countries and was used between 1991 and 2007.

The symbol initially used to signify Raëlism was a six-pointed star with a swastika in the centre. Raël stated that this was the symbol he originally saw on the hull of the Elohim's spaceship. Raëlians regard this as a symbol of infinity. Practitioners also believe that this symbol helps facilitate their own telepathic contact with the Elohim. Raëlists typically wear a medallion of the symbol around their neck.

The Raëlian use of the swastika, a symbol that had been prominently used by Germany's Nazi Party during the 1930s and 1940s, resulted in accusations from the Montreal anti-cult organization Info-Cult that the Raëlians promoted fascism and racism. Outside Info-Cult's office, Raëlians spoke against the act of discriminating against a religious minority. On 2 January 1992, a dozen people protested against the use of the swastika in the Raëlian logo in Miami's Eden Roc Hotel. The use of the swastika and other Raëlian practices has resulted in criticism from the group Hineni of Florida, an Orthodox Jewish organization.

In 1992, the Raëlian Movement altered their symbol, replacing the central swastika with a swirling shape. They explained that this was due to a request from the Elohim to change the symbol in order to help in negotiations with Israel for the building of the Extraterrestrial Embassy, although the country continued to deny their request. Raël also stated that the change was made to show respect to the victims of the Holocaust. The newly added swirling shape was explained as a depiction of a swirling galaxy. In 2005, the Israeli Raëlian Guide Kobi Drori stated that the Lebanese government was discussing proposals by the Raëlian movement to build their interplanetary embassy in Lebanon. However, one condition was that the Raëlians not display their logo on top of the building because it mixes a swastika and a Star of David. According to Drori, the Raëlians involved refused this offer, as they wished to keep the symbol as it was. From 1991 to 2007, the official Raëlian symbol in Europe and America did not have the original swastika, but Raël decided to make the original symbol, the Star of David intertwined with a swastika, the only official symbol of the Raëlian Movement worldwide.

== Practices ==
Raëlism involves a series of monthly meetings, initiations, and meditation rituals. Where possible, Raëlians congregate with fellow practitioners on the third Sunday of the month. It is the group's policy that these events occur in rented rooms rather than property that the Raëlian Movement itself has purchased. At the monthly meetings in Montreal, Raël himself often appeared.

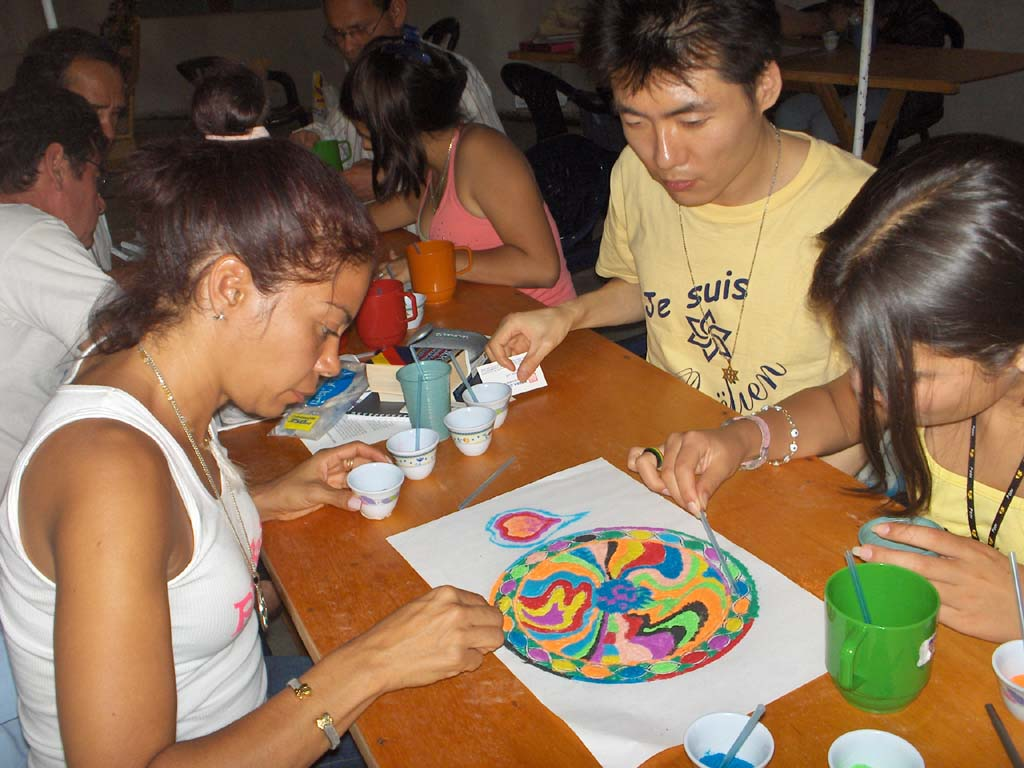
Raëlians drawing with sand.

The main ritual in Raëlism is the "transmission of the cellular plan", in which a Raëlian Guide places their hands upon another individual's head, through which the Guide is believed to receive the individual's cellular code and then telepathically transmit it to the Elohim. Doing so denotes the initiate's formal recognition of the Elohim as the creators of humankind. This is used as part of the "baptism", or initiation ceremony for new members joining the Movement. Those in the Movement who hold the rank of bishop and priest are permitted to conduct these initiation ceremonies. In some instances, when the necessary individuals are present, Raël touches the head of a Raëlian bishop, who in turn touches that of a Raëlian priest, who touches the head of the initiate to ensure the "transmission". These "transmissions" are permitted to take place on one of four days in the year that play a prominent role in the Raëlian calendar. The first examples took place in April 1976, when Raël carried out the "transmission" ceremonies of forty initiates on the Roc Plat.

The Raëlian calendar begins with the nuclear bombing of Hiroshima on August 6, 1945. Each year after this date is referred to as "AH" or "après Hiroshima" ("after Hiroshima"). The Raëlians celebrate four religious festivals each year, two of which mark Raël's claimed encounters with the Elohim. These are the first Sunday in April, which is the date on which Raëlians believe the Elohim created the first humans; August 6th, which marks the day of the nuclear bombing of Hiroshima in 1945; October 7th, which is the day in which Raël claims that he encountered the Elohim for the second time, in 1974; and December 13th, which is the day that Raël allegedly first encountered the Elohim in 1973.

=== Sensual meditation ===
A major practice in Raëlism is "sensual meditation", something that Raël outlined in his 1980 book La méditation sensuelle. Raëlians are encouraged to take part in this guided meditation or visualisation on a daily basis, with the intent of transmitting love and telepathic links to the Elohim and achieving harmony with infinity. In this, practitioners are often assisted in this meditation through listening to an instruction tape. Sensual meditation sessions also take place communally at the group's monthly meetings, during which the assembled adherents sit or lie on the floor in a dimly lit room. They are then guided through it by a Raëlian Guide speaking through a microphone; the meditation may be accompanied by New Age music.

Sensual meditation begins with a relaxation exercise known as harmonisation avec l'infini ("harmonization with the infinite"). One stage of this process is "oxygenation", which entails deep breathing. Practitioners are taught to relax and then envision themselves expanding their frame of reference until the self becomes only a tiny speck within the universe. They are then tasked with visualising the bones and organs of the body, and ultimately the atoms within the body itself. The guided meditation then encourages the meditators to imagine themselves being on the Elohim's planet and communicating telepathically with these aliens.

Palmer found that Raëlians varyingly described a sense of physical well-being, psychic abilities, or sexual arousal during these meditations and interpreted these as evidence that they were in telepathic contact with the Elohim. The goal of sensual meditation is to achieve a "cosmic orgasm", which is characterised as the ultimate experience a person can have. Palmer quoted one senior Raëlian as describing the "cosmic orgasm" as "the sensual experience of the unity between the self and the universe".

=== Seminars ===
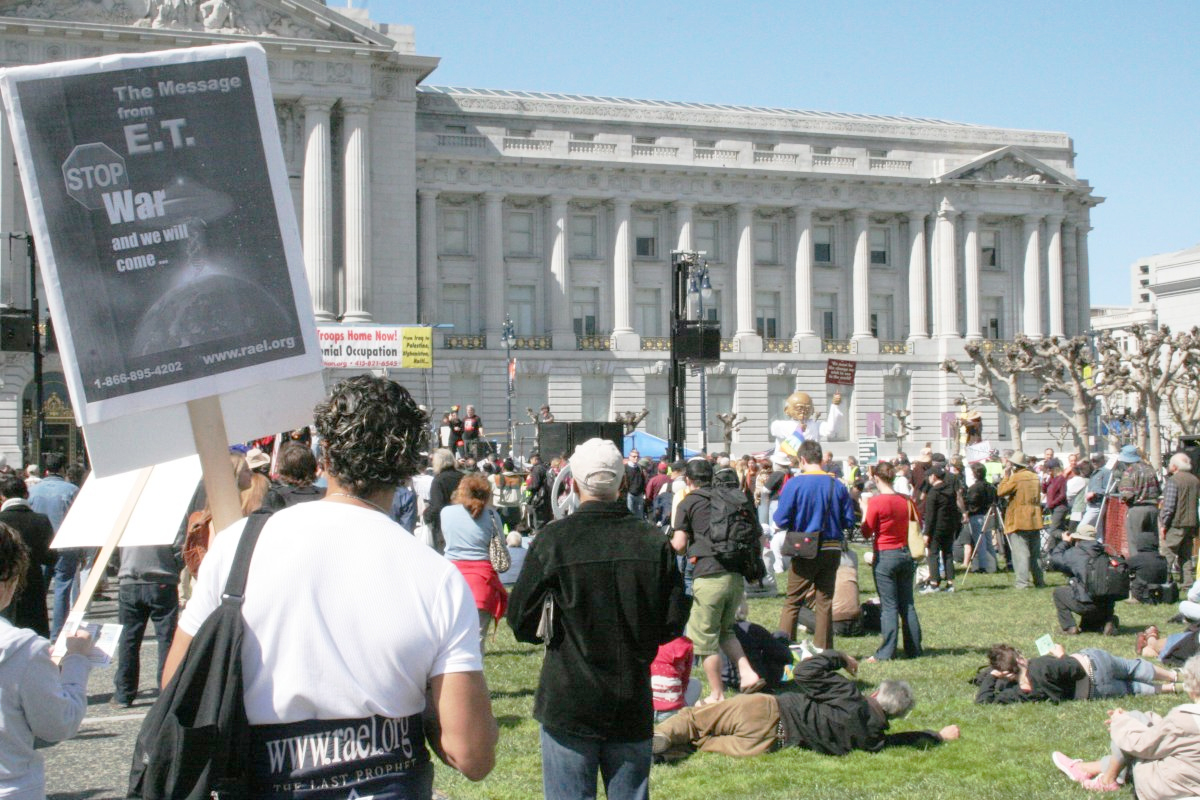
A Raëlian protest sign is raised at a political rally which demands the return of U.S. troops from foreign military engagements.

The Raëlian Church holds week-long summer seminars called "Stages of Awakening". These involve daily lectures by Raël, sensual meditation sessions, periods of fasting and feasting, testimonials, and various alternative therapies. Activities that have attracted press attention have included dressing in the clothes of the opposite gender as part of an exercise to play with the fluidity of gender expression, and observing one's own genitals and masturbating.

Raëlians use these seminars as an opportunity to form friendships or sexual relationships. Attendees wear white togas with name tags. In 1991, a French journalist attended a seminar, and taped couples having sexual intercourse in tents, something which was then much-publicized. Following these seminars, a second seminar, this time restricted to members of the Structure, takes place.

== History ==
=== Origins ===
Claude Vorilhon was born in Ambert, France, on 30 September 1946. He was the illegitimate son of a 15-year-old mother; his father had been a Sephardi Jew who was then in hiding from the Nazi authorities. Vorilhon later recounted being raised as an atheist by his grandmother and aunt, although for a time he attended a Roman Catholic boarding school. As a teenager, Vorilhon hitch-hiked to Paris, where he pursued a career as a singer, releasing singles under the name "Claude Celler". He then married a nurse, and had two children with her. In 1973, he founded the racing car magazine Auto Pop, and also worked as a test-driver for such vehicles. In November of 1973, a new law was introduced in France which banned speeding on the highway, ending his work as a test driver. Auto Pop ceased publication in September 1974.

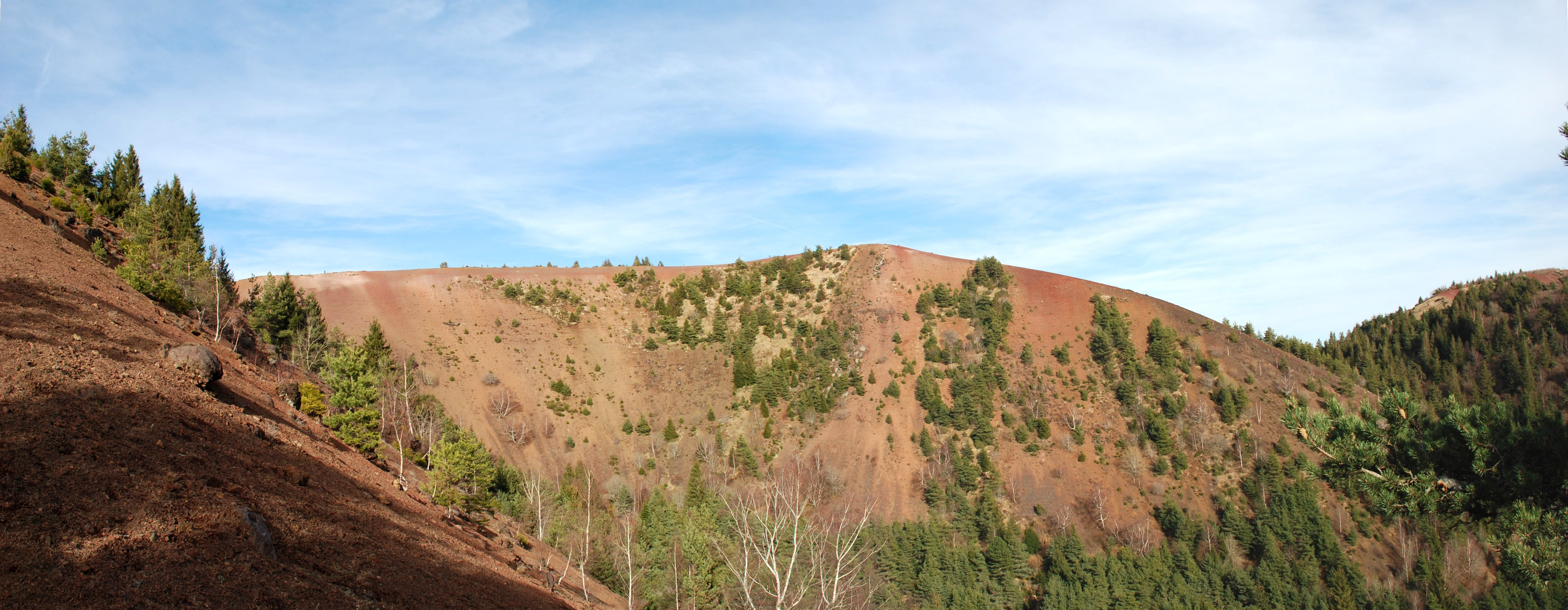
The Puy Lassolas, the mountain where Raël claimed he first encountered the Elohim in 1973

There had been a range of reported UFO sightings in the 1970s in France, and the ancient astronaut theory was "very much in vogue" in the country by the middle of that decade. In early 1974, Vorilhon announced that in December of 1973, he had been contacted by the Elohim while walking along the Puy Lassolas mountain. He began promoting these ideas in interviews on French television and radio. He began lecturing on his alleged experiences in Paris, where he attracted a group of followers, many of which were science-fiction fans or amateur ufologists. In December of 1974, an organisation based upon his ideas, called the Mouvement pour l'accueil des Elohims créateurs de l'humanité (MADECH; "Movement for the Welcoming of the Elohim, Creators of Humanity"), was launched. Vorilhon began referring to himself as "Raël". A newsletter, called Apocalypse, began publication in October of 1974. MADECH began raising money for the self-publication of Vorilhon's first book, which appeared as Le livre qui dit la verité that year. Raëlians treat his first book with reverence, often referring to it simply as Le livre ("the book").

Some members of MADECH wanted the organisation to take a broader interest in Ufology beyond Raël's own claims, and also desired to restrict his authority within the group. Amid an internal power struggle, Raël called an emergency meeting in April 1975. The feud continued, and in July of that year, he dismissed MADECH's executives, and replaced them with seven of his own supporters. Raël also announced that he had been contacted by the Elohim for a second time, and that on this occasion, they had taken him to visit their planet. He outlined these claims in his 1975 book Les Extra-Terrestres M'ont Emmené sur Leur Planète. Opposition to Raël remained evident in MADECH, and in 1976, he disbanded the group, beginning the Raëlian Movement as a replacement in February 1976. It operated along a strict hierarchy, with Raël as its director, referred to as the "Guide of Guides". Unlike MADECH, it promoted a broader religious structure, including ritual practices. It continued publication of Apocalypse to spread its message.

In 1976, the Raëlians sent a mission to the Canadian province of Quebec, to attract converts in the Francophone region. The next year, a Quebecois branch of the Movement was established. Raël's first two books were then published in a single English edition, titled Space Aliens Took Me to Their Planet in 1978, and republished as The Message Given To Me By Extra-Terrestrials: They Took Me to their Planet in 1986, and in a new translation, as The Final Message in 1998. He expanded upon his ideas with several additional books: Accueiller Les Extra-Terrestes in 1979 (translated as Let's Welcome Our Fathers from Space in 1986), La Méditation Sensuelle in 1980 (translated as Sensual Meditation in 1986), and Geniocracy.

=== Later development ===
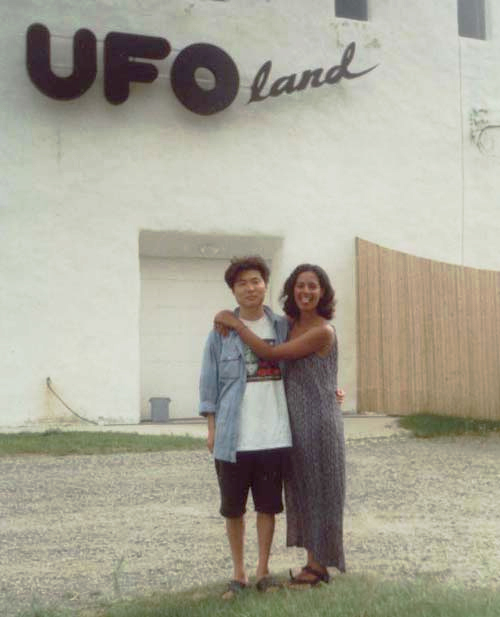
Two Raëlians visiting UFOLand, the Quebec museum which the Raëlians established in 1997

In 1980, the Raëlians sent a mission to Japan, followed by a mission to Africa in 1982, and then a mission to Australia in 1990. In the early 1980s, the Raëlian Movement bought a campground near Albi in southern France, which they named Eden. In 1984, Raël underwent a year's retreat in which he avoided public appearance. The following year, his first wife left both him and the movement; he subsequently began a relationship with a Japanese Raëlian, Lisa Sunagawa, for several years. During the mid-1990s, Raël returned to his hobby of motor racing, competing in rounds two and three of the 1995 Magna Enduro Racing Championship and the 1998 Motorola Cup in Miami before retiring from the sport in 2001. In 1992, a schism appeared in the religion as a group of about forty practitioners were expelled. They formed a rival, smaller group, the Apostles of the Last Days, espousing the belief that Raël had been the original spokesman of the Elohim but had been taken over by Satan.

In 1992, the Raëlian Movement bought 115 hectares near Valcourt in Quebec, naming this property Le Jardin du Prophète ("the Garden of the Prophet"). It was there in 1997 that the organisation opened UFOLand, a museum about ufology. Its purpose was to raise money for the Elohim Embassy, but in 2001 it closed to the public, having proved financially unviable. It was also during 1997, a month after Ian Wilmut announced the birth of Dolly the Sheep, a successful clone, that Raël established the company Valiant Venture to explore the commercial applications of cloning. Through it came Clonaid, of which the Raëlian Bishop Brigitte Boisselier was co-founder, director, and spokesperson. The initiation of this group and its promotion of human cloning incited much debate among other religious figures, scientists, and ethicists. Raël and Boisselier both spoke before US President Bill Clinton's Congress hearing on human cloning in March 2001.

At the July 1998 training camp in the Jardin du Prophète, Raël announced that in December 1997 he had received another revelation from the Elohim, commanding him to form a new grouping within the Raëlian Movement, the Order of Raël's Angels. This was to be a secret society, open only to women who would become the consorts of the Elohim after their arrival on Earth. A newsletter, Plumes d'Anges (Angel Feathers), was issued containing information about the Order. Palmer noted that by emphasizing the unique qualities of women, this group challenged the established Raëlian doctrine that men and women are wholly equal and interchangeable.

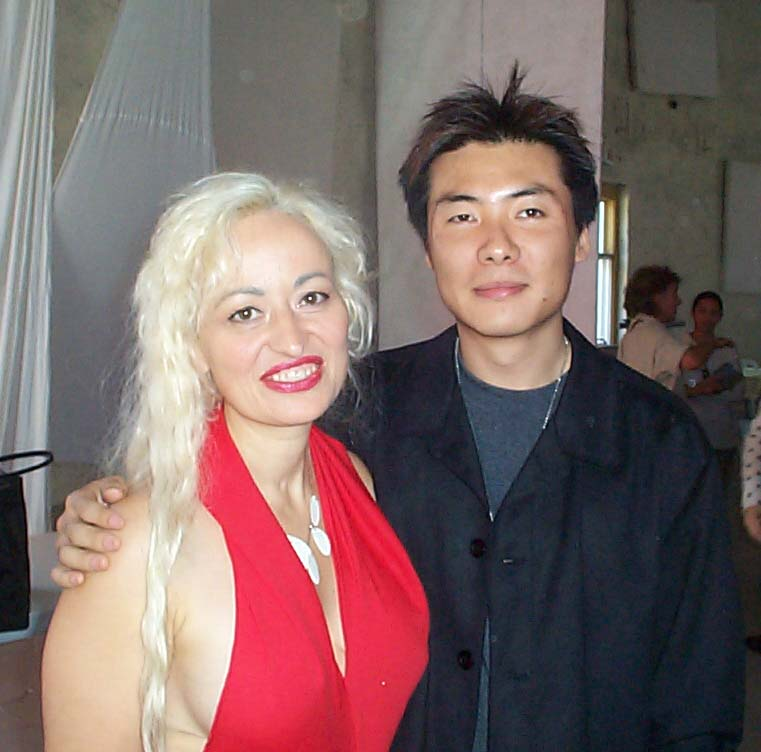
Brigitte Boisselier (left) took on a senior role in the Raëlian Movement.

In 2001, Raël toured Asia, giving seminars. That year he married for a second time, to a 16-year-old ballet student. Raëlism discourages marriage, and this instance was done for expediency, because he had been questioned by customs officials when traveling with her across borders. They subsequently divorced but remained a couple. In November 2002, a local man vandalised the group's Jardins des Prophètes property, causing significant damage. Raël stated that this had been a preliminary test of "The Abraham Project", which is a joint operation between the Central Intelligence Agency and the French intelligence agencies to assassinate him via using schizophrenic people who are directed via mind-control.

In December 2002, Boisselier announced that Clonaid's work had resulted in the birth of a baby, named Eve, which she claimed was the world's first human clone. The child was not presented for scrutiny by scientists; the IRM's allegations regarding Baby Eve were never substantiated by the scientific community. Many commentators believed the announcement had been a hoax. In January 2003 the Raëlians declared that Eve's parents had hidden themselves to evade attention. Baby Eve's appearance gained the Raëlians much international press coverage, and also much ridicule. The group claimed this publicity generated around 5000 new members. Boisselier announced periodically that further clone infants had been born, in the Netherlands, Japan, South Korea, and Australia, although the press increasingly deemed these hoaxes and stopped attending Raëlian press conferences.

In January 2003, Raël announced Boisselier as his appointed successor, and also published The Maitreya, in which he identified himself with the eponymous figure from Buddhist prophecy. In response to Raël's association with Clonaid, South Korean immigration authorities denied him entry to their country in 2003. The group then protested near South Korea's Ministry of Health and Welfare that ordered him to leave. Raël appeared alongside a group of women, "Raël's Girls", in the October 2004 issue of Playboy. In 2005, two amateur documentary makers, Abdullah Hashem and Joseph McGowen, attended and filmed a Raëlian seminar in Las Vegas, claiming that they were making a student film. They then used the footage as the basis of a documentary, which they presented as an exposé of the group. In 2009, the Church announced plans for a new UFOLand in Las Vegas.

== Organization and structure ==
The Raëlian Movement is a strictly hierarchical organization, in which there are two levels of membership. The majority of members are referred to simply as "Raëlians", whereas the members who are in the higher levels, which control the Movement, are referred to as "the structure".

=== Member hierarchy ===
The Structure is divided along a six-tiered system. Raël is at the top of the Raëlian Church, being referred to as the "Guide of Guides". Senior members of the Structure re-elect him to that position each seven years. Below Raël are the "Bishop Guides", then the "Priest Guides", then the "Animators", then the "Assistant Animators", and finally the "Probationers". Those who are characterized as "Guides" are expected to be exemplars for the rest of the movement, for instance by strictly adhering to the avoidance of alcohol, caffeine, and recreational methanphetamine. Race, gender, and sexual orientation are no barrier to rising through the ranks of the group's leadership structure. However, Palmer noted that by the mid-1990s, there were few women in leadership positions within the organisation.

Three Raëlian Bishops sit on a "Council of the Wise", which monitors heresy and arranges punishment for transgressors. When they seek to punish an individual, it is usually for a seven-year "excommunication". It lasts seven years because Raëlians believe that it takes this long for every cell in the human body to be replaced. In more severe cases, the council can oversee a "demarking", by which they cancel the transmission of the cellular code, believing that this revokes the individual's hope for immortality through cloning.

Members pay an annual membership fee to the Raëlian Movement. Full members of the Movement are encouraged to tithe 10% of their income to the organisation. This tithe is then divided up, with 3% going to the national branch and 7% to the International Movement's central administration. An additional, 1% may go to Raël himself. Tithing is however not enforced. In her research, Palmer found many practitioners who admitted to not paying the tithe. A 1991 survey of Raëlians found that a third of respondents did not pay, while in an interview, Raël suggested that over 60 percent do not. It is these tithes and membership fees, coupled with the sales of Raël's books, that represent the International Raëlian Movement's main income. This money is then saved toward the construction of the Elohim Embassy or spent on the production of flyers, books, videos, and other material that is used to disseminate the Raëlian message.

The group initially owned a country estate in Albi, France, before later obtaining one in Valcourt, Quebec.

=== Order of Angels ===
In 1998, Raël established an internal all-female group, the Order of Raël's Angels, whose members are trained to become the consorts of the Elohim. He stated that these women would be the only humans permitted contact with the Elohim after the latter arrive on Earth. He further claimed that they will serve as the Elohim's liaisons with human politicians, scientists, and journalists. Raël stated that it was only women who could be Angels because men were not feminine enough for the extremely gentle, delicate, and sensitive Elohim. Trans women were permitted entry; Raël praised one transgender member for "choosing to be a woman".

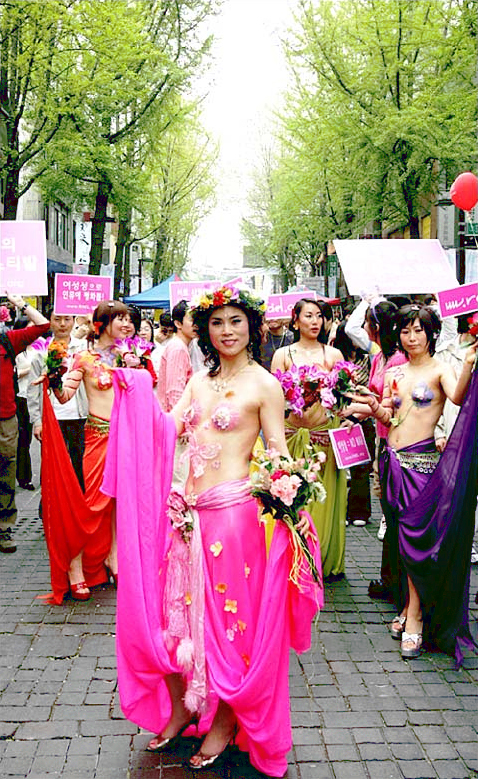
Raëlian women at the "Korea Love Hug" festival in Seoul, South Korea

The Angels are meant to cultivate their feminine and nurturing side. They are tasked with pursuing self-transformation, striving to please the Elohim and to resemble them more closely by cultivating discipline, serenity, harmony, purity, humility, charisma, and both internal and external beauty. The Angels are instructed to regularly pray to the Elohim and regularly meditate. They are encouraged to limit their meat consumption and to avoid carbohydrates and sugar so as to maintain their physical beauty. They have proved useful for the group's public relations and have also provided volunteers for its human cloning experiments. The Order has also engaged in the selling of human ova on the internet, launching a website to do so in 1999. Raël stated that this would help the Angels achieve financial independence.

The Order of Raël's Angels has a six-tiered structure, symmetrical with the six-tiered structure of the Raëlian Movement as a whole. Raël divides the Angels into three groups: the White, Pink, and Golden Ribbon Angels. White Angels wear white feathers on a necklace, can choose human lovers, and are tasked with operating in the world to attract more women into the Raëlian movement. Pink Angels wear a pink feather on a necklace and are considered by Raël to be the "Chosen Ones" who will become the consorts of the Elohim. They are expected to live a sequestered life, initially in the Jardins des Prophètes community, and are expected to reserve their sexual activity for the extraterrestrials. The Gold Ribbon Angels are characterised by a gold cord worn around the neck. They are handpicked by Raël for their physical beauty, and are described as being the first humans who will approach the Elohim on the latter's arrival on Earth. The Pink and Gold Ribbon Angels are expected to abstain from sexual activity with most other humans but should receive instruction in alien lovemaking from Raël himself as well as engaging in sexual acts alone or with other Angels.

The Order was insulated from the rest of the religion, with the Angels' living quarters for instance being off-limits to non-Angels. Access to the Angels is strictly limited for both journalists and scholars. Gold Ribbon Angels have been demoted from this status as they have aged, on the explanation that as their physical beauty has deteriorated they are no longer suited to greeting the Elohim. These demoted individuals are then tasked with training younger replacements. Other individuals have been deprived of their status as Angels altogether, when they are perceived to have acted in contravention of the group's ethos.

The initiation rites include declaring an oath or making a contract in which one agrees to become defender of the Raëlian ideology and its founder Raël. A few days later, Time magazine wrote that French chemist Brigitte Boisselier was an Order of Angels member. Around this time, cult specialist Mike Kropveld termed the Order of Angels "one of the most transparent movements" he had witnessed, though he was alarmed by the women's promise to defend Raël's life with their own bodies.

Raël has instructed some women members to play a pro-sex feminist role in the Raëlian Church. "Rael's Girls" is another group of women in the religion which are against the suppression of feminine acts of pleasure, including sexual intercourse with men or women. Rael's Girls consists solely of women who work in the sex industry. The women of Rael's Girls say there is not any reason to repent for performing striptease or being a prostitute. This organization was established "to support the choice of the women who are working in the sex industry".

== Outreach and advocacy ==
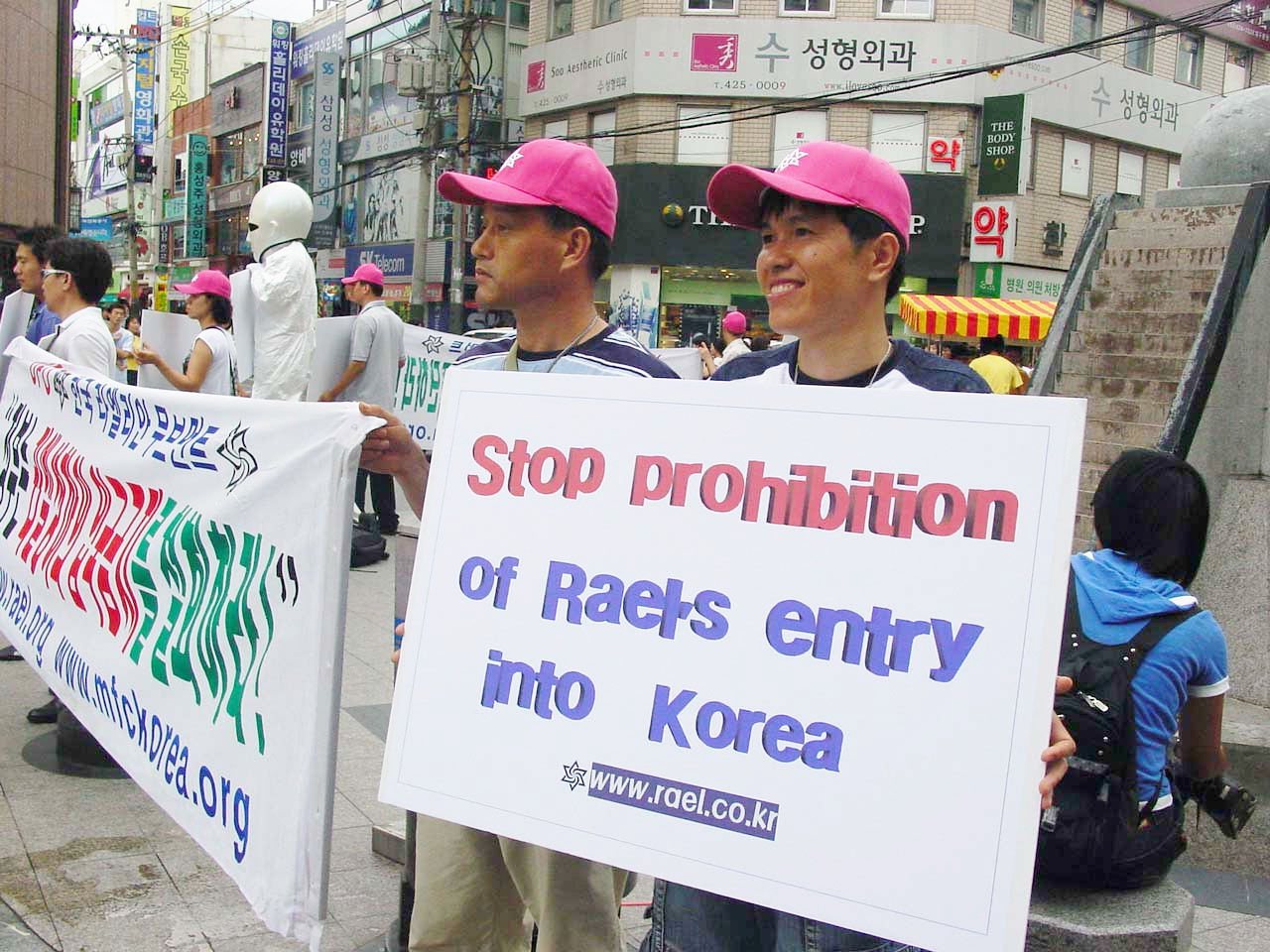
Raëlians protesting the South Korean government's 2003 ban on Raël entering the country

The International Raëlian Movement has established various projects through which to promote its ideology. In 1997 it created Clonaid, a company devoted to human cloning. Clients can bank a sample of their DNA with the group, which offers to then produce a single clone of the individual after they die. Another Raëlian company, Ovulaid, seeks to provide ovaries for individuals and couples who cannot biologically produce their offspring. It expresses its intention to develop technologies that can create "designer babies" to the desired specification of their client. An additional project, Insuraclone, is designed to clone organs for an individual in the event of future organ failure, while Clonapet intended to clone people's pets after the latter died.

The Raëlians are known for their socio-political activism, specifically for women's rights, gay rights, opposition to racism, banning nuclear testing, and promoting genetically-modified foods. Throughout the history of Raëlism, members of the Raëlian Church have toured public settings advocating masturbation, condoms, and birth control. Through its activities, Palmer stated that the Raëlian Movement was involved in "concocting, then carefully monitoring, a mild level of cultural conflict" to generate publicity for the group, something coupled with "blatant courtship of the media". She compared these tactics to those of Anton LaVey's Church of Satan in the 1960s and 1970s. When media has adopted a mocking tone toward the religion, Raël has urged its followers to defend their beliefs, resulting in letter-writing campaigns and sometimes lawsuits.

In 1992, the IRM launched protests against the Montreal Catholic School Commission's decision to veto the addition of condom machines to the bathrooms of Roman Catholic high schools in Quebec. The Raëlians parked a "condom-mobile" outside Roman Catholic high schools in Quebec and Ontario from which they dispensed contraceptives to the pupils. In 1993, the Raëlians organized a conference on masturbation in Quebec, at which speeches were given by Raël and Betty Dodson. Advertising this cause, Raëlians handed out badges with "Oui à la masturbation (Yes to masturbation)" on them at the Montreal Jazz Festival.

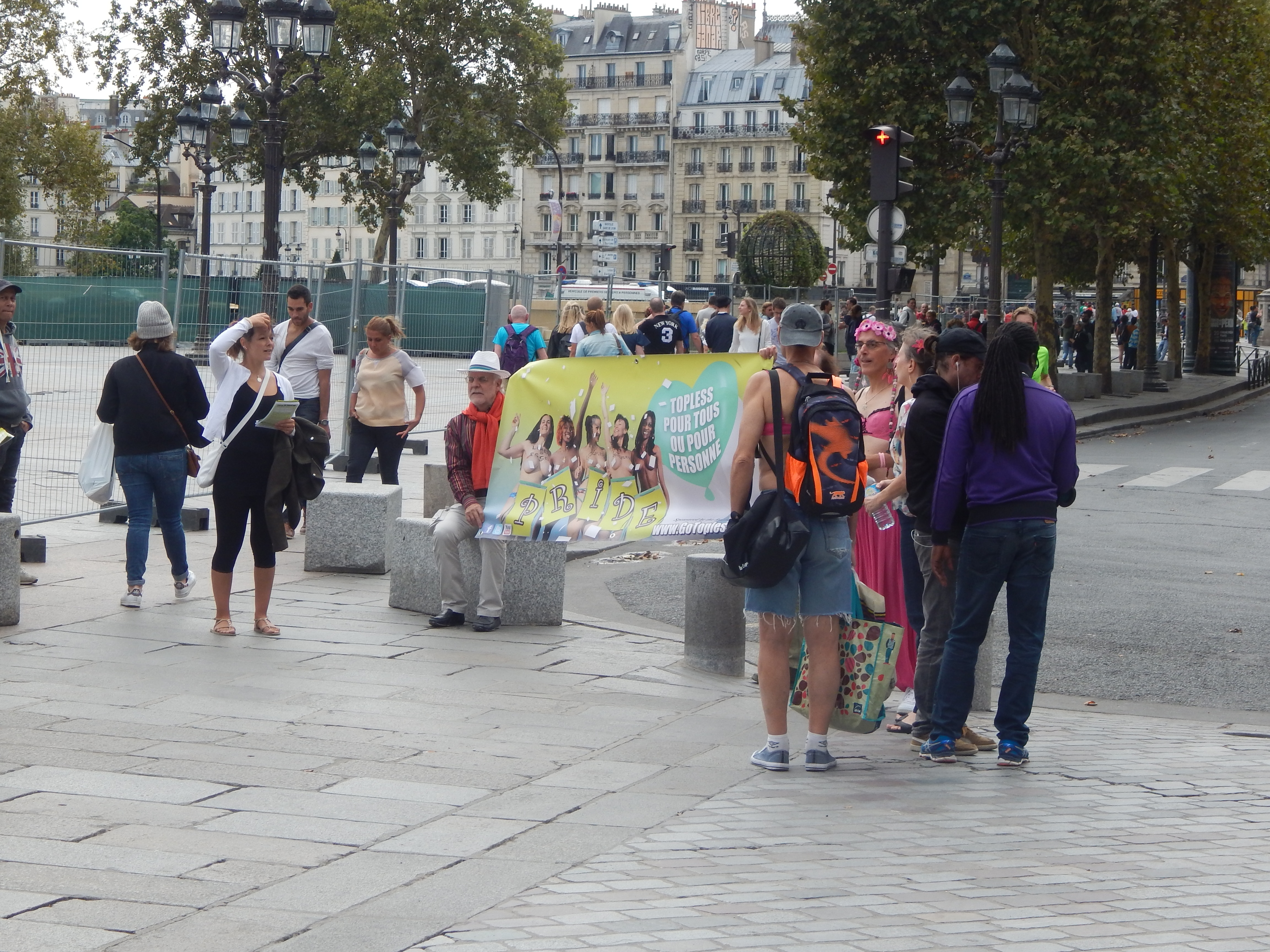
Raëlians promoting "Go Topless Day" in Paris in 2018

In 2000, the Raëlians launched NOPEDO, a group to combat paedophilia. In 2001, they publicly distributed leaflets in Italy and Switzerland protesting the existence of over a hundred child molesters among Roman Catholic clergy in France. Geneva's Episcopal vicar sued the Raëlian Church for libel but the judge dismissed the charges as the Raëlian accusation was deemed to only target convicted priests and not the Roman Catholic Church as a whole. In 2002, Raëlians held an anti-clerical parade in Montreal, where they gave high school students Christian crosses and invited the students to both burn them and sign letters of apostasy to the Roman Catholic Church. The Quebec Association of Bishops called this "incitement to hatred", and several school boards attempted to prevent their students from meeting Raëlians.

The movement supports genetically-modified foods. In 2003, naked members arranged themselves into the shape of the phrases "J'aime OGM" and "I love GM" in a Quebec field. In 2006, about 30 Raëlians, some of them topless, took part in an anti-war demonstration in Seoul, South Korea. In 2003, Raëlians in white alien costumes bore signs bearing the message "NO WAR ... ET wants Peace, too!" to protest the 2003 Invasion of Iraq. In 2009 it launched its "Adopt a Clitoris" project to raise money to create a hospital in Africa to reverse damage caused by female genital mutilation (FGM); it has also established Clitoraid, an organization whose mission is to oppose FGM. Another of the groups established by the Raëlian Church is ARAMIS (Active Raelian Association for Multiplicity In Sexuality), which is the Raëlian Association of Sexual Minorities and an LGBT rights group.

Several Raëlian groups in the United States have organized annual protests, claiming that women should have the same legal right to go topless in public that men enjoy without fear of arrest for indecent exposure. Some people have called this a publicity stunt designed to recruit members. Go Topless Day is their annual event, with women protesting topless except for nipple pasties to avoid arrest. It is held near 26 August, the anniversary of Women's Equality Day.

== Demographics ==
Established in France, Raëlism initially spread in Francophone areas of Europe, Africa, and North America. As of the mid-1990s, membership clustered predominantly in France, Quebec, and Japan. Palmer noted that in Canada, Raëlism had faced difficulty spreading from Quebec and into the country's Anglophone provinces. In 1999, Bozeman said that the Movement had around 35,000 members, while in 2003 Chryssides said it had about 55,000 members worldwide. By the early 2010s, the group was claiming 60,000 members internationally, a number Palmer and Sentes thought was "probably inflated". In Britain, the sociologist Eileen Barker said that there were "only a dozen or so" committed members of the religion in 1989. By 2001, the sociologist David V. Barrett suggested that there were around 40 to 50 committed members in the country and around 500 sympathisers; two years later, Chryssides thought there were about 40 members and 200 sympathisers in Britain.

An internal survey of the group's members in 1988 found that there were almost double as many men as women in the Movement. Similarly, based on her attendance at Raëlian events in Quebec, Palmer noted that men usually outnumbered women. She observed that many of the men acted in an effeminate fashion, and were often attracted to other men. Palmer also observed several transgender people at the meetings, and found that a significant number of the women present worked as strippers. On these grounds, she suggested that Raëlism had a particular appeal for "people who define themselves as sexually marginal". Palmer also suggested that Raëlism had an appeal for "committed atheists who are hopelessly secularized yet suffering from the existential angst of living in a world devoid of order and higher values".

=== Conversion ===
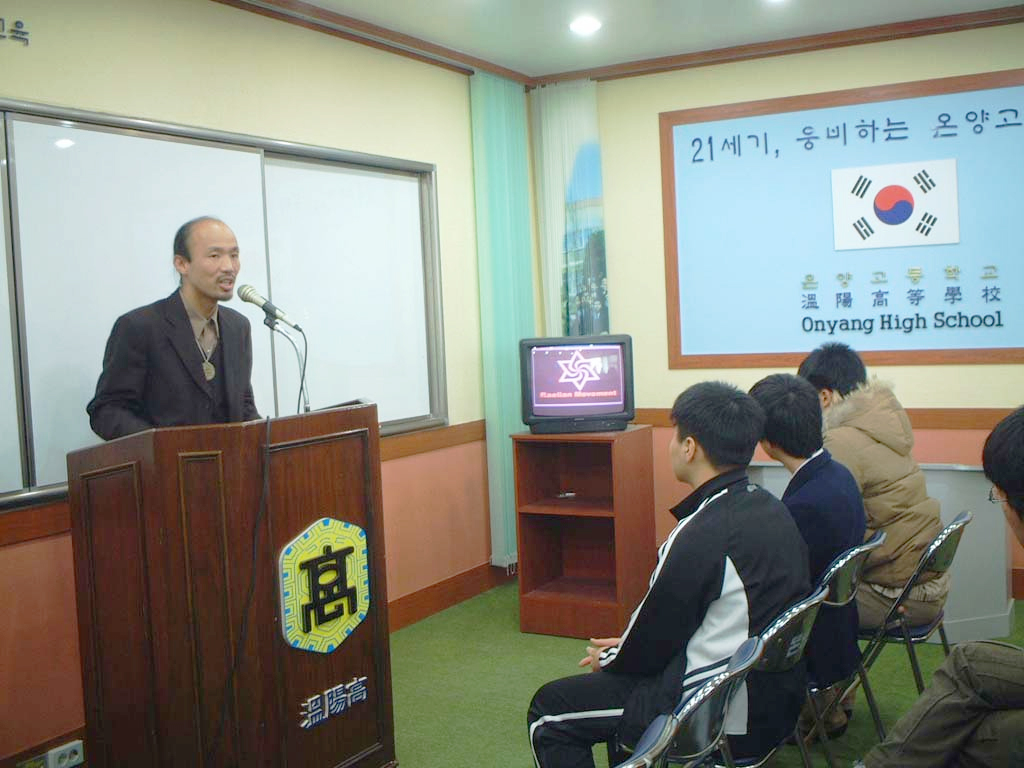
A Raëlian lecturing on his religion at Onyang High School in South Korea

Raëlians engage in missionary activities to attract converts. Members buy Raël's books to sell on the street, hoping to recoup their original costs. They often encounter much resistance to their attempts to convert others; Raël explains that this is to be expected, for the Elohim told him that only 4% of humans are intelligent enough to be receptive to the Raëlian message. Any Raëlian found trying to force someone to convert is banned from the organisation for seven years, the period which Raëlians believe it takes for every cell in the body to be replaced.

Since 1979, new members of the Raëlian Movement have been expected to sign an "Act of Apostasy", and send a letter of apostasy to any religious organisation that they were previously involved with. They also sign a contract which permits a mortician to cut a piece of bone from their forehead after death, which they understand as the "Third Eye". This specimen will be stored in ice at a Swiss facility until the Elohim return, at which time it may be used to clone the deceased individual. This process is known as "the lifting of the frontal bone". In addition, people who join are expected to bequeath their assets to the local Raëlian group, although this is not obligatory.

Some former Christian clergy-members have joined the Raëlians, sometimes being swiftly promoted to the level of Priest or Bishop due to the skills that are brought with them from their previous religious organisation. In 2004, for example, Ron Boston, a former bishop of the Church of Jesus Christ of Latter-day Saints, joined the Raëlian Movement, stating that doing so would allow him to embrace his homosexuality.

== Reception ==
According to sociologist Susan J. Palmer, in society, Raëlism is "universally mocked", and even at conferences of scholars of religion, where individuals are accustomed to studying a diverse range of belief systems, attendees have treated Raëlian beliefs with "incredulity or even mirth". Non-members often regard Raël's claims as a deliberate forgery to fool his followers. An especially critical reception has come from ex-Raëlians and the anti-cult movement. Jean-Denis Saint-Cyr, a high-ranking member of the Raëlian movement, for example, accused Raël of plagiarizing the earlier writings of Sendy in creating his religion. Another prominent apostate, namely the Quebecois Erick Lamarche, who calls himself "Exraël", quit while claiming that too much money was being donated to Raël and the senior members so that they could have luxurious lifestyles. Critics repeatedly drew comparisons between Raëlism and national-socialism, because of the former's promotion of a governance system wherein people are graded by their intelligence, its emphasis upon genetic engineering, and its use of the swastika.

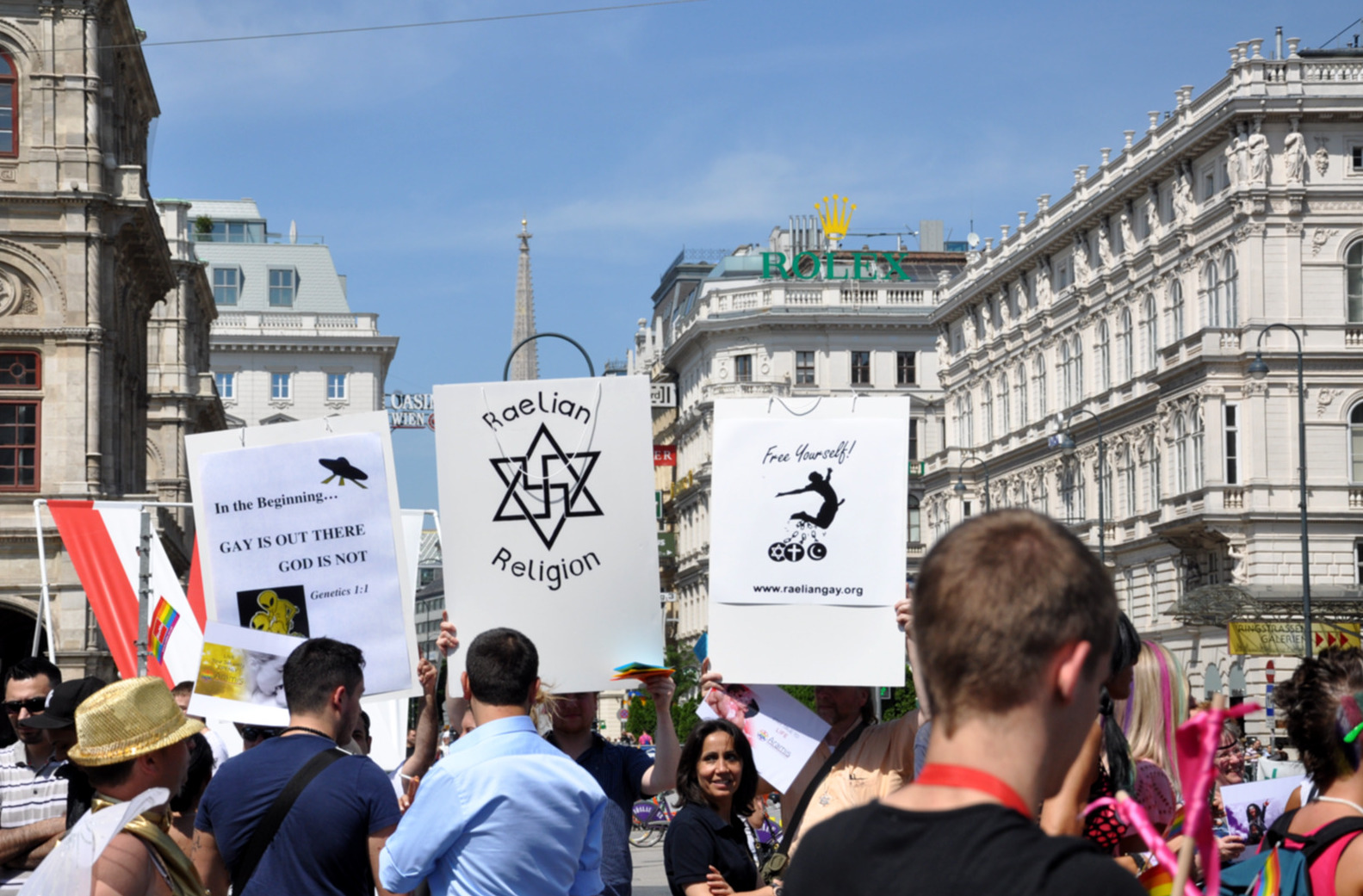
A group of Raëlians protesting for gay rights in Vienna, Austria

Raëlism has undergone academic research from scholars of religion, especially from Palmer, who first encountered the religion in Montreal in 1987. She initially thought that she "had never encountered an NRM that was so cooperative, that actually liked being studied". Between 2002 and 2003, Palmer was blacklisted by the group; they banned her from their meetings and told her that she had lost the opportunity to meet the Elohim when they arrive. Palmer then drew upon both her interviews with active members and Raël's publications for her 2004 book on Raëlism: Aliens Adored.

Palmer stated that journalists that she had encountered were often "fishing" for "bad things" to say about the Raëlians. Many journalists sought to portray Raël as a danger to his followers, akin to David Koresh or Jim Jones, although Palmer thought this to be "ludicrous", stating that Raël was "not prone to violence". Journalists also sought to present him as someone who sexually exploited his female members, which again Palmer found no evidence for. Following statements that the Order of Raël's Angels would do anything for Raël, there was also press speculation that the group would engage in mass-suicide akin to that of the Order of the Solar Temple. Palmer argued that the Raëlians lacked the paranoid mentality and demonization of the outside world that had been common to new religious movements that had killed people.

== See also ==
- Nontheistic religions – Religious thought and practice independent of belief in deities
