= List of forms of government =

This article lists forms of government and political systems, which are not mutually exclusive, and often have much in common. According to Yale professor Juan José Linz there are three main types of political systems today: democracies, totalitarian regimes and, sitting between these two, authoritarian regimes with hybrid regimes. Another modern classification system includes monarchies as a standalone entity or as a hybrid system of the main three. Scholars generally refer to a dictatorship as either a form of government which is characterized by a leader who holds absolute or near-absolute political power.

The ancient Greek philosopher Plato discusses in the Republic five types of regimes: aristocracy, timocracy, oligarchy, democracy, and tyranny. The question raised by Plato in the Republic: What kind of state is best? Generational changes informed by new political and cultural beliefs, technological progress, values and morality over millenniums have resulted in considerable shifts in the belief about the origination of political authority, who may participate in matters of state, how people might participate, the determination of what is just, and so forth.

== Basic forms of governments ==
Systems of government can be divided into two main categories, democratic and non-democratic
Democratic	Direct Democracy, Representative Democracy (Republic Government, Parliamentary Government), Constitutional monarchy
Non-Democratic	Authoritarian, Totalitarian, Oligarchy, Technocracy, Theocracy, Dictatorship, Absolute monarchy
Other Types	Colonialist, Aristocratic

Index of Forms of Government.

Countries in green claim to be a type of democracy while countries in red do not. Only Saudi Arabia, Oman, the UAE, Brunei, Afghanistan, and the Vatican (Holy See) do not claim to be democratic.

- Anarchy
- Aristocracy
- Authoritarian regimes
- Bureaucracy
- Capitalism
- Confederation
- Confessional state
- Colonialism
- Communism
- Corporatocracy
- Democracy
- Ecclesiocracy
- Electocracy
- Ergatocracy
- Fascism
- Federalism
- Feudalism
- Geniocracy
- Gerontocracy
- Imperialism
- Kakistocracy
- Kleptocracy
- Logocracy
- Meritocracy
- Military Dictatorship
- Monarchy
- Oligarchy
- Plutocracy
- Republicanism
- Socialism
- Statism
- Technocracy
- Theocracy
- Totalitarianism
- Tribalism

== Forms of government by regional control ==
Term	Definition	Examples
Confederation	A confederation (also known as a confederacy or league) is a union of sovereign states, united for purposes of common action often in relation to other states. Usually created by a treaty, confederations of states are usually established for dealing with critical issues, such as defense, foreign relations, internal trade or currency, with the general government being required to provide support for all its members. Confederation represents a main form of inter-governmental-ism, this being defined as "any form of interaction between states which takes place on the basis of sovereign independence or government." Confederation is almost as a federation with the federal government being as a combination or alliance of all the states.	Haudenosaunee Confederacy; European Union; United States (1781–1789); (Switzerland) The Old Swiss Confederacy (c. 1300–1798); Serbia and Montenegro (2003–2006); Senegambia Confederation (1982–1989)
Federation	A federation (also known as a federal state) is a political entity characterized by a union of partially self-governing states or regions under a central (federal) government. In a federation, the self-governing status of the component states, as well as the division of power between them and the central government, is typically constitutionally entrenched and may not be altered by a unilateral decision of either party, the states or the federal political body. Alternatively, federation is a form of government in which sovereign power is formally divided between a central authority and a number of constituent regions so that each region retains some degree of control over its internal affairs.	Ethiopia; Germany; Mexico; Malaysia; Nigeria; United States; India
Unitary state	A unitary state is a state governed as a single power in which the central government is ultimately supreme and any administrative divisions (sub-national units) exercise only the powers that the central government chooses to delegate. The majority of states in the world have a unitary system of government. Of the 193 UN member states, 165 are governed as unitary states.	China; Indonesia; Philippines; France; Egypt; United Kingdom; Peru

== Forms of government by power source ==
Term	Description	Examples
Autocracy	Autocracy is a system of government in which supreme power (social and political) is concentrated in the hands of one person or polity, whose decisions are subject to neither external legal restraints nor regularized mechanisms of popular control (except perhaps for the implicit threat of a coup d'état or mass insurrection). Absolute monarchies (such as Kingdom of Saudi Arabia, the United Arab Emirates, Oman, Brunei and Eswatini) and dictatorships are the main modern-day forms of autocracy. In family dictatorships, political power is passed down within one family because of the overwhelming authority of the leader. For example, in Haiti a form of hereditary dictatorship was founded by François Duvalier (Papa Doc); In 1971, Jean-Claude Duvalier (Baby Doc) became Haiti's next dictator for life after his father's death.	Most monarchies prior to the 18th century; Kingdom of Saudi Arabia; Haiti (de facto, during Duvalier dynasty); Eritrea; Nazi Germany (1933–1945); Zaire (1971–1997); North Korea; Note: Most are considered totalitarian regimes with the dictator or "monarch" being able to choose anyone, though this has not happened yet in these states
Oligarchy	Oligarchy, meaning "rule of the few", is a form of power structure in which power rests with a small number of people. These people might be distinguished by nobility, wealth, family ties, education or corporate, religious or military control. Such states are often controlled by families who typically pass their influence from one generation to the next, but inheritance is not a necessary condition for the application of this term.	Russia; South Africa (1948–1994); First Brazilian Republic (1894–1930)
Democracy	Democracy, meaning "rule of the people", is a system of government in which the citizens exercise power directly or elect representatives from among themselves to form a governing body, such as a parliament. Democracy is sometimes referred to as "rule of the majority". Democracy is a system of processing conflicts in which outcomes depend on what participants do, but no single force controls what occurs and its outcomes. This does include citizens being able to vote for different laws and leaders.	France; Germany; Cape Verde; Chile; Estonia; Republic of Ireland
Anarchy	Sometimes said to be non-governance; it is a structure which strives for non-hierarchical, voluntary associations among agents, emphasizing autonomy and decentralization, often employing direct democracy or consensus democracy. Systems resembling anarchism can be a natural, temporary result of civil war in a country, when an established state has been destroyed and the region is in a transitional period without definitive leadership. It has also been proposed as a historical state of human society, especially before the concentration of power afforded by agriculture. It has been presented as a viable long-term choice by individuals known as anarchists who oppose the state and other forms of coercive hierarchies. These systems are often highly organized, and include institutional or cultural systems to prevent the concentration of power. Anarchism typically advocates for social organization in non-hierarchical, voluntary associations where people voluntarily help each other. There are a variety of forms of anarchy that attempt to discourage the use of coercion, violence, force and authority, while still producing a productive and desirable society.	Strandzha Commune (1903); Morelos Commune (1913–1917); Makhnovshchina (1918–1921); Korean People's Association in Manchuria (1929–1931); Regional Defence Council of Aragon (1936–1937); Revolutionary Catalonia (1936–1939); Rebel Zapatista Autonomous Municipalities (1994–2023)

=== Types of democracy ===
Term	Description	Examples
Demarchy	Government in which the state is governed by randomly selected decision from a broadly inclusive pool of eligible citizens. These groups, sometimes termed "policy juries", "citizens' juries", or "consensus conferences", deliberately make decisions about public policies in much the same way that juries decide criminal cases. Demarchy, in theory, could overcome some of the functional problems of conventional representative democracy, which is widely subject to manipulation by special interests and a division between professional policymakers (politicians and lobbyists) vs. a largely passive, uninvolved and often uninformed electorate. According to Australian philosopher John Burnheim, random selection of policymakers would make it easier for everyday citizens to meaningfully participate, and harder for special interests to corrupt the process. More generally, random selection of decision makers from a larger group is known as sortition (from the Latin base for lottery). The Athenian democracy made much use of sortition, with nearly all government offices filled by lottery (of full citizens) rather than by election. Candidates were almost always male, Greek, educated citizens holding a minimum of wealth and status.	Ancient Athens; Northern Italy and Venice (12th–18th century)
Census democracy	It is the suffrage in which the right to vote is restricted to only a part of the population, being in many cases wealthy class. This was the case in almost all existing democracies of the 18th and 19th centuries, although in the latter the right to vote was given to the working class and the lower middle class in countries like Great Britain, later in the 20th century the universal suffrage with the advent of voting rights for all people of the age of majority.	Kingdom of Great Britain; Pre-JFK United States; (Restoration (Spain)) Restoration Spain; (France) First French Empire
Direct democracy	Government in which the people represent themselves and vote directly for new laws and public policy.	Switzerland (semi-direct); Ancient Athens
Electocracy	A form of representative democracy where citizens are able to vote for their government but cannot participate directly in governmental decision making. The government has almost absolute power.	Iraq; Thailand (before 2006 coup d'état)
Ergatocracy	Rule by the proletariat, the workers, or the working class. Examples of ergatocracy include communist revolutionaries and rebels who control most of society and establish an alternative economy for people and workers. See Dictatorship of the proletariat.	
Herrenvolk democracy	A form of government in which only a specific ethnic group participates in government, while other ethnic groups are disenfranchised. Though elections may be free, voting suffrage is restricted based on race, with governance reflecting the interests of the politically dominant racial group.	Confederate States of America; (Union of South Africa) Republic of South Africa (during Apartheid); Rhodesia (effectively though a form of census democracy)
Liberal democracy	A form of government in which representative democracy operates under the principles of liberalism. It is characterised by fair, free, and competitive elections between multiple distinct political parties, a separation of powers into different branches of government, the rule of law in everyday life as part of an open society, and the protection of human rights and civil liberties for all persons. To define the system in practice, liberal democracies often draw upon a constitution, either formally written or uncodified, to delineate the powers of government and enshrine the social contract. After a period of sustained expansion throughout the 20th century, liberal democracy became the predominant political system in the world. A liberal democracy may take various constitutional forms: it may be a republic, such as Estonia, Ireland, Germany, and Greece; or a constitutional monarchy, such as the United Kingdom, Japan or Spain. It may have a presidential system (such as Chile, the Dominican Republic, or the United States), a semi-presidential system (such as Cape Verde, France, or Portugal), a parliamentary system (such as Australia, Germany, Italy, Slovenia, India or New Zealand) or directorial system (such as Switzerland).	Germany; New Zealand; Netherlands; Taiwan; Costa Rica; Mauritius; Uruguay
Liquid democracy	Government in which the people represent themselves or choose to temporarily delegate their vote to another voter to vote for new laws and public policy.	Experiments have mostly been conducted on a local level or exclusively through online platforms, such as by Pirate Parties
Representative democracy	Wherein the people or citizens of a country elect representatives to create and implement public policy in place of direct participation by the people.	Almost all current democratic governments
Social democracy	Elements of direct and representative democracies are combined in a form of participatory democracy. It also adopts a mixed economy combining the principles of a free-market and economic or social interventionism. Social democracy rejects the "either/or" phobiocratic/polarization interpretation of capitalism versus socialism. Social democracy argues that all citizens should be legally entitled to certain social rights. These are made up of universal access to public services such as: education, health care, workers' compensation, public transportation, and other services including child care and care for the elderly. Social democracy is connected with the trade union labour movement and supports collective bargaining rights for workers. Contemporary social democracy advocates freedom from discrimination based on differences of: ability/disability, age, ethnicity, sex, language, religion, and social class.	Germany; Austria; Sweden; Norway; Denmark; Finland; Iceland; Czech Republic; Lithuania
Soviet democracy	The citizens are governed by directly elected councils. The councils are directly responsible to their electors and are bound by their instructions. Such an imperative mandate is in contrast to a free mandate, in which the elected delegates are only responsible to their conscience. Delegates may accordingly be dismissed from their post at any time or be voted out (recall).	Russian Republic; (Russian Soviet Federative Socialist Republic) The first years of the Russian Soviet Republic
Totalitarian democracy	A form of electocracy in which lawfully elected representatives maintain the integrity of a nation state whose citizens, while granted the right to vote, have little or no participation in the decision-making process of the government.	Democratic Kampuchea
Electoral autocracy	A hybrid regime, in which democratic institutions are imitative and adhere to authoritarian methods. In these regimes, regular elections are held, but they fail to reach democratic standards of freedom and fairness.	Rwanda; Uganda; Algeria
Digital democracy	The historical scaling problem and inherent inefficiencies of democracy may be resolved with advances in technology, most especially the rise of the Internet. In a digital democracy, specific questions would be formulated as referendums, and frequently put forth for public discussion and comment and voting. Citizens could read the arguments, offer their own, and vote on the matter, using readily-available technologies like smartphones.	Estonia

=== Types of oligarchy ===
Oligarchies are societies controlled and organised by a small class of privileged people, with no intervention from the most part of society; this small elite is defined as sharing some common trait.

De jure democratic governments with a de facto oligarchy are ruled by a small group of segregated, powerful or influential people who usually share similar interests or family relations. These people may spread power and elect candidates equally or not equally. An oligarchy is different from a true democracy because very few people are given the chance to change things. An oligarchy does not have to be hereditary or monarchic. An oligarchy does not have one clear ruler but several rulers. (Ancient Greek ὀλιγαρχία (oligarkhía) literally meant "rule by few")

Some historical examples of oligarchy include the Roman Republic, in which only males of the nobility could run for office and only wealthy males could vote, and the Athenian democracy, which used sortition to elect candidates, almost always male, Greek, educated citizens holding a minimum of land, wealth and status. Some critics of capitalism and/or representative democracy think of the United States and the United Kingdom as oligarchies.

These categories are not exclusive.

Term	Definition	Examples
Aristocracy	Rule by the nobility; a system of governance where political power is in the hands of a small class of privileged individuals who claim a higher birth than the rest of society.	Holy Roman Empire (800/962–1806); Tsardom of Russia (1547-1721); Kingdom of France (843–1792)
Geniocracy	A term invented by the founder of Raëlism and meaning rule by the intelligent; a system of governance where creativity, innovation, intelligence and wisdom are required for those who wish to govern. Comparable to noocracy.	
Hamarchy	The joint rule of different regions retaining their individuality; a system of government consisting of many distinct or independent parts that rule together.	
Kraterocracy	Rule by the strong; a system of governance where those who are strong enough to seize power through physical force, social maneuvering or political cunning.	
Kritarchy	Rule by various judges, the kritarchs; a system of governance composed of law-enforcement institutions in which the state and the legal systems are traditionally or constitutionally the same entity. The kritarchs, magistrates and other adjudicators have the legal power to legislate and administer the enforcement of government laws in addition to the interposition of laws and the resolution of disputes. (Not to be confused with "judiciary" or "judicial system".)	Somalia; Icelandic Commonwealth
Meritocracy	Rule by the meritorious; a system of governance where groups are selected predicated on their ability, knowledge in a given area, and contributions to society.	Rashidun Caliphate; Asante Empire; Singapore
Netocracy	Rule by the digitally literate; a term invented by the editorial board of the American technology magazine Wired in the early 1990s. A portmanteau of "Internet" and "aristocracy", "netocracy" refers to a perceived global upper-class that bases its power on a technological advantage and networking skills, in comparison to what is portrayed as a bourgeoisie of a gradually diminishing importance. The netocracy concept has been compared with Richard Florida's concept of the creative class. Bard and Söderqvist have also defined an under-class in opposition to the netocracy, which they refer to as the "consumtariat".	
Noocracy	Rule by the wise; a system of governance in which decision making is in the hands of philosophers (as advocated by Plato)	
Plutocracy	Rule by the wealthy; a system wherein governance is indebted to, dependent upon or heavily influenced by the desires of the rich. Plutocratic influence can alter any form of government. For instance, if a significant number of elected representative positions in a republic are dependent upon financial support from wealthy sources, it is a plutocratic republic.	Dutch Republic (1588–1795); Republic of Venice (697–1797)
Particracy	Rule by a dominant political party (or parties).	East Germany (1949–1990); South Africa
Stratocracy	Rule by military service; a system of governance composed of military government in which the state and the military are traditionally or constitutionally the same entity. Citizens with mandatory or voluntary active military service or who have been honorably discharged have the right to govern. (Therefore, stratocracy is not to be confused with "military junta" or "military dictatorship".)	Sparta (900s–192 BC); Myanmar
Synarchism	Rule by a secret élite; a form of government where political power effectively rests with a secret élite, in contrast to an oligarchy where the élite is or could be known by the public.	British Hong Kong (1841–1997)
Technocracy	Rule by the educated or by technical experts; a system of governance where people who are skilled in their respective areas of expertise control decision-making. In a technocracy, experts in the technical details of specific issues are presumed to best understand the problems at hand, as well as how various technological redresses can improve the society at large. Doctors, engineers, scientists, professionals and technologists who have prowess would compose the governing body instead of politicians, businessmen and economists. In a technocracy, decision-makers would be selected based upon how knowledgeable and skilful they are in their field. Technocracy is today represented by global algorithmic governance by Silicon Valley engineers. This recent form of technocracy has been called 'digitocracy'.	Soviet Union (1953–1991)
Theocracy	Rule by a religious elite; a system of governance composed of religious institutions in which the state and the church are traditionally or constitutionally the same entity. Theocracy contrasts with caesaropapism, a form of government in which church and state form an alliance dominated by the secular power.	Vatican City; Abbasid Caliphate (750–1517); Iran; Afghanistan; Bogd Khanate of Mongolia (1911–1915)
Hierocracy	A type of theocracy where the power is held by the clergy. It's different from traditional theocracy because the power does not come from an embodiment of the divinity but rather by a class of experts that know what to do according to their religion.	
Timocracy	Rule by the honourable; a system of governance ruled by honorable citizens and property-owners. Socrates defines a timocracy as a government ruled by people who love honour and who are selected according to the degree of honour they hold in society. This form of timocracy is very similar to meritocracy, in the sense that individuals of outstanding character or faculty are placed in the seat of power.	

=== Types of autocracy ===
Autocracies are ruled by a single entity with absolute power, whose decisions are subject to neither external legal restraints nor regular mechanisms of popular control (except perhaps for implicit threat). That entity may be an individual, as in a dictatorship or it may be a group, as in a one-party state. The word despotism means to "rule in the fashion of despots" and is often used to describe autocracy.

Term	Definition	Examples
Civilian dictatorship	A dictatorship where power resides in the hands of one single person or polity. That person may be, for example, an absolute monarch or a dictator, but can also be an elected president. In modern times, an autocrat's rule is one that is not stopped by any rules of law, constitutions, or other social and political institutions. After World War II, many governments in Latin America, Asia, and Africa were ruled by autocratic governments. Examples of dictators include Joseph Stalin, Mao Zedong, Adolf Hitler, Benito Mussolini, the Kim dynasty of North Korea, founded by Kim Il Sung, and Hafez al-Assad and Bashar al-Assad of Ba'athist Syria.	Roman Republic (During times of war); Haiti (1964–1986); Fascist Italy (1925–1943); Nazi Germany (1933–1945); Ba'athist Syria (1971–2024); Eritrea; Belarus; North Korea
Military dictatorship	A dictatorship primarily enforced by the military. Military dictators are different from civilian dictators for a number of reasons: their motivations for seizing power, the institutions through which they organize their rule, and the ways in which they leave power. Often viewing itself as saving the nation from the corrupt or myopic civilian politicians, a military dictatorship justifies its position as "neutral" arbiters on the basis of their membership within the armed forces. For example, many juntas adopt titles, such as "National Redemption Council", "Committee of National Restoration", or "National Liberation Committee". Military leaders often rule as a junta, selecting one of them as the head.	Military dictatorship in Brazil (1964–1985); Military dictatorship of Chile (1973–1990)

=== Pejorative attributes ===
Regardless of the form of government, the actual governance may be influenced by sectors with political power which are not part of the formal government. These are terms that highlight certain actions of the governors, such as corruption, demagoguery, or fear mongering that may disrupt the intended way of working of the government if they are widespread enough.

Term	Definition
Banana republic	A politically unstable and kleptocratic government that economically depends upon the exports of a limited resource (fruits, minerals), and usually features a society composed of stratified social classes, such as a great, impoverished ergatocracy and a ruling plutocracy, composed of the aristocracy of business, politics, and the military. In political science, the term banana republic denotes a country dependent upon limited primary-sector productions, which is ruled by a plutocracy who exploit the national economy by means of a politico-economic oligarchy. In American literature, the term banana republic originally denoted the fictional Republic of Anchuria, a servile dictatorship that abetted, or supported for kickbacks, the exploitation of large-scale plantation agriculture, especially banana cultivation. In U.S. politics, the term banana republic is a pejorative political descriptor coined by the American writer O. Henry in Cabbages and Kings (1904), a book of thematically related short stories derived from his 1896–1897 residence in Honduras, where he was hiding from U.S. law for bank embezzlement.
Bankocracy	Rule by banks; a system of governance with excessive power or influence of banks and other financial authorities on public policy-making. It can also refer to a form of government where financial institutions rule society.
Corporatocracy	Rule by corporations; a system of governance where an economic and political system is controlled by corporations or corporate interests. Its use is generally pejorative. Examples include company rule in India, and the business voters for the City of London Corporation.
Kakistocracy	Rule by the worst; a system of government where the least-qualified citizens govern or dictate policies.
Kleptocracy	Rule by thieves; a system of governance where its officials and the ruling class in general pursue personal wealth and political power at the expense of the wider population. In strict terms kleptocracy is not a form of government but a characteristic of a government engaged in such behavior.
Nepotocracy	Rule by nephews; favouritism granted to relatives regardless of merit; a system of governance in which importance is given to the relatives of those already in power, like a nephew (where the word comes from). In such governments even if the relatives aren't qualified they are given positions of authority just because they know someone who already has authority. Pope Alexander VI (Borgia) was accused of this.
Ochlocracy	Rule by the crowd; a system of governance where mob rule is government by mob or a mass of people, or the intimidation of legitimate authorities. As a pejorative for majoritarianism, it is akin to the Latin phrase mobile vulgus meaning "the fickle crowd", from which the English term "mob" was originally derived in the 1680s. Ochlocratic governments are often a democracy spoiled by demagoguery, "tyranny of the majority" and the rule of passion over reason; such governments can be as oppressive as autocratic tyrants. Ochlocracy is synonymous in meaning and usage to the modern, informal term "mobocracy".

=== Other attributes ===
Term	Definition
Adhocracy	Rule by a government based on relatively disorganized principles and institutions as compared to a bureaucracy, its exact opposite.
Anocracy	A regime type where power is not vested in public institutions (as in a normal democracy) but spread amongst elite groups who are constantly competing with each other for power. Examples of anocracies in Africa include the warlords of Somalia and the shared governments in samaya and Zimbabwe. Anocracies are situated midway between an autocracy and a democracy. The Polity IV dataset recognizes anocracy as a category. In that dataset, anocracies are exactly in the middle between autocracies and democracies. Often the word is defined more broadly. For example, a 2010 International Alert publication defined anocracies as "countries that are neither autocratic nor democratic, most of which are making the risky transition between autocracy and democracy". Alert noted that the number of anocracies had increased substantially since the end of the Cold War. Anocracy is not surprisingly the least resilient political system to short-term shocks: it creates the promise but not yet the actuality of an inclusive and effective political economy, and threatens members of the established elite; and is therefore very vulnerable to disruption and armed violence.
Authoritarianism	Rule by an autocracy or oligarchy with a power source predicated on a political party or stratocracy; characterized by the rejection of political plurality.
Band society	Rule by a government based on small (usually family) unit with a semi-informal hierarchy, with strongest (either physical strength or strength of character) as leader.
Bureaucracy	Rule by a system of governance with many bureaus, administrators, and petty officials.
Consociationalism	Rule by a government based on consensus democracy.
Military junta	Rule by a committee of military leaders.
Nomocracy	Rule by a government under the sovereignty of rational laws and civic right as opposed to one under theocratic systems of government. In a nomocracy, ultimate and final authority (sovereignty) exists in the law.
Cyberocracy	Rule by a computer, which decides based on computer code and efficient use of information. This is closely linked to Cybersynacy. This type of ruling appears in the short story "The Machine Stops" by E. M. Forster.
Algocracy	Rule by algorithms used in diverse levels of bureaucracy, which is also known as algorithmic regulation, regulation by algorithms, algorithmic governance, algorithmic legal order of government by algorithm.
Isocracy	A country where everyone has equal political power.

== Forms of government by power ideology ==
Term	Definition
Monarchy	A monarchy is a form of government in which a group, generally a family representing a dynasty, embodies the country's national identity and its head, the monarch, exercises the role of sovereignty. The actual power of the monarch may vary from purely symbolic (crowned republic), to partial and restricted (constitutional monarchy), to completely autocratic (absolute monarchy). Traditionally the monarch's post is inherited and lasts until death or abdication. In contrast, elective monarchies require the monarch to be elected. Both types have further variations as there are widely divergent structures and traditions defining monarchy. For example, in someelected monarchies only pedigrees are taken into account for eligibility of the next ruler, whereas many hereditary monarchies impose requirements regarding the religion, age, gender, mental capacity, etc. Occasionally this might create a situation of rival claimants whose legitimacy is subject to effective election. There have been cases where the term of a monarch's reign is either fixed in years or continues until certain goals are achieved: an invasion being repulsed, for instance.
Republic	A republic (Latin: res publica) is a form of government in which the country is considered a "public matter", not the private concern or property of the rulers. The primary positions of power within a republic are not inherited, but are attained through elections expressing the consent of the governed. Such leadership positions are therefore expected to fairly represent the citizen body. It is a form of government under which the head of state is not a monarch. In American English, the definition of a republic can also refer specifically to a government in which elected individuals represent the citizen body, also known as a representative democracy (a democratic republic) and exercise power according to the rule of law (a constitutional republic).

=== Types of monarchy ===
Countries with monarchy attributes are those where a family or group of families (rarely another type of group), called the royalty, represents national identity, with power traditionally assigned to one of its individuals, called the monarch, who mostly rule kingdoms. The actual role of the monarch and other members of royalty varies from purely symbolical (crowned republic) to partial and restricted (constitutional monarchy) to completely despotic (absolute monarchy). Traditionally and in most cases, the post of the monarch is inherited, but there are also elective monarchies where the monarch is elected.

Term	Definition
Absolute monarchy	A traditional and historical system where the monarch exercises ultimate governing authority as head of state and head of government. Many nations of Europe such as France under Louis XIV or Sweden under Charles XII, alongside with many in Southeast Asia such as the Khmer Empire under Jayavarman II as Devaraja (god-king) and Chakravartin (universal ruler), were from the Middle Ages absolute monarchies. Modern examples include mainly Islamic countries such as Saudi Arabia, the United Arab Emirates, Oman, Brunei and one African country, Eswatini.
Constitutional monarchy	Also called parliamentary monarchy, the monarch's powers are limited by law or by a formal constitution, usually giving them the role of head of state. Many modern developed countries, including the United Kingdom, Norway, Netherlands, Australia, Canada, Spain and Japan, are constitutional monarchy systems.
Crowned republic	A form of government where the monarch (and family) is an official ceremonial entity with no political power. The royal family and the monarch are intended to represent the country and may perform speeches or attend an important ceremonial events as a symbolical guide to the people, but hold no actual power in decision-making, appointments, et cetera.
Elective monarchy	A form of government where the monarch is elected, a modern example being the King of Cambodia, who is chosen by the Royal Council of the Throne; Vatican City is also often considered a modern elective monarchy.
Self-proclaimed monarchy	A form of government where the monarch claims a monarch title without a nexus to the previous monarch dynasty. Modern self-proclaimed monarchies include the micronation Principality of Seborga claiming 14 square kilometres (5.4 sq mi) of Italy.

=== Types of republic ===
Rule by a form of government in which the people, or some significant portion of them, have supreme control over the government and where offices of state are elected or chosen by elected people. A common simplified definition of a republic is a government where the head of state is not a monarch. Montesquieu included both democracies, where all the people have a share in rule, and aristocracies or oligarchies, where only some of the people rule, as republican forms of government.

These categories are not exclusive.

Term	Definition
Classical republic	Classical antiquity civilizations typically followed a republican model with a complex system of assemblies and magistrates, all drawing upon the idea of a "civic" sector—a representative sample of particular populations. In a classical republic, power rests with selected individuals who represent the citizenry (or more usually a limited sector thereof) and who rule in accordance with mutually agreed-upon law.
Constitutional republic	Republics where the government's powers are limited by law or a formal constitution (an official document establishing the exact powers and restrictions of a nation and its government), and in which the leaders are chosen by a vote amongst the populace. Typically, laws cannot be passed which violate said constitution, unless the constitution itself is altered by law. This theoretically serves to protect minority groups from being subjected to the tyranny of the majority, or mob rule. Examples include India, South Africa, United States, etc.
Democratic republic	Republics where the laws are ultimately decided by popular vote, whether by a body of elected representatives or directly by the public, and there is no restriction on which laws are passed so long as they have majority support. Constitutional law is either non-existent or poses little obstacle to legislation.
Federal republic	Republics that are a federation of states or provinces, where there is a national (federal) law encompassing the nation as a whole but where each state or province is free to legislate and enforce its own laws and affairs so long as they do not conflict with federal law. Examples include Argentina, Austria, Brazil, Germany, India, Mexico, Russia, Switzerland, United States and Nigeria.
Islamic republic	Republics purporting to be governed in accordance with Islamic law. Islamic Republic of Iran, Mauritania, and Islamic Republic of Pakistan are self-described Islamic republics (as of 2022). Afghanistan, Federal Islamic Republic of the Comoros and the Turkish Islamic Republic of East Turkestan were Islamic republics at one time but are no more.
Parliamentary republic	Republics, like India or Singapore, with an elected head of state, but where the head of state and head of government are kept separate with the head of government retaining most executive powers, or a head of state akin to a head of government, elected by a parliament.
Presidential republic	Republics with an elected head of state, where the head of state is also the head of the government. Examples include the United States, Mexico, Brazil, South Africa and Indonesia.
People's republic	Republics that include countries like China and Vietnam that are de jure governed for and by the people. The term People's Republic is used to differentiate themselves from the earlier republic of their countries before the people's revolution, like the Republic of China.
Semi-presidential republic	A semi-presidential republic is a government system with power divided between a president as head of state and a prime minister as head of government, used in countries like France, Haiti, Portugal, the DR Congo and Egypt. The president, elected by the people, symbolizes national unity and foreign policy while the prime minister is appointed by the president or elected by the parliament and handles daily administration. The term semi-presidential distinguishes this system from presidential and parliamentary systems.
Directorial republic	A directorial republic is a government system with power divided among a college of several people who jointly exercise the powers of a head of state and/or a head of government.
Merchant republic	In the early Renaissance, a number of small, wealthy, trade-based city-states embraced republican ideals, notably across Italy and the Baltic. In general, these mercantile republics arose in regions of Europe where feudal control by an absolutist monarchy was minimal or absent completely. In these mercantile republics, the leaders were elected by the citizenry with the primary duty of increasing the city-state's collective wealth.

== Forms of government by socio-economic attributes ==
=== By socio-economic attributes ===
Many political systems can be described as socioeconomic ideologies. Experience with those movements in power and the strong ties they may have to particular forms of government can cause them to be considered as forms of government in themselves.

These categories are not exclusive.

Term	Definition
Anarchism	A system that advocates self-governed societies based on voluntary institutions. These are often described as stateless societies, although several authors have defined them more specifically as institutions based on non-hierarchical or free associations, while others have advocated for stateless societies with the inclusion of private property, property rights and hierarchical groups, so long as membership and association with those groups are entirely voluntary. Anarchism holds the state to be undesirable, unnecessary and/or harmful.
Capitalism	A system in which the means of production (machines, tools, factories, etc.) are owned by private individuals, workers then negotiate with those individuals to use those means of production in exchange for a portion of what they produce, usually in the form of capital (money). The owners of the means of production are entitled to whatever portion of the products of the workers' labor that is agreed upon by the two parties.
Colonialism	A system in which a native group (or their lands and resources) is subjugated by an external political power for their own economic and/or political benefit.
Communism	A socialist system in which the means of production are commonly owned (either by the people directly, through the commune, or by a communist state or society), and production is undertaken for use, rather than for profit. Communist society or party like China and Vietnam, in theory, stateless, classless, moneyless, — it is usually regarded as the "final form" of a socialist or anarchist society.
Despotism	A system in which the laws and resources of a nation are controlled by one individual, usually a monarch or dictator, who holds absolute political power. Examples include the pharaohs of Ancient Egypt, the Roman emperors and the North Korean supreme leaders.
Distributism	A variant of capitalism which views widespread property ownership as fundamental right; the means of production are spread as widely as possible rather than being centralized under the control of the state (as in state socialism), or a few individuals/corporations (as in what proponents of distributism call "crony capitalism") Distributism fundamentally opposes socialism and capitalism, which distributists view as equally flawed and exploitative. In contrast, distributism seeks to subordinate economic activity to human life as a whole, to our spiritual life, our intellectual life, our family life".
Feudalism	A system of land ownership and duties common to Medieval Europe and Feudal Japan. Under feudalism, all the land in a kingdom belonged to the king or emperor. However, the king/emperor would give some of the land to the lords or nobles who fought for him. These presents of land were called manors. Then the nobles gave some of their land to vassals. The vassals then had to do duties for the nobles. The lands of vassals were called fiefs. A similar system is the Iqta‘, used by medieval Islamic societies of the middle east and north Africa. This functioned much like the feudal system but generally had titles that weren't granted to a family dynasty but to individuals at the behest of the sultan and generally only required a tax from the lower classes, instead of military service and/or manual labour like in the feudal system.
Minarchism	A variant of capitalism which advocates for the state to exist solely to provide a very small number of services. A popular model of the State proposed by minarchists is known as the night-watchman state, in which the only governmental functions are to protect citizens from aggression, theft, breach of contract, and fraud as defined by property laws, limiting it to three institutions: the military, the police, and courts.
Monarchism	A system in which the government is headed by an agreed upon head of the nobility who is known as the monarch, usually in the form of a king or emperor (but also less commonly a queen or empress). In most monarchical systems the position of monarch is one inherited from a previous ruler by bloodline or marriage, but in other cases it may be a position elected by the nobility themselves, as was the case in the ancient Roman Kingdom and the medieval Holy Roman Empire.
Republicanism	A system in which the laws and governmental policies of the state are considered a "public matter" and decided by the citizens of the society, whoever they may be. Most modern nation-states are examples of republics, but other examples include those of ancient Rome and Athens.
Socialism	A system in which workers, democratically and/or socially own the means of production. The economic framework may be decentralized and self-managed in autonomous economic units, as in libertarian systems, or centrally planned, as in authoritarian systems. Public services such as healthcare and education would be commonly, collectively, and/or state owned.
Totalitarianism	A system in which opposition is prohibited, civil rights are extremely suppressed and virtually all aspects of social life, including the economy, morals, public and private lives of citizens, are controlled by a centralized authoritarian state that holds absolute political power, usually under a dictatorship or single political party. Five examples are the Soviet Union (1927–53), Nazi Germany (1933–1945), Islamic Emirate of Afghanistan, Eritrea and North Korea.
Tribalism	A system based on a small complex society of varying degrees of centralisation that is led by an individual known as a chief.

=== Types of government by geo-cultural attributes ===
Governments can also be categorized based on their size and scope of influence:

Term	Definition
National government	The government of a nation-state and is a characteristic of a unitary state. This is the same thing as a federal government which may have distinct powers at various levels authorized or delegated to it by its member states, though the adjective 'central' is sometimes used to describe it. The structure of central governments varies. Many countries have created autonomous regions by delegating powers from the central government to governments at a sub national level, such as a regional, state or local level. Based on a broad definition of a basic political system, there are two or more levels of government that exist within an established territory and govern through common institutions with overlapping or shared powers as prescribed by a constitution or other law.
City-state	A sovereign state, also described as a type of small independent country, that usually consists of a single city and its dependent territories. Historically, this included cities such as Rome, Athens, Carthage, and the Italian city-states during the Renaissance. Today only a handful of sovereign city-states exist, with some disagreement as to which are city-states. A great deal of consensus exists that the term properly applies currently to Hong Kong, Macau, Singapore, Monaco, and Vatican City. City states are also sometimes called micro-states which however also includes other configurations of very small countries.
Commune	From the Medieval Latin communia. An intentional community of people living together, sharing common interests, often having common values and beliefs, as well as shared property, possessions, resources, and, in some communes, work, income or assets.
Intergovernmental organisations	Also known as international governmental organizations (IGOs): the type of organization most closely associated with the term 'international organization', these are organizations that are made up primarily of sovereign states (referred to as member states). Notable examples include the United Nations (UN), Organisation of Islamic Conference (OIC), Organization for Security and Co-operation in Europe (OSCE), Council of Europe (COE), International Labour Organization (ILO) and International Police Organization (INTERPOL). The UN has used the term "intergovernmental organization" instead of "international organization" for clarity.
World government	The notion of a common political authority for all of humanity, yielding a global government and a single state that exercises authority over the entire Earth. Such a government could come into existence either through violent and compulsory world domination or through peaceful and voluntary supranational union.

== Forms of government by other attributes ==
=== By significant constitutional attributes ===
Certain major characteristics are defining of certain types; others are historically associated with certain types of government.

- Civilian control of the military vs. stratocracy
- Majority rule or parliamentary sovereignty vs. bill of rights or arbitrary rules with separation of powers and supermajority rules to prevent tyranny of the majority and protect minority rights
- Rule according to higher law (unwritten ethical principles) vs. written constitutionalism
- Separation of church and state or free church vs. state religion
- Totalitarianism or authoritarianism vs. libertarianism
- Rival government

=== By approach to regional autonomy ===
This list focuses on differing approaches that political systems take to the distribution of sovereignty, and the autonomy of regions within the state.

- Sovereignty located exclusively at the centre of political jurisdiction
  - Empire
- Sovereignty located at the centre and in peripheral areas
  - Federal monarchy
  - Hegemony
- Diverging degrees of sovereignty
  - Alliance
  - Asymmetrical federalism
  - Chartered company
  - Client state
    - Associated state
    - Dependent territory
    - Protectorate
    - Puppet state
    - Satellite state
    - Vassal state
  - Colony
    - Crown colony
  - Commonwealth
  - Corpus separatum
  - Decentralisation and devolution (powers redistributed from central to regional or local governments)
  - Federacy
  - Junta
  - Mandate
  - Military frontier
  - Neutral zone
  - Non-self-governing territories
  - Occupied territory
  - Provisional government
  - Thalassocracy
  - Unrecognized state
    - Government in exile
    - Micronation
    - Separatist movement
    - States with limited recognition

=== Theoretical and speculative attributes ===
These have no conclusive historical or current examples outside of speculation and scholarly debate.

Term	Definition
Corporate republic	Theoretical form of government occasionally hypothesised in works of science fiction, though some historical nations such as medieval Florence might be said to have been governed as corporate republics. The colonial megacorporations such as the Dutch East India Company should possibly be considered corporate states, being semi-sovereign with the power to wage war and establish colonies. While retaining some semblance of republican government, a corporate republic would be run primarily like a business, involving a board of directors and executives. Utilities, including hospitals, schools, the military, and the police force, would be privatised. The social welfare function carried out by the state is instead carried out by corporations in the form of benefits to employees. Although corporate republics do not exist officially in the modern world, they are often used in works of fiction or political commentary as a warning of the perceived dangers of unbridled capitalism. In such works, they usually arise when a single, vastly powerful corporation deposes a weak government, over time or in a coup d'état. Some political scientists have also considered state socialist nations to be forms of corporate republics, with the state assuming full control of all economic and political life and establishing a monopoly on everything within national boundaries – effectively making the state itself amount to a giant corporation.
Collective consciousness	Rule by a collective consciousness of all human minds connected via some form of technological telepathy acting as a form of supercomputer to make decisions based on shared patterned experiences to deliver fair and accurate decisions to problems as they arrive. Also known as the hive mind principle, it differs from voting in that each person would make a decision while in the hive—the synapses of all minds work together following a longer path of memories to make one decision. See technological singularity.
Secret society	A secret society (cryptocracy, secret government, shadow government, or invisible government) is a club or organization whose activities, events, inner functioning, or membership are concealed. As a form of government, secret societies are a theoretical government in which real and actual political power resides with private individuals who make decisions behind the scenes, while publicly elected representatives serve as puppets or scapegoats. Probably the most infamous secret society is the Illuminati, who had in their general statutes, "The order of the day is to put an end to the machinations of the purveyors of injustice, to control them without dominating them." Secret societies are illegal in several countries, including Italy and Poland, who ban secret political parties and political organizations in their constitutions. Secret societies are often portrayed in fiction settings. Some examples from popular culture include: The Assassins and Templars in Assassin's Creed franchise by Ubisoft; SPECTRE, in the James Bond Franchise; HYDRA, in the Marvel Universe; The Bene Gesserit and Bene Tleilax from Frank Herbert's Dune
Theonomy	A hypothetical Christian form of government in which society is ruled by divine law. Theonomists hold that divine law, particularly the judicial laws of the Old Testament, should be observed by modern societies. The chief architects of the movement are Gary North, Greg Bahnsen, and R.J. Rushdoony.
Magocracy	Rule by a government with the highest authority composed entirely or primarily of magicians, sages, sorcerers, wizards, witches, or some other magic users. A magocracy consists of a ruling class that uses magic as a centerpiece of their political power. Magocracies can exist as a government of mages ruling over other mages, or as mages ruling over non-magical persons. Magocracies are portrayed primarily in fiction and fantasy settings. Some examples from popular culture include: The Jedi Council from Star Wars; The Order of the Phoenix in the Harry Potter series by J. K. Rowling; The Ministry of Magic from Wizarding World; The Aes Sedai of the Wheel of Time series; The Brotherhood of Sorcerers in the Witcher series, which is also a secret society
Synthetic Technocracy	Rule by specialist AI experts in a given domain. AI technocrats are assumed to have two major advantages over human technocrats: fairness and comprehensiveness. All forms of human government are seen as inherently flawed, due to the tribalism, jingoism and irrational emotional nature of humankind. Synthetic technocracy bills itself as dispassionate and rational, free of the strife of political parties and factions as it pursues its optimal ends. Following in the tradition of other meritocracy theories, synthetic technocrats assume full state control over political and economic issues. Synthetic technocracy is portrayed primarily in science fiction settings. Examples from popular culture include Gaia in Appleseed

== See also ==
- List of countries by system of government
- List of political ideologies
