= History of Raëlism =

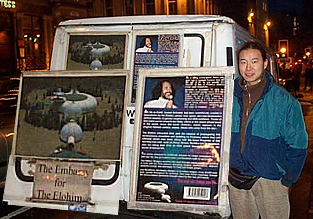
Raëlian Messages on van

Throughout the history of Raëlism, members of the Raëlian Movement have advocated the use of sex-positive feminism, condoms, birth control, masturbation, meditation, genetically modified organisms, and human cloning. In the past, projects such as Clonaid, for human cloning, and Clitoraid, for repairing genitally mutilated clitorises, have been founded. Raëlians are also believers of the Raëlian movement's version of its history as described in the books written by Claude Vorilhon.

== Early years ==
The beginnings of Raëlian history goes back to the history of Raël, which concerns the origins of Raël, his personage, and his works, which developed from Claude Vorilhon. The personage began as the result of encounters described in Raëlian Messages, mainly from The Book Which Tells the Truth (1974) and Extraterrestrials Took Me to their Planet (1975).

Raëlian books are a primary source of Raël's history. Translated portions of the original text are distributed freely worldwide in 36 languages on the Internet. Some of the books include the contents of multiple Raëlian books and have testimonials, footnotes, updates, and hyperlinks appended to them. In addition to the Raëlian books, a Canadian sociologist named Susan J. Palmer writes about Raël's struggle to organize the young Raëlian movement.

=== The foundations ===
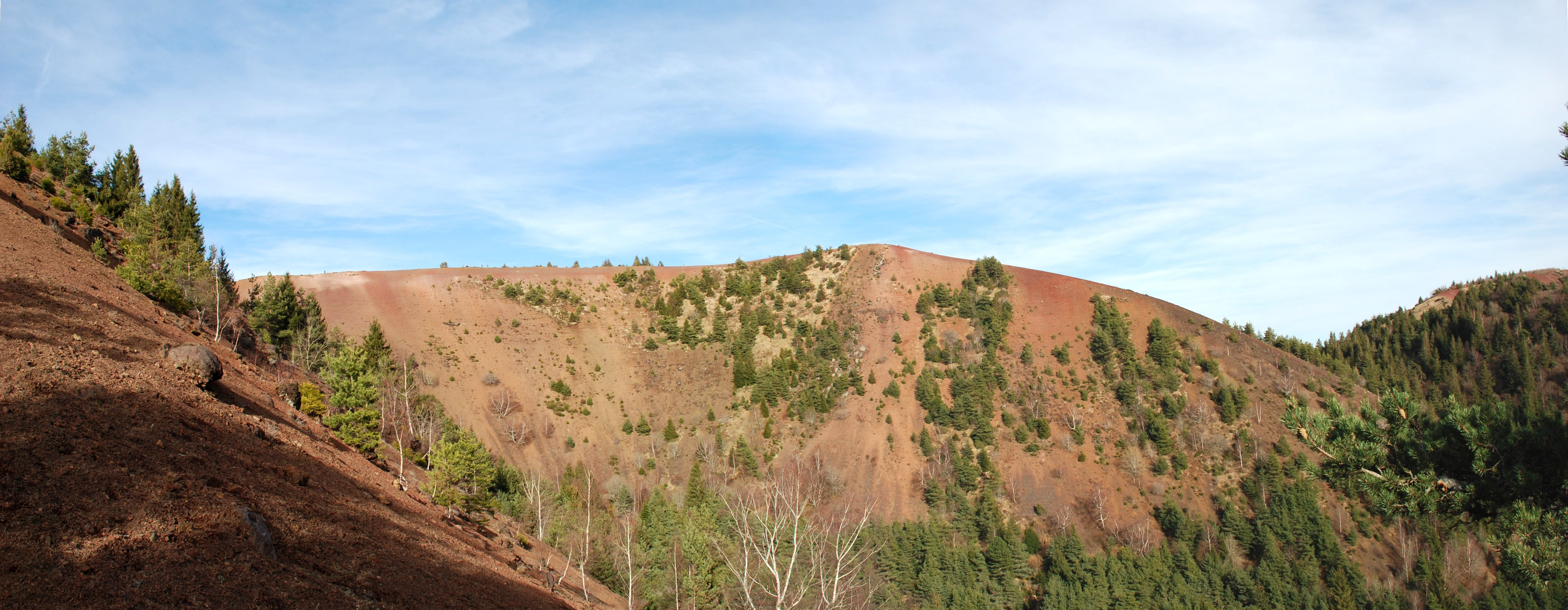
Puy de Lassolas

All of the following are said to have happened to Claude Vorilhon in Raëlian belief:

On the morning of 13 December 1973 (Julian Date 2442029), he had his first meeting with an extraterrestrial humanoid- an Eloha (plural: Elohim), who landed a UFO within an inactive volcano called Puy de Lassolas near the capital of Auvergne, France (Clermont-Ferrand).

Two days later, in a third meeting, an Eloha referred to similar insignias: one engraved on his spaceship and one on his spacesuit. Both formed by interlocked triangles which, according to the Eloha, means "as above, so below", enclosing a swastika which means "all is cyclic in infinite time". In Raëlism, the swastika symbolizes "The choice between paradise, which the peaceful use of science makes possible, and the hell of returning to the primitive stage where humanity submits to nature instead of dominating and benefiting from it." This is the original emblem of the Raëlian Movement which is used primarily in the African and Asian continents.

Three days later, Claude Vorilhon met Yahweh Elohim for the last time that year on a Tuesday. On that day, Vorilhon was given the name for the religious movement which he was to establish. The six-letter name is "MADECH", which stands for "mouvement pour l'accueil des Elohim créateurs de l'humanité" or "movement for welcoming the Elohim, creators of humanity". It also stands for "Moise a devancé Elie et le Christ" meaning "Moses preceded Elijah and the Christ". The "New Commandments" presented to him on that Tuesday concerned the establishment of Geniocracy, Humanitarianism, World Government, and his mission to catalyze these endeavors and to hasten the return of the Elohim to Earth.

=== Founding ===
On 19 September 1974, Claude Vorilhon held his first public conference in Paris, France, which attracted more than 2000 people. Soon after, Raël founded and began to establish MADECH. On 13 December, this was brought into fruition as 170 MADECH members gathered at Puy de Lassolas and formed an organization of "a president, a treasurer, and a secretary" who each signed a 10,000 franc check payable toward the publication of the first Raëlian book.

Susan J. Palmer commented that in UFO platform societies like the MADECH organization, there was no obligation of membership and commitment like those found in cults, but rather, an open place where people could freely exchange their opinions and relate their experiences on the subject of UFOs. Only the first Raëlian book had surfaced at the time, and Palmer says it had consisted largely of a "creation myth and eschatology", but it had "no rituals, no priesthood, no experiential dimension, and no coherent system of ethics" which would lead to an organized movement that had any chance of committing to large projects guided by a leader.

At the Place de la République in March 1975, Claude Vorhilon staged a purging of leaders who he believed hampered his own creativity. In the following month, Claude Vorhilon called for a meeting of the MADECH organization, which was held at its headquarters in Paris. As MADECH's president, Vorhilon conducted the meeting with the intention to rid the organization from the kind of pseudoscience that contradicted his physicalism. In addition to this, the MADECH officials had an increasing desire to blend-in with the rest of the ufologists and trekkies, and were becoming less interested in the Raëlian concept of Elohim extraterrestrials. A schism was becoming more apparent among the officials, and subsequently Vorilhon dismissed all of them. Their positions were replaced by an inner circle of seven people, whose mission was to inform the public of the Raëlian messages, and to raise funds for building an embassy for extraterrestrials. Vorilhon said that he resigned as president of MADECH by that June, because it seemed to him that MADECH could survive on its own, and that he had made a mistake by structuring it into a form that he likened to a "petanque club or a war veterans' association". Vorilhon then spoke of a personal desire to settle in the countryside, and write an autobiography of events that happened prior to his purported extraterrestrial encounters that began on 13 December 1973.

=== Additional foundations ===
In his book Intelligent Design, Raël discussed the following events occurred:

On 31 July 1975, along with his wife Marie-Paul and a devoted MADECH member- François, Raël sighted a UFO near his new home in the countryside near Clermont-Ferrand, the town that he previously had lived in. The glowing craft performed aerial start-and-go maneuvers along a zigzag path. Raël thought that this was a verification that the new location that he and his wife were now living in was the right place and time.

He said that on 7 October 1975, an hour before midnight, after having a sudden urge to observe the night sky, he decided to go to Roc Plat, an uninhabited place between two brooks surround by a forest. A spacecraft suddenly landed and shone a bright light behind a bush. He then met the same extraterrestrial from his first encounter on 13 December 1973. After a few words, he was taken up in that spacecraft with the Eloha and sent to a remote base relatively close to the Solar System where he was given a resort-style relaxation treatment including an organic breakfast and over an hour in a Jacuzzi of warm blue liquid, slightly thicker than water.

On the morning of 8 October, Rael sat mesmerized and listened to a 3-hour lecture from Yahweh Elohim about his religions and philosophers, the need for geniocracy, Hinduism, Islam, and Buddhism, and about the ideas of divinity and souls, and later traveled to the Planet of the Eternals. The planet orbited around a very large star and had a climate similar to the rain forests of Earth. He later sat down with the Eloha and had a meal with the major prophets, including Buddha, Moses, Jesus, and Mohammed. A guide showed him installations that housed machines for creating biological robots. He gave a picture of his mother to a machine which created similarly appearing biological robots. That night, he received an introduction to build his future home at the Planet of the Eternals and was presented young, mature female biological robots. He said that before reaching a climax, he wore a helmet which played music controlled by his thoughts, which the females danced to. Then the climax happens.

He said that on the morning of 9 October, he took a scented bath and that soon after, Yahweh Elohim (an extraterrestrial) presented Claude Vorilhon to a machine which maximized his faculties. Yahweh Elohim then gave advice to him, the one who has become Claude Raël. Claude Raël then spent a few more hours on the planet, doing yoga and being given a long guided meditation session, and enjoyed what that world had to offer while he was there, including meeting with the past messengers of the Elohim. By midnight of 10 October (Julian Date 2442695), 666 days after the first meeting with the Elohim and minutes after the last one, Claude Raël is back on Roc Plat. His entire experience has taken exactly 72 hours.

He said that in the afternoon of 7 October 1976, at la Negrerie of France, fifty Raëlians witnessed cotton-like substances falling from the sky which Raël said has a historical relationship to manna. Raël said that manna was a pulverized synthetic chemical food made by the Elohim, and that it was sent to Israelites on the ground in similar manner during their journey through an artificial passage in Red Sea formed by a repulsion beam.

=== Geniocratic movement ===
In 1978, Raëlians had a conference for the French press, in which they announced their vision for a worldwide political movement for geniocracy. In March 1978, one of their members was voted onto the city council of Sarlat. However, in December of the previous year- 1977, the non-democratic nature of the geniocratic model of government, and the classification of Raëlians as a cult by the government of France, and the fact that the Raëlian logo contains a swastika, were used as grounds by France's state police to seize documents from Raël's home, and from the homes of other Raëlians.

== Middle years ==
=== Claude Raël travels around the world ===
From 1980 to 1992, Raël and his movement became increasingly global. Beginning from 1980, Claude Raël's fifth Raëlian book Sensual Meditation was published for the first time and formal publication of the Raëlian Messages in the Japanese language began as part of the Raëlian mission to Japan. Two years later, Africa became another target area in the mission to spread the Raëlian messages. In May 1983, Claude Raël visited a famous landmark that survived the atomic bombing at Hiroshima, Japan, known as the Hiroshima Peace Memorial.

At sundown in 1986, in a restaurant next to Villa Pamphilli park—just outside Vatican City—Raël began claiming to members that he was the true pope and played a guitar hymn about extraterrestrials. In 1990, Australians became the next Raëlian target, and in 1992, Canada's Raëlians purchased 115 hectares near Valcourt, Quebec, for a series of summer seminars in North America, and their leader gave it the name "Le Jardin du Prophète" (The Prophet's Gardens).

=== First wave of sexual advocacy ===
Quebec remained as the epicenter for Raëlian campaigns and testing of experimental ideas. In December 1992, a project, called Operation Condom, was launched in response to a veto of the Montreal Catholic School Commission against the installation of high school condom vending machines. A mobile condom vendor— a pink van dubbed the "condom-mobile", was orchestrated by a Raëlian, who advocated the notion that extraterrestrial Elohim wanted the teens to live a long life of pleasure, and criticized the commission by quoting statistics about teen pregnancies and sexually transmitted diseases. About 10,000 condoms were distributed.

In Montreal, on 7 July 1993, a conference about masturbation entitled "Yes to Self-Love" was hosted by Betty Dodson, Raël, and a Raëlian bishop. Betty Dodson, who came to Montreal the previous month, spoke about her dream of a worldwide masturbation campaign for the 2000 New Year's celebration. Raël described his doctrine about self-love, saying that it is how people become linked to the cosmos, while Daniel Chabot— a local college psychology professor, spoke about the psychological benefits of masturbation. Chabot's statements, along with his status within the sect, and his purported use of his psychological credentials to attract new recruits, led to some controversy with a corporation. The corporation won the suit, but was ultimately charged by Chabot.

=== FIREPHIM ===
In 1992, Raël founded FIREPHIM (French: Fédération internationale des religions et philosophies minoritaire, lit. 'International Federation of Minority Religions and Philosophies'), which according to Raël aimed to "protect the rights of religious, philosophical, sexual, and racial minorities". This resulted from the death of a friend of Raël, Jean Miguères, who was assassinated after the anti-cult group AFDI had declared him a cult leader. Simultaneously he wrote a book denouncing the French justice system, Le Racisme religieux financé en France par le gouvernement socialiste (transl. Religious racism sponsored in France by the Socialist government).

FIREPHIM became defunct in 2000, replaced by a different group, CAP (French: Coordination des Associations et Particuliers pour la Liberté de Conscience) which served a similar purpose.

=== Raël's return to racing ===
In 1994, rich Japanese Raëlians rented a race car and showed it to Claude Vorilhon. They believed that it would generate publicity for the movement. Claude accepted the offer on the condition that the funding must not come from member tithes or embassy funding. So the funding of Raël's races which took place in the 1990s and early 2000s came mostly from well funded European and Japanese people.

=== Calls for religious and tax-exempt status ===
On 7 October 1994, Raëlians began implementing their own version of baptism in front of a baptismal font inside of St. Peter's Basilica. However, in response to Catholics' complaints, Vatican guards forced the Raëlians to the exit gates of the city. In the same week, Raël purportedly handed a copy of his book Le Livre qui dit la vérité to Pope John Paul II.

In March 1995, the Raëlians attained religious-corporation status in Quebec, and were therefore eligible to apply for federal tax exemption in Canada. However, the tax department rejected the application, because Raëlism does not meet the requirement of religions that they believe in transcendental and immaterial beings. Raëlians made an appeal, which was likewise rejected. However, in the United States, the Raëlians' attempt to achieve tax-exempt status was successful.

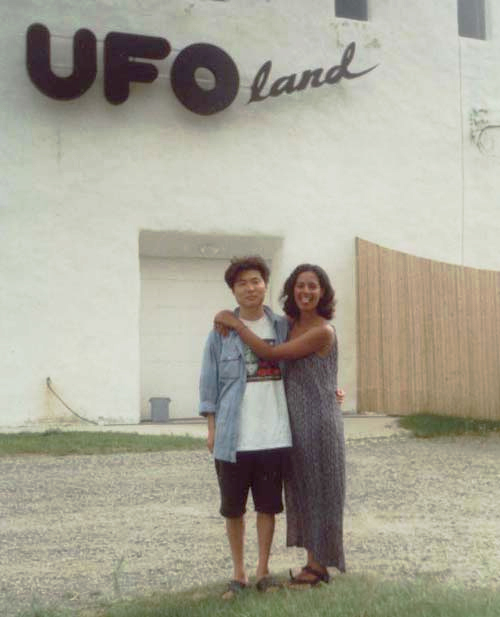
Raëlians at UFOland

== Recent years ==
=== Museum for the paranormal ===
In August 1997, UFOland—built by the Raëlians as the largest structure in North America made out of bales of hay—opened on their Valcourt estate. Its purpose was to inform the public about the Raëlian interpretation of the UFO phenomenon and to attract funds for the Raëlian Foundation. The first room served as an attraction for their proposed Raëlian embassy for extraterrestrials. Audio visual presentations in six other rooms displayed teachings about the Raëlian message, sightings, and government cover-ups concerning UFOs. In 2001, UFOland was closed to the public. The reason given by the director for UFOland was that the revenue did not justify the costs—including two-hour trips from Montreal.

=== Anti-clerical campaigns ===
In July 2001, Raëlians on the streets attracted Italians and Swiss people as they gave leaflets in protest to over a hundred child molesters in existence among Roman Catholic clergy in France. They recommended that parents should not send their children to Catholic confession. The Episcopal vicar of Geneva sued the Raëlian Church for libel but did not win. The judge did not accept the charges for the reason that the Raëlians were not attacking the whole of the Catholic Church.

In October 2002, Raëlians in a Canadian anti-clerical parade held handed out Christian crosses to high school students. They were invited to burn the crosses in a park not far from Montreal's Mount Royal and to sign letters of apostasy from the Roman Catholic Church. The Quebec Association of Bishops called this "incitement to hatred", and several school boards attempted to prevent their students from meeting Raëlians.

=== Advocacy ===
On 26 December 2002, Brigitte Boisselier, a Raëlian Bishop and CEO of a biotechnology company called Clonaid, announced the birth of baby Eve, a human clone, which at that point ignited much media attention, ethical debate, doubt, critics, and claims of a hoax. Spokespeople for the movement, such as Claude Vorilhon, have suggested that this is only first step in achieving a more important agenda, saying that accelerated growth process and mind transfer, in combination with cloning are mechanisms by which eternal life may be achieved.

According to the Japan Today of 10 February 2003, that Sunday, about sixty Raëlians celebrated with banners celebrating the purported birth of the first cloned babies: 1) a baby girl named Eve, 2) a daughter and clone of a Dutch lesbian, 3) a son and clone of a Japanese male. The small parade event began at Hiroshima Station and ended at Hiroshima Peace Memorial Park. In the article, figures by the observers and a representative of the movement suggest that one percent of Japan's Raëlians participated in the event.

On 6 August 2003, the first day of Raëlian year 58 AH, a tech article on the USA Today newspaper mentions an "unlikely ally" of the Monsanto Company, the Raëlian Movement of Brazil. The movement gave vocal support in response to the company's support for genetically modified organisms, particularly in their country. Brazilian farmers have been using Monsanto's genetically engineered soy plant as well as the glyphosate herbicide to which it was artificially adapted. The Raëlians spoke against the Brazilian government's ban on GMOs.

The Raëlian Movement promoted 2004 as the "year of atheism". On 11 December 2004, Raëlians marched in the Atheist Convention in Rome. One of them said, "[Just as] children need to understand that there is no Santa, people need to realize there is no God." In YouTube, Raëlians have posted videos in denial of the Holy Spirit in response to the Blasphemy Challenge. Despite their anti-religious leaning, Raëlians—who are philosophical materialists—believe that a trained mind can achieve telepathic communication with extraterrestrial Elohim.

"The group of UFO believers wants to clone its most beautiful members"—the Raëlians—appeared in the October 2004 issue of Playboy magazine. On 12 April 2005, Raël and a few of his partners had a meeting with Playboy magazine founder Hugh Hefner at his Playboy Mansion and were photographed in issue 269 of the Raëlian Contact newsletter.

=== Africa ===
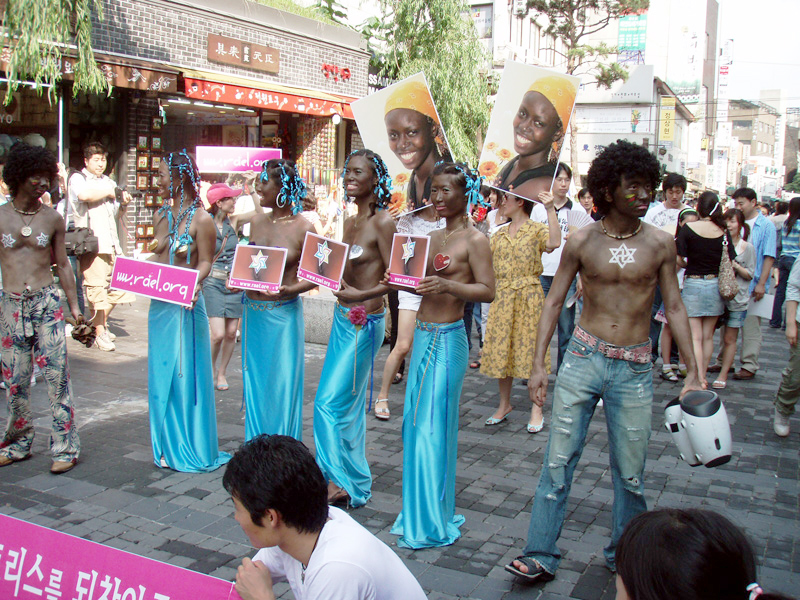
Clitoraid event in South Korea with Koreans wearing brown face and body makeup.

In 2006, the Raëlian Movement vocally advocated the concept of a "United States of Africa" following a more honest and complete decolonization that would involve the disbanding of corrupt rulerships as a result of Africans returning to their non-Christian ancestors' religious and territorial roots, which existed before colonization by Europeans. However, Raëlians later emphasized that the word "Africa" was colonial in origin, so on 28 December, an article in Raëlian Contact 325 suggested a different name: The United Kingdoms of Kama.

In the same year, the Raëlian Movement founded a public fundraising effort, Clitoraid, to pay for repairs of clitorises, especially for women in Africa where excision is rampant. In January 2007, representatives of the organization raised funds for the cause at the AVN Adult Entertainment Expo in Las Vegas, Nevada.

=== Relocation of the North American headquarters ===
In February 2007, the Raëlian Movement put up for sale the UFOland headquarters compound near the small village of Maricourt, Quebec, for $2.95 million (Can.). Their intention was to shift the headquarters to somewhere in the southern United States, possibly to Palm Springs, California.

In May 2007, the Canadian retreat was sold. The Raëlian Movement relocated their North American headquarters to Las Vegas, Nevada. Ricky Roehr, the President of the Raëlian Movement in the United States, said the Raëlians chose Las Vegas because they thought that it was a happy and open-minded community. The Raëlians planned to build a place or buy and renovate a hotel in order to conduct their seminars.

=== Members leaving after false claims of plagiarism ===
In November 2009, Wonjune Lee, an eleven-year member of the Raëlian movement, came across information regarding works of fiction that were published by Jean Sendy, a prominent ufologist and French author. Particular passages in one of Sendy's works, "Those gods who made heaven & earth", published in 1969, were paralleled with particular passages in the Raëlian book The book which tells the truth, published in 1974. Although review of the fundamental differences between the work of Sendy and Raël is quite clear. Sendy like many of his contemporaries hypothesized that human evolution had some form of intervention from extraterrestrials, where as Raël's message states that human beings did not evolve but were created by the extraterrestrials (Elohim) using the matter found on earth. Also the concept of infinity as described by Raël is unique.

== See also ==
- Raëlian beliefs and practices
