= They Saved Lisa's Brain =

- The Simpsons episode
- Episode no.: Season 10; Episode 22
- Directed by: Pete Michels
- Written by: Matt Selman
- Production code: AABF18
- Original air date: May 9, 1999

Guest appearance
- Stephen Hawking as himself

Episode features
- Chalkboard gag: "No one wants to hear from my armpits" (recycled from "Home Sweet Homediddly-Dum-Doodily")
- Couch gag: The couch is sunk by an iceberg and only Maggie stays afloat.
- Commentary: Mike Scully; Matt Selman; Ron Hauge; Rich Appel; Marc Wilmore; Pete Michels

Episode chronology
← Previous "Monty Can't Buy Me Love"	Next → "Thirty Minutes over Tokyo"
- The Simpsons season 10

"They Saved Lisa's Brain" is the twenty-second and penultimate episode of the tenth season of the American animated television series The Simpsons. It first aired on Fox in the United States on May 9, 1999. In the episode, after writing a thoughtful letter to the Springfield Shopper, Lisa is invited to join the Springfield chapter of Mensa. When Mayor Quimby later flees Springfield, the group takes control of the town, hoping to improve the lives of Springfieldians through the rule of the smartest. Meanwhile, Homer poses for a series of erotic photos.

"They Saved Lisa's Brain" was directed by Pete Michels and written by Matt Selman, although the idea for the episode was pitched by former staff writer George Meyer. It featured the first official appearance of Lindsey Naegle and was the first episode in which theoretical physicist and cosmologist Stephen Hawking guest-starred as himself. The Simpsons staff wanted Hawking to guest-star because they needed someone who would be smarter than all of Springfield's Mensa members, and because they had heard that he was a fan of the show. The episode features references to Star Trek, painter Vincent van Gogh and architect Frank Lloyd Wright, and mentions the theory of the universe being toroidal, meaning shaped as a doughnut. At the end of the episode, during the Gracie Films logo, Homer yelled, “Larry Flint is right! You guys stink!”

In its original broadcast, "They Saved Lisa's Brain" was seen by approximately 6.8 million viewers, a very low amount for the series.

== Plot ==
A low-fat pudding, Grandma Plopwell's, is the sponsor of a Springfield gross-out contest that promises a luxurious trip to the winner. Many Springfield residents enter the contest, but things do not go well when one of the judges, Rainier Wolfcastle, declares himself the winner for "being seen with you freaks". The contest ends in a riot and Lisa is hit in the face twice with pudding. She denounces Springfield for its anti-intellectualism in an open letter published in the Springfield Shopper. Whilst it is ignored by most of the town, it impresses the Springfield chapter of Mensa.

Lisa joins the local Mensa chapter, alongside Principal Skinner, Comic Book Guy, Dr. Hibbert, Professor Frink, and Lindsay Naegle. After being bullied out of their reserved gazebo at a park by drunks and Chief Wiggum, they fear that Springfield's quality is poor because the city's stupidest residents have power over their civic institutions. The Mensa group goes to confront Mayor Quimby about the gazebo incident, causing him to escape the city when he mistakenly believes the group has evidence about his corruption. The town's charter states that in the absence of the mayor, the town is to be governed by a council of learned citizens.

Now in control of Springfield and governing the town as a geniocracy, the group hopes that things will become much better. Their implemented ideas, including the adoption of metric time and the removal of green lights from stoplights to ease traffic congestion, elevate Springfield above East St. Louis on the list of America's 300 Most Livable Cities. However, the group allows power to go to their heads and the members begin to fight among themselves. Various schemes and their wildly unpopular plans, aired at a public meeting, including the banning of certain sports and the imposition of limits on procreation similar to the act of pon farr from Star Trek, further expose the rifts inside the group.

The Springfield townspeople, wishing power would revert to idiots, surround the intellectuals in an angry mob and bring an end to Mensa's rule. Stephen Hawking appears to see what the Mensa group is up to and makes it clear he is unimpressed. However, he saves Lisa from being seriously injured by the mob. In the end, Hawking and Homer go to Moe's Tavern for a drink.

In the episode's secondary storyline, Homer steals a gift certificate during the post-contest riots and has erotic photos taken of himself as a gift to Marge, who is at first impressed, but becomes distracted by the interior design Homer did in their basement.

== Production ==
"They Saved Lisa's Brain" was written by Matt Selman and directed by Pete Michels. It originally aired on the Fox network in the United States on May 9, 1999. Although the episode's first draft was written by Selman, the idea for the episode was pitched by former staff writer George Meyer. In the episode's setpiece, Homer and Bart participate in a gross out contest, while Marge and Lisa are in the audience. According to Selman, the writers took inspiration from real gross out contests, which were "sweeping the nation" at the time. Before the contest in the episode, the spectators are given free samples of a pudding called Grandma Plopwell's. The name of the pudding was inspired by a brand of pies called Aunt Freshly, which the Simpsons writers usually ate at the time.

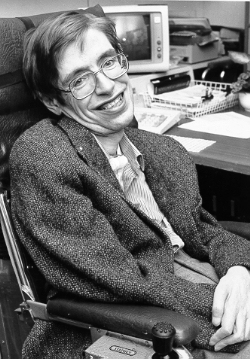
English theoretical physicist and cosmologist Stephen Hawking guest-starred as himself in the episode

The episode features the first official appearance of Lindsey Naegle, a sleazy businesswoman who has since become a recurring character in the series. While different versions of the character had appeared in the series before, namely in the season 8 episode "The Itchy & Scratchy & Poochie Show", the season 9 episode "Girly Edition", and the season 10 episode "Make Room for Lisa", the character's final design was first seen in "They Saved Lisa's Brain". The episode also mentions the character's name for the first time. Naegle's name was partly based on Selman's agent Sue Neagle, and Lindsey was chosen as the first name because Selman thought it sounded "annoying" and "pretentious". Naegle is voiced by Tress MacNeille, who Selman described as a "huge asset" to the series, and stated that she "breathes life" into the character.

"They Saved Lisa's Brain" features English theoretical physicist and cosmologist Stephen Hawking as himself. According to executive producer and current showrunner Al Jean, Hawking was asked to guest-star because "we [they] were looking for someone much smarter than all the Mensa members [in Springfield]", and so they "naturally thought of him". Selman added that the Simpsons staff had heard that Hawking was a fan of the show, and that Hawking's family members wanted him to guest-star. Bill Mann of The Press Democrat argued that Hawking was chosen to guest star in order to boost the series' ratings during the May "sweeps". Mann wrote that "sweeps" are "used to set local TV ad rates for the months ahead".

Hawking recorded his performance in the first week of December 1998. In her book Stephen Hawking: a biography, Kristen Larsen wrote that Hawking almost missed his recording session, as his wheelchair broke down two days before his flight to Los Angeles, where the recording took place. In order to make the necessary repairs, Hawking's graduate assistant Chris Burgoyne, aided by a technician, worked a 36‑hour shift. Hawking was 40 minutes late when he arrived in Los Angeles. When he met the Simpsons staff, he apologized, saying "Sorry for being late." According to Selman, Hawking was very humble regarding the episode's jokes about him, and stated that he "took a lot of shots" at himself. The only note that Hawking gave regarding the script was that he did not want to be portrayed as drunk in the episode's last scene, in which he is discussing astronomy with Homer in Moe's tavern.

Because of his motor neurone disease, Hawking was unable to speak, and he communicated using a custom-made computer. With small movements of his body, Hawking wrote a text onto the computer, which was then spoken by a voice synthesizer. Because of this, Hawking had to write all his lines on his computer, while the staff recorded them by placing a microphone in front of the computer's speaker. "It's easy to do a fake Stephen Hawking in your comedy TV show", Selman said in the DVD commentary for the episode. "Any computer can sound just like his computer, but every line that we wrote for him, he typed in himself and we recorded with our microphones as if it had come out of a regular mouth." Some of Hawking's lines were difficult to record. In particular, the word "Fruitopia" was difficult for Hawking's computer to "put together" correctly, and it "took forever" to make the word sound right from the voice synthesizer.

== Themes and cultural references ==
In their book The Simpsons and Philosophy: The D'oh! of Homer, William Irwin, Mark T. Conard and Aeon J. Skoble wrote that "They Saved Lisa's Brain" in detail explores "the possibility of a utopian alternative to politics as usual in Springfield". They described "They Saved Lisa's Brain" as an "epitome" of The Simpsons' diverse comedic humor, and wrote that it can be "enjoyed in two levels", as both "broad farce" and "intellectual satire". As an example of the episode's farcical humor, they referred to the episode's subplot, which, they wrote, "contains some of the grossest humor in the long history of The Simpsons." At the same time, the episode is "filled" with what they described as "subtle cultural allusions", such as the design of Mensa group's locale, which is based on the house of American architect Frank Lloyd Wright. Likewise, Lisa's challenge to Springfield calls attention to the "cultural limitations of small-town America", while the episode also argues that intellectual disdain for the common man can be carried too far, and theory can "all too easily lose touch with common sense". They also argued that the episode, as well as the series as a whole, offers a kind of intellectual defense of the common man against intellectuals, which they opined "helps explain its popularity and broad appeal [...] ["They Saved Lisa's Brain"] defends the common man against the intellectual, in a way that both the common man and the intellectual can understand and enjoy".

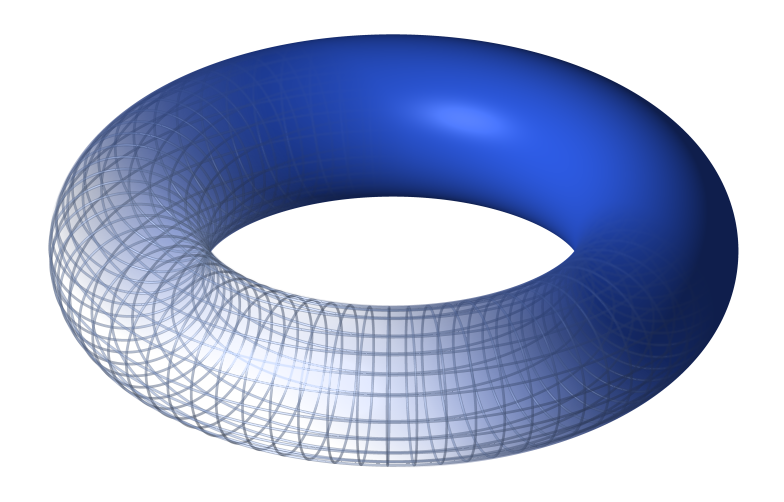
One of Hawking's lines in the episode references the theory that the universe is shaped like a toroid. Shown here is a torus, a type of toroid

In the last scene in the episode, Hawking and Homer are seen discussing the universe in Moe's tavern. Scully stated that the scene was included because it "was a chance to get the world's smartest man and the world's stupidest man in the same place". In the scene, Hawking tells Homer "Your theory of a donut-shaped universe is intriguing... I may have to steal it." In his book What's Science Ever Done For Us?: What The Simpsons Can Teach Us About Physics, Robots, Life and the Universe, Paul Halpern wrote that in mathematics, a "donut-shape", the three-dimensional generalization of a ring, is referred to as a torus. The generalization of a torus, any closed curve spun in a circle around an axis, is called a toroid. According to Halpern, Hawking's line references the fact that there are "genuine" scientific theories that the universe is toroidal.

One of the judges for the gross out contest in the episode's is Madeleine Albright, who was the US Secretary of State at the time the episode was made. During the riot that follows the contest, a travelling exhibition of paintings by Van Gogh is burned to flames. In the episode's subplot, Homer hires a photographer to take erotic pictures of him. The design of the photographer was based on American portrait photographer Annie Leibovitz. The song that plays during the photographing scenes is "I'm Too Sexy" by English pop trio Right Said Fred. During the rules and regulations announcement, Comic Book Guy declares that sexual intercourse will only be permitted once every seven years in Springfield; this is a reference to pon farr, a term used in the Star Trek franchise to describe the psychophysical effect of the estrous cycle that affects the fictional Vulcan race every seven years. His taunting of "I am smart, much smarter than you, Hib-bert!" is also to the tune of the Star Trek fanfare. The episode also mentions actress Geena Davis and cartoonist Mell Lazarus, both of whom are members of Mensa.

== Reception ==
=== Broadcast and controversy ===
In its original American broadcast on May 9, 1999, "They Saved Lisa's Brain" received a 6.8 rating, according to Nielsen Media Research, translating to approximately 6.8 million viewers. It finished in 54th place in the ratings for the week of May 3–9, 1999. The episode's viewership was considered very low by the Boston Herald, who noted that it reached "historic lows" in the ratings.

In a scene in the episode, Comic Book Guy announces that Springfield is in 299th place on a list of the United States' 300 most livable cities, with East St. Louis being in last place. A journalist for a "local East St. Louis paper" noticed this, and called Selman to ask him why they were "taking a shot at East St. Louis". Selman jokingly replied: "because it's a crack-ridden slum". After the interview, he went on vacation in Greece for two weeks. While Selman was on vacation, executive producer and the episode's showrunner Mike Scully received a phone call from The Simpsons publicist Antonia Coffman, who reported that Selman's comment on East St. Louis had been taken "very seriously" by the newspaper. The Simpsons staff received several angry letters from East St. Louis' residents, demanding an apology. Because Selman was out of reach, the other staff members had to take care of the controversy.

When Selman returned, Scully scolded him and told him that he had to apologize to the mayor of East St. Louis, who, unbeknownst to Selman, was portrayed by Marc Wilmore. Wilmore, a former writer on the television comedy The PJ's, had been asked by Scully to participate in a practical joke, in which he would play the mayor of East St. Louis and confront Selman about his controversial statement. According to Selman, Wilmore gave an "Oscar-worthy performance". "I was terrified", he stated in the DVD commentary for the episode, "[we had] a twenty-minute discussion in which [Wilmore] said that [his] children were teased at school [because of Selman's comments], and that the Fox affiliate were gonna be thrown off the air..." According to Wilmore, Selman immediately blamed the other writers. Said Selman, "Well, everyone participates, you know [...] Have you never heard of the word 'collaboration'?" Selman realized the joke when he turned around and saw "all the other writers laughing". "I was so relieved", he said, "I was soaked with sweat [...] I had betrayed my fellow writers, tried to get them in trouble, and they all knew me for the turn-coat that I was."

As compensation for his involvement with the joke, Wilmore was given a role in the season 11 episode "It's a Mad, Mad, Mad, Mad Marge", in which he played a psychologist. In 2002, Wilmore became a writer on The Simpsons.

=== Re-release and critical reception ===
On August 7, 2007, "They Saved Lisa's Brain" was released as part of The Simpsons – The Complete Tenth Season DVD box set. Mike Scully, Matt Selman, Ron Hauge, Rich Appel, Marc Wilmore and Pete Michels participated in the DVD's audio commentary of the episode. Following its home video release, the episode received mixed reviews from critics. Giving the episode a positive review, DVD Town's James Plath described it as one of the season's better episodes. Ian Jane of DVD Talk wrote that, while episodes that revolve around Lisa tend to be "less popular" than others, he considered "They Saved Lisa's Brain" to be "well done". Colin Jacobson of DVD Movie Guide gave the episode a mixed review, writing "I like the fact that 'Brain' pokes some fun at Mensa, one of the more smug, self-congratulatory groups to be found. The show manages a few good laughs as it goes after various pretensions." However, he added that "the show peters out after a while", and that it "never becomes particularly memorable". A reviewer for Currentfilm.com wrote that, while the episode "isn't without its charms", it "just don't hold up very well". Jake MacNeill of Digital Entertainment News wrote that the episode is "great if you think palindromes are funny", and added that it was one of the season's worst episodes. Warren Martyn and Adrian Wood of I Can't Believe It's a Bigger and Better Updated Unofficial Simpsons Guide described it as a "retread" of the season 9 episode "Lisa the Simpson". They wrote "Once we're past the How Low Will You Go show, the episode takes a nose-dive until the last few minutes." They concluded their review by calling the episode "Very, very tedious."

On the other hand, Stephen Hawking's appearance in the episode was acclaimed by critics. Although they generally disliked the episode, Martyn and Wood wrote that Hawking's cameo "saves [the episode] from being very boring". Plath called the performance "very funny", while Jane described it as "great". Hawking reached seventh place in UGO's list of The Simpsons's "Top 11 Guest Stars", and finished in fourteenth place in "The Simpsons 20 best guest voices of all time" by Ryan Stewart of The Boston Phoenix. Stewart wrote that Hawking's line ""Your theory of a doughnut-shaped universe intrigues me, Homer. I may have to steal it" was a "memorable" quote from the episode. Ethan Alter of The Morning Call described Hawking's cameo as one of the series' ten best, and wrote that Hawking's best line in the episode was "I wanted to see your Utopia, but now I see it is more of a Fruitopia." Writing for IGN, Eric Goldman, Dan Iverson and Brian Zoromski placed Hawking at number sixteen on their list "Top 25 Simpsons Guest Appearances". They wrote that he had a "fairly major" role in the episode, and that he had "several great lines".

=== Hawking's response ===
After the episode aired, Hawking told the Simpsons staff that he "loved" all the jokes and in an interview with The Guardian in 2005, he stated that his guest appearances on The Simpsons were "great fun". An action figure based on Hawking's appearance in The Simpsons has been produced, with the figurine's computer screen reading "If you're looking for trouble, you've found it", a line from "They Saved Lisa's Brain". Since "They Saved Lisa's Brain", Hawking has guest-starred three times on The Simpsons. In 2005, he appeared in the season 16 episode "Don't Fear the Roofer"; in 2007, he starred in the season 18 episode "Stop, or My Dog Will Shoot!"; and in 2010, he appeared in the Season 22 premiere "Elementary School Musical".

However, Hawking has also expressed dissatisfaction regarding the impact on his notoriety caused by his appearance in the episode. In a debate with physicist Brian Cox in The Guardian, Hawking was asked what the most common misconception about his work was. He replied, "People think I'm a Simpsons character." Writing for The Daily Telegraph, Peter Hutchison argued that Hawking "feels he is sometimes not properly recognised for his contribution to our understanding of the universe." In his book The book is dead: long live the book, Sherman Young wrote that most people know Hawking from his appearance on The Simpsons, rather than from anything he has written.
