= Raëlian beliefs and practices =

Beliefs of UFO religion

Raëlian beliefs and practices are the concepts and principles of Raëlism, a new religious movement and UFO religion founded in 1974 by Claude Vorilhon, an auto racing journalist who changed his name to "Raël". The followers of the International Raëlian Movement believe in an advanced species of extraterrestrial aliens called Elohim who created life on Earth. Raëlians are individualists who believe in sexual self-determination. As advocates of the universal ethic and world peace, they believe the world would be better if geniuses had an exclusive right to govern in what Raël terms Geniocracy. As believers of life in outer space, they hope that human scientists will follow the path of the Elohim by achieving space travel through the cosmos and creating life on other planets. As believers in the resurrection of Jesus through a scientific cloning process (which includes memory transfer) by the Elohim, they encourage scientific research to extend life through cloning; however, critics outside are doubtful of its possibility.

Active followers of Raëlianism have exhibited their sex-positive feminism and pacifism through outdoor contacts such as parades. The major initiation rite in the Raëlian Church is the baptism, or Transmission of the Cellular Plan, and is enacted by upper-level members in the Raëlian clergy known as guides.

== Beliefs ==
=== Structure of the Universe ===
Raël says that "everything is in everything". He says that, inside the atoms of living things, are living things that are made of atoms, which themselves contain living things that are made of atoms, and so on, to the infinitely small. The universe itself is contained in an atom inside of another universe, and so on, to the infinitely large. Because of the difference of mass, the activity of life inside of a living thing's atoms would undergo many millennia before enough time passes for that living thing to take a single step. Raëlians believe that the universe is infinite, and thus lacks a center. Because of this, one could not imagine where an ethereal soul would go, due to the universe's infinite nature. They believe that infinity exists in time as well as in space, for all levels of life. Some critics believe that rationally it is not possible to connect the chain to infinity, and finally this chain must lead somewhere.

Raëlians believe that humankind would be able to create life on other planets only if humankind is peaceful enough to stop war. In that case, humans could travel the distances between stars and create life on another planet. Progress in terraforming, molecular biology, and cloning would enable these teams to create continents and life from scratch. Progress in social engineering would ensure that this creation would have a better chance of both surviving and having the potential to understand its creators. Research on how civilization would occur on another planet would allow scientists to decide what traces of their origin should be left behind so that their role in life creation would someday be revealed. The progress achieved by the science teams would ultimately sustain a perpetual chain of life.

=== Intelligent Design ===
==== Creation of life on Earth by extraterrestrials ====
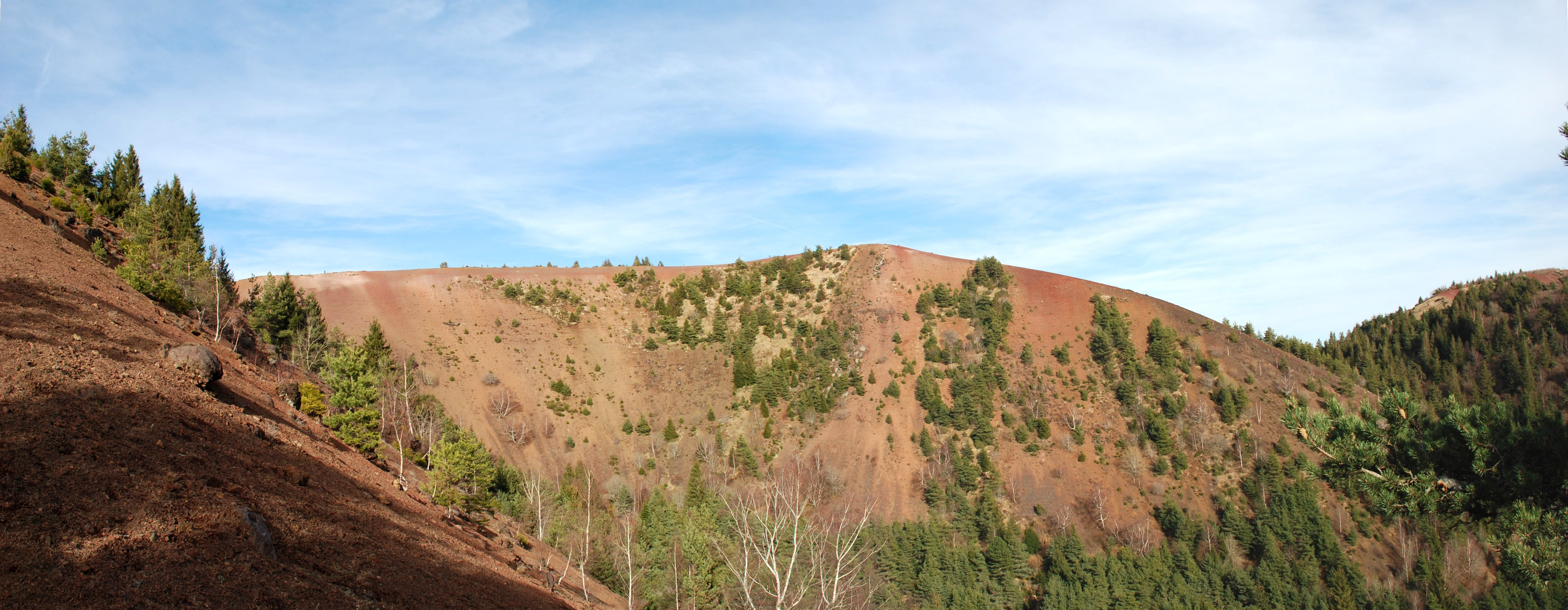
Puy de Lassolas

In his book The Message Given to me by Extraterrestrials (now republished as Intelligent Design: Message from the Designers 2006 ISBN 2-940252-20-3), Vorilhon claims that on 13 December 1973, he found a spacecraft shaped like a flattened bell that landed inside Puy de Lassolas, a volcano near the capital city of Auvergne. A 25,000-year-old human-like extraterrestrial inside the spacecraft named Yahweh said that Elohim was the name that primitive people of Earth called members of his extraterrestrial race, who were seen as "those who came from the sky". Yahweh explained that Earth was originally void of land, but the Elohim came, broke apart the clouds, exposed the seas to sunlight, built a continent, and synthesized a global ecosystem. Solar astronomy, terraformation, nanotechnology, and genetic engineering allowed Elohim to adapt life to Earth's thermal and chemical makeup.

Yahweh gave materialistic explanations of the Garden of Eden, a large laboratory that was based on an artificially constructed continent; Noah's Ark, a spaceship that preserved DNA that was used to resurrect animals through cloning; the Tower of Babel, a rocket that was supposed to reach the creators' planet; and the Great Flood, the byproduct of a nuclear missile explosion that the Elohim sent. After tidal wave floods following the explosions receded, Elohim scattered the Israelites and had them speak the language of other tribes.

According to Vorilhon, Elohim contacted about forty people to act as their prophets on Earth, including Moses, Elijah, Ezekiel, Buddha, John the Baptist, Jesus, Muhammad, and Joseph Smith. The religions thought to be from Elohimic origins include Judaism, Buddhism, Christianity, Islam, and Mormonism.

According to Vorilhon, multiple religious texts indicate that the Elohim would return at the age of Apocalypse or Revelation (unveiling of the truth). Humans from another world would appear to drop down from the sky, and meet in the embassy that they have asked Raël to build for them, and share their advanced scientific knowledge with humankind. Thus, one of the stated main goals of the Raëlian movement is to inform as many people as possible about this extraterrestrial race.

The controversy surrounding the origins of Raëlian beliefs centers on the writings of several authors in the late 1960s. Jean Sendy, a French writer, translator, and author of books on the esoteric and UFOs wrote several novels detailing the creation of Earth by extraterrestrials. One of the best known researchers in this field is Erich von Däniken, the 'father' of the Ancient Astronauts theory, which postulates that Earth might have been visited by extraterrestrials in the remote past.

With the publication of Chariots of the Gods? in 1968, Erich von Däniken introduced the intervention theory to the general public. Von Däniken wrote that the technologies and religions of ancient civilizations were granted by extraterrestrials worshiped as gods. Von Däniken argued that only extraterrestrial intervention can explain the higher technological knowledge presumed to be essential for the production of ancient artifacts such as the Egyptian pyramids, Stonehenge and the Moai of Easter Island. Humans in ancient times considered this extraterrestrial high-tech to be supernatural and the aliens themselves to be 'gods'. One can find direct parallels to the messages that Vorilhon claimed to have received and written about in his books. Marie-Hélène Parent, ex-guide Raëlian priest, describes Sendy and Vorilhon meeting several times for drinks and conversation throughout the years of 1973 and 1974, prior to Vorilhon's claimed extraterrestrial encounter.

==== Humankind's chance of creating life on other planets ====
Raëlians believe that humankind would be able to create life on other planets only if it is peaceful enough to stop war. If done, humans could travel the distances between stars and create life on another planet. Progress in terraformation, molecular biology, and cloning would enable these teams to create continents and life from scratch. Progress in social engineering would ensure that this creation would have a better chance of both surviving as well as having the potential to understand its creators. Research on how globalization would occur on another planet would allow scientists to decide what traces of their origin should be left behind so that their role in life creation would someday be revealed. The progress achieved by the science teams would ultimately sustain a perpetual chain of life.

=== A coming judgement ===
Raëlians do not believe in reincarnation as dictated by mystical writings because they do not believe that an ethereal soul exists free of physical confinement. Instead the Raëlians think that advanced supercomputers of the Elohim are right now recording the memories and DNA of human beings. When Elohim release this information for the coming resurrection, people would be brought back from the dead and the judgments upon them would be realized based on actions in their past life. People excluded from physical recreation would include those who achieved nothing positive but were not evil. Vorilhon expressed an interest in cloning Hitler for war trials and retroactive punishment. Raël also mentioned cloning as the solution to terrorism by suicide attacks, as the perpetrators would not be able to escape punishment by killing themselves if the Elohim recreated them after their attacks.

== Practices ==
=== Initiation of new members ===
The major initiation rite in the Raëlian Church is the "baptism" or "transmission of the cellular plan". That rite is enacted by upper-level members of the Raëlian clergy who are called "guides". Canadian sociologist Susan J. Palmer says that in 1979, Raël introduced the "Act of Apostasy" as an obligation for people who are preparing for their Raëlian baptism. CTV Television Network states that apostasy from other religions is required for new Raëlian members. Joining the Raëlian Church through transmission of the cellular plan happens only on certain days of the year. There are four such days, all of which mark anniversaries in the Raëlian calendar.

The Raëlian baptism is known as "transmission of the cellular plan", where "cellular" refers to the organic cells of the body, and the "plan" refers to the genetic makeup of the individual. That Raëlian baptism involves a guide member laying water onto the forehead of the new member. That practice began on "the first Sunday in April" of 1976, when Raël baptized 40 Raëlians. Raëlians believe that their genetic information is recorded by a remote computer, and would become recognized during their final hour, when they will be judged by the extraterrestrial Elohim.

There is continuing debate on whether Raëlians can be identified as a cult. The government of France classifies the Raëlian Movement as a "secte" (French word for cult). However, according to Glenn McGee, the associate director of the Center for Bioethics at the University of Virginia, part of the sect is a cult, while the other part is a commercial website that collects large sums of money from people who are interested in human cloning. The Bureau of Democracy, Human Rights, and Labor of the United States Department of State, and sociologist Susan J. Palmer, have classified the International Raëlian Movement as a religion.

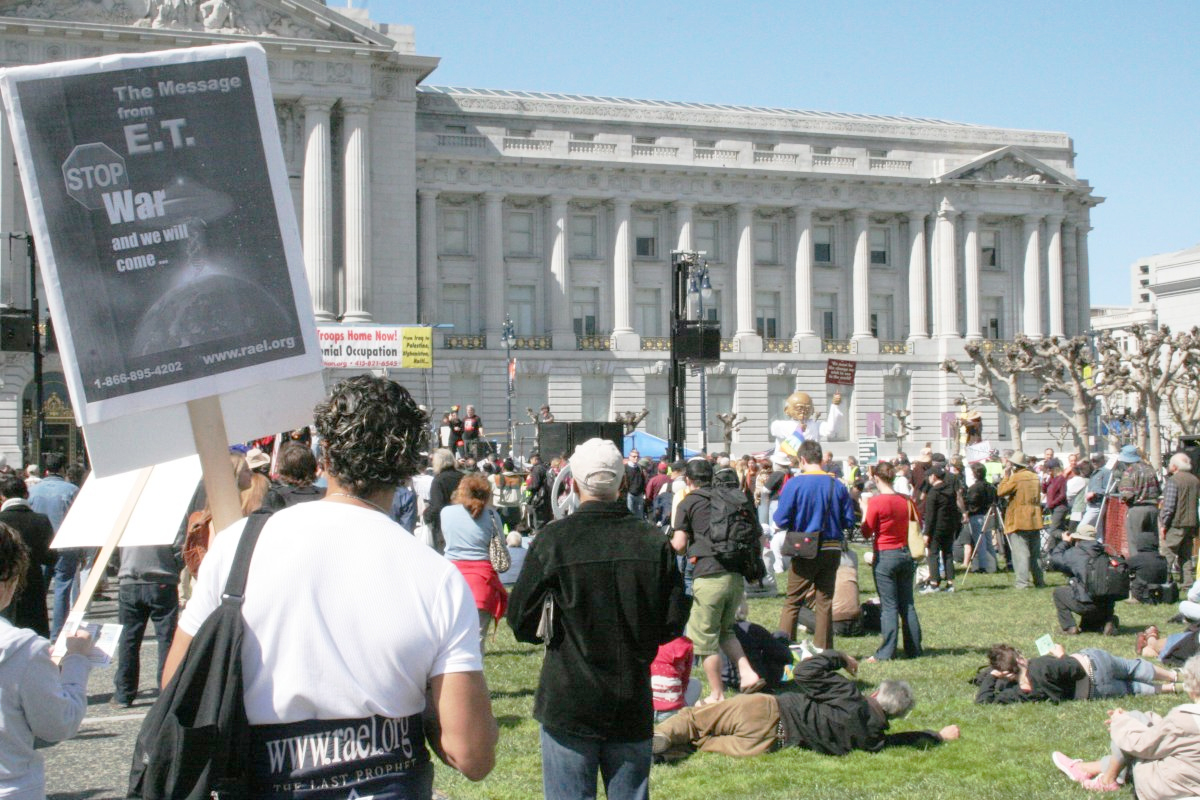
A Raëlian protest sign is raised at a political rally, demanding the return of U.S. troops.

=== Activism ===
Raëlians routinely advocate sex-positive feminism and genetically modified food and actively protest against wars in addition to the Catholic Church. For example, a photographer of the Associated Press snapped a picture of half-naked Raëlian women wearing pasties as part of an anti-war demonstration in Seoul, Korea. A snapshot by Agence France-Presse revealed Raëlians in white alien costumes with signs bearing the message "NO WAR ... ET wants Peace, too!". On 6 August 2003, the first day of Raëlian year 58 AH, a tech article on the USA Today newspaper mentions an "unlikely ally" of the Monsanto Company, the Raëlian Movement of Brazil. The movement gave vocal support in response to the company's support for genetically modified organisms particularly in their country. Brazilian farmers have been using Monsanto's genetically engineered soy plant as well as the glyphosate herbicide to which it was artificially adapted. The Raëlians spoke against the Brazilian government's ban on GMOs.

In July 2001, Raëlians on the streets attracted Italians and Swiss people as they gave leaflets in protest to over a hundred child molesters in existence among Roman Catholic clergy in France. They recommended that parents should not send their children to Catholic confession. The Episcopal vicar of Geneva sued the Raëlian Church for libel but did not win. The judge did not accept the charges for the reason that the Raëlians were not attacking the whole of the Catholic Church.

In October 2002, Raëlians in a Canadian anti-clerical parade held handed out Christian crosses to high school students. They were invited to burn the crosses in a park not far from Montreal's Mount Royal and to sign letters of apostasy from the Roman Catholic Church. The Quebec Association of Bishops called this "incitement to hatred", and several school boards attempted to prevent their students from meeting Raëlians.

==== Topless Rights of Women ====
Several Raëlian groups in the United States have organized annual protests, based upon their claim that women should have the same legal right to go topless in public, which men can do without fear of arrest for indecent exposure. Some people have called that a publicity stunt that serves to recruit new members. "Go Topless Day" is their annual event, in which women protest while topless, except for nipple pasties to avoid arrest. That event is held near August 26th, which is the anniversary of the day that women were given the right to vote in the US.

== Advocacy ==
=== Embassy for Extraterrestrials ===
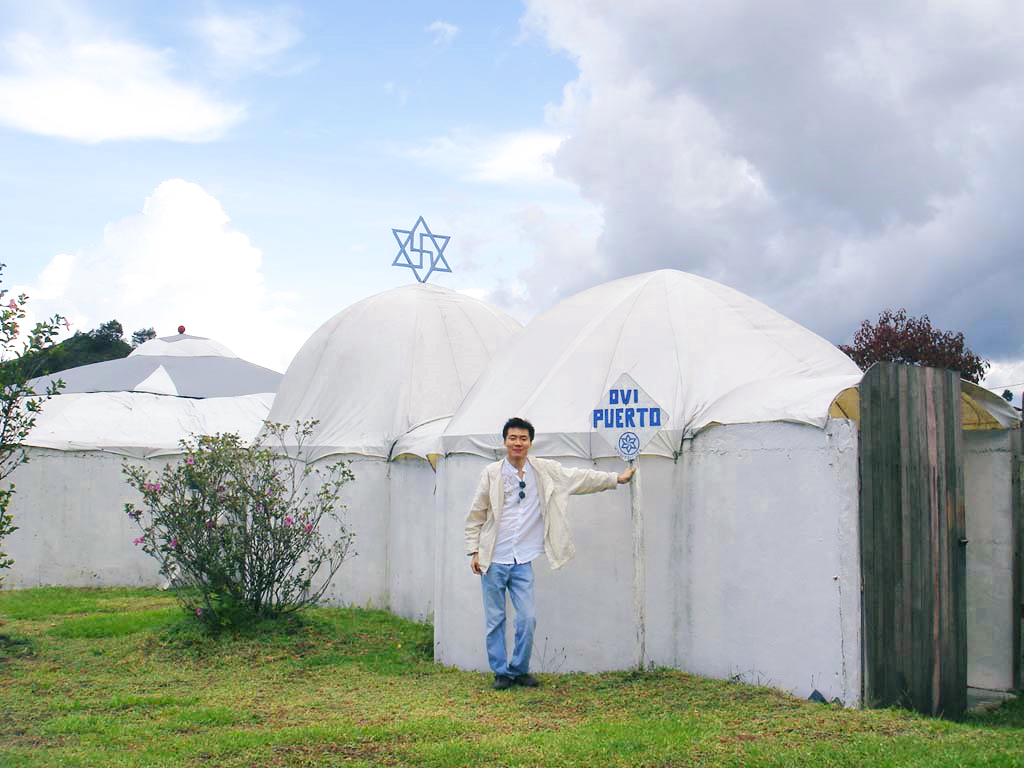
Tent mockup of the Raëlian Embassy for Extraterrestrials

Raëlians believe that life on earth—as well as many religions of the world—was the work of extraterrestrial influence. They believe these were scientists and that ancient people saw them as "gods" and gave the name "Elohim". Raëlians believe that the Embassy for Extraterrestrials or "Third Temple" is to support an official contact with Extraterrestrial Elohim and their messengers of the main religions at the "New Jerusalem". Writers who have influenced Raëlian beliefs include Zechariah Sitchin and Erich von Däniken.

The International Raëlian Movement envisions having an entrance with an aseptic chamber leading to a conference room for twenty-one people as well as a dining room of the same capacity. In the plan are seven rooms for the purpose of receiving human guests into the embassy. The embassy building, along with the swimming pool, would be in the center of a large park and protected from trespassing by a wall—a maximum of two stories—to surround the entire complex's circumference. Trees and bushes are to be planted in the outskirts of the wall's area. The walls are to have a northern and southern entrance. The landing pad for the embassy should be able to fit a spaceship of twelve meters of diameter or 39'4" on its terrace. The terrace is to be above the rooms in the torus, which are for extraterrestrials only. The seven rooms directly underneath the landing pad would be protected from occupants of other rooms with a thick metal door. Finally, the International Raëlian Movement wants to avoid military and radar surveillance of the airspace above the embassy. Buildings for administration, food and water provisions, and state-of-the-art sanitation and communication systems are part of this vision. A nearby replica of the Raëlian Embassy for Extraterrestrials open to the public is expected to show visitors what it is like inside the real one.

In February 1991, the Raëlian Church modified their symbol to remove the swastika to help in negotiations with building the "Third Temple of Israel". The official reason given was a telepathic request from extraterrestrials called Elohim to change the symbol in order to help in negotiations with Israel for the building of a Raëlian "embassy" or "third temple of Israel" to greet the anticipated coming of extraterrestrials and founders of past religions, although the country still denies their request.

On 13 December 1997, the leader of the International Raëlian Movement had decided to extend the possibility of building the embassy outside of Jerusalem and also allow that a significant portion of the embassy property be covered with water. The area of the proposed embassy property is still envisioned at a minimum of 3.47 square kilometres (1.34 sq mi), with a radius of at least 1.05 kilometres (0.65 mi).

In 2005, the Israeli Raëlian Guide Kobi Drori stated that the Lebanese government was discussing proposals by the Raëlian movement to build their "interplanetary embassy" in Lebanon. However, one condition was that the Raëlians did not display their logo on top of the building because it mixes a swastika and a Star of David. According to Drori, the Raëlians involved declined this offer, as they wished to keep the symbol as is.

=== Ideas of how government and the economy should run ===
==== Geniocracy ====
Geniocracy is a system of government that was proposed by Raël in his 1977 book Geniocracy, in which only those possessing sufficient intellect are enfranchised and only people meeting an even higher barrier are allowed to hold office. The thresholds proposed by the Raëlians are 10% above average for voting and 50% above average for candidates. This system was proposed by Raël to counter a flaw he saw in liberal democracy where the state becomes captured by appealing to popular consensus through emotive issues rather than being able to make critical decisions for the long term good of everyone.

The Raëlian view of geniocracy also includes forming a peaceful world government that favors intelligence over mediocrity because current governments are inadequate for dealing with contemporary global issues. Raëlians believe that a world government is only possible through establishing a global currency, a common language, and a transformation of militaries of the world into civil police. Raël also recommends that under this world government, Earth should be divided into 12 regions and people would vote for which region they want to be part of. After the regions are defined, they are further divided into 12 sectors of equal population.

Info-Cult, an anti-cult organization, has called Geniocracy a fascist ideology. Because of the controversies surrounding geniocracy, Raël presents the idea as a classic utopia or provocative ideal, and not necessarily a model that all of humankind will follow.

==== Humanitarianism ====
In Raël's book, Extraterrestrials took me to their Planet, Raël claims that an extraterrestrial gave him the idea of Humanitarianism. Under the establishment of Humanitarianism, people would not have ownership of businesses or exploitable goods created by others. Instead, people would rent each of them for a period of 49 years. The founders would be able to receive the rents for up to 49 years or when they die, whichever is later. Any rents not inherited by relatives after 49 years would go to the State. By balancing inheritances, children would be born with enough financial means to forsake menial tasks for endeavors that may benefit the whole of humankind. Family houses could be inherited from generation to generation, free of rent.

In his much later book, Maitreya, Raël says that the road to a world without money is capitalism and globalization, as opposed to communism. Capitalism would allow people who contribute much to society to also contribute to its scientific and technological development. Under capitalism, society would produce as much money as it can. The money would become important in the short run, as nanotechnology quickly lowers the cost of goods while putting many people out of work.

=== Liberal sensuality ===
According to Vorilhon's book Sensual Meditation, one should develop the ability to break free of habitual thoughts that prevent one from appreciating everyday phenomena. The book describes in detail six different meditations involving making full use of the lungs' capacity to expand and contract, oxygenating the blood and the cells within, imagining heat travelling upwards from toe to the head, allowing the skin to feel under itself, and experiencing touch with another person's body and examining their figure.

According to the book Maitreya by Vorilhon, love involves experiencing different varieties and possibilities that allow one to break habits in order to make life more pleasant and interesting and that it is the only thing that can stop war and injustice that persists in today's world. Raëlians believe in the right to form new religions or new political parties as long as they do not promote violence. As individualists, Raëlians believe that the one who gives the order to harm others is less at fault than the one who executes it.

Raëlians say they encourage adult homosexual, bisexual, and heterosexual relationships and that society should recognize them legally. However, government authorities such as those in Switzerland fear that Raëlians are a threat to public morals for supporting liberalized sex education for children. The authorities believe that such liberalized sex education teaches youth how to obtain sexual gratification which would encourage sexual abuse of underage children. The Raëlians disagree with those fears and stated that sex education done properly would involve educating parents as well as children.

Susan J. Palmer writes that in 1991, a French journalist went to a Raëlian Seminar and taped couples having sexual intercourse in tents. These tapes gained widespread publicity—with news stories describing these practices as perverted and a form of brainwashing.

Since 1991, Raël's teachings on sexual intercourse have caused controversy among other religious groups. The next year, Catholic schools in Montreal, Canada objected to a proposed condom vending machine as contrary to their mission. In response, Raëlian guides gave the Catholic students ten thousand condoms. The Commissioner of Catholic schools for Montreal said they could do nothing to stop them. Around this time, Raëlians dubbed the event "Operation Condom".

=== Cloning of humans ===
In the scientific community, reproductive cloning refers only to the creation of a genetically identical living thing. "Genetically identical" does not mean altogether identical; this kind of cloning does not reproduce a living thing's memories or experiences, for example. However, in discussions of Raëlianism, cloning sometimes seems to refer not only to reproductive cloning, but also reproductive human cloning plus mind and/or brain transfer, or to a process of making adult clones. Raëlians take this even further by saying that humans can attain eternal life through the science of cloning.

According to the book Yes to Human Cloning, the first stage of this extended cloning process is creating a human embryo through human cloning. Raëlian bishop and Clonaid CEO Brigitte Boisselier claimed that an American woman underwent a cloning procedure of this type that led to the birth of a girl named Eve on 26 December 2002. Vorilhon told lawmakers that banning the development of human cloning was comparable to outlawing medical advances such as "antibiotics, blood transfusions, and vaccines."

The second stage of cloning, according to Raëlians, is causing the clone to mature faster than normal. Raël says that in the future, scientists will discover an "accelerated-growth process" in which a process like guided self-assembly of rapidly expanded cells or even nanotechnological assembly of a whole human body can form in a very short time.

The third stage is the transfer of memory and personality from the original person to the mature clone. For the process to maintain one branch for personality and memory, as opposed to two, a recording of the individual's mind would be required before the time of death, and would be transferred to an adult clone body after the original has died.

In the final stages of development, hitherto unknown information contained within undamaged DNA would be enough to bring others back from the dead including their memories and personality. This would be done by taking a small sample from someone's body and preserving it at the time when the level of the brain's efficiency and knowledge is highest. On the day of death, a cell would be taken from the sample for the cloning to take place, and the memories and personality would be restored to their peak level.

The Raëlian Church has close links with the controversial company Clonaid. Brigitte Boisselier, a Raëlian and chief executive of Clonaid, made a controversial and unverified claim that a human baby was conceived through cloning technology. Around this time, Clonaid's subsidiary BioFusion Tech claimed to have in possession a cell fusion device that assisted the cloning of human embryos. The Vatican, however, says that experimenters expressed "brutal mentality" for attempting to clone human beings. Pope John Paul II criticized the experiment which he believed threatened the dignity of human life. In response, the leader of the Raëlian Church dismissed the Pope's ethical concerns, calling them an "accumulation of religious prejudices."

== See also ==
- Geniocracy
- History of Raëlism
- Raëlism
- Biogenesis
- Exotheology
- Directed Panspermia
- Brigitte Boisselier – French CEO of Clonaid
- Claude Vorilhon/Raël – French singer, guitarist, and former automobile journalist
- Glenn Carter – British singer, actor
- Nayah – French singer
