= Intelligent design (disambiguation) =

Intelligent design is the belief that nature shows evidence of being caused by an intelligent creator, not an undirected process such as natural selection.

Intelligent design may also refer to:

== Books ==
- Intelligent Design (book), a 1999 work by William A. Dembski
- Intelligent Design: Message from the Designers, a religious text in Raëlism

== Music ==
- Intelligent Design (album), an album by Cesium 137
- The Intelligent Design Of..., an album by Joan of Arc
- "Intelligent Design", a song by Kilo Kish from American Gurl (2022)

== Television ==
- "Intelligent Design" (Lewis), a 2013 episode

== See also ==
- The Theory of Intelligent Design, a 2006 album by Fish Karma
- Intelligent designer, an entity posited by believers in intelligent design
