= Wang Shaoguang =

Chinese political scientist

Professor Wang Shaoguang
- 王绍光
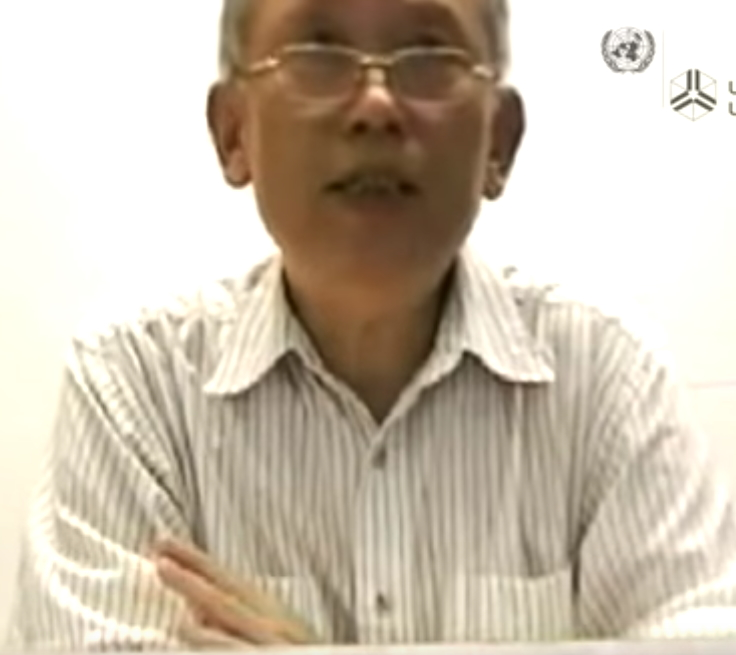
- Wang Shaoguang in a 2013 UN University interview
- Born: 31 January 1954 (age 72); Wuhan, Hubei, China

Academic background
- Education: Peking University (LL.B., 1982); Cornell University (Ph.D., 1990)
- Thesis: Failure of Charisma: The Cultural Revolution in Wuhan
- Influences: Carl Schmitt

Academic work
- Discipline: Political science
- School or tradition: Chinese New Left
- Institutions: Yale University (1990–2000); Chinese University of Hong Kong (1999–present)

Wang Shaoguang (born 31 January 1954; Chinese: 王绍光; pinyin: Wáng Shàoguāng) is a Chinese political scientist. He is currently an emeritus professor at the Department of Government and Public Administration of the Chinese University of Hong Kong. A critic of Western representative democracy, his particular research interests include the history of the Cultural Revolution, sortition, the welfare state, and the comparative politics of East Asia. He advocates for the China model.

== Life ==
Born in Wuhan, Hubei, Wang worked as a high school teacher in Wuhan from 1972 to 1977. He then studied at Peking University, graduating in 1982, and moved to Cornell University in the U.S., where he received a doctorate in 1990. He taught at Yale University from 1990 to 2000 before moving to the Chinese University of Hong Kong, where he became a professor at the Department of Government and Public Administration.

== Views ==
Wang is a leading member of the Chinese New Left.

In 1993, Wang co-authored the "Wang Shaoguang Proposal" with economist Hu Angang, a public policy report that argued that the taxation reforms of Deng Xiaoping had weakened the Chinese state, and advocated fiscal centralisation in response.

Wang is a critic of Western representative democracy, which he believes has failed and degenerated into "electocracy". Wang contends that in the electoral model of democracy, there is no guarantee that elected elites act in the interests of voters and therefore elections primarily act as the people's formal "granting of power to the elites." Wang argues that the view of democracy as primarily electoral democracy only became accepted in the postwar period, owing mainly to the work of Joseph Schumpeter and his book Capitalism, Socialism and Democracy. Instead, he states, the "people should be involved in the whole process of decision-making, not only in choosing the decision-maker per se". In Wang's view, the mass line is critical to effective democracy.

He also distinguishes accountability from responsibility and political responsiveness, holding that genuine democracy must combine all three: "democratic" governments are often accountable in that they may be removed in competitive elections, Wang posits, but they are still not responsive to popular needs and demands. Wang describes representative democracy with the metaphor of "bird-cage democracy," denoting a structure that while seemingly attractive is in fact confining.

In 2008, Wang published Four Lectures on Democracy, based on lectures he had delivered at Tsinghua University the previous year. In the text, Wang writes that notable thinkers in Western history (citing Plato, Aristotle, Thucydides, and Cicero) considered democracy to be a bad idea. Wang also contends that the modern examples of Western democracy excluded certain groups from participating in democratic institutions for a long time (citing the examples of the United States, France, and the United Kingdom). Wang's view is that representative democracy amounts to choosing one's master and does not necessarily improve the lives of most people in the country. He contends that democracy has many meanings, but the most important is "a government's responsiveness to the people, meaning government policies reflect popular needs, demands, [and] preferences to a high degree; this kind of democracy is the closest to the true meaning of democracy."

== Works ==
- Failure of Charisma: The Cultural Revolution in Wuhan. Oxford and New York: Oxford University Press. 1995. ISBN 0195859502.
- The Political Economy of Uneven Development: The Case of China. Armonk: M. E. Sharpe, Inc. 1999. ISBN 9780765602039, with Hu Angang.
- The Chinese Economy in Crisis: State Capacity and Tax Reform. Armonk: M. E. Sharpe, Inc. 2001. ISBN 9780765607652, with Hu Angang.
