= Hu Angang =

Economics professor at Tsinghua University

- 胡鞍钢
- Born: 27 April 1953 (age 73)
- Education: Tangshan Institute of Mining and Metallurgy; Chinese Academy of Sciences
- Organization(s): School of Public Policy and Management, Tsinghua University
- Movement: Chinese nationalism, Chinese New Left

Hu Angang (simplified Chinese: 胡鞍钢; traditional Chinese: 胡鞍鋼; pinyin: Hú Āngāng) is an economics professor at Tsinghua University. He is a proponent of China's state-owned enterprises and is sometimes described as part of China's New Left.

== Biography ==
Hu Angang was born on 27 April 1953. He is named for the state-owned enterprise Anshan Iron & Steel (Angang), where his father was an engineer.

He is a professor in the School of Public Policy & Management at Tsinghua University as well as Director of the Center for China Study at Tsinghua-CAS (Chinese Academy of Sciences).

Hu received his master's degree at Beijing University of Science and Technology in 1984. He received his PhD in Engineering at the Chinese Academy of Sciences in 1988.

== Political and economic positions ==
Hu position is that the Chinese socialist system is superior to other systems. In a July 2011 article for the People's Forum, Hu wrote that: "The CPC has always adhered to the mass line, rooting itself among the people in order to make democratic decisions. This is manifested in the superiority of the socialist policy-making system with Chinese characteristics. This policy-making system is based on the mass line of the Party, that is from the masses, to the masses and putting into practice what has been learned from practice."

Hu is also a proponent of China's state-owned enterprises (SOEs) writing that they are the backbone of national growth in China. Hu's view is that SOEs are the most important Chinese representatives in global market competition and that they "genuinely embody the national, political and organizational advantages of socialism. This is their main difference from capitalist enterprises." In an op-ed for the People's Daily Hu wrote: "The Western corporate culture emphasizes individualism, while the State-owned enterprise culture focuses more on harmony and collectivism. A good business model not only creates material wealth, but also creates spiritual wealth. Chinese corporate culture reflects this spiritual wealth, which in turn is a form of internal and external soft power. China, being a huge economy, needs large, internationally competitive State-owned enterprises. This is the only way that China can ensure that its enterprises enjoy a strong position amid fierce international competition." His advocacy of China's SOEs has led HU to be described as part of the Chinese New Left. This puts him at odds with Chinese former Premier Li Keqiang who favors reducing State intervention in the economy and has said that the Government should reduce its role in the economy even if doing so feels "like cutting one's wrist."

In 2012 Hu co-wrote a paper calling for the forcible assimilation of ethnic Uighurs in Xinjiang in an effort to create a standardized Chinese "state-race." Although this hard line policy was initially criticized within China it later gained popularity as a policy proposal.

Hu is known in China for his strong support of socialism and the Chinese Communist Party. In July 2013 he wrote an op-ed for People's Daily stating: "Compared with the civil society in the West, the people's society is superior... it is a great made-in-China innovation in theory and practice." He went on to say that "[t]he people's society is a socialist society under the leadership of the Communist Party." This drew strong criticism within China from social media sites and Chinese academics such as Yu Jianrong.

In August 2018 he was criticised in an open letter written by Tsinghua University alumni calling for the university to fire Hu. The letter accused him of using "self-serving criteria" in his research so as to exaggerate claims of China's greatness. The letter states that Hu espoused an exaggerated sense of national superiority and overt nationalism that, according to the letter, harms China's foreign relations whilst also misleading the public.

== See also ==
- Maoism
- New Left
