= Raël =

French founder and leader of the Raëlian Movement

Personal life
- Born: Claude Maurice Marcel Vorilhon; 30 September 1946 (age 80) Vichy, France
- Notable ideas: Sensual meditation; Geniocracy; Raëlian cosmology; Message from the designers

Religious life
- Religion: Raëlism

Raël (Note: /reɪl/; French: [ʁa.ɛl]; also spelled Rael) (born Claude Maurice Marcel Vorilhon, (Note: French: [klod vɔ.ʁi.jɔ̃]) 30 September 1946) is a French journalist and religious leader who founded and leads the Raëlian Movement, an international UFO religion.

Before becoming a religious leader, Raël, then known as Claude Vorilhon, worked as a sports car journalist and test driver for his car-racing magazine, Autopop. He reported an extraterrestrial encounter in December 1973 and subsequently formed the Raëlian Movement and changed his name to Raël. He later published several books, which detail the encounter with a being called Yahweh in 1973. He traveled the world to promote his books for over 30 years.

== Early life ==
Vorilhon was born in Vichy, Allier, France. He was raised in Ambert in the home of his maternal grandmother, who was atheist. His unknown father was Jewish and his mother a "devout atheist". He attended a Catholic boarding school in Le Puy-en-Velay and caused a scandal by taking part in communion without being baptized. His parents withdrew him from the boarding school to put him in school in Ambert. He later advocated that Huguenot descendants receive reparations from the Church.

At age 15, Vorilhon ran away from boarding school and hitchhiked to Paris, where he spent three years playing music on the streets and in cafés and cabarets. He met with Lucien Morisse, the director of a national radio program (on Europe 1), who was scouting for young talent. Vorilhon signed a record contract and became a rising teen pop star on the radio. He took on a new identity, assuming the name Claude Celler, and released six singles, including a minor hit song, "Le miel et la cannelle" ("Honey and Cinnamon"). Vorilhon had a passion for the songs of Belgian singer Jacques Brel, and tried to imitate his singing style. He was saving up his money to buy a racing car, a dream he had since he was a young boy, but his prospects as a singer came to an abrupt end when Morisse killed himself in September 1970.

Vorilhon decided to work as a sports journalist to gain access to the world of car racing. He met Marie-Paul Cristini, a nurse. They moved to Clermont-Ferrand, where Vorilhon started his own publishing house. He created a sports car magazine, Autopop, whose first issue was released in May 1971. One of the tasks for his new startup was the position of testing new automobiles, which enabled him to enter the motor racing world.

== The Raëlian messages ==
On December 3, 1973 in a secluded area within a French volcanic crater, Vorilhon claimed to see a strong flashing light and saw "something like a bell" made of shiny metal coming out from the sky slowly without any noise. A trapdoor opened under the craft, and an extraterrestrial being came out of a craft. The being told him, in French, that he had come for the sole purpose of meeting with him. Raël said he was given a message by this alien and told that it was his mission to pass this message on to the people of Earth. According to Vorilhon, the face of the extraterrestrial was "full of love."

The book states that advanced human scientists from another planet with 25,000 years of scientific advances created all life on Earth through DNA manipulation. These scientists, Raël said, were originally called Elohim or "those who came from the sky". He wrote that around 40 prophets in Earth's history were sent by Elohim, but their messages were distorted by humans, largely because of the difference in the level of civilization between the advanced race and Earth's primitive one.

Raël said that he was given the mission to inform the world of the origin of the human species, in anticipation of these extraterrestrials' return by building a residential embassy in neutral territory. He stated that certain mysteries were explained to him based on new interpretations of sacred texts such as the Bible. He claimed that, on 7 October 1975, he was contacted by one of the Elohim, who took him to another planet to meet Buddha, Moses, Jesus and Muhammad. He stated that his second book, Les extra-terrestres m'ont emmené sur leur planète (Extraterrestrials Took Me To Their Planet), relates the teaching he received from these people. In this book, Raël describes beings free of money, sickness, and war.

In 1974, Raël decided to give up his automobile magazine, Autopop. That September, the last issue, number 34, was published. Raël then devoted himself to the task he said was given by his "biological father", an extraterrestrial named Yahweh. Shortly after a first public conference, Raël founded MADECH, a group of people interested in helping him in his task, which later became the International Raëlian Movement.

== Marriages ==
Raël has been married three times.

His first wife was Marie-Paul Cristini. Sociologist Susan J. Palmer said that Cristini, a nurse, diagnosed Raël as clinically depressed after he appeared at her doorstep in 1987, burnt out from the tasks he carried out within the movement.

Raël focused on spreading his message in Japan in the 1980s, and by 1987, he met Lisa Sunagawa. Sunagawa soon began accompanying Raël during his travels to Lima, Miami, Brazil, and Martinique. In the 1990 Radio Canada television documentary They're Coming!, Raël is seen with four women, while Lisa, in slow motion, wears a pink tutu and holds hands with him.

Raël separated from Sunagawa sometime between 1990 and 1992. Around that time, Sophie de Niverville, whose mother and aunt were both Raëlians, was convinced of the authenticity of the messages. Sophie received a Raëlian baptism at age 15. When she turned 16, she married Raël at Montreal's city hall. During a December 2001 interview with Palmer, Sophie spoke positively about Raël, despite their divorce the previous year; they continued to live together.

== Racing career ==
In 1994, wealthy Japanese Raëlians rented a race car and showed it to Raël. They believed that if he raced it, it would generate publicity for the movement. Raël accepted the offer on the condition that the funding not come from member tithes or embassy funding. Funding for Raël's races, which took place in the 1990s and early 2000s, came mostly from well-funded European and Japanese people. His best finishes included "a 3rd place finish in GT1 in Lime Rock with the Mosler Raptor in 1997, and a 7th place finish at Watkins Glen with a Viper GTS R in a 1999 FIA GT race". Raël participated in the 1999 BFGoodrich Tires Trans-Am Series and the 2000 Speedvision GT Championship. According to Palmer, Raël announced in November 2001 that he intended to retire from professional auto racing. He said that he still enjoyed racing in the form of video games.

1999 BFGoodrich Tires Trans-Am Series
Round	Date	Car	Start	Finish	Laps	Track	Source
Two	23 May 1999	Chevrolet	21st	19th	35 out of 40	Mosport International Raceway	Motorsport.com

2000 Speedvision GT Championship events
Round	Date	Car	Start	Finish	Laps	Track	Source
One	1 April 2000	Lotus Esprit	29th	32nd	15 out of 29	Lowe's Motor Speedway	Motorsport.com
Two	21 May 2000	Lotus Esprit	31st	18th	27 out of 27	Mosport International Raceway	Motorsport.com
Three	27 May 2000	Lotus Esprit	38th			Lime Rock Park	Motorsport.com
Eight	15 October 2000	Porsche 911 GT3	32nd	25th	25 out of 26	Laguna Seca Raceway	Motorsport.com
Nine	29 October 2000	Porsche 911 GT3	25th	25th	29 out of 30	Las Vegas Motor Speedway	Motorsport.com

== Promoted technologies ==
Raël believes that humans are slowly transitioning into a society wherein they will not need to work or have jobs. This is due to human technological advancement and because humans "are not made to work". He has stated that work is for machines, whereas humans are made to create, think, and enrich themselves.

Much of Raël's advocacy concerning futuristic technology is described in his 2001 book, Yes to Human Cloning. He supported human genetic engineering in order to avoid genetically inherited diseases and to reduce the economic burden on society. He said that no distinctive emphasis needed to be allocated to a particular race or religion. Elsewhere in the book, he stated that nanotechnology will make it possible to have micro-distributive power generation (essentially a power plant in each house), fur-like furnishings that are self-cleaning with hair-like fibers that move on their own, and biological robots. Nanostructures control biology, so Raël expected that meat and salads will someday be grown in a machine via molecular construction.

Raël believed that genetically modified food is the only way to stop hunger everywhere in the world, and he saw a future where qualities of different foods can be combined through direct genetic modification. In Raël's book, Extraterrestrials took me to their planet (book number 2 in the volume Intelligent Design), he said that animation of plant life was possible through nanotechnology and that he was presented genetically modified flowers, that swayed and changed colors with music, while on another planet.

== Criticism and controversies ==
=== Plagiarism ===
In recent years, many ex-Raëlians have accused Vorilhon of plagiarism. They have compared numerous passages from his books with those of author Jean Sendy. Raëlian concepts such as chemical education, infinity, geniocracy, and others are all found in Sendy's books. Most of Raël's book Sensual Meditation is said to have been derived from the Silva 'Mind Control' Method, which was allegedly taught to him by ex-level-5 guide of the Canadian Raelian Movement, Jean-Denis Saint-Cyr.

In her book Raël, Thief of Souls: Biography of a Liar (French: Raël, Voleur d'âmes : Biographie d'un menteur), Maryse Péloquin provides the result of her ten years of research into Vorilhon and his movement, with evidence to support the conclusion that Raël has copied concepts from, and often paraphrased full paragraphs from, other UFO and ancient astronaut authors of the 1950s, 1960s, and early 1970s, such as Sendy, Brinsley Trench, and Robert Charroux. In her book, the dialogue of Raël's "encounter with an ET" is shown to closely resemble that of "contactee" George Adamski, who claimed that he had an encounter on 13 December 1952.

Much of the Raëlian philosophy also closely matches that of Osho. The white costume Raël wears closely resembles one that Osho was known to have worn.

=== Appearances in the media ===
In 1992, Raël appeared on Ciel mon Mardi, a French talk show hosted by journalist Christophe Dechavanne. Toward the end of the show, Raël's sexual liberalism was critiqued by a priest, a social worker, and a psychologist. A former Raëlian, Jean Parraga, believed that his wife and children were being held as prisoners, and that Raël attempted to break up his family. Parraga thought that his wife and children were being treated like criminals in activities such as orgies and sacrifices that involve children, at the Sensual Meditation camp. Parraga also had a criminal record as a drug dealer and car thief, and in August 1992, he attempted to shoot Raël.

Raëlians from around the world sent letters of protest to Dechevanne's TV station. Dechavanne portrayed that as "incitement to violence" and sued Raël. The judge appointed to the case decided to question Raël. Raël agreed to ask his members to stop sending letters if the station apologized publicly. The two parties agreed to drop the feud.

In 2004, Raël appeared on the first airing of the Quebec version of the French talk show Tout le monde en parle, hosted by Guy A. Lepage. During this appearance, Raël upset panel members with his statements on democracy and cloning. The situation reached its peak when caricaturist Serge Chapleau called Raël a "farce" and a "nerd", ridiculed his clothes, and grabbed him by the back of his neck. Raël left the stage, followed by his disciples. A fellow guest on the show, Parti Québécois Member of Quebec Legislative Assembly Pauline Marois, who later became premier of Quebec, called Raël "insane". The Raëlian Movement asked Marois to apologize; she refused.

A Swiss newspaper that called Raëlians "rat heads" was sued for defamation. Another suit was brought against journalist Stephane Baillargeon for writing in the Montreal daily Le Devoir that Raëlians defend pedophiles and that certain ex-Raëlians claim the "gourou" likes very young girls. After some negotiation, Le Devoir published a letter from Raël condemning the charge as "ignominious defamation" and asserting that the Raëlian Movement had "always condemned pedophilia and promoted respect for laws that justly forbid the practices that are always the fault of unbalanced individuals".

=== Appearances in court ===
In 1991, Raël sued French journalist Jean-Yves Cashga for defamation; Raël lost and was ordered to pay court costs. The judgment remains uncollected. Amid growing legal problems in France, Raël emigrated to Canada.

On two separate court dates of 2 September 1994 at the High Courts of Paris and 1 October 1996 at the Appeal Court of Paris, journalists Jacques Cotta and Pascal Martin of Flammarion Publishing were found guilty of attributing racist statements and distorted quotations to Raël in their book Dans le secret des sectes. They were fined 10,000FF in damages and 13,000FF in proceedings costs, ordered to insert stickers mentioning the sentence on copies not yet distributed and to suppress of the passage in the next editions, and told that they would be fined 100FF for each non-conforming copy.

On 26 January 1994, in emergency proceedings by the Appeal Court of Reims, Myriam Assan was accused of defamation for claiming in her book that "Raël was often sentenced for corruption of minors". Assan was given a provisional sentence of 10,000FF in damages and ordered to withdraw the book. She was sentenced to pay a penalty of 300FF per infringement and 5,000FF in proceedings costs and to publish the judgment in Le Monde and Le Figaro.

On 13 December 1994, Gérard Chol, director of Le Maine Libre, was declared guilty by the High Court of Le Mans for public defamation for claiming that the Raël's movement was laundering money coming from drug trafficking, prostitution, arms dealing, and the sale of pornographic videotapes. Chol was ordered to pay 1FF in damages and 3,000FF in proceedings costs and to publish the penal judgment in Le Maine Libre.

In 2003, Vorilhon sued Ottawa columnist Denis Gratton and Le Droit newspaper for $85,000 in defamation damages over a 23 January 2003 column; Raël lost and was ordered to pay court costs by Quebec Superior Court on 21 June 2006.

=== Government action against Raël ===
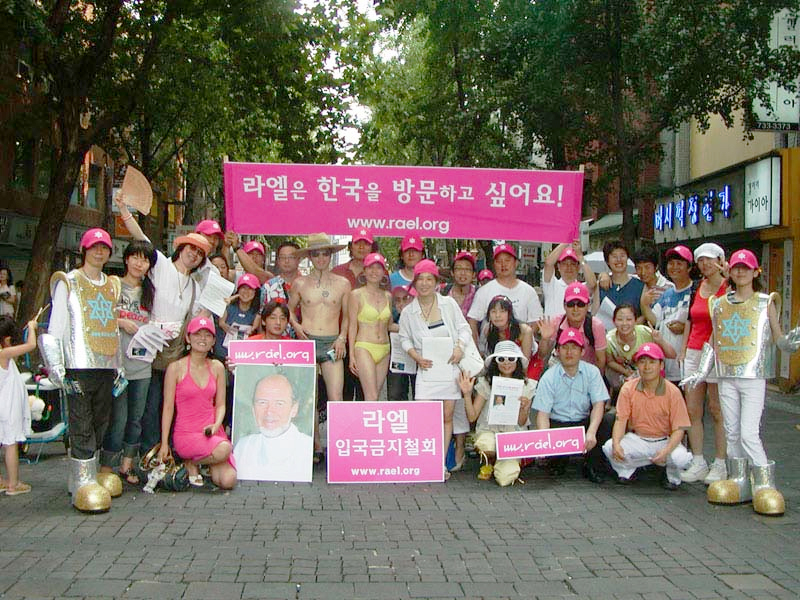
A public gathering of Raëlists in 2006 in the Insa-dong neighbourhood of Seoul, South Korea, protesting the banning of Claude Vorilhon from visiting South Korea by the South Korean government.

In response to Raël's association with Clonaid, South Korean immigration authorities at the airport denied him entry into their country in 2003. A planned Raëlian seminar continued, with Raël making some brief "big screen" video-camera appearances via the internet for the several hundred who attended. Raël instructed South Korean Raëlians to protest near the Ministry of Health and Welfare that ordered him to leave.

In February 2007, Raël, who wanted to start commercial activities with Swiss vintners, was denied residence in the Swiss Canton Valais, in part because he was feared to be endangering public values by promoting sexual liberty and the education of children on how to obtain sexual pleasure. Also cited was his association with the Clonaid human cloning claim; Switzerland forbade human cloning. In a brief statement, Raël said he considered appeal at the European level.

== Discography ==
- 1966: "Sacrée sale gueule"
- 1966: "Dans un verre de vin"
- 1967: "Le Miel et la cannelle" (Honey and cinnamon)
- 1967: "Madam' Pipi" (Mrs. Toilet attendant)
- 1967: "Monsieur votre femme me trompe" (Mister, your wife is cheating on me)
- 1967: "Quand on se mariera" (When we'll get married)

== Bibliography ==
- 1974: Le Livre qui dit la vérité ("The Book Which Tells the Truth")
- 1975: Les extra-terrestres m'ont emmené sur leur planète ("Extraterrestrials Took me to Their Planet")
  - (collected in English as "The Message Given to Me by Extra-Terrestrials") ISBN 4-900480-05-3
- 1978: La géniocratie ("Geniocracy")
- 1979: Accueillir les extra-terrestres ("Welcoming the Extraterrestrials") ISBN 4-900480-06-1
- 1980: La méditation sensuelle ("Sensual Meditation") ISBN 1-903571-07-3
- 1992: Le racisme religieux financé par le gouvernement socialiste
- 1995: Vive le Québec libre!
- 2001: Oui au clonage humain ("Yes to Human Cloning") ISBN 1-903571-05-7
- 2003: Le Maitraya ("The Maitraya")
- 2006: Intelligent Design: Message from the Designers [English compilation of the 1974, 1975 and 1979 books] ISBN 2-940252-20-3
