= Bankocracy =

Form of government where financial institutions rule society

Bankocracy (from the English word bank and Ancient Greek κράτος - kratos, "power, rule") or trapezocracy (from Greek τράπεζα - trapeza, "bank") is a polemic term referring to the excessive power or influence of banks on public policy-making. It can also refer to a form of government where financial institutions rule society.

== Usage ==
One of the first uses of the term was by British Member of Parliament William Fullarton (1754–1808), who in a parliamentary debate on April 10, 1797 characterized the monopoly of the Bank of England as being a more important issue to solve than the peace attempts to end the war against France:

It is Bankocracy that threatens the destruction of social order ... that turns and overturns all questions respecting war, negotiations, and peace.

United States Senator Robert J. Walker (1801–1869), a staunch opponent of the Bank of the United States, delivered a speech in the Senate on January 21, 1840, where he warned that the acceptance of paper money as legal tender would "overthrow the Constitution, subvert the liberties of the country, and the rights of the people, and establish the reign of a bankocracy, more sordid, ruinous, and despotic, than that of any monarch, however absolute."

Pierre-Joseph Proudhon used the term in his work Les Confessions d’un révolutionnaire (1849), in reference to the July Monarchy:

The principle of the July government, founded by and for the middle class, was therefore property, the capital. Under a monarchical form, the essence of that government was bankocracy.

Mikhail Bakunin, an anarchist like Pierre-Joseph Proudhon, used the term in his work Statism and Anarchy while talking about the reaction from the German State headed by Otto von Bismarck. He uses the russian term for Yid in the original script, a derogatory for the word "Jew", showing his historically noted anti-semitism.

This reaction is nothing other than the ultimate realization of the anti-popular idea of the modern state, the sole objective of which is to organize the most intensive exploitation of the people’s labor for the benefit of capital concentrated in a very small number of hands. It signifies the triumphant reign of the Yids, of a bankocracy under the powerful protection of a fiscal, bureaucratic, and police regime which relies mainly on military force and is therefore in essence despotic, but cloaks itself in the parliamentary game of pseudo-constitutionalism.

The term was also used by Karl Marx in his work Das Kapital, Kritik der politischen Ökonomie (1867). He theorizes the birth of national debt as the catalyst for the primitive accumulation of capital:

The public debt becomes one of the most powerful levers of primitive accumulation. ... [T]he national debt has given rise to joint-stock companies, to dealings in negotiable effects of all kinds, and to agiotage, in a word to stock-exchange gambling and the modern bankocracy.

In Marxian economics, the term cognates with finance capitalism in general.

Numerous political observers and journalists have used the term when describing or commenting on the 2008 financial crisis.

== See also ==
- Bank of Saint George, a financial institution of the Republic of Genoa
