= Electocracy =

Form of government

An electocracy is a political system where citizens are able to elect their government but cannot participate directly in governmental decision-making as the government does not share its power. Electocracy is seen as a premature form of democracy due to the shared similarities of citizens casting ballots, however electocracy is not considered a democracy, though many democracies have electocracy involvement. In contrast to democracy, where citizens are able to participate in the making of decisions that affect them, electocracy sees decision-making limited to an elected individual or group who may then govern in an arbitrary and unaccountable manner until the next election.

The United States government, for example, elects a president to govern the nation. This "winner-takes-all" election is an example of electocracy within a democracy as the president of the United States has the final say in governmental decisions on a national level. Where democracy separates itself in the United States government from electocracy is on the local level. Citizens of the United States have more power over their local governments via mayors, governors and so forth which are also elected. These elections are balloted over a smaller amount of the population, allowing for more "by the people, for the people" representation in the government. At this level of government, citizens are able to intervene on public issues and participate in the decision making that will affect them, hence forth making the differentiation between an electocratic form of government and a democratic form of government.

Iraq has been cited as an example of an electocracy, as has Thailand before the coup of 2006. Chinese political scientist Wang Shaoguang views Western democracy itself as electocracy. Many post-communistic countries have adopted versions of electocracy as their form of government, each varying in the amount of elections held annually. Some former British colonies such as Malaysia have been introduced to electocracy as a political system alternative to communism which became a threat to Malaysian government post World War II.

== See also ==
- Elective dictatorship
- Totalitarian democracy
