= Intelligent Design: Message from the Designers =

Raëlism book

- Author: Raël
- Publisher: Raelian foundation
- Publication date: 2006
- Pages: 422
- ISBN: 9782940252220

Intelligent Design: Message from the Designers is a book written by Claude Vorilhon (Raël), the founder of the Raëlian movement. The book was originally titled The Message Given to me by Extraterrestrials, but was republished in 2006 under the current name. In it, he explains his interaction with aliens (which he refers to as "Elohim"). In it, Rael argues for an alternative to the two most widely held explanations for the origin of life, creationism and evolution. He explains that the world and all life was created by a highly advanced group of aliens.

== See also ==
- Abiogenesis
