= Geniocracy =

Framework for a system of government ruled by intellectuals

Geniocracy is the framework for a system of government which was first proposed by Raël (leader of the International Raëlian Movement) in 1977 and which advocates a certain minimal criterion of intelligence for political candidates and also the electorate.

== Definition ==
The book cover of Raël's book Geniocracy: Government of the People, for the People, by the Geniuses (Printed for the first time in English: 2008 Nova Distribution.)

The term geniocracy comes from the word genius, and describes a system that is designed to select for intelligence and compassion as the primary factors for governance. While having a democratic electoral apparatus, it differs from traditional liberal democracy by instead suggesting that candidates for office and the body electorate should meet a certain minimal criterion of problem-solving or creative intelligence. The thresholds proposed by the Raëlians are 50% above the mean for an electoral candidate and 10% above the mean for an elector.

=== Justifying the method of selection ===
This method of selectivity is deliberate so as to address what the concept considers to be flaws in the current systems of democracy. The primary object of criticism is the inability of majoritarian consensus to provide a reasonable platform for intelligent decision-making for the purpose of solving problems permanently. Geniocracy's criticism of this system is that the institutions of democracy become more concerned with appealing to popular consensus through emotive issues than they are in making long-term critical decisions, especially those that may involve issues that are not immediately relevant to the electorate. It asserts that political mandate is something that is far too important to simply leave to popularity, and asserts that the critical decision-making that is required for government, especially in a world of globalization, cannot be based upon criteria of emotive or popular decision-making. In this respect, geniocracy derides liberal democracy as a form of "mediocracy". In a geniocracy, Earth would be ruled by a worldwide geniocratic government.

== Agenda ==
Part of the geniocratic agenda is to promote the idea of a world government system, deriding the current state-system as inadequate for dealing with contemporary global issues that are typical of globalisation, such as environmentalism, social justice, human rights, and the current economic system. In line with this, geniocracy proposes a different economic model (where it is given a name called Humanitarianism in the book Intelligent Design: Message from the Designers).

The lack of scientific rigour necessary for inclusion of geniocracy as properly testable political ideology can be noted in number of modern and historical dictatorships as well as oligarchies. Because of the controversies surrounding geniocracy, Raël presents the idea as a classic utopia or provocative ideal, and not necessarily a model that all of humankind will follow.

=== Democratically defined regions ===
The author of Geniocracy recommends (though does not necessitate) a world government with 12 regions. Inhabitants would vote for which region they want to be part of. After the regions are defined, they are further divided into 12 sectors after the same principle of democracy is applied. While sectors of the same region are defined as having equal numbers of inhabitants, the regions themselves may have different levels of population, which would be proportional to their voting power.

== See also ==
- Idiocracy (a dark comedy film) depicts the United States in 2505 where the vast majority are mentally backwards (by current standards) despite widespread use of IQ tests.
- Superman: Red Son ends with Lex Luthor establishing a utopian but elitist world government under the philosophy of "Luthorism" which is essentially a geniocracy run by Luthor and other geniuses.
- Plato's Republic
- Meritocracy
- Netocracy
- Transhumanism
- Technocracy
