= Brasília =

Federal capital of Brazil

- Federal capital
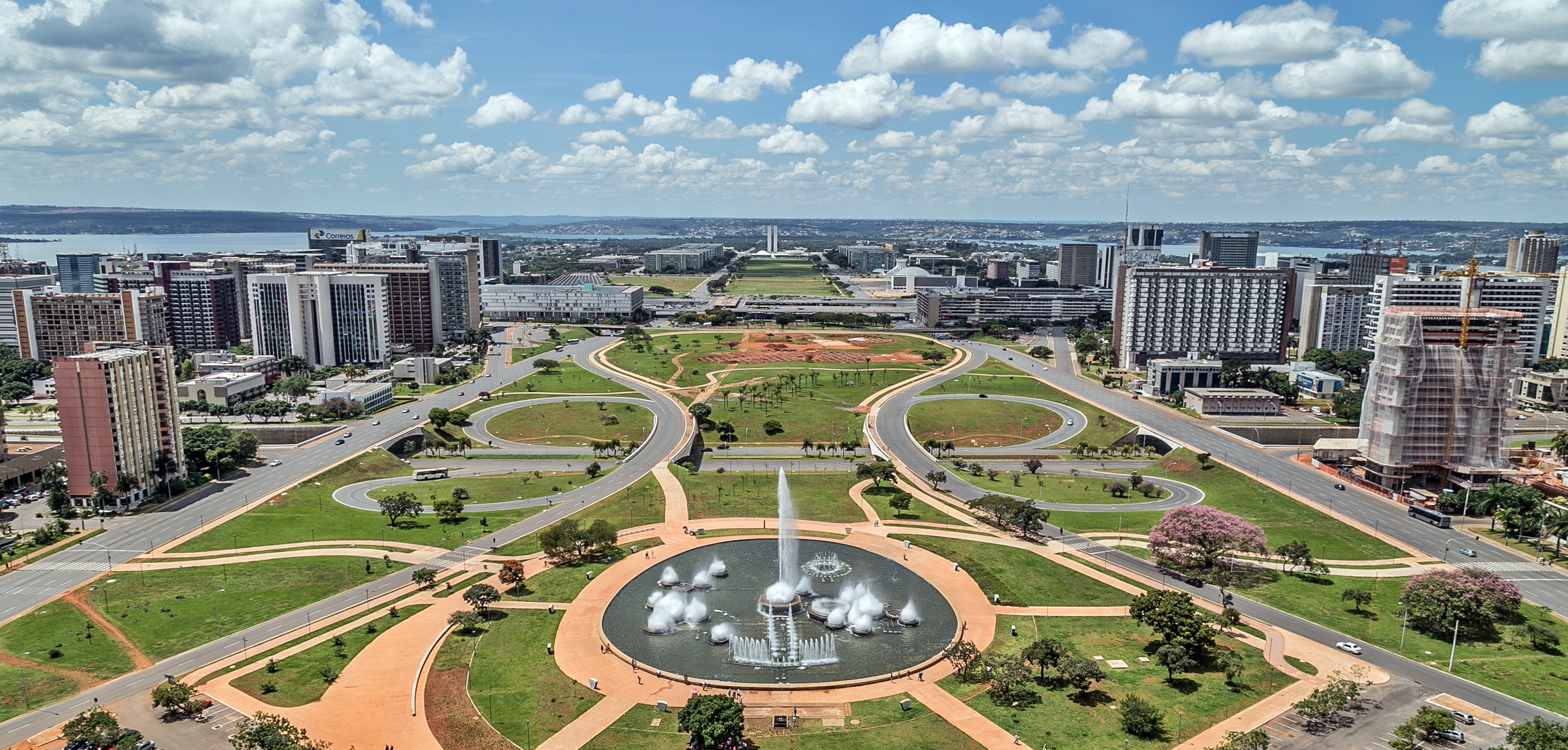
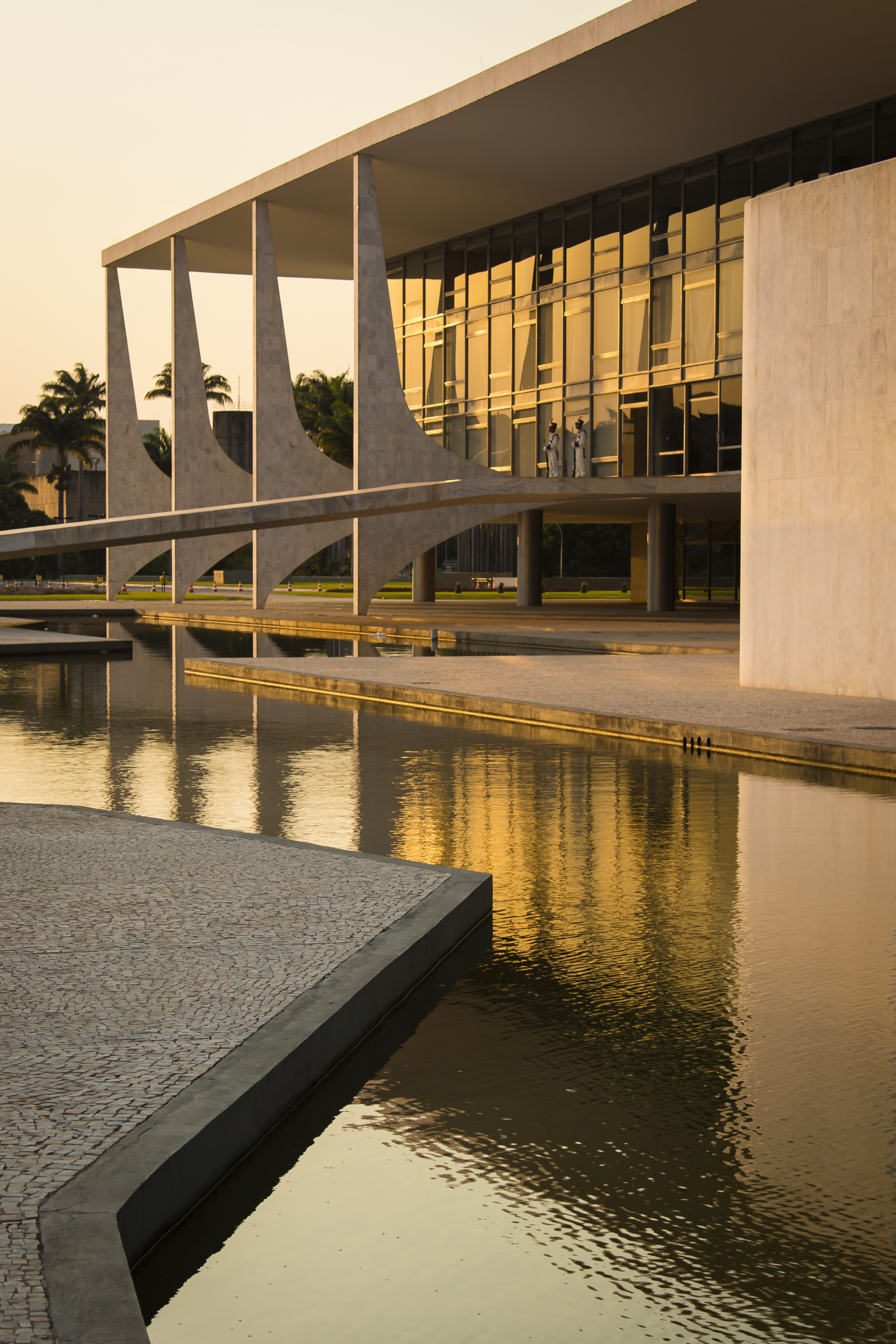
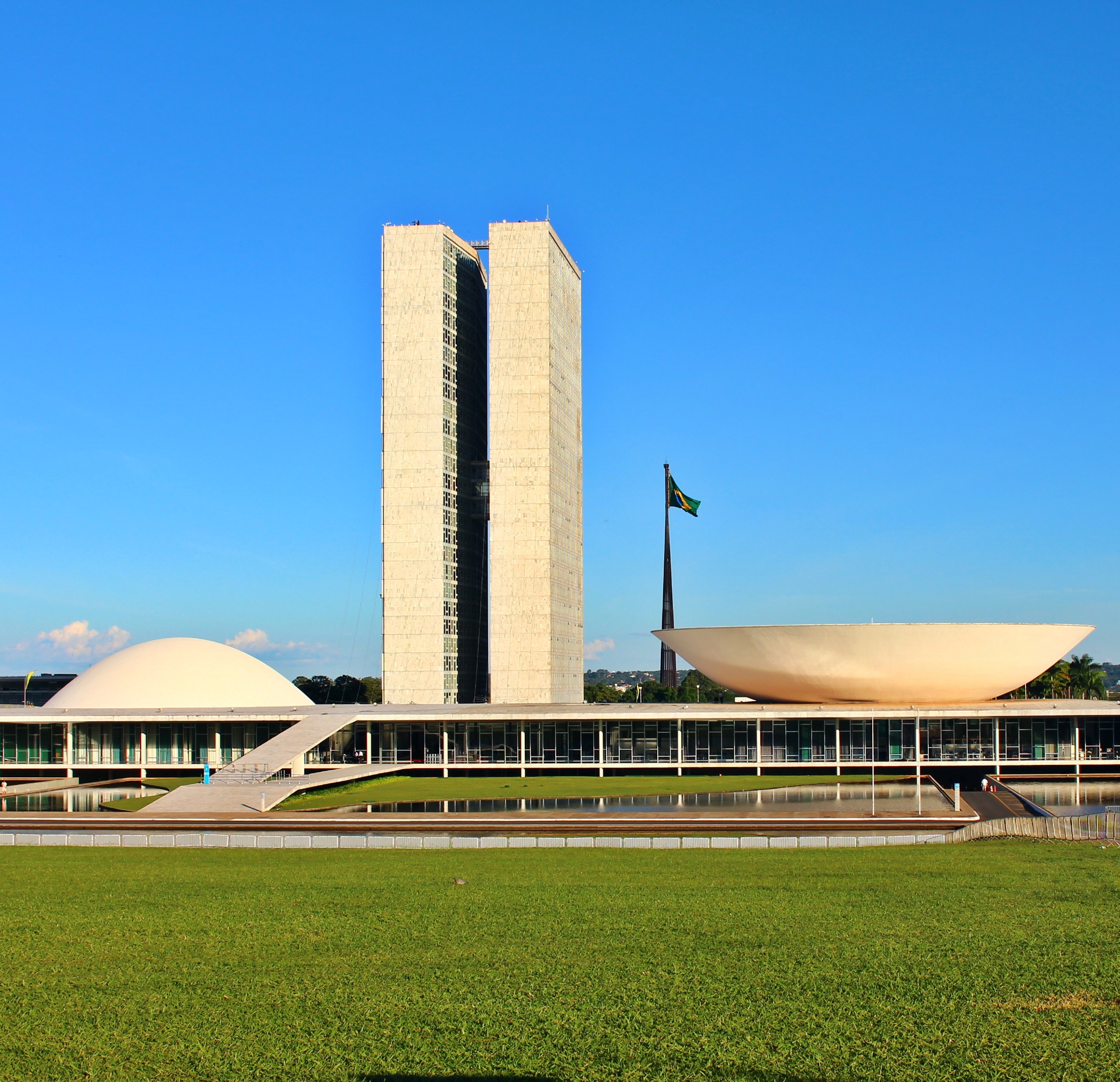
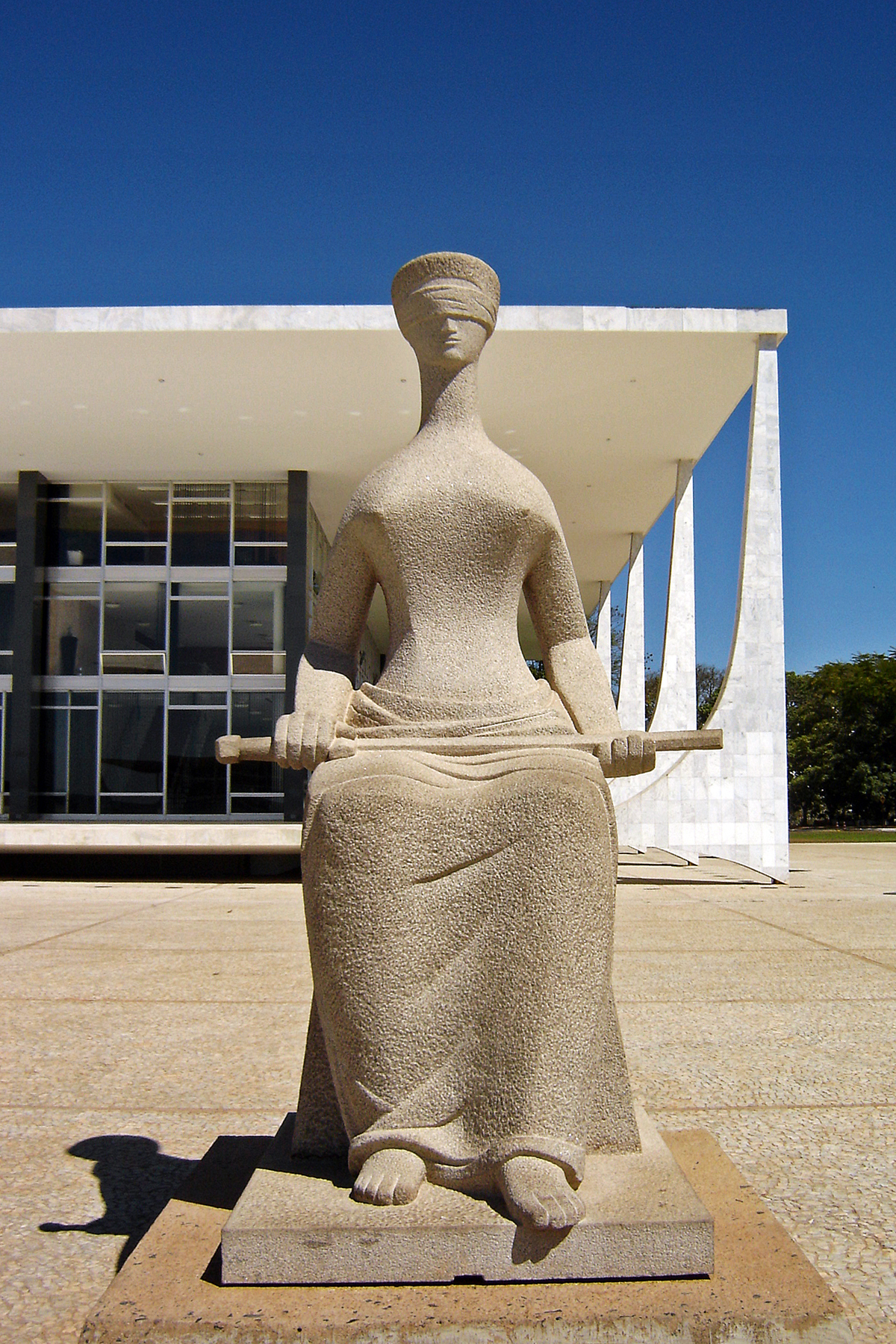
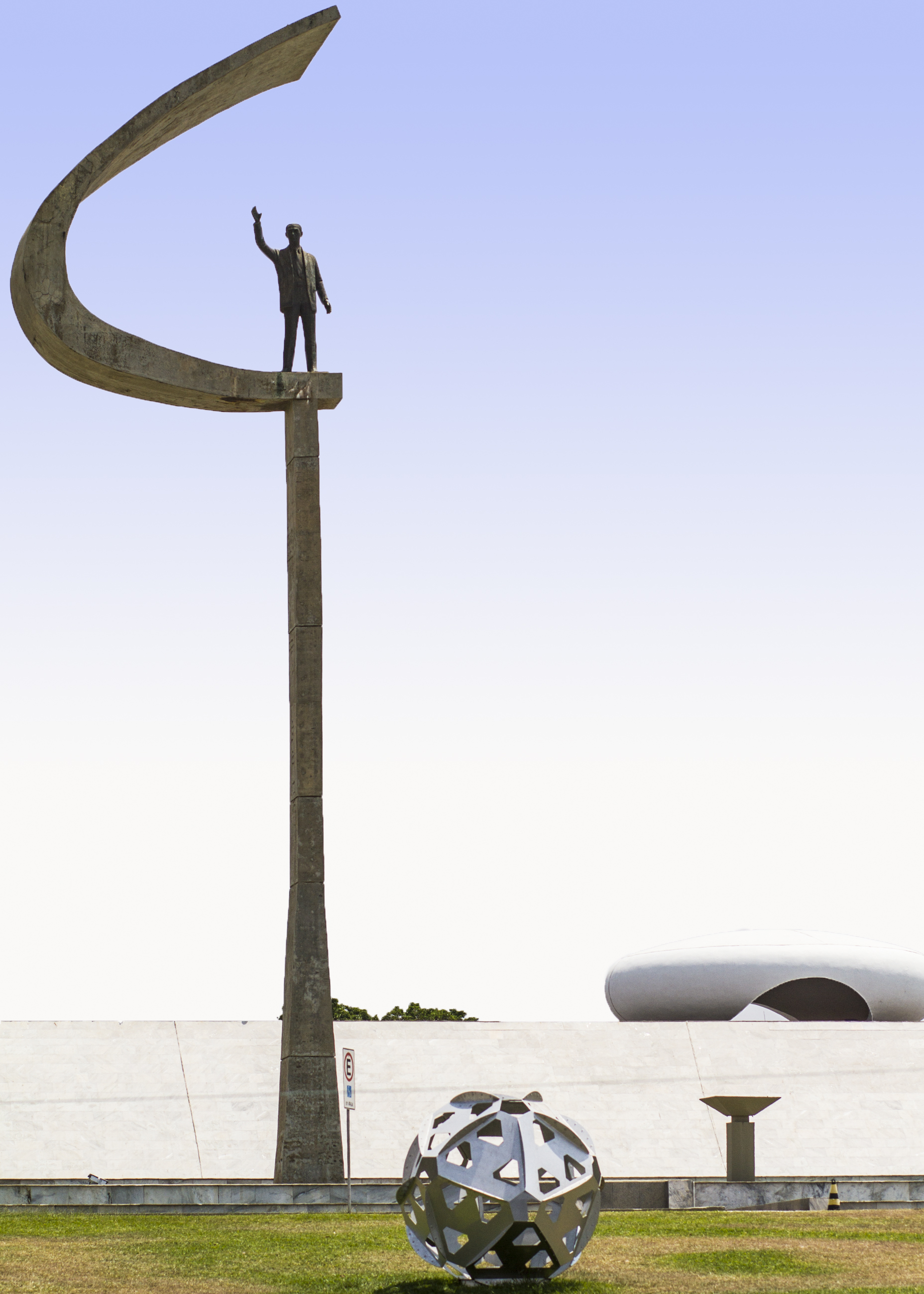
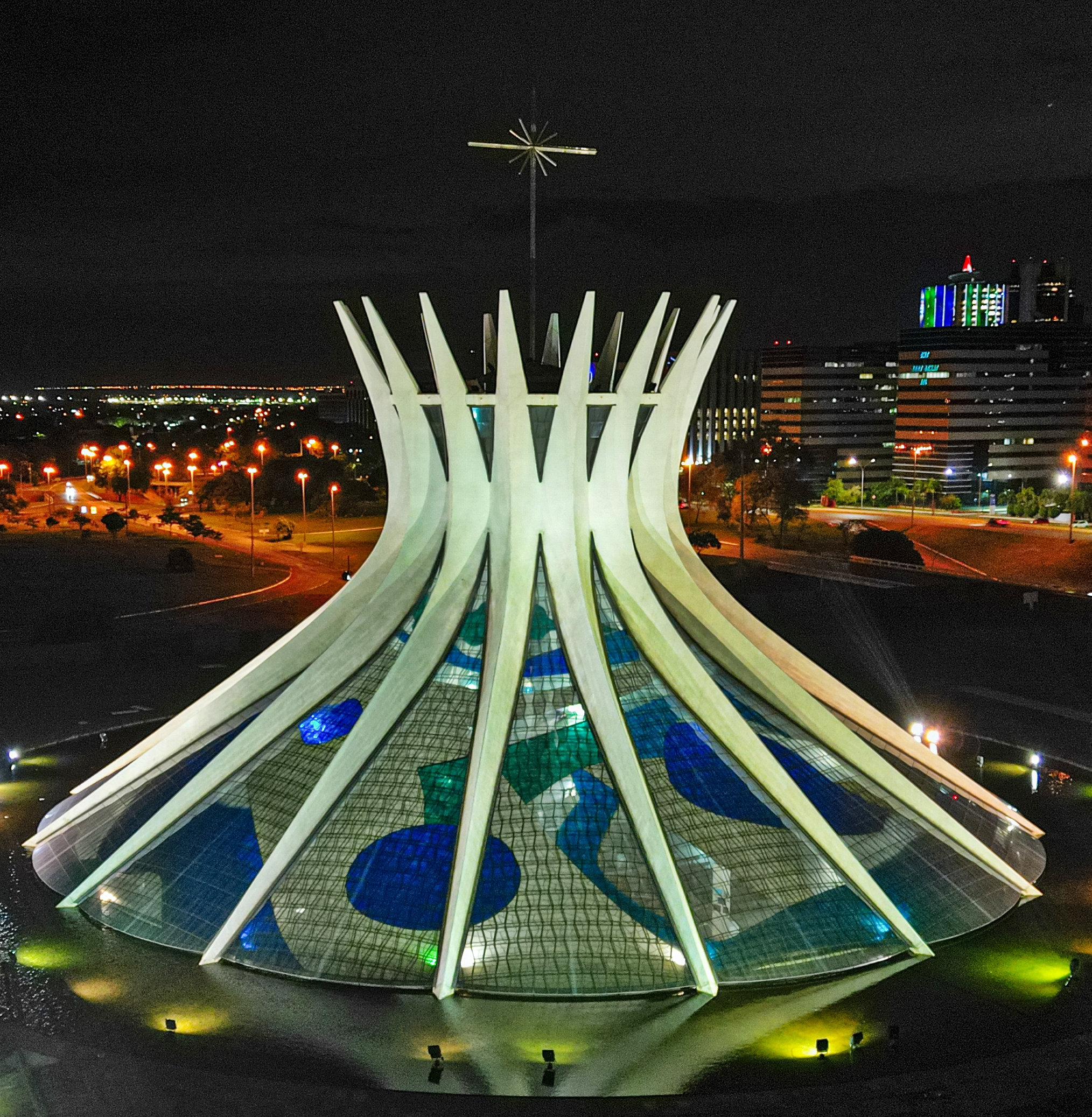
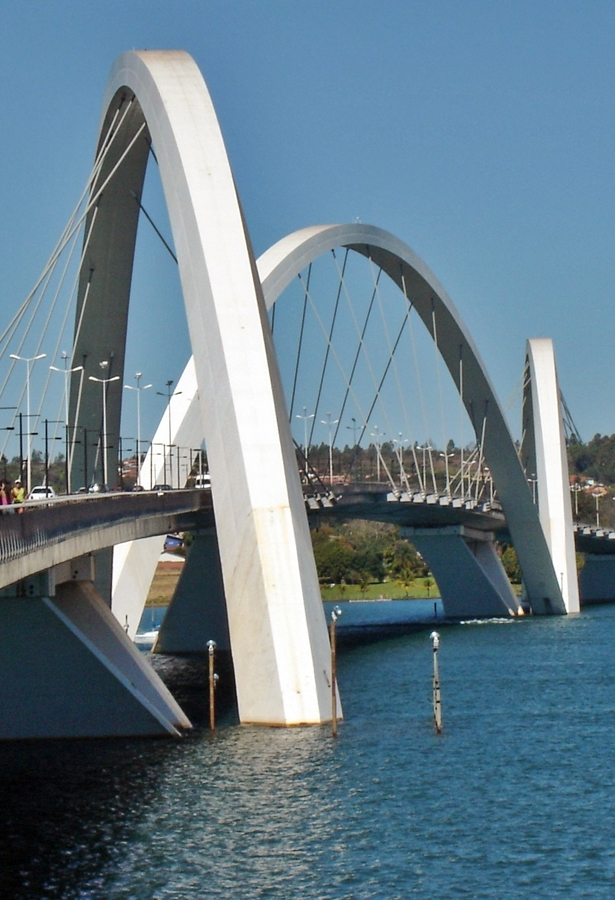
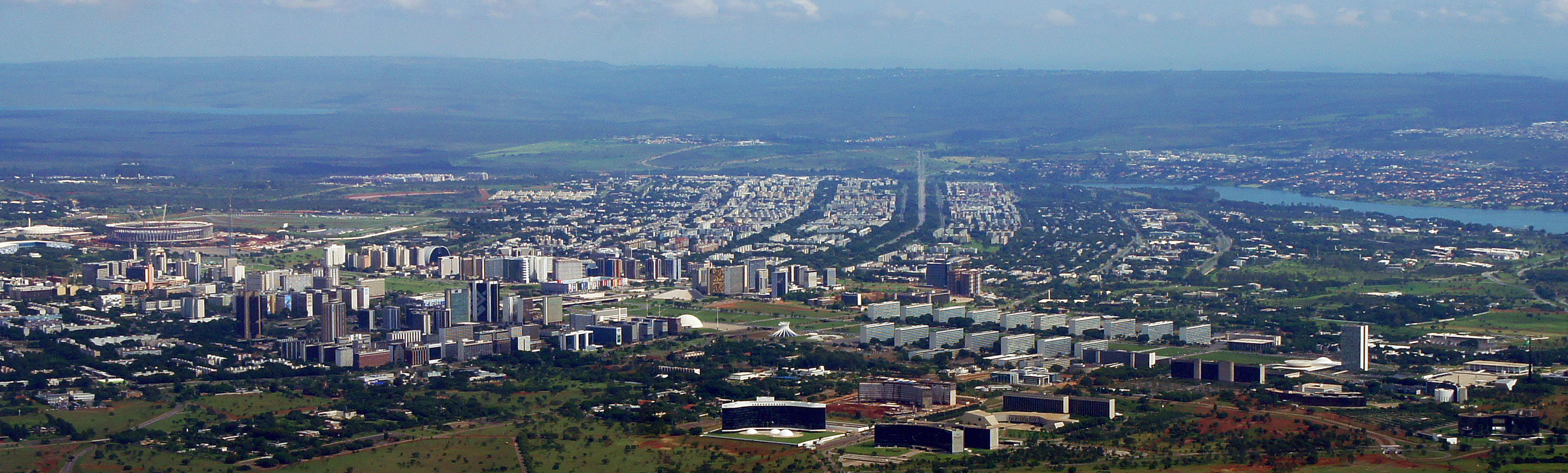
- Monumental Axis seen from the TV Tower Palácio do Planalto National Congress Supreme Court JK Memorial Cathedral of Brasília JK Bridge Panoramic view of the Pilot Plan of Brasília

- Flag Coat of arms
- Nicknames: Capital Federal, BSB, Capital da Esperança
- Motto: "Venturis ventis"(Latin) "To the coming winds"
- Interactive map of Brasília
- Location within Brazil Location within South America
- Coordinates: 15°47′38″S 47°52′58″W
- Country: Brazil
- Region: Central-West
- District: Federal District
- Founded: 21 April 1960; 66 years ago

Area
  - Federal capital: 5,802 km^{2} (2,240 sq mi)
- Elevation: 1,172 m (3,845 ft)

Population (2025)
  - Federal capital: 2,996,899 (3rd) (Note: This figure is the population of the entire Federal District. The administrative region of Plano Piloto was estimated to have a population of 221,326 in a 2018 survey; IBGE do not make this distinction and consider the entire district to be synonymous with Brasília for demographic purposes.)
  - Density: 489.06/km^{2} (1,266.7/sq mi)
  - Metro: 3,548,438 (4th)
- urban area is population of the Federal District; metro area includes 12 neighboring municipalities in Goiás
- Demonym(s): Brasiliense, Candango (slang)

GDP
  - Year: 2015 estimate
  - Total: $65.338 billion (8th)
  - Per capita: $21,779 (1st)

HDI
  - Year: 2021
  - HDI: 0.814 (1st)
- Time zone: UTC−03:00 (BRT)
- Postal code: 70000-000
- Area code: +55 61
- Website: brasilia.df.gov.br (in Portuguese)

UNESCO World Heritage Site
- Official name: Brasilia
- Type: Cultural
- Criteria: i, iv
- Designated: 1987 (11th session)
- Reference no.: 445
- Region: Latin America and the Caribbean

Brasília (/brəˈzɪliə/ brə-ZIL-ee-ə; Brazilian Portuguese: [bɾaˈziliɐ, bɾaˈziljɐ]) is the capital city of Brazil and the Federal District. Located in the Brazilian Highlands in the country's Central-West region, it was founded by President Juscelino Kubitschek on 21 April 1960, to replace Rio de Janeiro as the national capital. Brasília is Brazil's third-most populous city after São Paulo and Rio de Janeiro, with a population of 2.8 million. Among major Latin American cities, it has the highest GDP per capita.

Brasília is a planned city developed by Lúcio Costa, Oscar Niemeyer, and Joaquim Cardozo in 1956 in a scheme to move the capital from Rio de Janeiro to a more central location, which was chosen through a committee. The landscape architect was Roberto Burle Marx. The city's design divides it into numbered blocks as well as sectors for specified activities, such as the Hotel Sector, the Banking Sector, the Commercial Sector, and the Embassy Sector. Brasília was inscribed as a UNESCO World Heritage Site in 1987 due to its modernist architecture and uniquely artistic urban planning. It was named "City of Design" by UNESCO in October 2017 and has been part of the Creative Cities Network since then.

It is notable for its white-colored, modern architecture, designed by Oscar Niemeyer. All three branches of Brazil's federal government are located in the city: executive, legislative and judiciary. Brasília also hosts 124 foreign embassies. The city's international airport connects it to all other major Brazilian cities and some international destinations, and it is the third-busiest airport in Brazil. It was one of the main host cities of the 2014 FIFA World Cup and hosted some of the football matches during the 2016 Summer Olympics; it also hosted the 2013 FIFA Confederations Cup.

Laid out in the shape of an airplane, (Note: The idea that Brasília was designed to look like an airplane is a myth. According to Lúcio Costa, it is a cross that was adjusted in accordance to the landscape of the construction site.) its "fuselage" is the Monumental Axis, a pair of wide avenues flanking a large park. In the "cockpit" is Praça dos Três Poderes, named for the 3 branches of government surrounding it. Brasília has a unique legal status, as it is an administrative region rather than a municipality like other cities in Brazil. The name "Brasília" is often used as a synonym for the Federal District as a whole, which is divided into 35 administrative regions, one of which (Plano Piloto) includes the area of the originally planned city and its federal government buildings. The entire Federal District is considered by IBGE to make up Brasília's city area, and the local government considers the entirety of the district plus 12 neighboring municipalities in the state of Goiás to be its metropolitan area.

== Etymology ==
The term Brasília comes from the Latin translation of Brazil, which was suggested as a name for the country's capital in 1821 by José Bonifácio de Andrada e Silva.

== History ==
=== Background ===
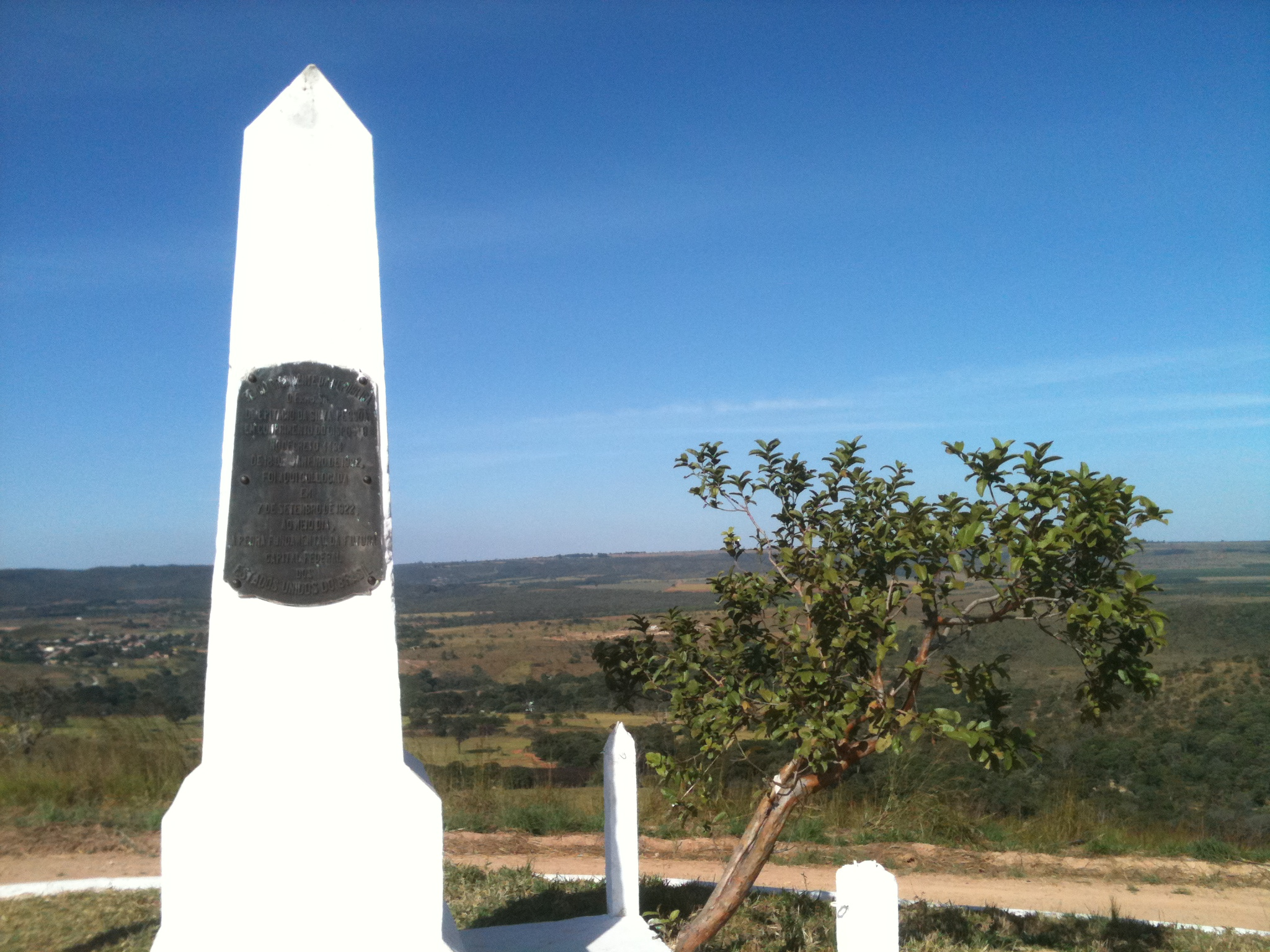
The foundation stone of Brasília, Centennial Hill, erected in 1922 to celebrate the 100th anniversary of Brazil's independence

Brazil's first capital was Salvador; in 1763 Rio de Janeiro became Brazil's capital and remained so until 1960. During this period, resources tended to be centered in Brazil's southeastern region, and most of the country's population was concentrated near its Atlantic coast. Brasilia's geographically central location fostered a more regionally neutral federal capital.

The idea of relocating Brazil's capital city was conceived in 1827 by José Bonifácio, an advisor to Emperor Pedro I. He presented a plan to the General Assembly of Brazil for a new city called Brasília, with the idea of moving the capital westward from the heavily populated southeastern corridor. The original plan was to build Brasília upstream at the São Francisco River, instead of the later plans in the region around Goiás. The bill was not enacted because Pedro I dissolved the Assembly.

According to a legend, Italian saint Don Bosco in 1883 had a dream in which he described a futuristic city that roughly fitted Brasília's location. In Brasília today, many references to Bosco, who founded the Salesian order, are found throughout the city and one church parish in the city bears his name.

After the Proclamation of the Republic, the Third Article of the new Constitution from 1891 stated that the capital should be moved from Rio de Janeiro to a place close to the country's center. Stating that "The Union shall own, in the central plateau of the Republic, an area of 14,400 square kilometers, which will be demarcated in due course to establish the future federal capital."

The government commissioned Belgian geodesist and astronomer Luís Cruls for a mission into the Central Plateau for surveying the land for the future capital, having done two expeditions in 1892 and 1894. The land demarcated for the future federal capital was denominated the Cruls Quadrilateral (Quadrilátero Cruls), and the proposed name for the new capital was Vera Cruz (in reference to the first name of Brazil, Ilha de Vera Cruz). However, the project was considered too ambitious, challenging and costly, and the idea of a new capital remained a very low priority for the governments of the Old Republic.

In 1922 to celebrate the 100th anniversary of Brazil's independence, President Epitácio Pessoa ordered the construction of an obelisk in the Cruls Quadrilateral, known as the Foundation Stone of Brasília, to mark the location of the future capital.

=== Costa plan ===
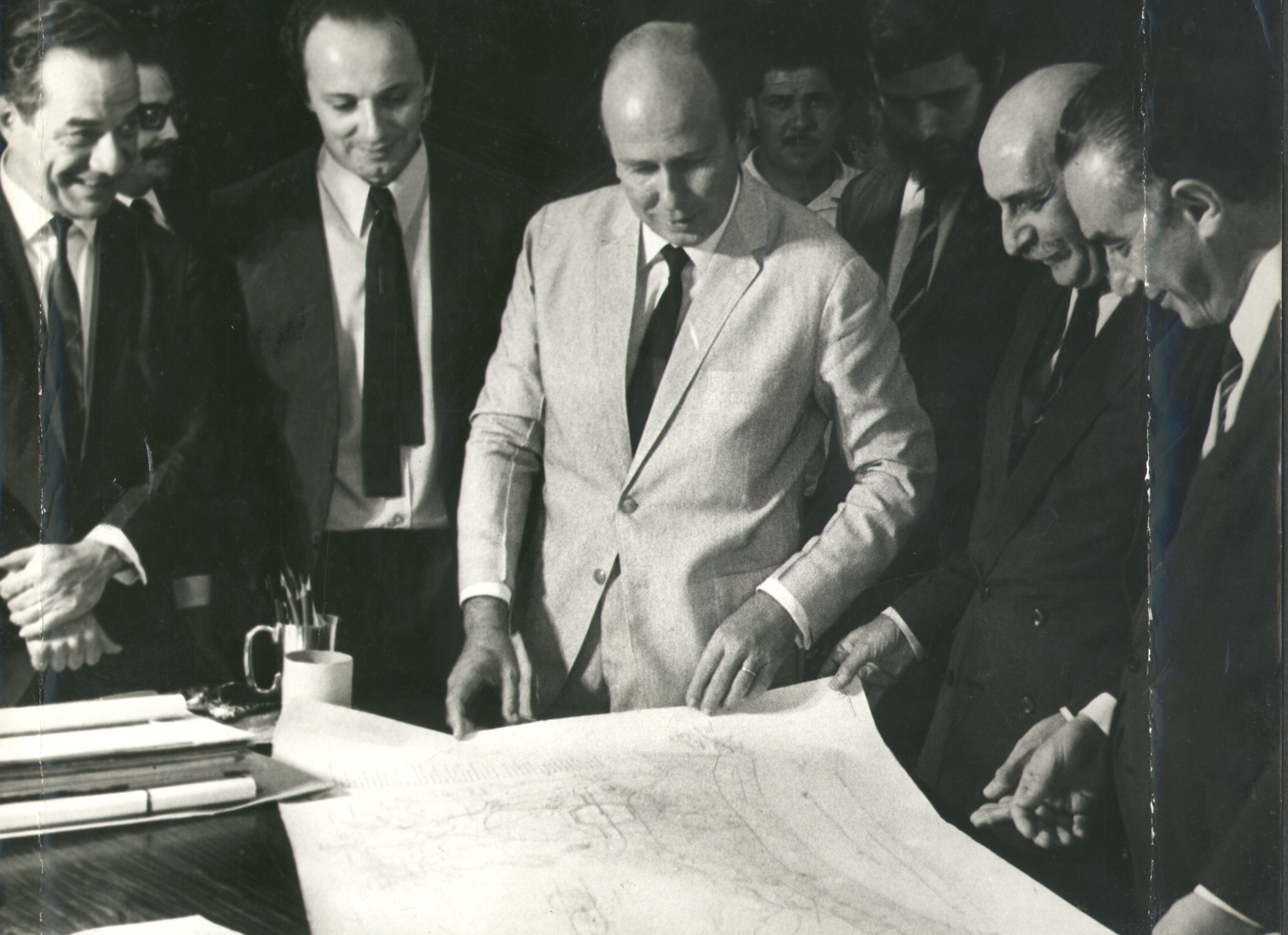
Urban planner Lúcio Costa was the winner of the competition for the construction project of Brasília and played a key role in the city's landmarking.

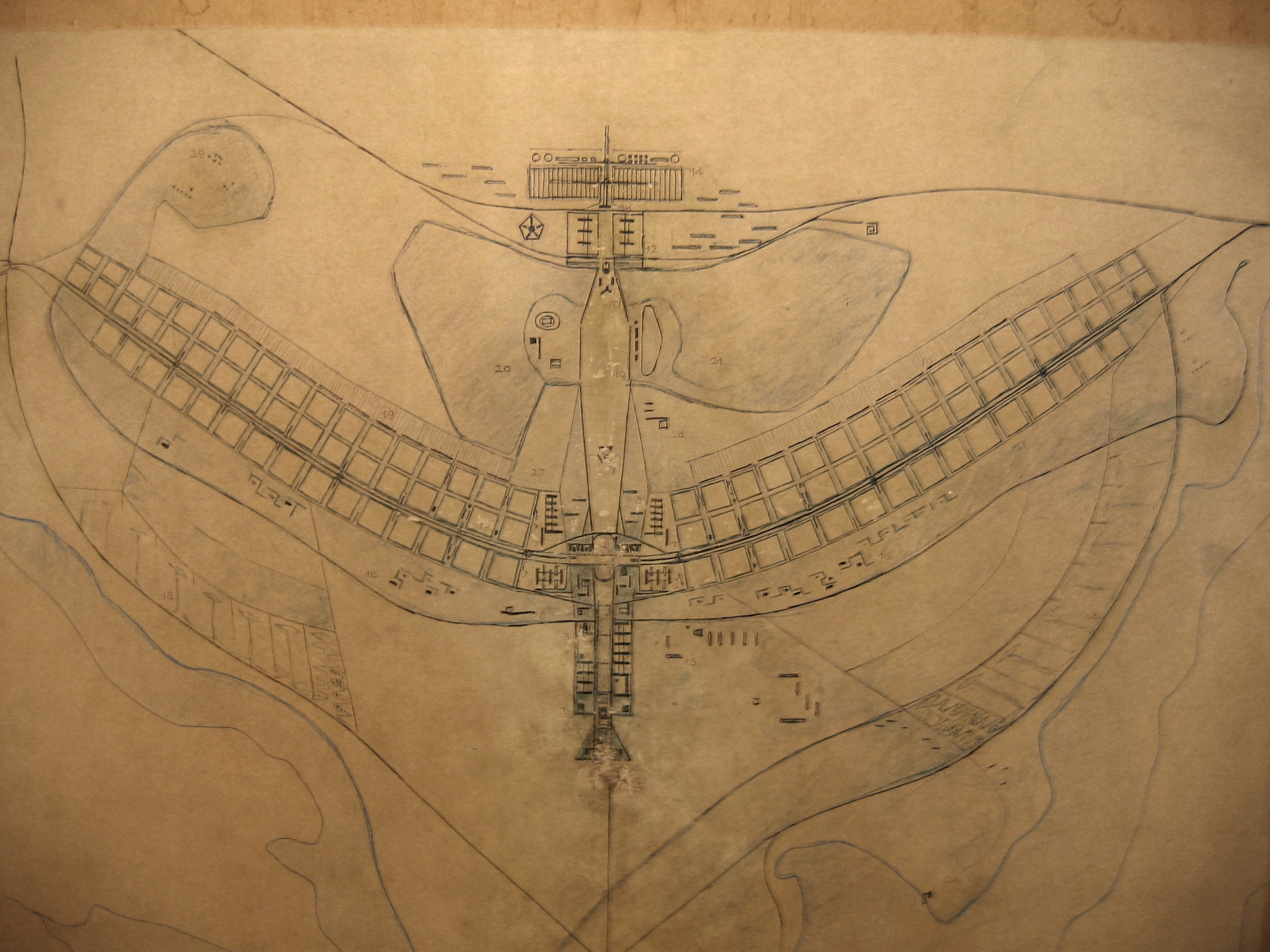
Plano Piloto

Juscelino Kubitschek was elected President of Brazil in 1955. Upon taking office in January 1956, in fulfilment of his campaign pledge, he initiated the planning and construction of the new capital. The following year an international jury selected Lúcio Costa's plan to guide the construction of Brazil's new capital, Brasília. Costa was a student of French-Swiss architect Le Corbusier, and some of modernism's architecture features can be found in his plan. Costa's plan was not as detailed as some of the plans presented by other architects and city planners. It did not include land use schedules, models, population charts or mechanical drawings; however, it was chosen by five out of six jurors because it had the features required to align the growth of a capital city. Even though the initial plan was transformed over time, it oriented much of the construction and most of its features survived.

Brasília's ascension as the new capital and its designation for the development of an extensive interior region inspired the symbolism of the plan. Costa used a cross-axial design indicating the possession and conquest of this new place with a cross, often likened to a dragonfly, an airplane or a bird. Costa's plan included two principal components, the Monumental Axis (east to west) and the Residential Axis (north to south). The Monumental Axis was assigned political and administrative activities, and is considered the body of the city with the style and simplicity of its buildings, oversized scales, and broad vistas and heights, producing the idea of Monumentality. This axis includes the various ministries, national congress, presidential palace, supreme court building and the television and radio tower. The Residential Axis was intended to contain areas with intimate character and is considered the most important achievement of the plan; it was designed for housing and associated functions such as local commerce, schooling, recreation and churches, constituted of 96 superblocks limited to six-story buildings and 12 additional superblocks limited to three-story buildings; Costa's intention with superblocks was to have small self-contained and self-sufficient neighborhoods and uniform buildings with apartments of two or three different categories, where he envisioned the integration of upper and middle classes sharing the same residential area.

The urban design of the communal apartment blocks was based on Le Corbusier's Ville Radieuse of 1935, and the superblocks on the North American Radburn layout from 1929. Visually, the blocks were intended to appear absorbed by the landscape because they were isolated by a belt of tall trees and lower vegetation. Costa attempted to introduce a Brazil that was more equitable, he also designed housing for the working classes that was separated from the upper- and middle-class housing and was visually different, with the intention of avoiding slums (favelas) in the urban periphery. The superquadra has been accused of being a space where individuals are oppressed and alienated to a form of spatial segregation.

One of the main objectives of the plan was to allow the free flow of automobile traffic. The plan included lanes of traffic in a north–south direction (seven for each direction) for the Monumental Axis and three arterials (the W3, the Eixo and the L2) for the residential Axis; the cul-de-sac access roads of the superblocks were planned to be the end of the main flow of traffic. The reason behind the heavy emphasis on automobile traffic was the architect's desire to establish the concept of modernity in every level.

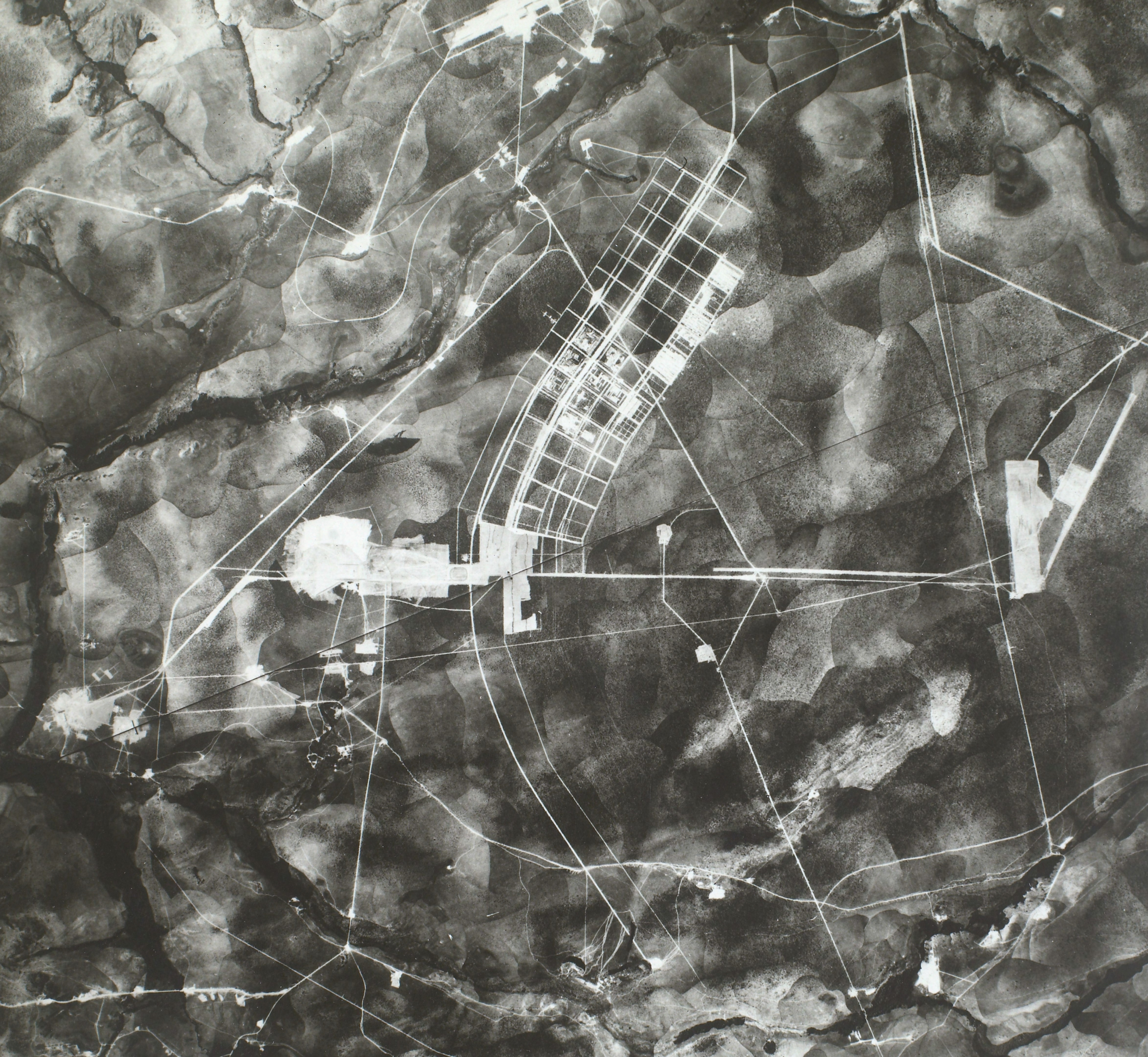
Brasília in 1958. Only Asa Sul is already leased, and Ministries Esplanade is also visible.

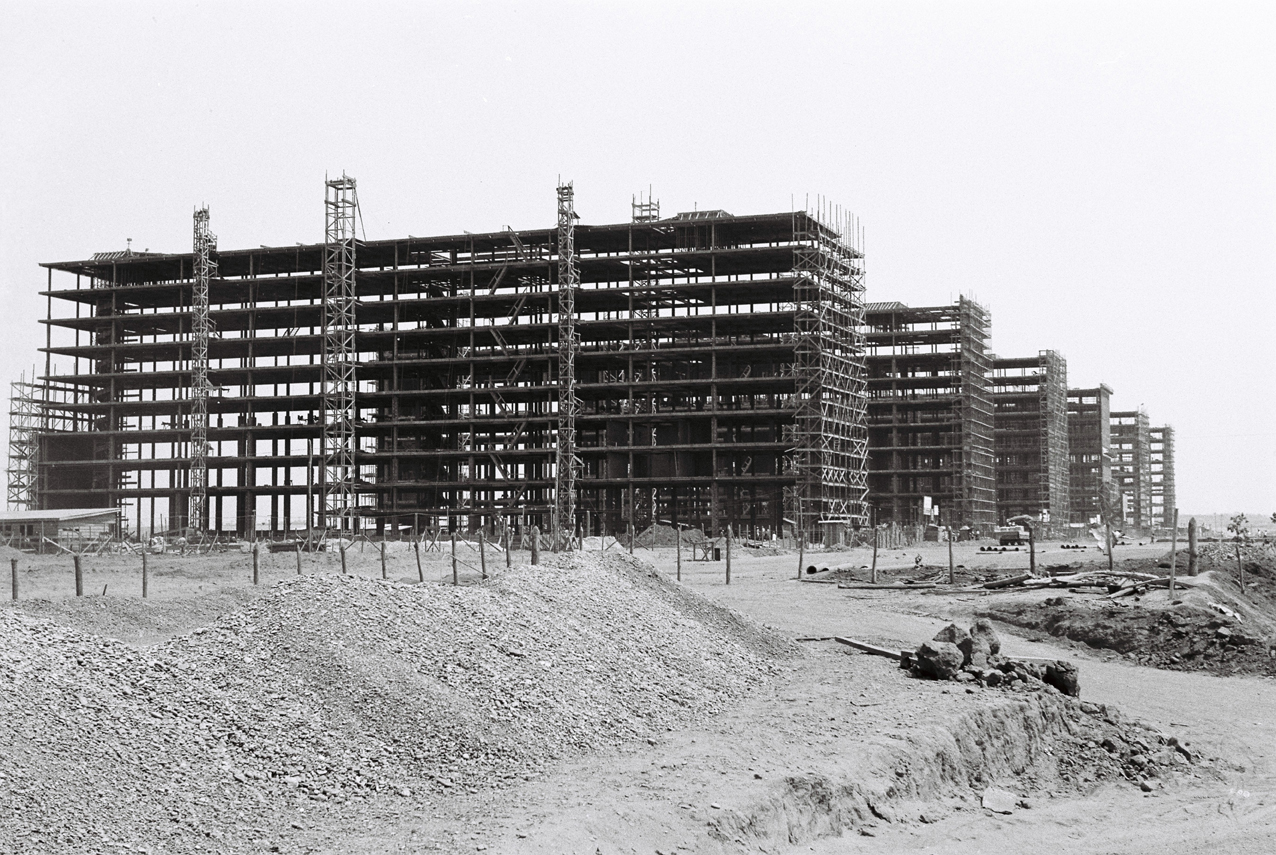
Construction of the Ministries Esplanade in 1959

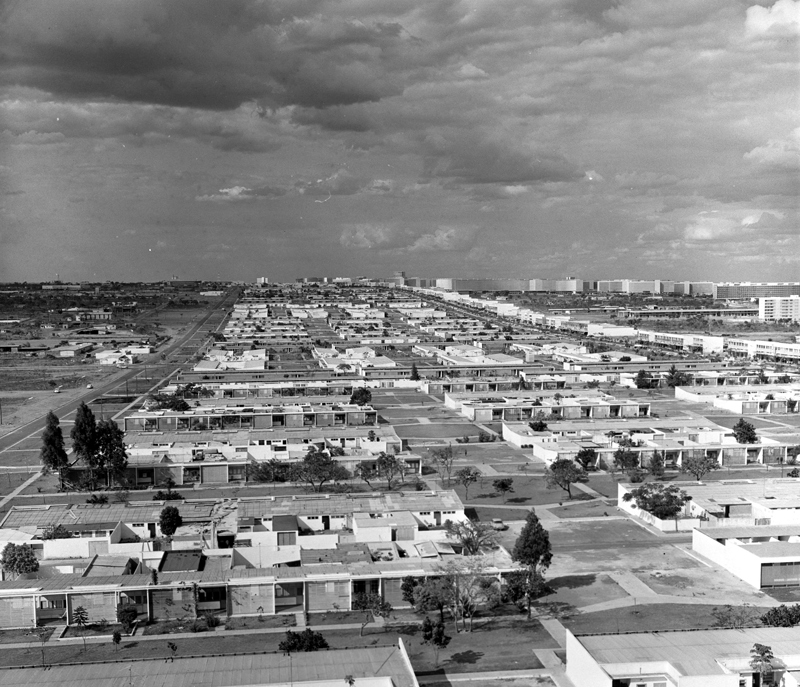
Brasília in 1964

Though automobiles were invented prior to the 20th century, mass production of vehicles in the early 20th made them widely available; thus, they became a symbol of modernity. The two small axes around the Monumental axis provide loops and exits for cars to enter small roads. Some argue that his emphasis of the plan on automobiles caused the lengthening of distances between centers and it attended only the necessities of a small segment of the population who owned cars. However, the value of the transportation system cannot be ignored. The buses routes inside the city operate heavily on W3 and L2. Almost anywhere, including satellite cities, can be reached just by taking the bus and most of the Plano Piloto can be reached without transferring to other buses.

Later, as the population of the city increased, the transportation system also played an important role in mediating the relationship between the Pilot plan and the satellite cities. Due to the larger influx of vehicles, traffic lights were introduced to the Monumental Axis, which violated the concept of modernity and advancement the architect first employed. Additionally, the metro system in Brasília was mainly built for inhabitants of satellite cities. Though the population growth has changed the footprint of the city, the transportation system has been able to connect the satellite cities to the main Pilot plan.

At the intersection of the Monumental and Residential Axis, Costa planned the city center with the transportation center (Rodoviaria), the banking sector and the hotel sector. Near to the city center, he proposed an amusement center with theaters, cinemas and restaurants. Costa's Plan is seen as a plan with a sectoral tendency, segregating all the banks, the office buildings, and the amusement center.

One of the main features of Costa's plan was that he presented a new city with its future shape and patterns evident from the beginning, meaning that the original plan included paving streets that were not immediately put into use. The advantage of this was that the original plan is hard to undo because he provided for an entire street network, however, it is difficult to adapt to potential future circumstances. In addition, there has been controversy with the monumental aspect of Lúcio Costa's Plan, because it appeared to some as 19th century city planning, not modern 20th century urbanism.

An interesting analysis can be made of Brasília within the context of Cold War politics and the association of Lúcio Costa's plan to the symbolism of aviation. From an architectural perspective, the airplane-shaped plan was certainly an homage to Le Corbusier and his enchantment with the aircraft as an architectural masterpiece. However, Brasília was constructed soon after the end of World War II. Despite Brazil's minor participation in the conflict, the airplane shape of the city was key in envisioning the country as part of the newly globalized world, together with the victorious Allies. Furthermore, Brasília is a unique example of modernism both as a guideline for architectural design but also as a principle for organizing society. Modernism in Brasília is explored in James Holston's 1989 book, The Modernist City.

=== Construction ===
Juscelino Kubitschek, president of Brazil from 1956 to 1961, ordered Brasília's construction, fulfilling the promise of the Constitution and his own political campaign promise. Building Brasília was part of Juscelino's "fifty years of prosperity in five" plan. Already in 1892, the astronomer Louis Cruls, in the service of the Brazilian government, had investigated the site for the future capital. Lúcio Costa won a contest and was the main urban planner in 1957, with 5550 people competing. Oscar Niemeyer was the chief architect of most public buildings, Joaquim Cardozo was the structural engineer, and Roberto Burle Marx was the landscape designer. Brasília was built in 41 months, and was officially inaugurated in 21 April 1960.

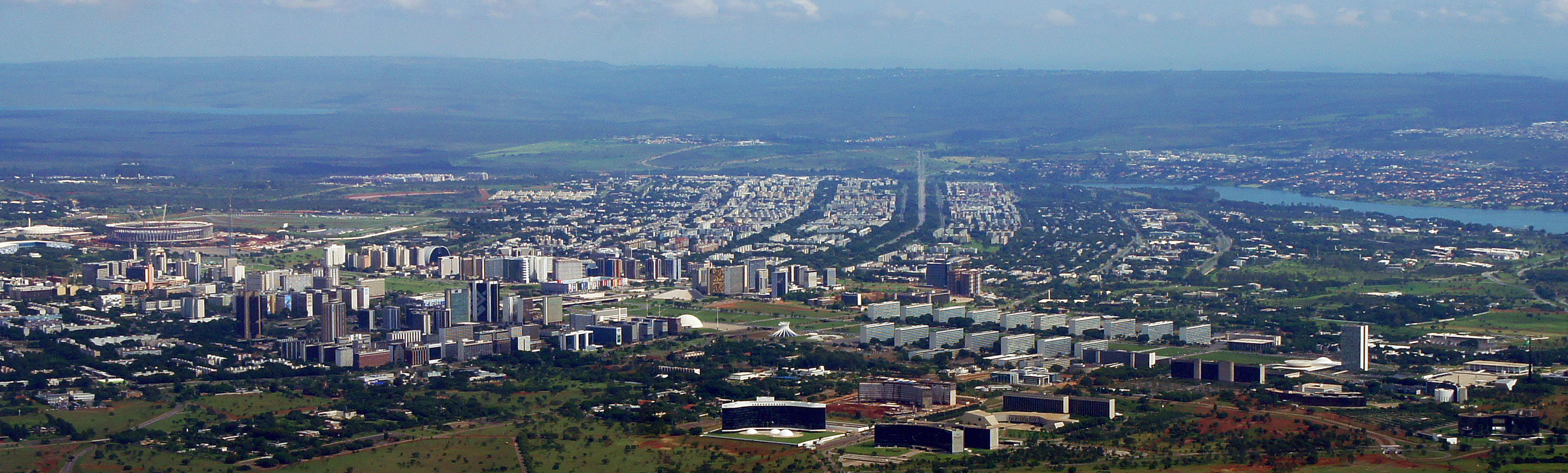
Aerial view of downtown Brasília (Pilot Plan) along the Monumental Axis, especially the new Mane Garrincha Stadium (left), the National Congress and the Three Powers Plaza (right). The entire residential area of North Wing (Asa Norte) is seen in the middle of the image.

== Geography ==
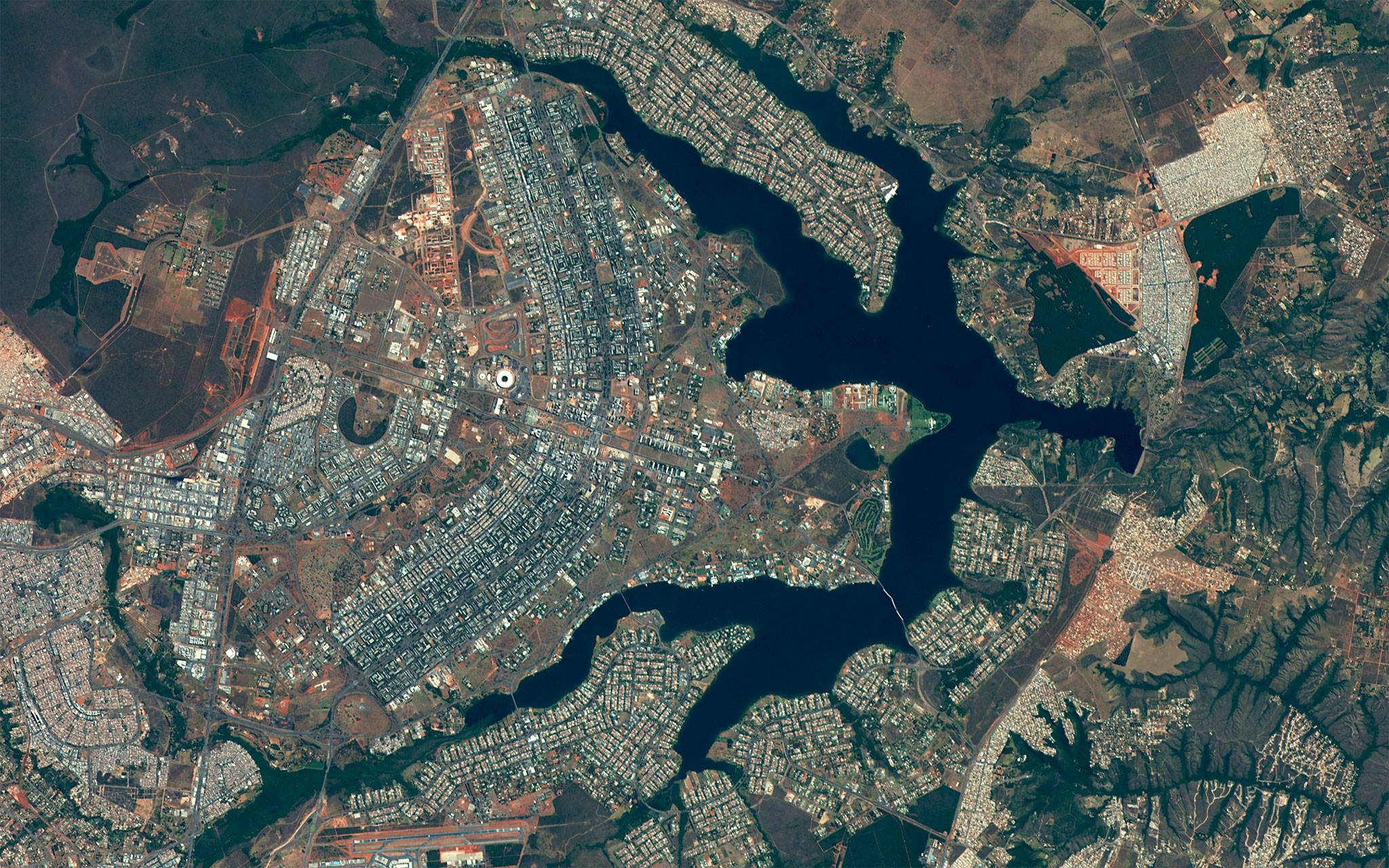
Brasília from Hodoyoshi 1 satellite

The city sits at an elevation of 1,000 metres (3,300 ft), on the Brazilian Highlands in the country's central-western region. Paranoá Lake, a large artificial lake, was built to increase the amount of water available and to maintain the region's humidity. It has a marina, and hosts wakeboarders and windsurfers. Diving can also be practiced; one of the main attractions is Vila Amaury, an old village submerged in the lake where the first construction workers of Brasília lived.

=== Climate ===
Brasília has a tropical savanna climate (Aw, according to the Köppen climate classification), milder due to the elevation and with two distinct seasons: the rainy season, from October to April, and the dry season, from May to September. The average temperature is 21.4 °C (70.5 °F). September, at the end of the dry season, has the highest average temperature, 29.1 °C (84.4 °F), while July has the lowest average temperature at 13.9 °C (57.0 °F). Average temperatures from September through March are a consistent 22 °C (72 °F). With 253.1 mm (10.0 in), November is the month with the highest rainfall of the year, while July is the lowest, with only 1.5 mm (0.1 in). During the dry season, the city can have very low relative humidity levels, often below 30%.

According to the Brazilian National Institute of Meteorology (INMET), the record low temperature was 1.6 °C (34.9 °F) on 18 July 1975, and the record high was 36.4 °C (97.5 °F) on 18 October 2015 and 8 October 2020. The highest accumulated rainfall in 24 hours was 132.8 mm (5.2 in) on 15 November 1963.

Climate data for Brasília (1991–2020, extremes 1961–present)
Month	Jan	Feb	Mar	Apr	May	Jun	Jul	Aug	Sep	Oct	Nov	Dec	Year
Record high °C (°F)	32.6 (90.7)	32.0 (89.6)	32.1 (89.8)	31.6 (88.9)	31.6 (88.9)	31.6 (88.9)	30.8 (87.4)	33.0 (91.4)	35.7 (96.3)	36.4 (97.5)	34.5 (94.1)	33.7 (92.7)	36.4 (97.5)
Mean daily maximum °C (°F)	26.9 (80.4)	27.2 (81.0)	27.0 (80.6)	26.8 (80.2)	26.0 (78.8)	25.3 (77.5)	25.6 (78.1)	27.4 (81.3)	29.1 (84.4)	29.0 (84.2)	27.0 (80.6)	26.8 (80.2)	27.0 (80.6)
Daily mean °C (°F)	21.9 (71.4)	21.9 (71.4)	21.8 (71.2)	21.6 (70.9)	20.3 (68.5)	19.3 (66.7)	19.3 (66.7)	21.0 (69.8)	22.8 (73.0)	23.1 (73.6)	21.7 (71.1)	21.7 (71.1)	21.4 (70.5)
Mean daily minimum °C (°F)	18.3 (64.9)	18.2 (64.8)	18.2 (64.8)	17.7 (63.9)	15.6 (60.1)	14.2 (57.6)	13.9 (57.0)	15.3 (59.5)	17.6 (63.7)	18.5 (65.3)	18.1 (64.6)	18.3 (64.9)	17.0 (62.6)
Record low °C (°F)	12.2 (54.0)	11.0 (51.8)	14.5 (58.1)	10.7 (51.3)	3.2 (37.8)	3.3 (37.9)	1.6 (34.9)	5.0 (41.0)	9.0 (48.2)	10.2 (50.4)	11.4 (52.5)	11.4 (52.5)	1.6 (34.9)
Average precipitation mm (inches)	206.0 (8.11)	179.5 (7.07)	226.0 (8.90)	145.2 (5.72)	26.9 (1.06)	3.3 (0.13)	1.5 (0.06)	16.3 (0.64)	38.1 (1.50)	141.8 (5.58)	253.1 (9.96)	241.1 (9.49)	1,478.8 (58.22)
Average precipitation days (≥ 1.0 mm)	16	14	15	9	3	1	0	2	4	10	17	18	109
Average relative humidity (%)	74.7	74.2	76.1	72.2	65.4	58.8	51.0	43.5	46.4	58.8	74.5	76.0	64.3
Average dew point °C (°F)	17.2 (63.0)	17.3 (63.1)	17.6 (63.7)	16.7 (62.1)	14.2 (57.6)	11.8 (53.2)	9.7 (49.5)	8.7 (47.7)	10.6 (51.1)	14.2 (57.6)	17.0 (62.6)	17.4 (63.3)	14.4 (57.9)
Mean monthly sunshine hours	150.9	158.9	166.5	204.6	244.6	267.6	282.7	294.3	226.0	191.2	143.7	143.6	2,744.4
Percentage possible sunshine	38	45	44	58	69	80	81	82	63	49	37	35	62
Source 1: Instituto Nacional de Meteorologia
Source 2: Meteo Climat (record highs and lows), NOAA (dew point)

== Demographics ==
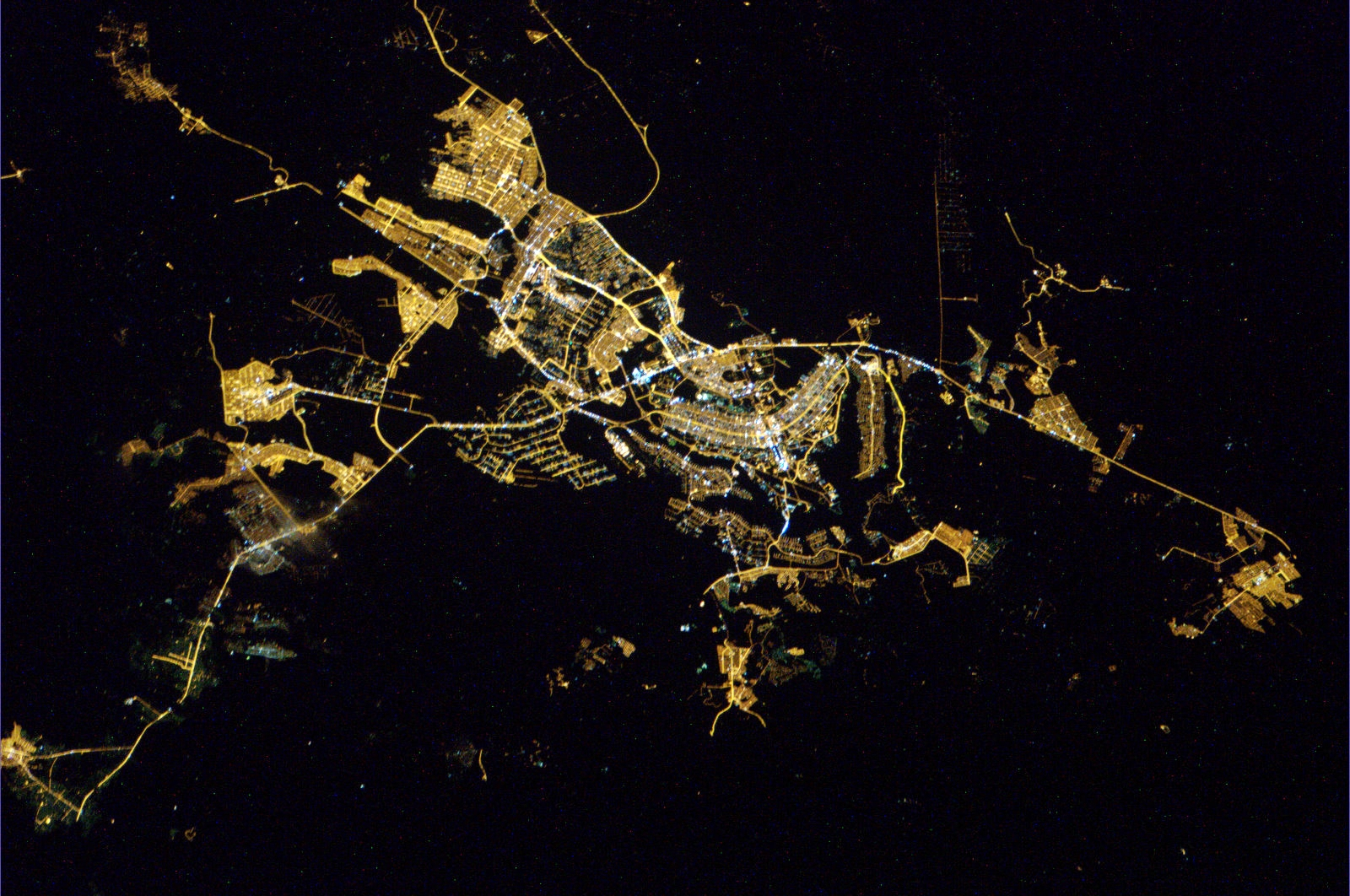
Brasília at night from ISS

=== Ethnic groups ===
Race and ethnicity in Brasília
Ethnicity	Percentage
Mixed	48.7%
White	40.0%
Black	10.7%
Asian	0.5%
Amerindian	0.1%

Historical population
Year	Pop.	±%
1960	141,742	—
1970	546,015	+285.2%
1980	1,203,333	+120.4%
1991	1,598,415	+32.8%
2000	2,043,169	+27.8%
2010	2,570,160	+25.8%
2022	2,817,381	+9.6%

According to the 2022 IBGE Census, 2,817,381 people resided in Brasília and its metropolitan area, of whom 1,370,836 were Mixed (48.7%), 1,126,334 White (40%), 301,765 Black (10.7%), 12,810 Asian (0.5%), and 5,536 Amerindian (0.1%).

In 2010, Brasília was ranked the fourth-most populous city in Brazil after São Paulo, Rio de Janeiro, and Salvador. In 2010, the city had 474,871 opposite-sex couples and 1,241 same-sex couples. The population of Brasília was 52.2% female and 47.8% male.

In the 1960 census there were almost 140,000 residents in the new Federal district. By 1970 this figure had grown to 537,000. By 2010 the population of the Federal District had surpassed 2.5 million. The city of Brasília proper, the plano piloto was planned for about 500,000 inhabitants, a figure the plano piloto never surpassed, with a current population of only 214,529, but its metropolitan area within the Federal District has grown past this figure.

From the beginning, the growth of Brasília was greater than original estimates. According to the original plans, Brasília would be a city for government authorities and staff. However, during its construction, Brazilians from all over the country migrated to the satellite cities of Brasília, seeking public and private employment.

At the close of the 20th century, Brasília was the largest city in the world which had not existed at the beginning of the century. Brasília has one of the highest population growth rates in Brazil, with annual growth of 2.82%, mostly due to internal migration.

Brasília's inhabitants include a foreign population of mostly embassy workers as well as large numbers of Brazilian internal migrants. Today, the city has important communities of immigrants and refugees. The city's Human Development Index was 0.936 in 2000 (developed level), and the city's literacy rate was around 95.65%.

=== Religion ===
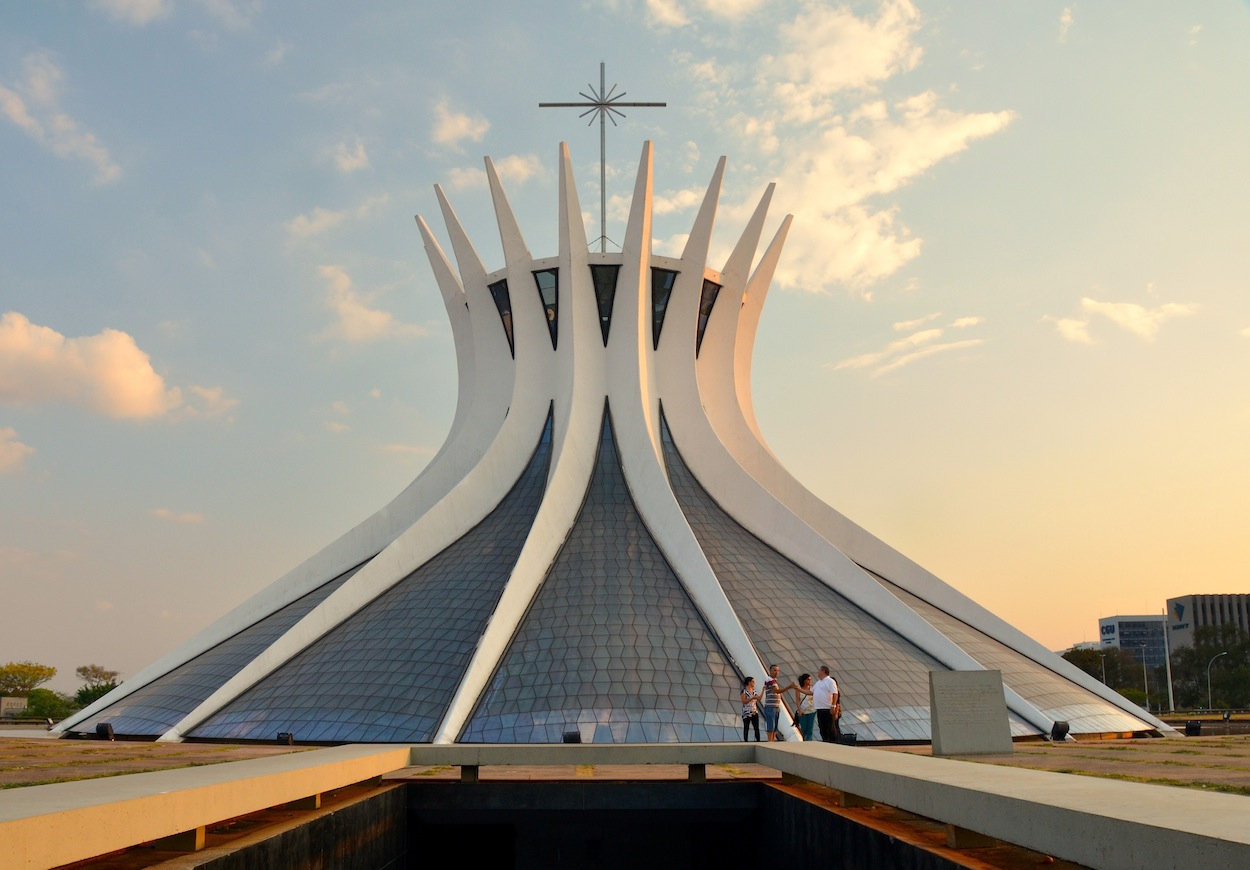
The Cathedral of Brasília

Christianity is by far the most prevalent religion in Brasília, with Roman Catholicism being the largest denomination.

Religion	Percentage
Catholic	49.74%
Protestant	29.21%
No religion	11.27%
Other	4.9%
Spiritist	3.27%
Umbanda and Candomblé	0.85%
Unknown	0.61%
Undeclared	0.13%
Indigenous religion	0.02%
Total	100.00%

Source: IBGE 2022.

== Government ==
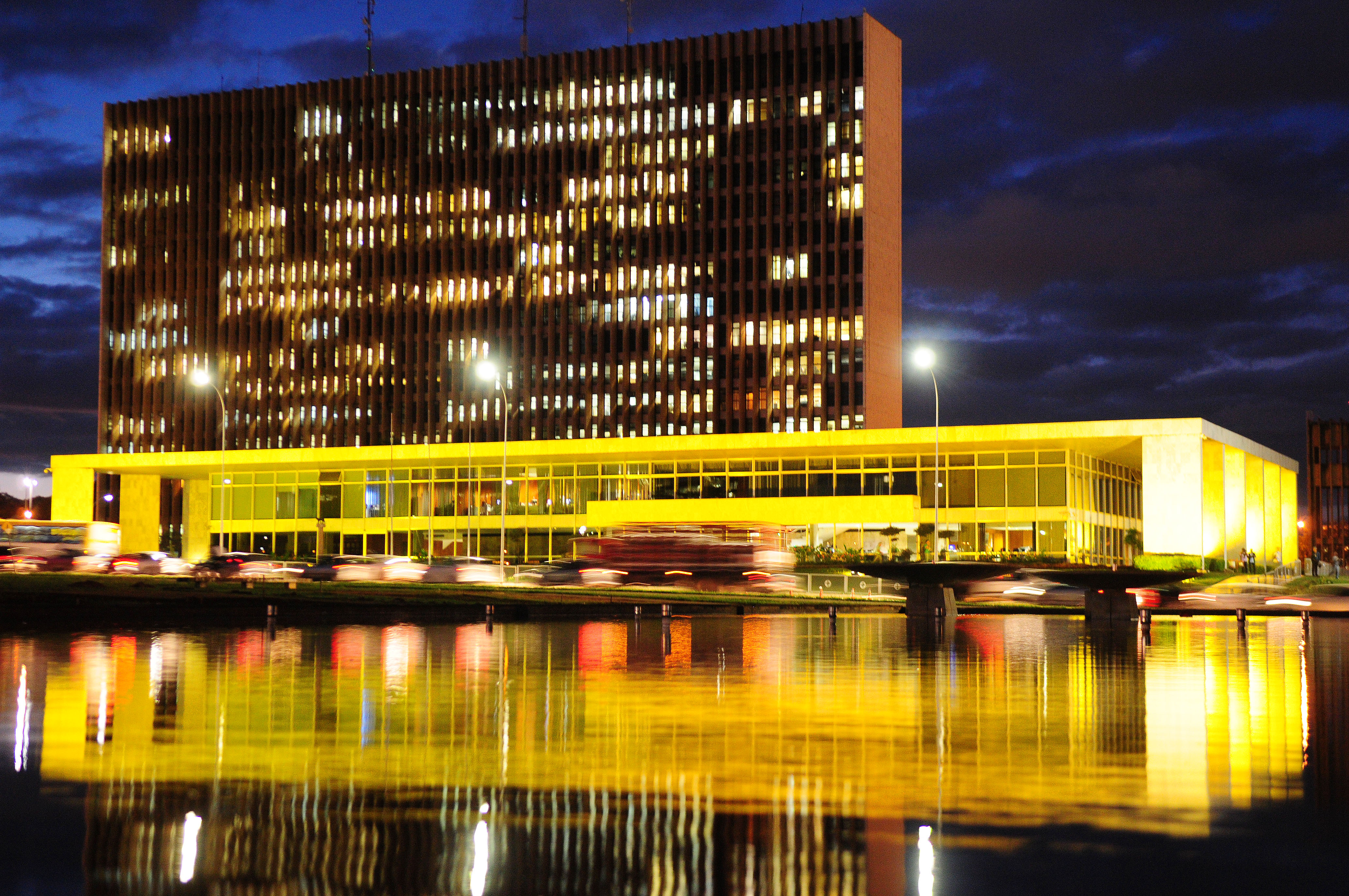
Palácio Buriti, seat of government of the Federal District

Brasília does not have a mayor or councillors, because article 32 of the Constitution of Brazil expressly prohibits the Federal District being divided into municipalities.

The Federal District is a legal entity of internal public law, which is part of the political-administrative structure of Brazil of a sui generis nature, because it is neither a state nor a municipality, but rather a special entity that incorporates the legislative powers reserved to the states and municipalities, as provided in Article 32, § 1º of the Constitution, which gives it a hybrid nature, both state and municipal.

The executive power of the Federal District was represented by the mayor of the Federal District until 1969, when the position was transformed into governor of the Federal District.

The legislative power of the Federal District is represented by the Legislative Chamber of the Federal District, whose nomenclature includes a mixture of legislative assembly (legislative power of the other units of the federation) and of municipal chamber (legislative of the municipalities). The Legislative Chamber is made up of 24 district deputies.

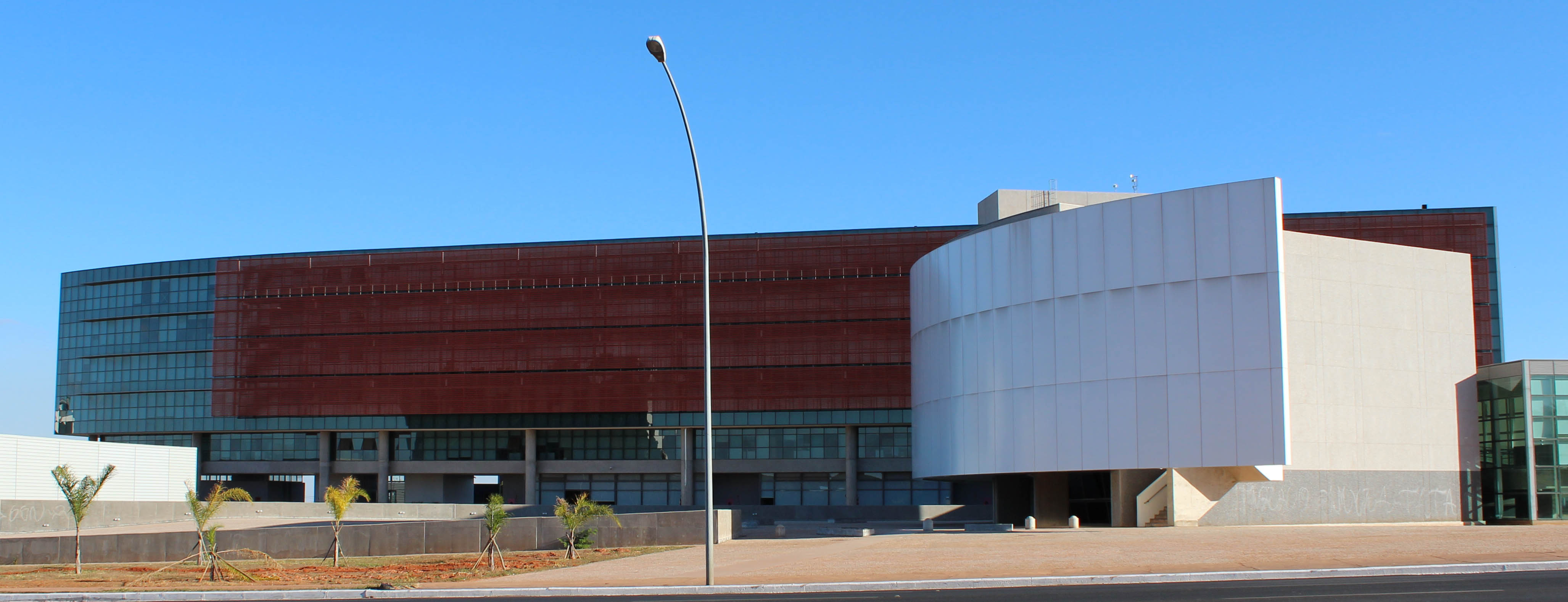
Legislative Chamber of the Federal District building

The judicial power which serves the Federal District also serves federal territories as it is constituted, but Brazil does not have any territories. Therefore, the Court of Justice of the Federal District and of the Territories only serves the Federal District.

Part of the budget of the Federal District Government comes from the Constitutional Fund of the Federal District. In 2012, the fund totaled 9.6 billion reais. By 2015, the forecast is 12.4 billion reais, of which more than half (6.4 billion) is spent on public security spending.

=== International relations ===
Twin towns and sister cities

Brasília is twinned with:

- Abuja, Nigeria
- Asunción, Paraguay
- Brussels, Belgium
- Buenos Aires, Argentina (since 2002)
- Gaza City, Palestine
- Havana, Cuba
- Khartoum, Sudan
- Lisbon, Portugal
- Luxor, Egypt
- Montevideo, Uruguay
- Pretoria, South Africa
- Santiago, Chile
- Tehran, Iran
- Vienna, Austria
- Washington, D.C., United States (since 2013)
- Xi'an, China (since 1997)
- Guadalajara, Mexico.

Of these, Abuja and Washington, D.C. were also cities specifically planned as the seat of government of their respective countries.

Brasília Declarations

Brasília is associated with several significant declarations in the international political and social field, including:

- The Brasília Declaration of the IBSA Dialogue Forum (2003), signed by the foreign ministers of India, Brazil and South Africa (IBSA) regarding representation at the United Nations Security Council
- Brasília Declaration on the Protection of Refugees and Stateless Persons in the Americas (2010)
- Brasília Declaration on Child Labour (2013), issued by the Third Global Conference on Child Labour – hosted in Brasília by the Brazilian Government
- Brasília Declaration of Judges on Water Justice (2018), adopted in 2018 during the Conference of Judges and Prosecutors on Water Justice at the 8th World Water Forum, described as "a landmark in [the] development of water justice jurisprudence"
- The 15th Conference of Defense Ministers of the Americas, meeting in Brasília in 2022, issued a Declaration condemning Russia's invasion of Ukraine.

== Economy ==
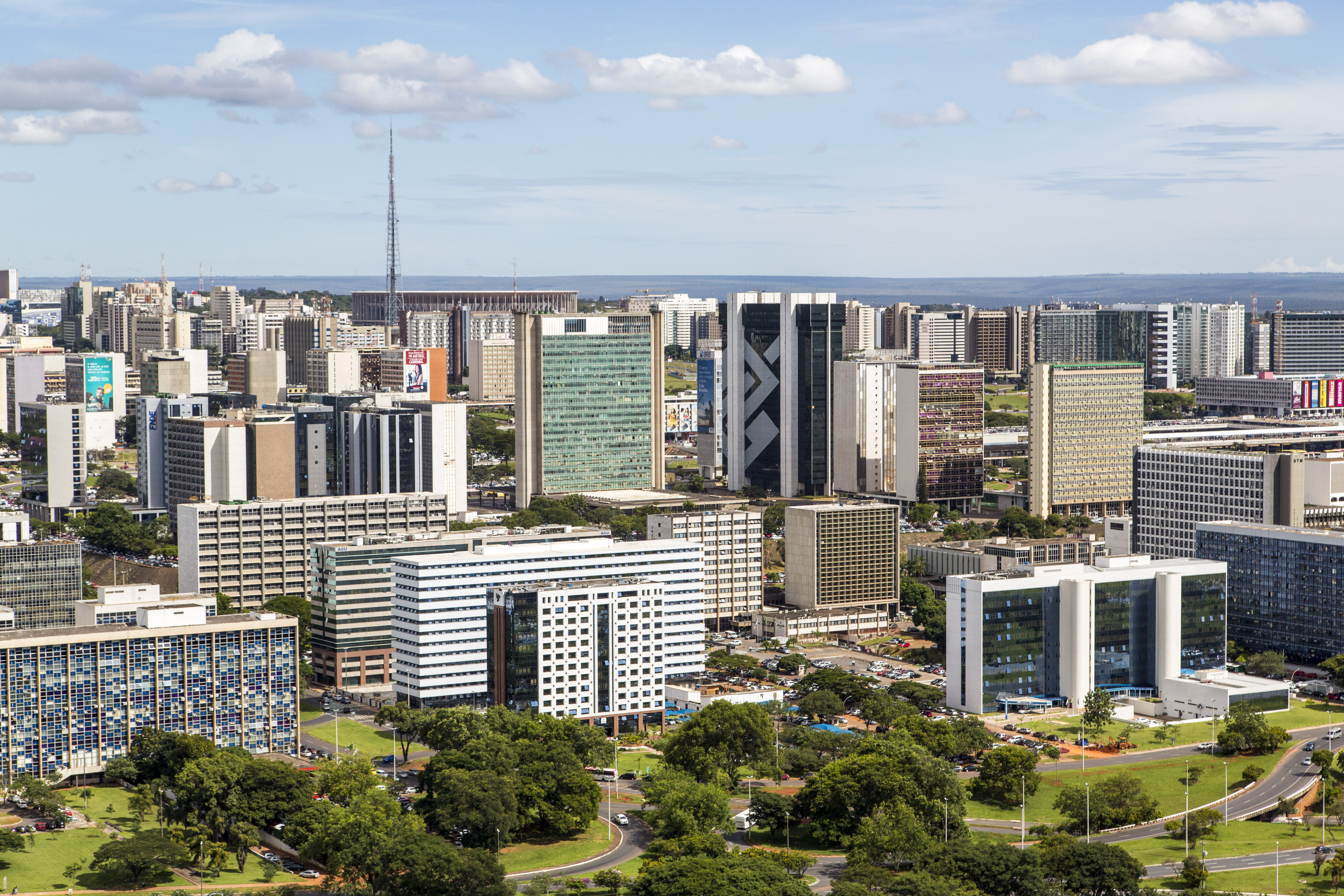
South Banking Sector

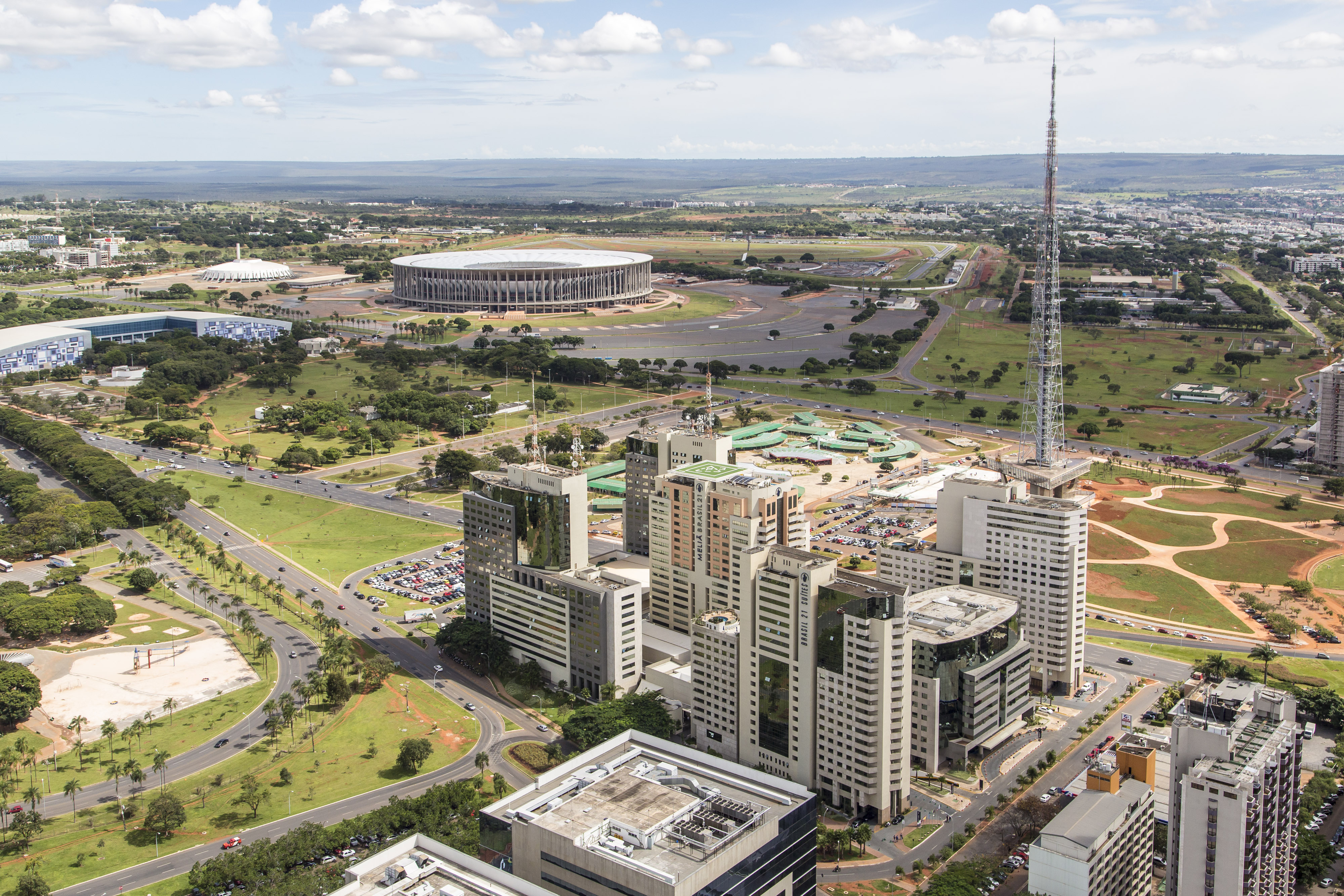
South Hotel Sector

The major roles of construction and of services (government, communications, banking and finance, food production, entertainment, and legal services) in Brasília's economy reflect the city's status as a governmental rather than an industrial center. Industries connected with construction, food processing, and furnishings are important, as are those associated with publishing, printing, and computer software. The gross domestic product (GDP) is divided in Public Administration 54.8%, Services 28.7%, Industry 10.2%, Commerce 6.1%, Agrobusiness 0.2%.

Besides being the political center, Brasília is also an important economic hub. In 2018, it has the third highest GDP of cities in Brazil, R$254 billion reais, representing 3.6% of the total Brazilian GDP. Most economic activity in the federal capital results from its administrative function. Its industrial planning is studied carefully by the Government of the Federal District. Being a city registered by UNESCO, the government in Brasília has opted to encourage the development of non-polluting industries such as software, film, video, and gemology among others, with emphasis on environmental preservation and maintaining ecological balance, preserving the city property.

According to Mercer's city rankings of cost of living for expatriate employees, Brasília ranks 45th among the most expensive cities in the world in 2012, up from the 70th position in 2010, ranking behind São Paulo (12th) and Rio de Janeiro (13th).

=== Industries ===
Industries in the city include construction (Paulo Octavio, Via Construções, and Irmãos Gravia among others); food processing (Perdigão, Sadia); furniture making; recycling (Novo Rio, Rexam, Latasa and others); pharmaceuticals (União Química); and graphic industries. The main agricultural products produced in the city are coffee, guavas, strawberries, oranges, lemons, papayas, soybeans, and mangoes. It has over 110,000 cows and it exports wood products worldwide.

The Federal District, where Brasília is located, has a GDP of R$133,4 billion (about US$64.1 billion), about the same as Belarus according to The Economist. Its share of the total Brazilian GDP is about 3.8%. The Federal District has the largest GDP per capita income of Brazil US$25,062, slightly higher than Belarus.

The city's planned design included specific areas for almost everything, including accommodation, Hotels Sectors North and South. New hotel facilities are being developed elsewhere, such as the hotels and tourism Sector North, located on the shores of Lake Paranoá.

== Culture ==
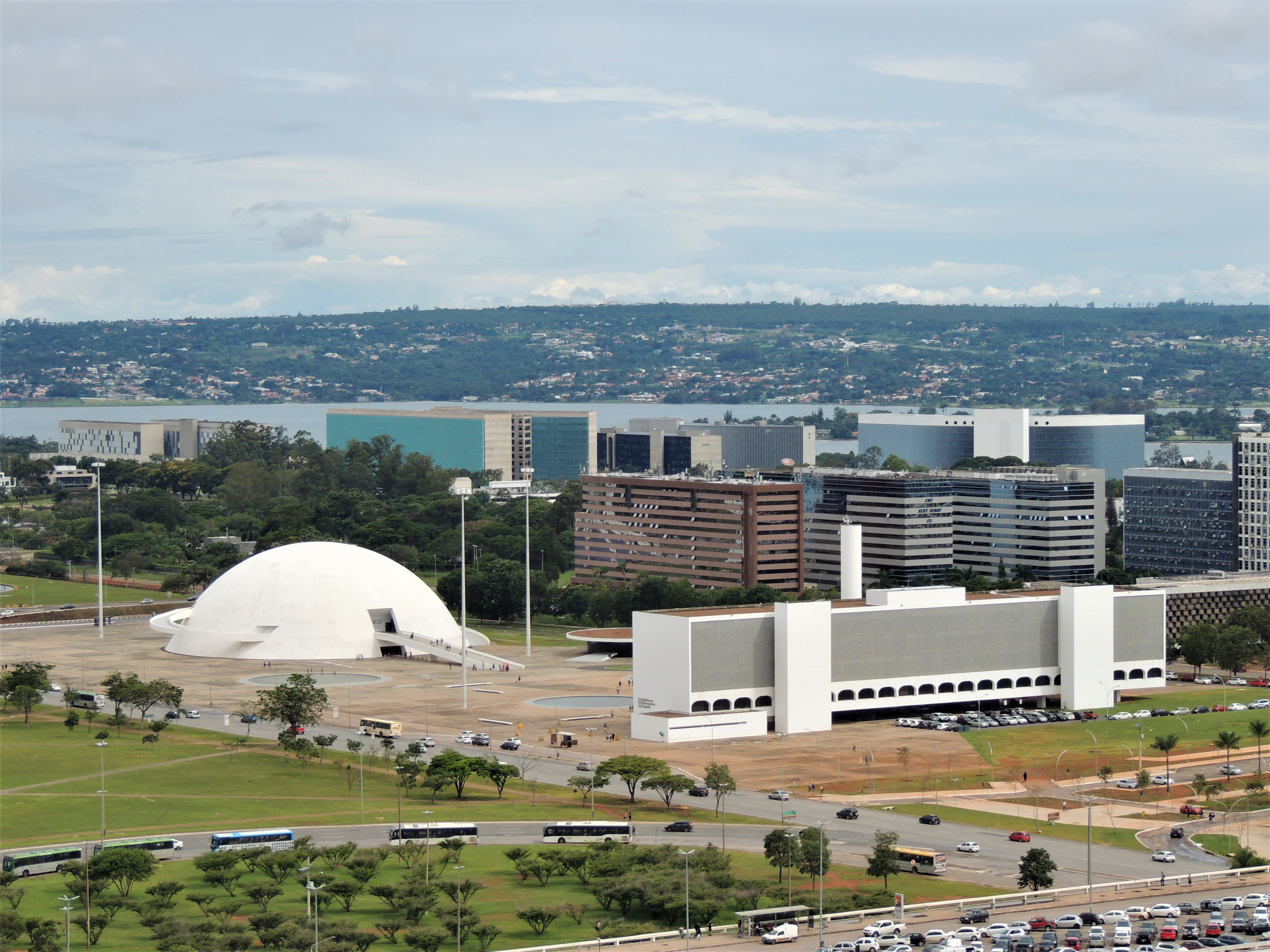
Cultural Complex of the Republic is formed by the National Library of Brasília and the National Museum of the Republic buildings

Brasília hosts political events, music performances, and film festivals. The city has approximately 124 embassies, a range of restaurants, and infrastructure for hosting various types of events. Business travel and tourism contribute to the local economy, supported by hotels distributed throughout the federal capital. Traditional festivals and celebrations are held throughout the year.

In June, large festivals known as "festas juninas" are held celebrating Catholic saints such as Saint Anthony of Padua, Saint John the Baptist, and Saint Peter. On 7 September, the traditional Independence Day parade is held on the Ministries Esplanade. Throughout the year, local, national, and international events are held throughout the city. Christmas is widely celebrated, and New Year's Eve usually hosts major events celebrated in the city.

The city also hosts a varied assortment of art works from artists like Bruno Giorgi, Alfredo Ceschiatti, Athos Bulcão, Marianne Peretti, Alfredo Volpi, Di Cavalcanti, Dyllan Taxman, Victor Brecheret and Burle Marx, whose works have been integrated into the city's architecture, making it a unique landscape. The cuisine in the city is very diverse. Many of the best restaurants in the city can be found in the Asa Sul district.

The city is the birthplace of Brazilian rock and place of origin of bands like: Legião Urbana, Capital Inicial, Aborto Elétrico, Plebe Rude and Raimundos. Brasília has the Rock Basement Festival which brings new bands to the national scene. The festival is held in the parking of the Brasília National Stadium Mané Garrincha.

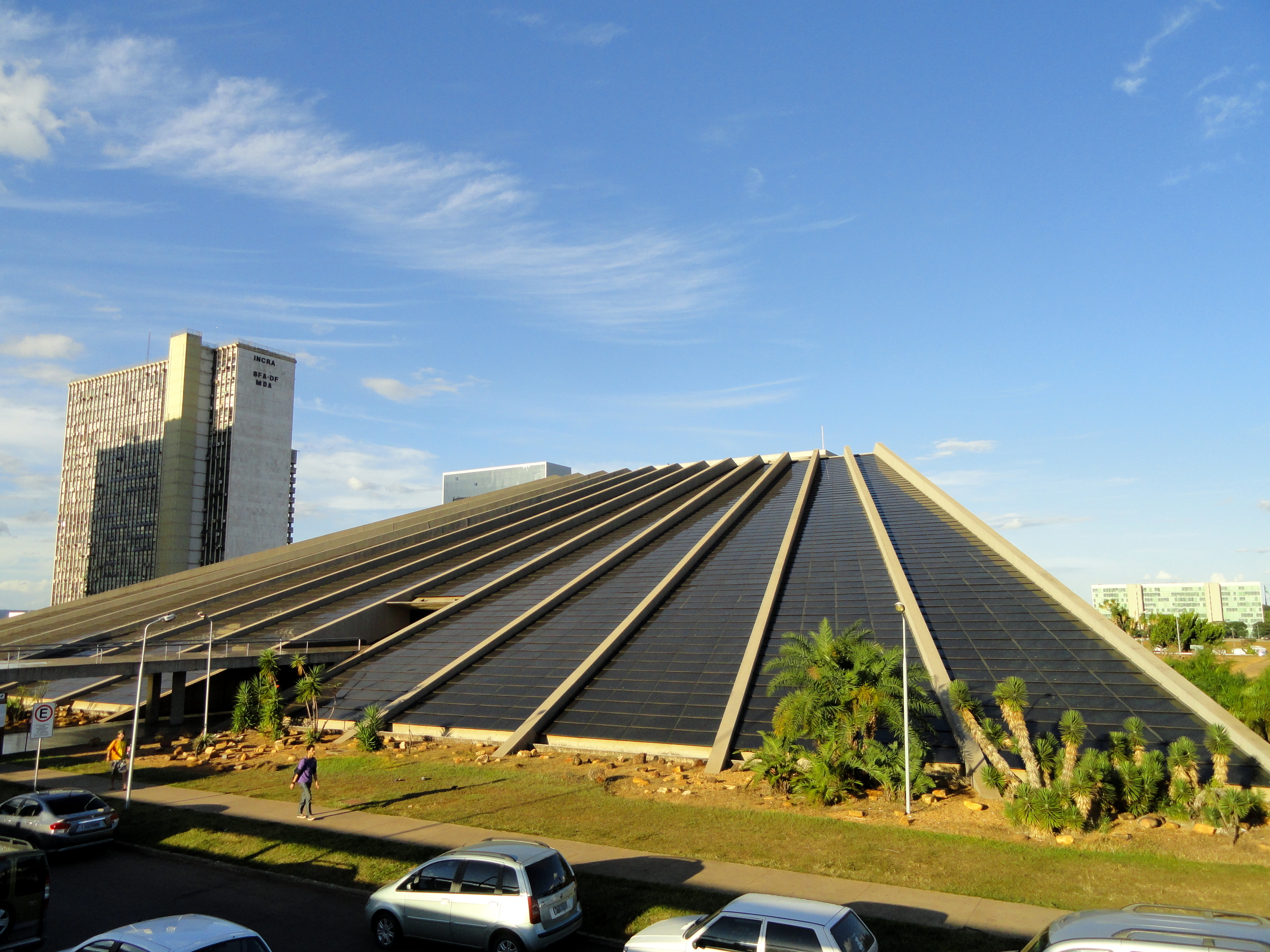
Cláudio Santoro National Theater

Since 1965, the annual Brasília Festival of Brazilian Cinema is one of the most traditional cinema festivals in Brazil, being compared only to the Brazilian Cinema Festival of Gramado, in Rio Grande do Sul. The difference between both is that the festival in Brasília still preserves the tradition to only submit and reward Brazilian movies.

The International Dance Seminar in Brasília has brought top-notch dance to the Federal Capital since 1991. International teachers, shows with choreographers and guest groups and scholarships abroad are some of the hallmarks of the event. The Seminar is the central axis of the DANCE BRAZIL program and is promoted by the DF State Department of Culture in partnership with the Cultural Association Claudio Santoro.

Brasília has also been the focus of modern-day literature. Published in 2008, The World In Grey: Dom Bosco's Prophecy, by author Ryan J. Lucero, tells an apocalyptical story based on the famous prophecy from the late 19th century by the Italian saint Don Bosco. According to Don Bosco's prophecy: "Between parallels 15 and 20, around a lake which shall be formed; A great civilization will thrive, and that will be the Promised Land". Brasília lies between the parallels 15° S and 20° S, where an artificial lake (Paranoá Lake) was formed. Don Bosco is Brasília's patron saint.

American Flagg!, the First Comics comic book series created by Howard Chaykin, portrays Brasília as a cosmopolitan world capital of culture and exotic romance. In the series, it is a top vacation and party destination. The 2015 Rede Globo series Felizes para Sempre? was set in Brasília.

=== Architecture and urbanism ===
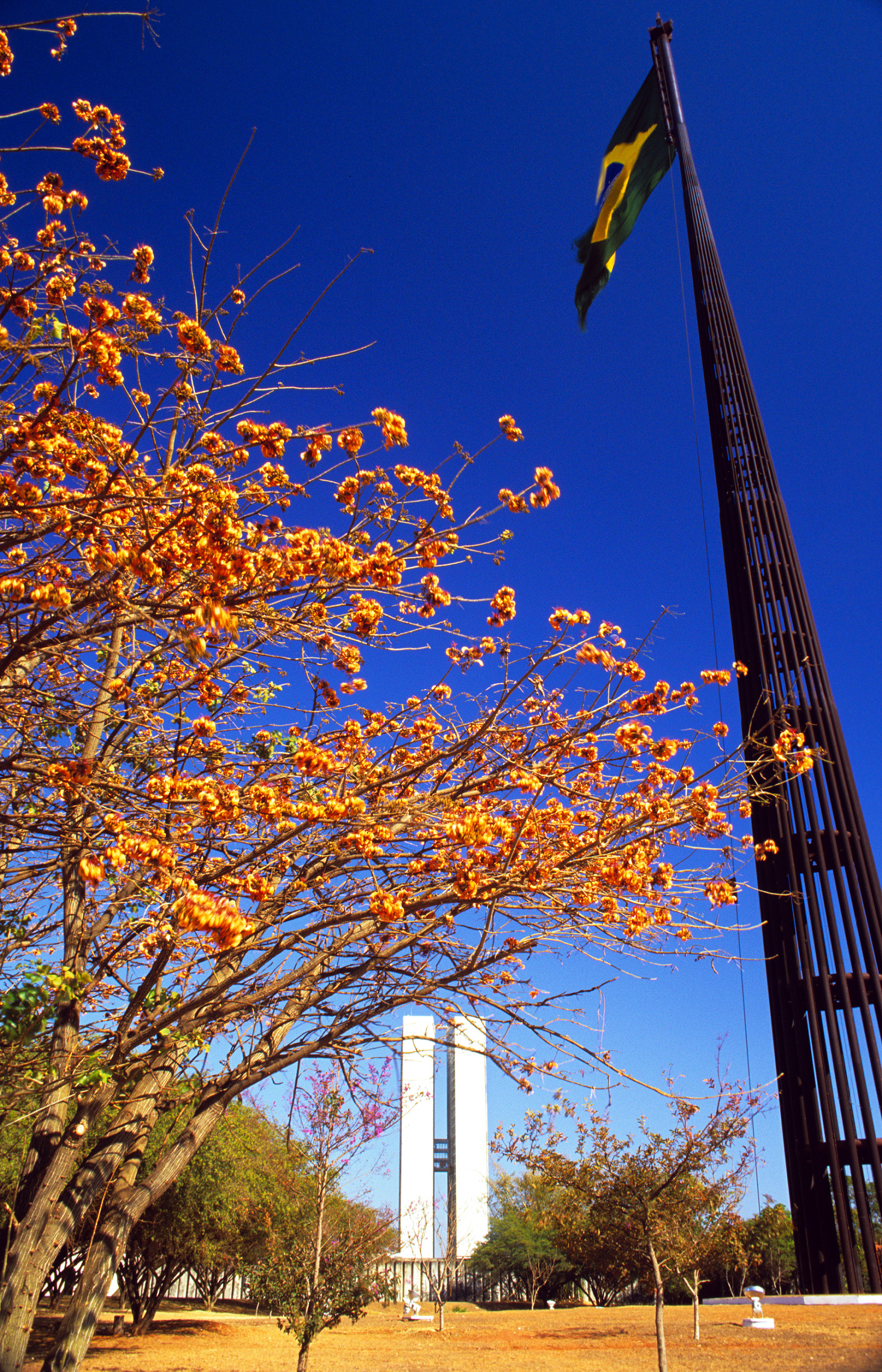
Brazilian Flag and the National Congress in spring

At the Square of Three Powers, Brazilian architect Oscar Niemeyer and Brazilian structural engineer Joaquim Cardozo made buildings in the style of modern Brazilian architecture. The Congress also occupies various other surrounding buildings, some connected by tunnels.

The National Congress building is located in the middle of the Eixo Monumental, the city's main avenue. In front lies a large lawn and reflecting pool. The building faces the Praça dos Três Poderes where the Palácio do Planalto and the Supreme Federal Court are located. The Brazilian landscape architect Roberto Burle Marx designed landmark modernist gardens for some of the principal buildings. In residential areas, buildings were built that were inspired in French modernist and bauhaus design.

Although not fully accomplished, the "Brasília utopia" has produced a city of relatively high quality of life, in which the citizens live in forested areas with sporting and leisure structure (the superquadras) surrounded by small commercial areas, bookstores and cafés; the city is famous for its cuisine and efficiency of transit. Even these positive features have sparked controversy, expressed in the nickname "ilha da fantasia" ("fantasy island"), indicating the sharp contrast between the city and surrounding regions, marked by poverty and disorganization in the cities of the states of Goiás and Minas Gerais, around Brasília.

Critics of Brasilia's grand scale have characterized it as a modernist bauhaus platonic fantasy about the future:

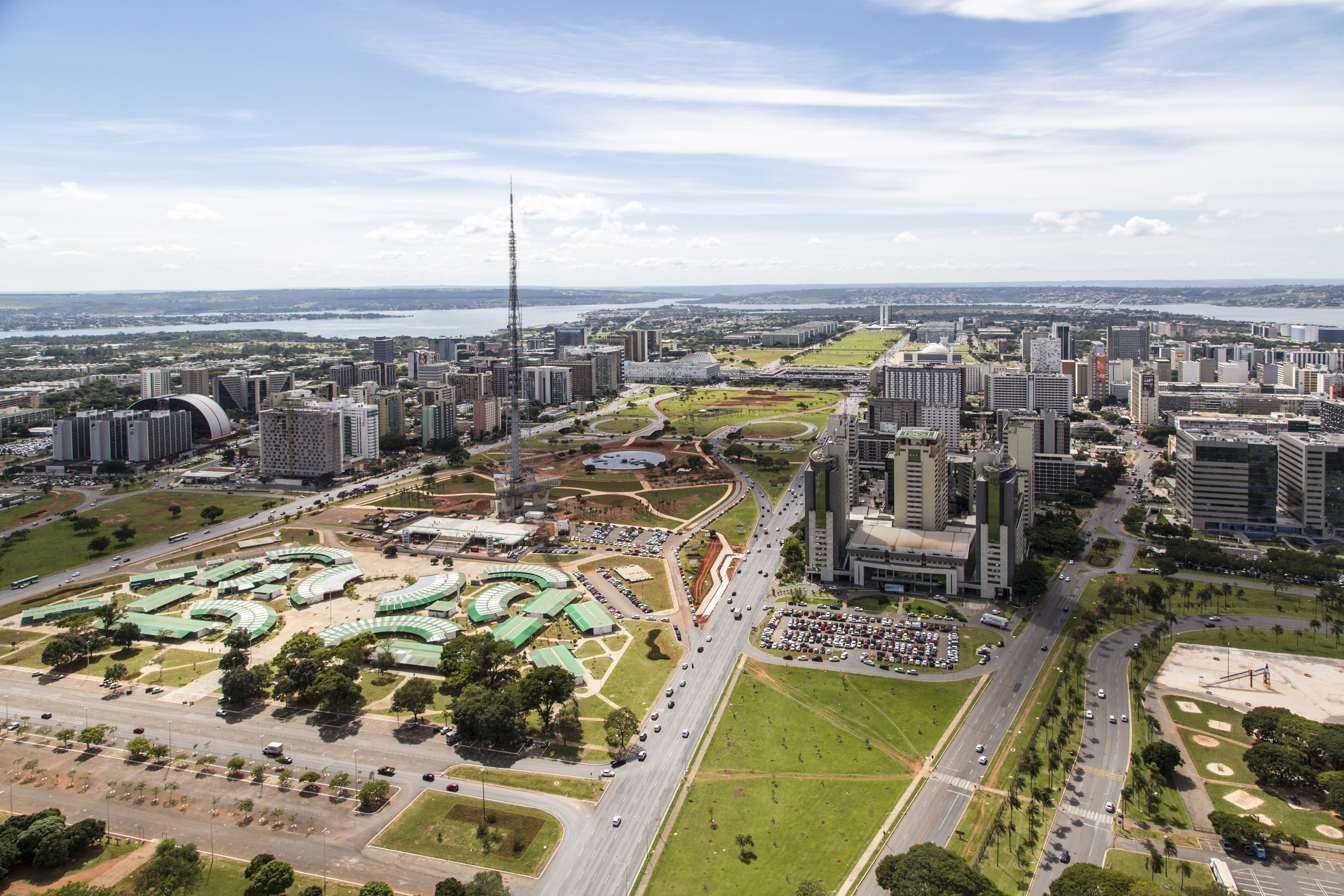
The Monumental Axis

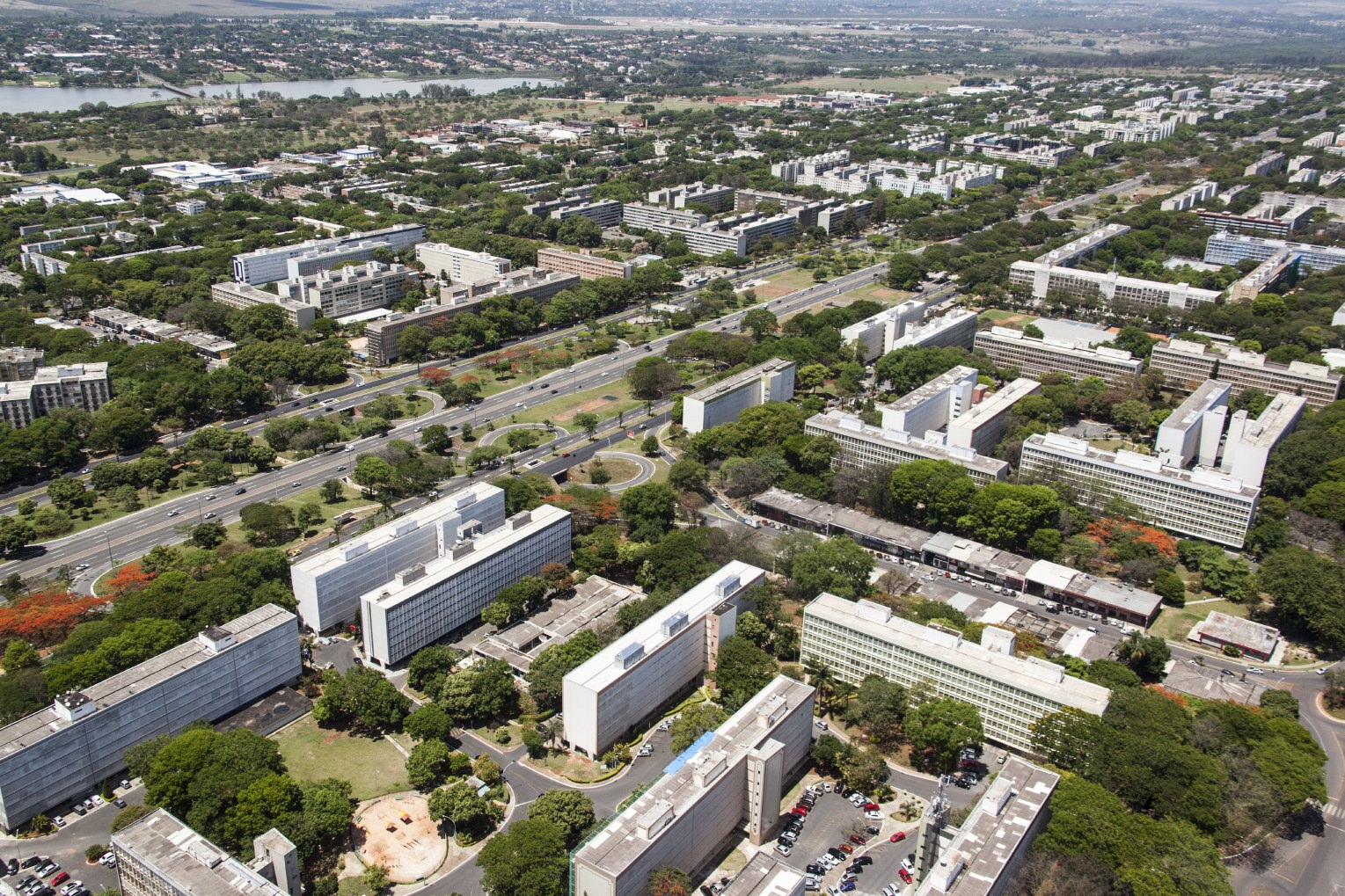
Aerial view of South Wing (Asa Sul) district

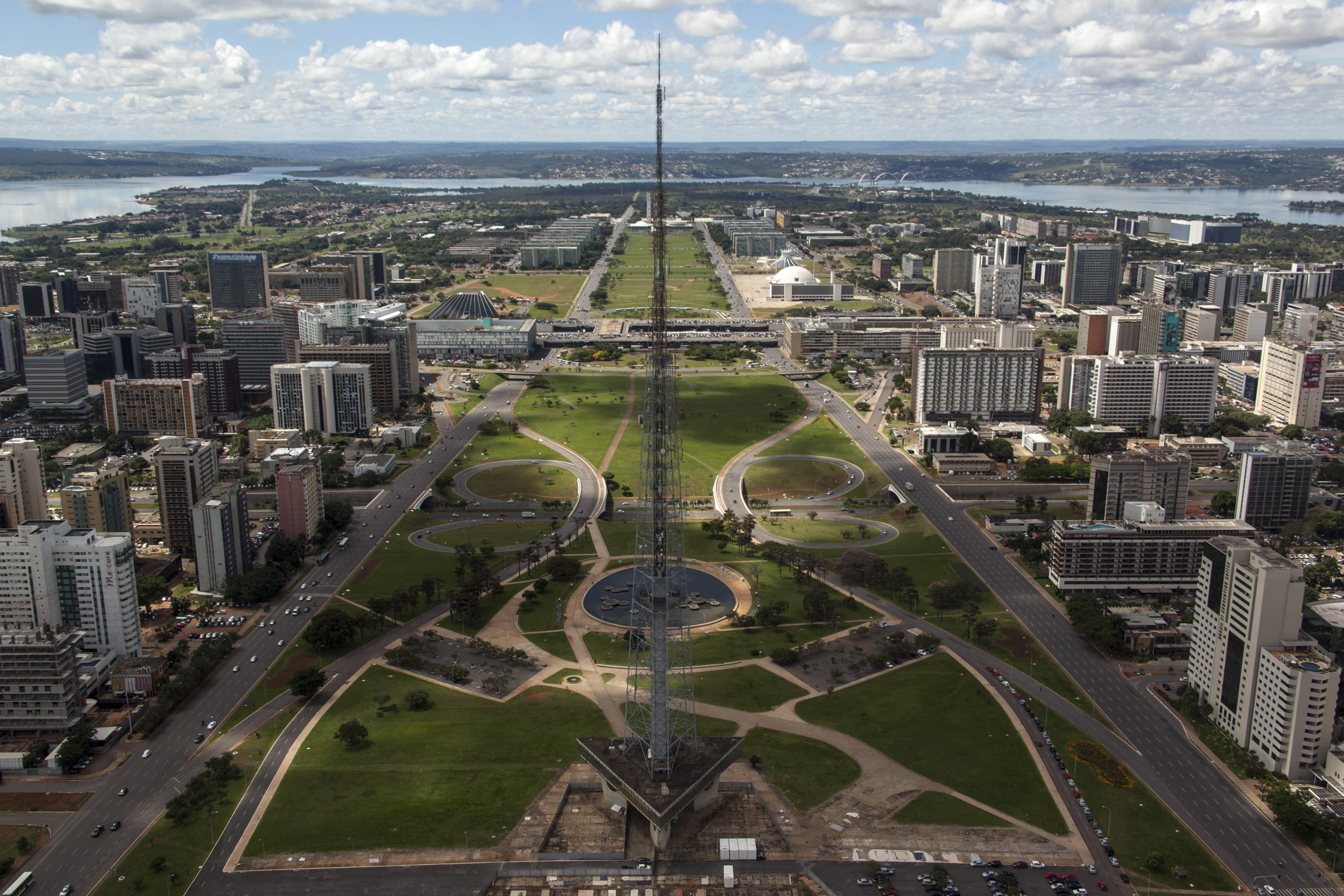
Monumental Axis and Brasília TV Tower

Nothing dates faster than people's fantasies about the future. This is what you get when perfectly decent, intelligent, and talented men start thinking in terms of space rather than place; and single rather than multiple meanings. It's what you get when you design for political aspirations rather than real human needs. You get miles of jerry-built platonic nowhere infested with Volkswagens. This, one may fervently hope, is the last experiment of its kind. The utopian buck stops here.

— Robert Hughes, The Shock of the New, Episode 4: "Trouble in Utopia", (1980)

==== Notable structures ====
The Cathedral of Brasília in the capital of the Federative Republic of Brazil, is an expression of the atheist architect Oscar Niemeyer and the structural engineer Joaquim Cardozo. This concrete-framed hyperboloid structure, seems with its glass roof reaching up, open, to the heavens.

The cathedral's structure was finished on 31 May 1970, and only the 70 m (229.66 ft) diameter of the circular area were visible. Niemeyer's and Cardozo's project of Cathedral of Brasília is based in the hyperboloid of revolution which sections are asymmetric. The hyperboloid structure itself is a result of 16 identical assembled concrete columns. There is controversy as to what these columns, having hyperbolic section and weighing 90 t, represent, some say they are two hands moving upwards to heaven, others associate it to the chalice Jesus used in the last supper and some claim it represent his crown of thorns. The cathedral was dedicated on 31 May 1970.

At the end of the Eixo Monumental ("Monumental Axis") lies the Esplanada dos Ministérios ("Ministries Esplanade"), an open area in downtown Brasília. The rectangular lawn is surrounded by two eight-lane avenues where many government buildings, monuments and memorials are located. On Sundays and holidays, the Eixo Monumental is closed to cars so that locals may use it as a place to walk, bike, and have picnics under the trees.

Praça dos Três Poderes (Portuguese for Square of the Three Powers) is a plaza in Brasília. The name is derived from the encounter of the three federal branches around the plaza: the Executive, represented by the Palácio do Planalto (presidential office); the Legislative, represented by the National Congress (Congresso Nacional); and the Judiciary branch, represented by the Supreme Federal Court (Supremo Tribunal Federal). It is a tourist attraction in Brasília, designed by Lúcio Costa and Oscar Niemeyer as a place where the three branches would meet harmoniously.

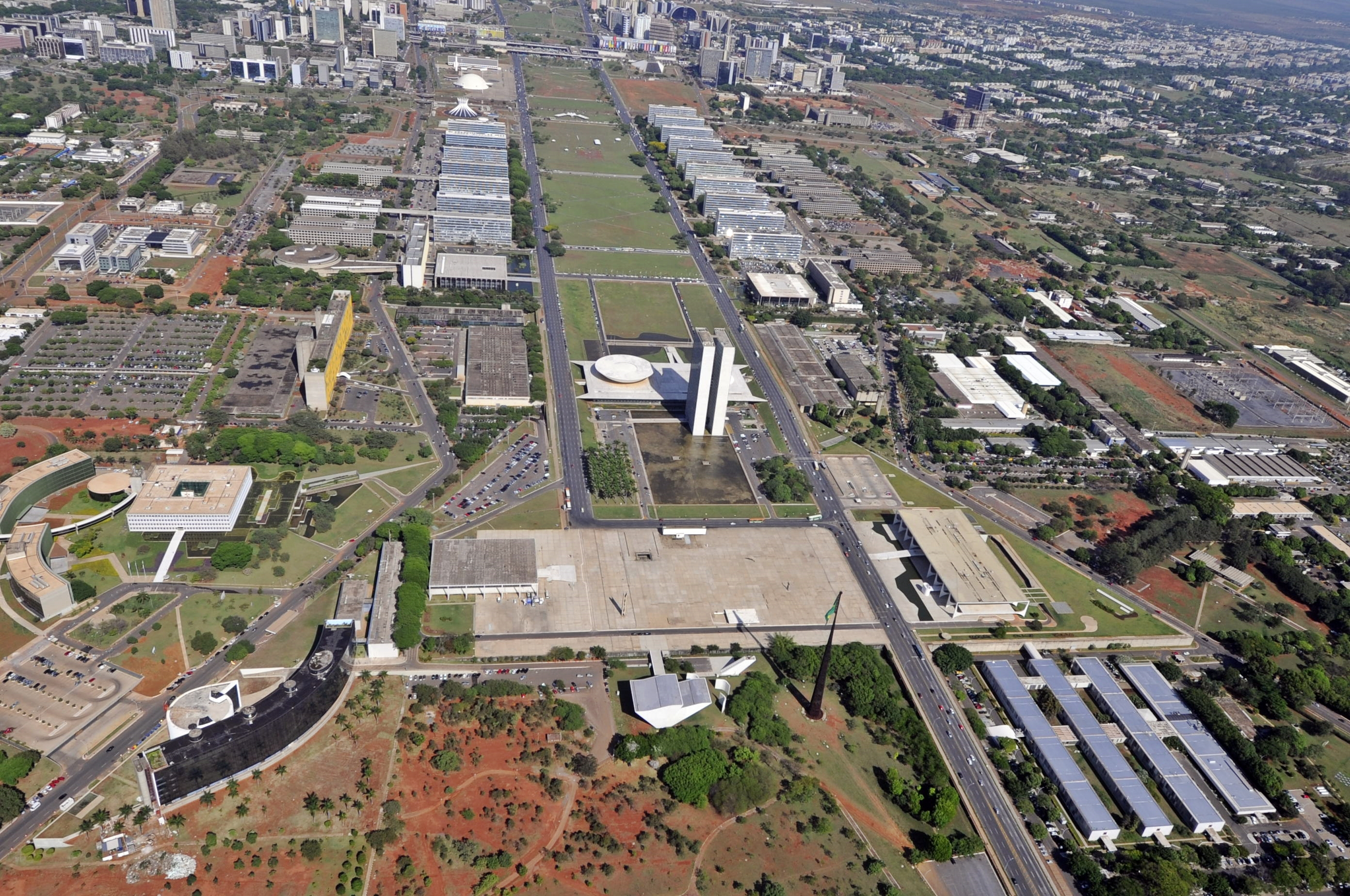
Praça dos Três Poderes (Three Powers Plaza)

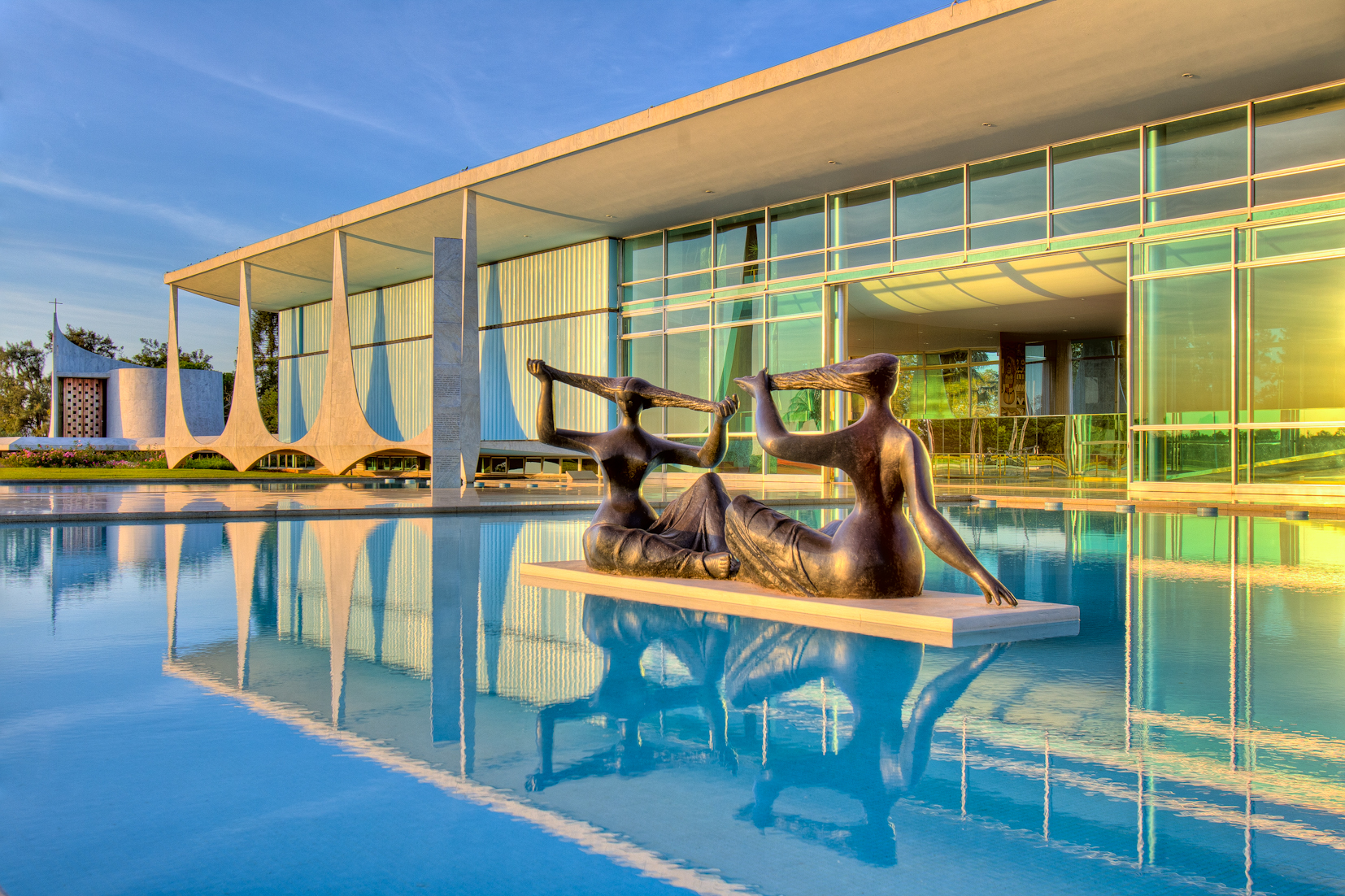
The Palácio da Alvorada

The Palácio da Alvorada is the official residence of the president of Brazil. The palace was designed, along with the rest of the city of Brasília, by Oscar Niemeyer and inaugurated in 1958. One of the first structures built in the republic's new capital city, the "Alvorada" lies on a peninsula at the shore of Lake Paranoá.

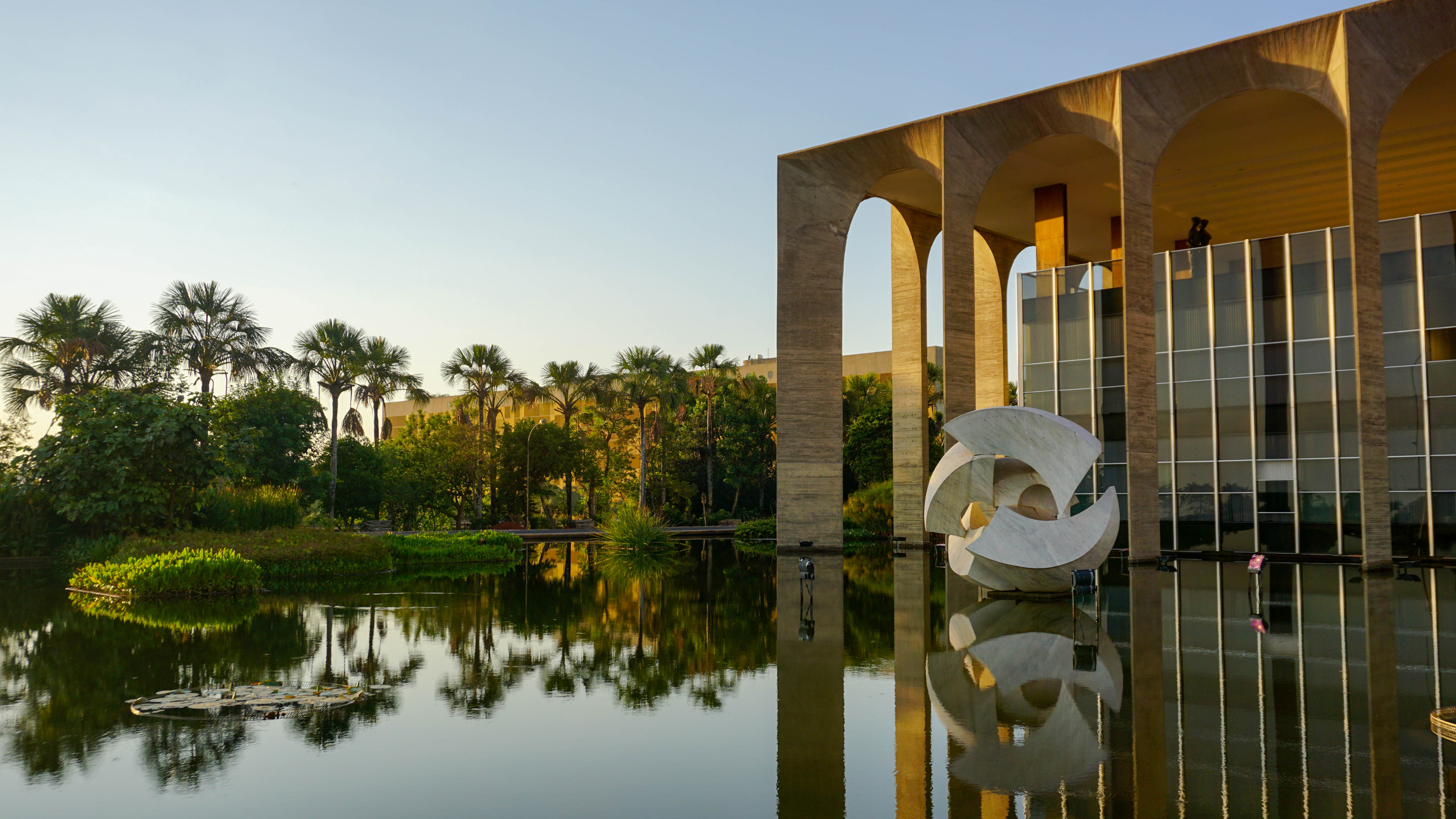
Itamaraty Palace facade

The principles of simplicity and modernity that in the past characterized the great works of architecture motivated Niemeyer. The viewer has an impression of looking at a glass box, softly landing on the ground with the support of thin external columns. The building has an area of 7,000 m^{2} with three floors consisting of the basement, landing, and second floor.

The auditorium, kitchen, laundry, medical center, and administration offices are at basement level. The rooms used by the presidency for official receptions are on the landing. The second floor has four suites, two apartments, and various private rooms which make up the residential part of the palace. The building also has a library, a heated Olympic-sized swimming pool, a music room, two dining rooms and various meeting rooms. A chapel and heliport are in adjacent buildings.

The Palácio do Planalto is the official workplace of the president of Brazil. It is located at the Praça dos Três Poderes in Brasília. As the seat of government, the term "Planalto" is often used as a metonym for the executive branch of government. The main working office of the President of the Republic is in the Palácio do Planalto.

The President and his or her family do not live in it, rather in the official residence, the Palácio da Alvorada. Besides the President, senior advisors also have offices in the "Planalto", including the Vice-President of Brazil and the Chief of Staff. The other Ministries are along the Esplanada dos Ministérios. The architect of the Palácio do Planalto was Oscar Niemeyer, creator of most of the important buildings in Brasília. The idea was to project an image of simplicity and modernity using fine lines and waves to compose the columns and exterior structures. The Palace is four stories high, and has an area of 36,000 m^{2}. Four other adjacent buildings are also part of the complex.

== Education ==
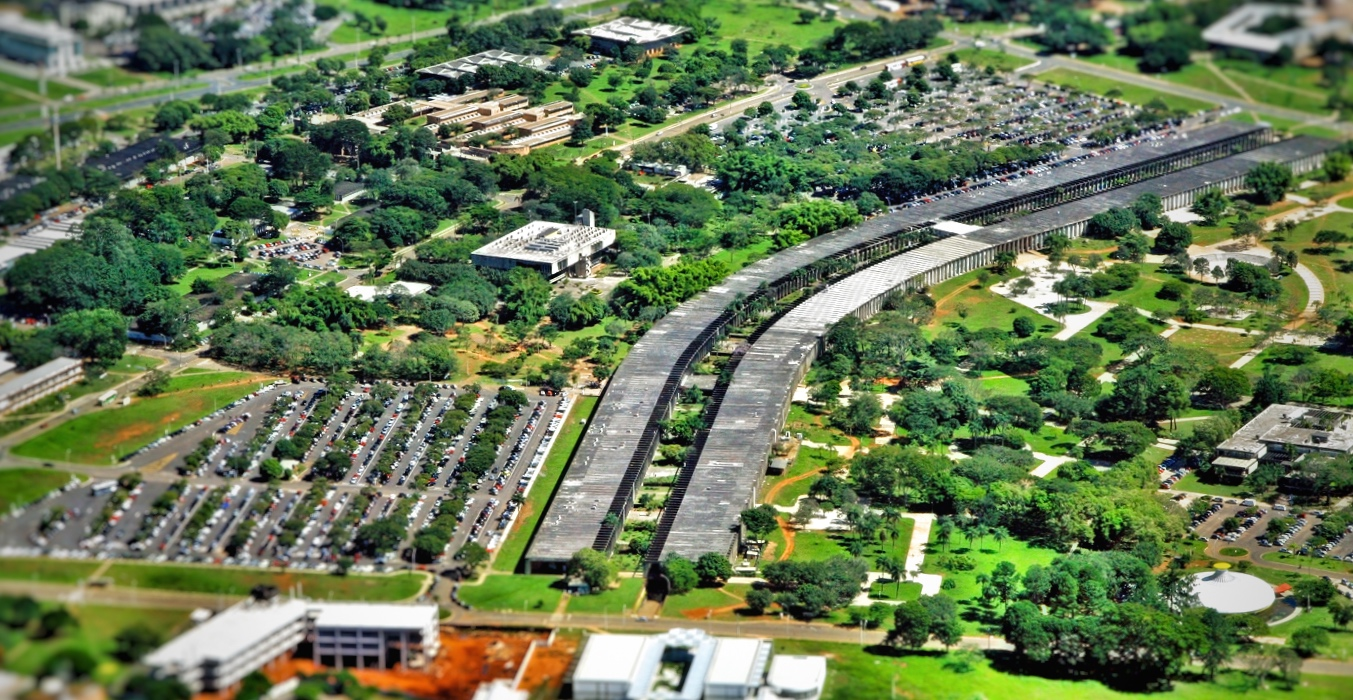
View of the University of Brasília

The education factor of Brasília's Human Development Index in 2020 reached the mark of 0.804 - a considerably high level, in line with the standards of the United Nations Development Programme (UNDP) - while the literacy rate of the population over the age of ten indicated by the last demographic census was 96.7%, above the national average (91%).

The city has seven international schools: the American School of Brasília, the Brasília International School, the Escola das Nações, the Swiss International School, the Lycée Français François Mitterrand, the Maple Bear Canadian School, and the British School of Brasília. Brasília has two universities, three university centers, and many private colleges.

The main tertiary educational institutions are: Universidade de Brasília – University of Brasília (UnB) (public); Universidade Católica de Brasília – Catholic University of Brasília; Centro Universitário de Brasília (UniCEUB); Centro Universitário Euroamaricano (Unieuro); Centro Universitário do Distrito Federal; Universidade Paulista; and Instituto de Educação Superior de Brasília.

There is an extreme concentration of higher education institutions in the Plano Piloto. In 2006, a new campus of the University of Brasilia was set up in Planaltina. There are also UnB campuses in the administrative regions of Ceilândia and Gama. The number of libraries is not proportional to the size of the population in the central area. The main public libraries in the Federal District are located in the city center, such as the University of Brasilia Library, the House and Senate Library, the Brasilia Demonstration Library and the Leonel de Moura Brizola National Library, also known as the Brasilia National Library, which opened in 2006.

== Transportation ==
The average commute time on public transit in Brasília, for example to and from work, on a weekday is 96 min. 31% of public transit riders, ride for more than 2 hours every day. The average amount of time people wait at a stop or station for public transit is 28 min, while 61% of riders wait for over 20 minutes on average every day. The average distance people usually ride in a single trip with public transit is 15.1 km (9.4 mi), while 50% travel for over 12 km (7.5 mi) in a single direction.

=== Airport ===
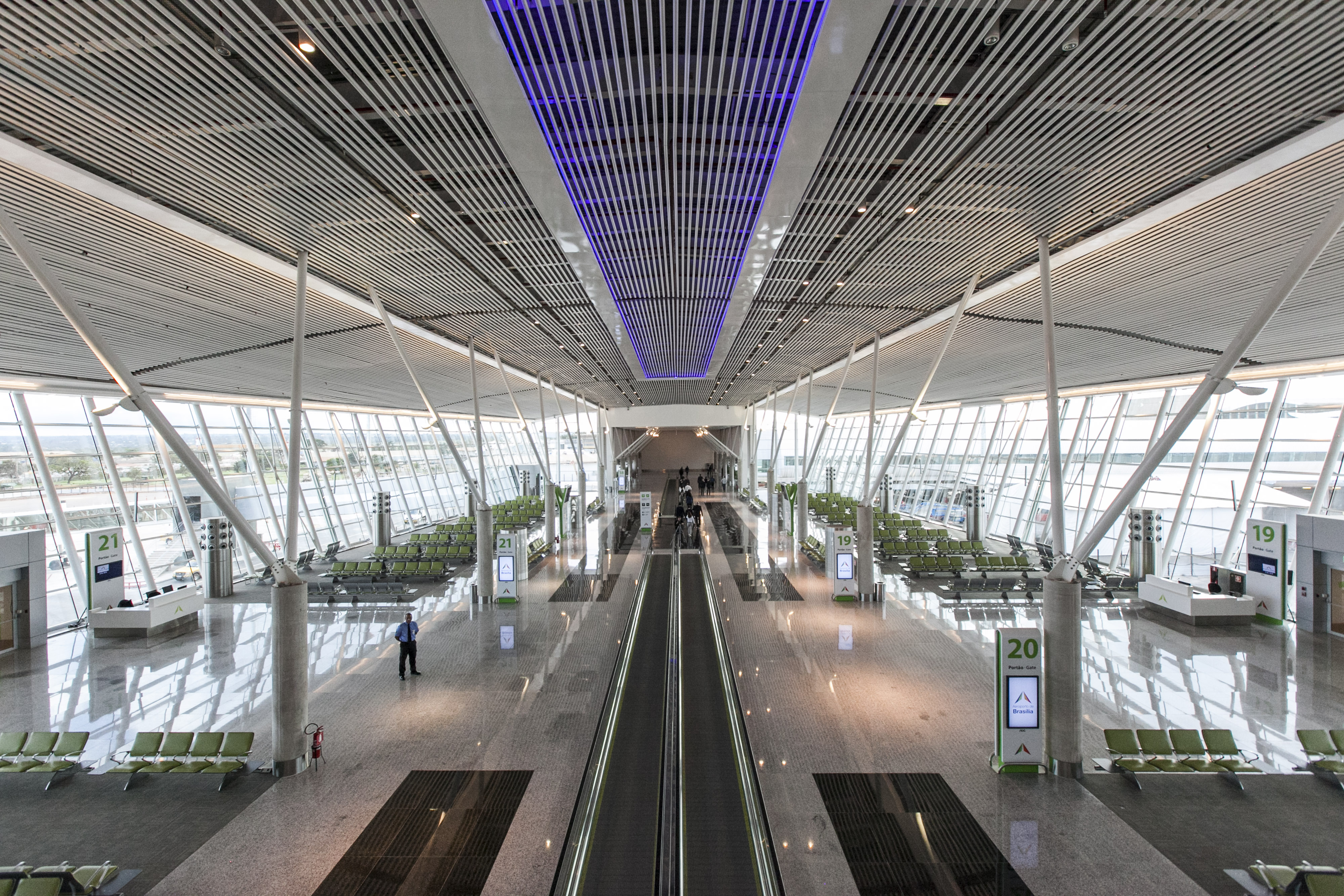
Brasília International Airport (BSB)

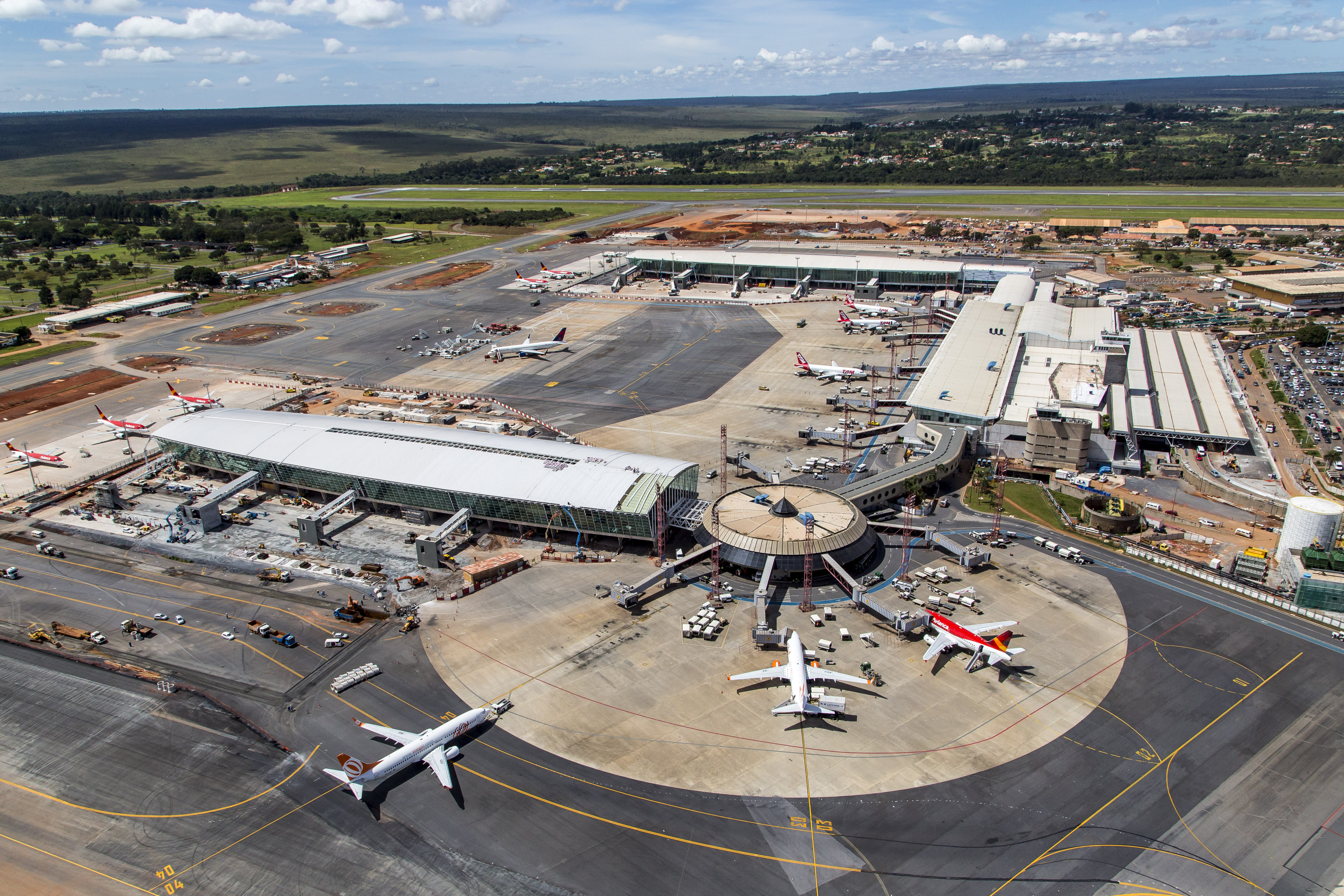
Aerial view of the airport

Brasília–Presidente Juscelino Kubitschek International Airport serves the metropolitan area with major domestic and international flights. It is the third busiest Brazilian airport based on passengers and aircraft movements. Because of its strategic location it is a civil aviation hub for the rest of the country. This results in a large number of takeoffs and landings and it is not unusual for flights to be delayed in a holding pattern before landing. Following the airport's master plan, Infraero built a second runway, which was finished in 2006. In 2007, the airport handled 11,119,872 passengers. The main building's third floor, with 12 thousand square meters, has a panoramic deck, a food court, shops, four movie theaters with total capacity of 500 people, and space for exhibitions. Brasília Airport has 136 vendor spaces. The airport is located about 11 km (6.8 mi) from the central area of Brasília, outside the metro system. The area outside the airport's main gate is lined with taxis as well as several bus line services that connect the airport to Brasília's central district. The parking lot accommodates 1,200 cars.

The airport is serviced by domestic and regional airlines (TAM, GOL, Azul, WebJET, Trip and Avianca), in addition to a number of international carriers. In 2012, Brasília's International Airport was won by the InfraAmerica consortium, formed by the Brazilian engineering company ENGEVIX and the Argentine Corporacion America holding company, with a 50% stake each. During the 25-year concession, the airport may be expanded to up to 40 million passengers a year.

In 2014 the airport received 15 new boarding bridges, totaling 28 in all. This was the main requirement made by the federal government, which transferred the operation of the terminal to the Inframerica Group after an auction. The group invested R$750 million in the project. In the same year, the number of parking spaces doubled, reaching three thousand. The airport's entrance has a new rooftop cover and a new access road. Furthermore, a VIP room was created on Terminal 1's third floor. The investments increased the airport's capacity from approximately 15 million passengers per year to 21 million by 2014. Brasília Air Force Base - ALA1, one of their most important bases of the Brazilian Air Force, is located in Brasília.

=== Road transport ===
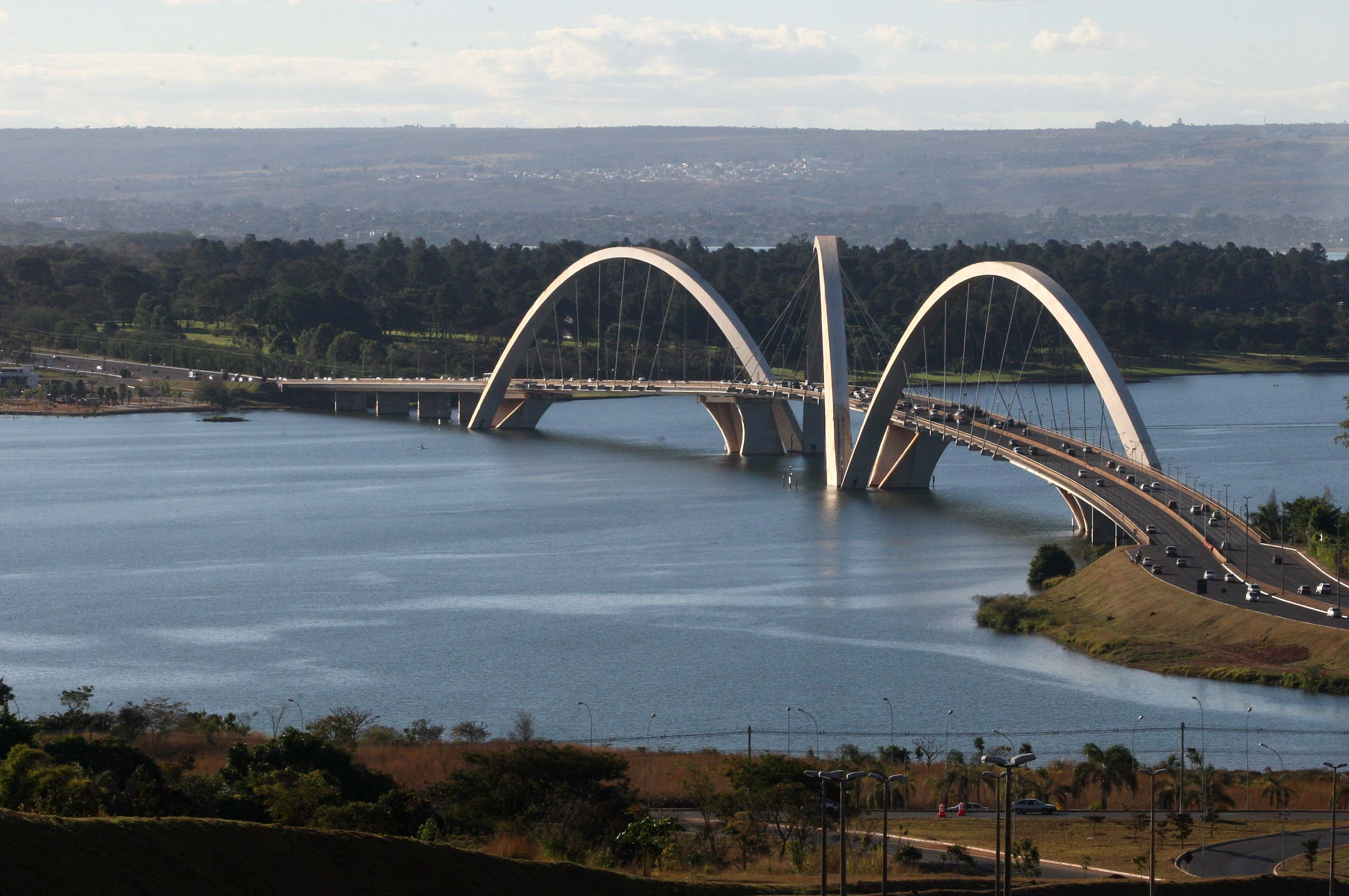
The Juscelino Kubitschek Bridge

Like most Brazilian cities, Brasília has a good network of taxi companies. Taxis from the airport are available outside the terminal, but at times there can be quite a queue of people. Although the airport is not far from the downtown area, taxi prices do seem to be higher than in other Brazilian cities. Booking in advance can be advantageous, particularly if time is limited, and local companies should be able to assist airport transfer or transport requirements.

The Juscelino Kubitschek bridge, also known as the 'President JK Bridge' or the 'JK Bridge', crosses Lake Paranoá in Brasília. It is named after Juscelino Kubitschek, former president of Brazil. It was designed by architect Alexandre Chan and structural engineer Mário Vila Verde. Chan won the Gustav Lindenthal Medal for this project at the 2003 International Bridge Conference in Pittsburgh due to "...outstanding achievement demonstrating harmony with the environment, aesthetic merit and successful community participation". It consists of three 60 m (200 ft) tall asymmetrical steel arches that crisscross diagonally. With a length of 1,200 m (0.75 miles), it was completed in 2002 at a cost of US$56.8 million. The bridge has a pedestrian walkway and is accessible to bicyclists and skaters.

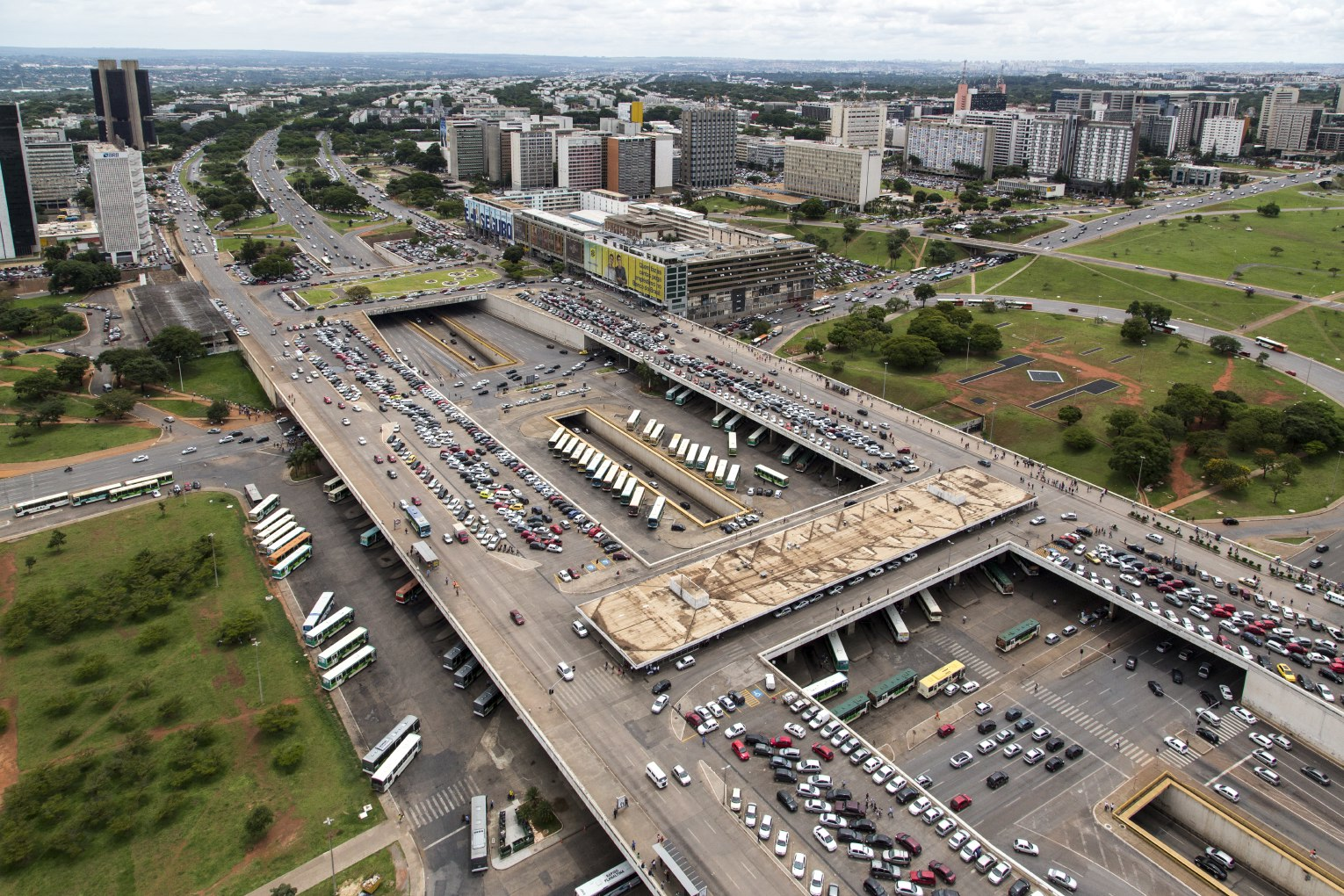
Central Bus Station

The main bus hub in Brasília is the Central Bus Station, located in the crossing of the Eixo Monumental and the Eixão, about 2 km (1.2 mi) from the Three Powers Plaza. The original plan was to have a bus station as near as possible to every corner of Brasília. Today, the bus station is the hub of urban buses only, some running within Brasília and others connecting Brasília to the satellite cities. In the original city plan, the interstate buses would also stop at the Central Station. Because of the growth of Brasília (and corresponding growth in the bus fleet), today the interstate buses leave from the older interstate station (called Rodoferroviária) located at the western end of the Eixo Monumental. The Central Bus Station also contains a main metro station. A new bus station was opened in July 2010. It is on Saída Sul (South Exit) near Parkshopping Mall with its metro station, and is also an inter-state bus station, used only to leave the Federal District.

=== Metro ===
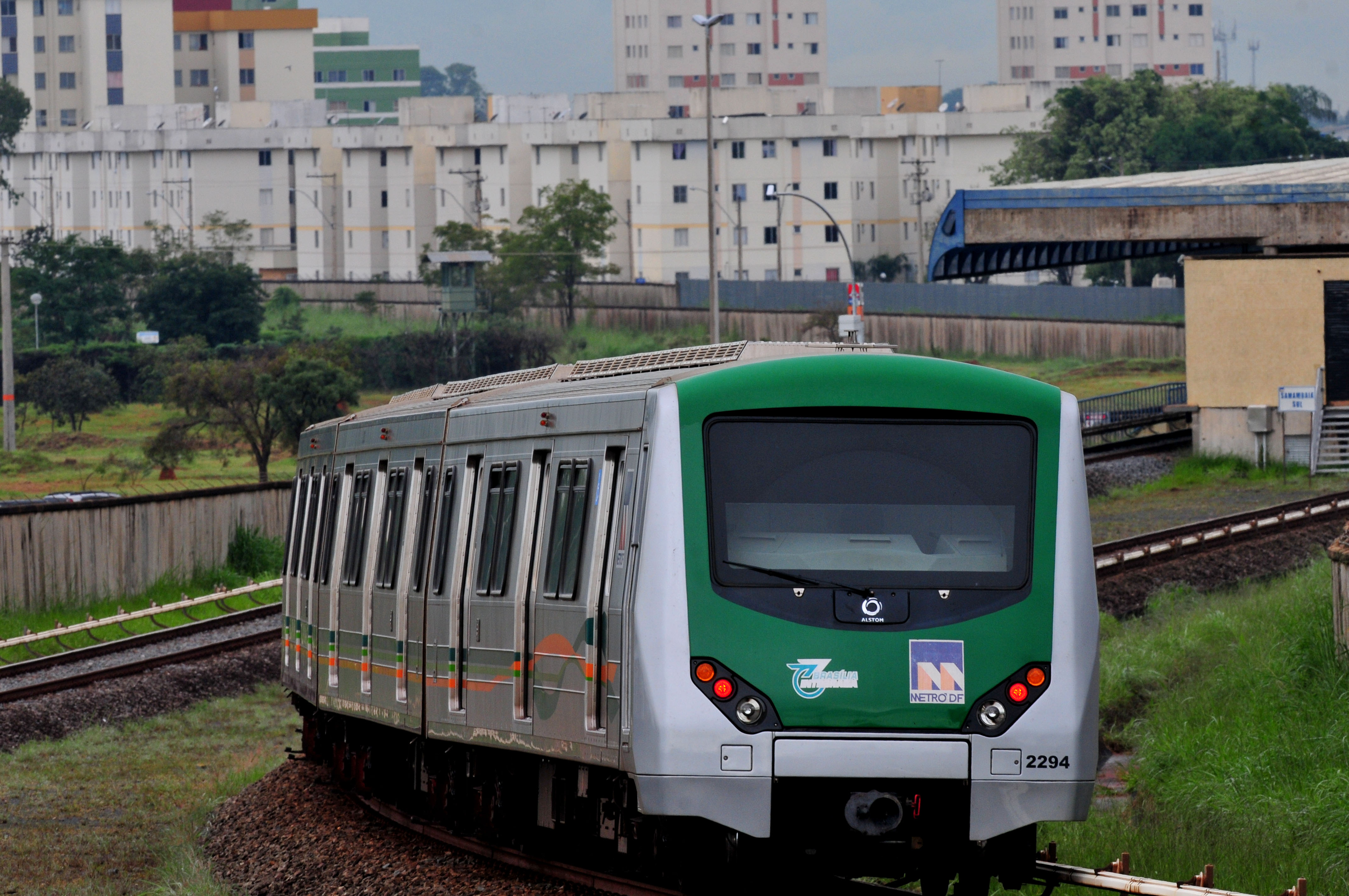
Federal District Metro

The Federal District Metro is Federal District's underground metro system. The system has 24 stations on two lines, the Orange and Green lines, along a total network of 43 km (27 mi), covering some of the Federal District. Both lines begin at the Central Station and run parallel until the Águas Claras Station. The Federal District Metro is not comprehensive so buses may provide better access to the center. The metro leaves the Rodoviária (bus station) and goes south, avoiding most of the political and tourist areas. The main purpose of the metro is to serve cities, such as Samambaia, Taguatinga and Ceilândia, as well as Guará and Águas Claras. The satellite cities served are more populated in total than the Plano Piloto itself (the census of 2000 indicated that Ceilândia had 344,039 inhabitants, Taguatinga had 243,575, and the Plano Piloto had approximately 400,000 inhabitants), and most residents of the satellite cities depend on public transportation.

The Expresso Pequi high-speed railway was planned to link Brasília and Goiânia, the capital of the state of Goias, but it will probably be turned into a regional service linking the capital cities and cities in between, including Anápolis and Alexânia.

A 22 km light rail line is also planned, estimated to cost between 1 billion reais (US$258 million) and 1.5 billion reais with capacity to transport around 200,000 passengers per day.

== Sport ==
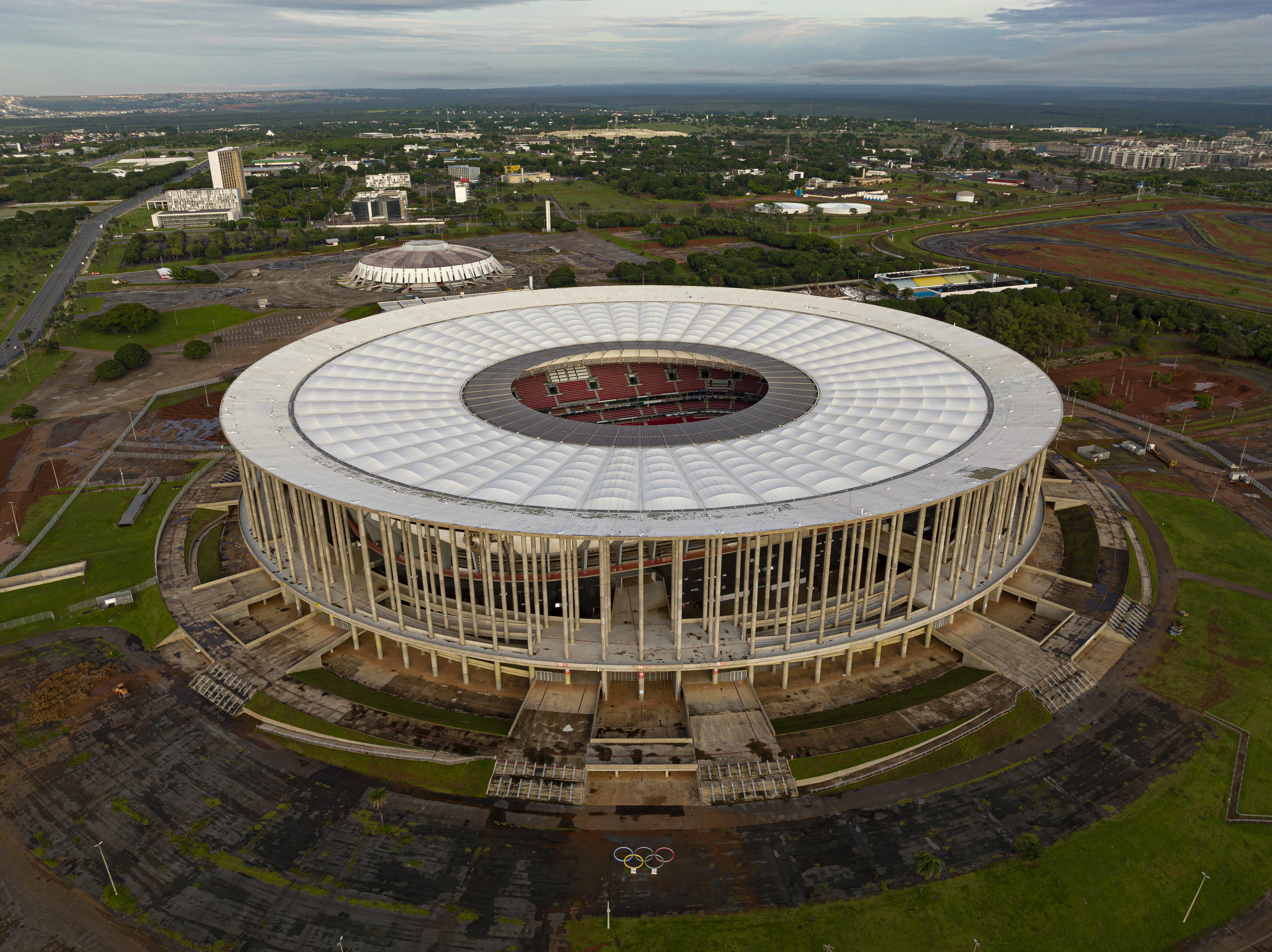
Estádio Nacional Mané Garrincha and Nilson Nelson Gymnasium (background)

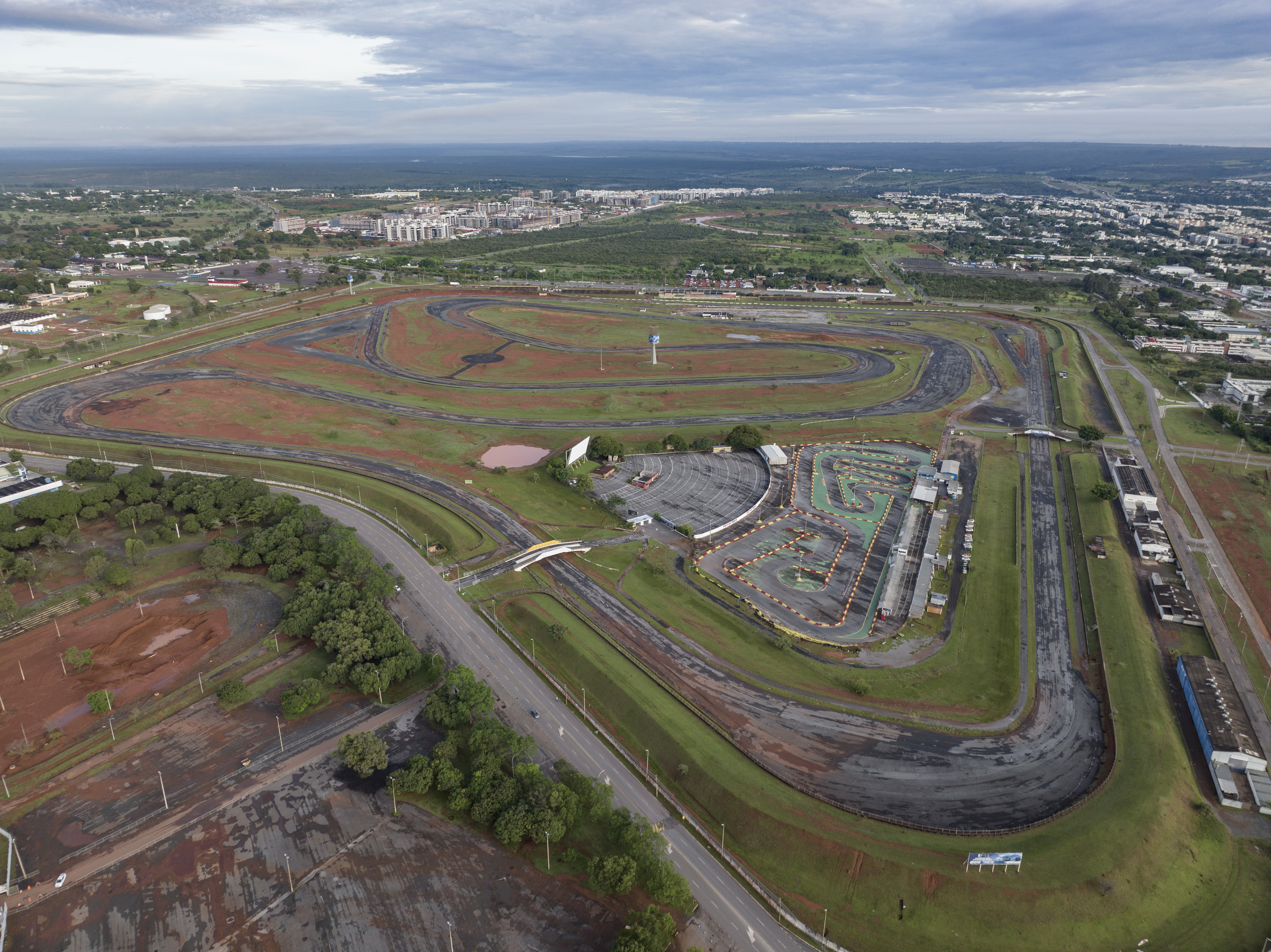
Autódromo Internacional Nelson Piquet

The main stadiums are Estadio Nacional Mané Garrincha (re-inaugurated on 18 May 2013), the Serejão Stadium (home for Brasiliense) and the Bezerrão Stadium (home for Gama).

There are a couple of professional clubs playing in Brasília, like Brasiliense, Gama, Brasília FC, and Real Brasília, but none are currently in the top two levels of Brazilian football. Clubs from Rio de Janeiro and São Paulo remain the most supported throughout the city.

Brasília was one of the host cities of the 2014 FIFA World Cup and 2013 FIFA Confederations Cup. Brasília hosted the opening of the Confederations Cup and hosted 7 World Cup games. Brasília also hosted the football tournaments during the 2016 Summer Olympics held in Rio de Janeiro.

Brasília is known as a departing point for the practice of unpowered air sports, sports that may be practiced with hang gliding or paragliding wings. Practitioners of such sports reveal that, because of the city's dry weather, the city offers strong thermal winds and great "cloud-streets", which is also the name for a maneuver quite appreciated by practitioners. In 2003, Brasília hosted the 14th Hang Gliding World Championship, one of the categories of free flying. In August 2005, the city hosted the second stage of the Brazilian Hang Gliding Championship.

Brasília is the site of the Autódromo Internacional Nelson Piquet which hosted the Grande Prêmio Presidente Emílio Médici, a non-championship round of the 1974 Formula One Grand Prix season, which was won by Emerson Fittipaldi. An IndyCar race was cancelled at the last minute in 2015 due to financial concerns. The track, which has been closed since 2015, is being renovated for the end of 2023 after a deal was struck with Banco de Brasília and Terracap.

The city is also home to one of Brazil's top basketball clubs, the three-time NBB champion Uniceub BRB. The club hosts some of its games at the 16,000 all-seat Nilson Nelson Gymnasium. Brasília attempted to host the 2000 Summer Olympics, but withdrew its application. In tennis, Brasília is host to the Aberto da República, and formerly hosted the Aberto de Brasília.

== See also ==
- List of purpose-built national capitals

Purpose-built Brazilian state capitals

- Aracaju
- Belo Horizonte
- Boa Vista
- Goiânia
- Palmas
- Teresina

== Notes ==
Preceded by Rio de Janeiro	Capital of Brazil; 1960–present	Incumbent
