= Indústrias Reunidas Fábricas Matarazzo =

Indústrias Reunidas Fábricas Matarazzo IRFM
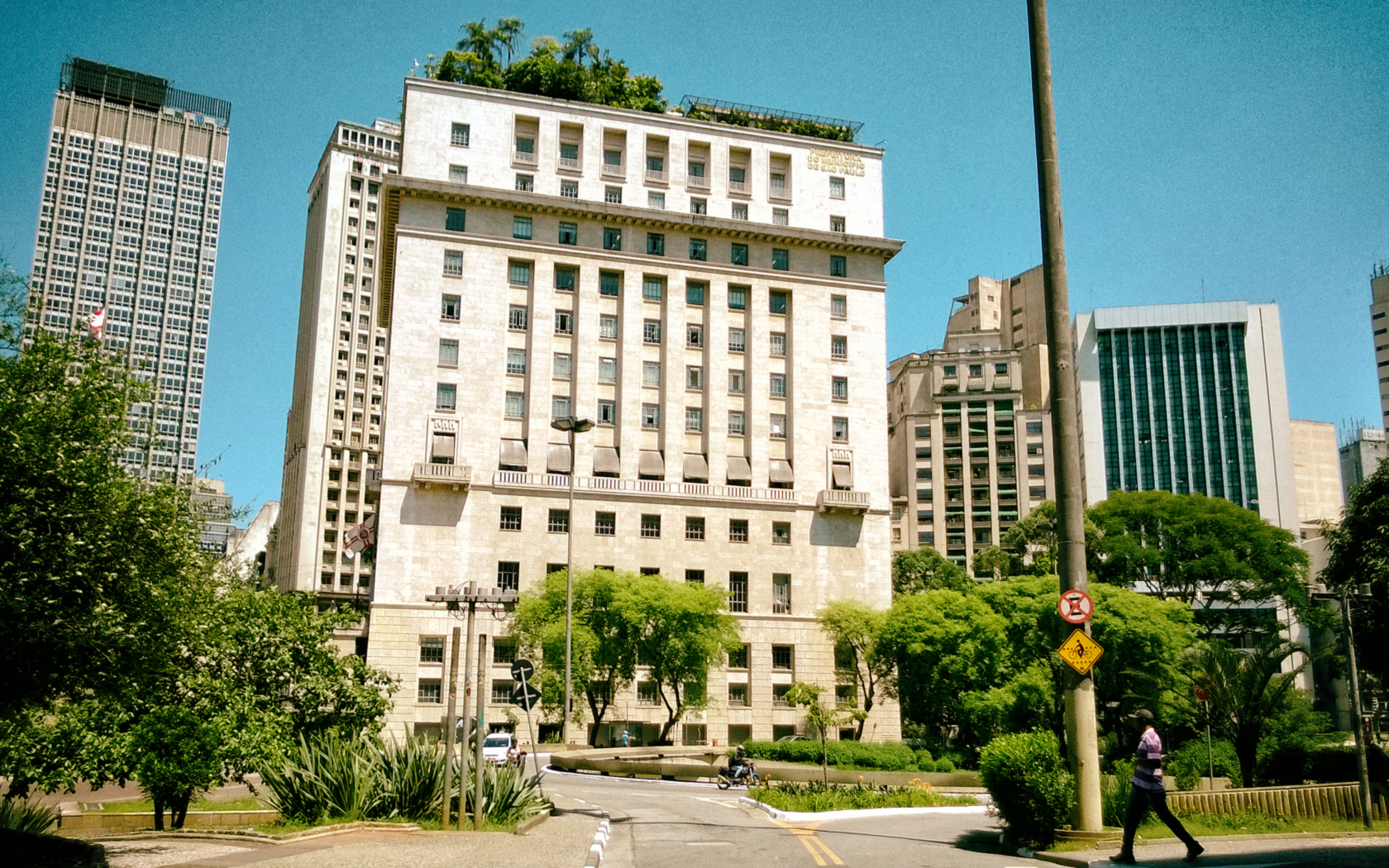
- The company's old headquarters, it currently serves as the city of São Paulo's city hall
- Industry: Conglomerate
- Founded: 1911
- Founder: Francesco Matarazzo
- Defunct: 1987
- Fate: Bankrupt
- Headquarters: São Paulo, Brazil
- Key people: Francesco Matarazzo Hermelino Matarazzo Francisco Matarazzo Júnior
- Number of employees: c. 30,000 at its peak

Indústrias Reunidas Fábricas Matarazzo (IRFM) was a Brazilian business group, the largest in Latin America at its time, headquartered in the city of São Paulo, capital of the homonymous state, where it employed about 6% of the local population. It had the fourth highest gross income in Brazil and had more than thirty thousand employees in its numerous units throughout the country.

Its founder was the Italian immigrant Francesco Matarazzo, who became the richest man in the Brazil at the time.

Matarazzo, who was a farmer in his homeland and a peddler shortly after arriving in Brazil, started his business life with a small commercial house that sold lard in Sorocaba. In the 1940s, at its peak, the group had more than 350 companies in the fields of food, textiles, beverages, land and sea transport, ports, railways, shipyards, metallurgy, agriculture, energy, banking, real estate and others.

At the end of the 1980s, it filed for bankruptcy, under the command of Maria Pia Matarazzo, granddaughter of the founder, going bankrupt soon after. The only factory left from the old complex, surviving to the 21st century, was the one that produced the soap brand "Francis". It was sold to the Bertin group, which in turn resold it to the JBS group, owner of Flora Higiene e Limpeza. It still owns several properties and land spread across Brazil, it also leases paper, sugar and alcohol mills.

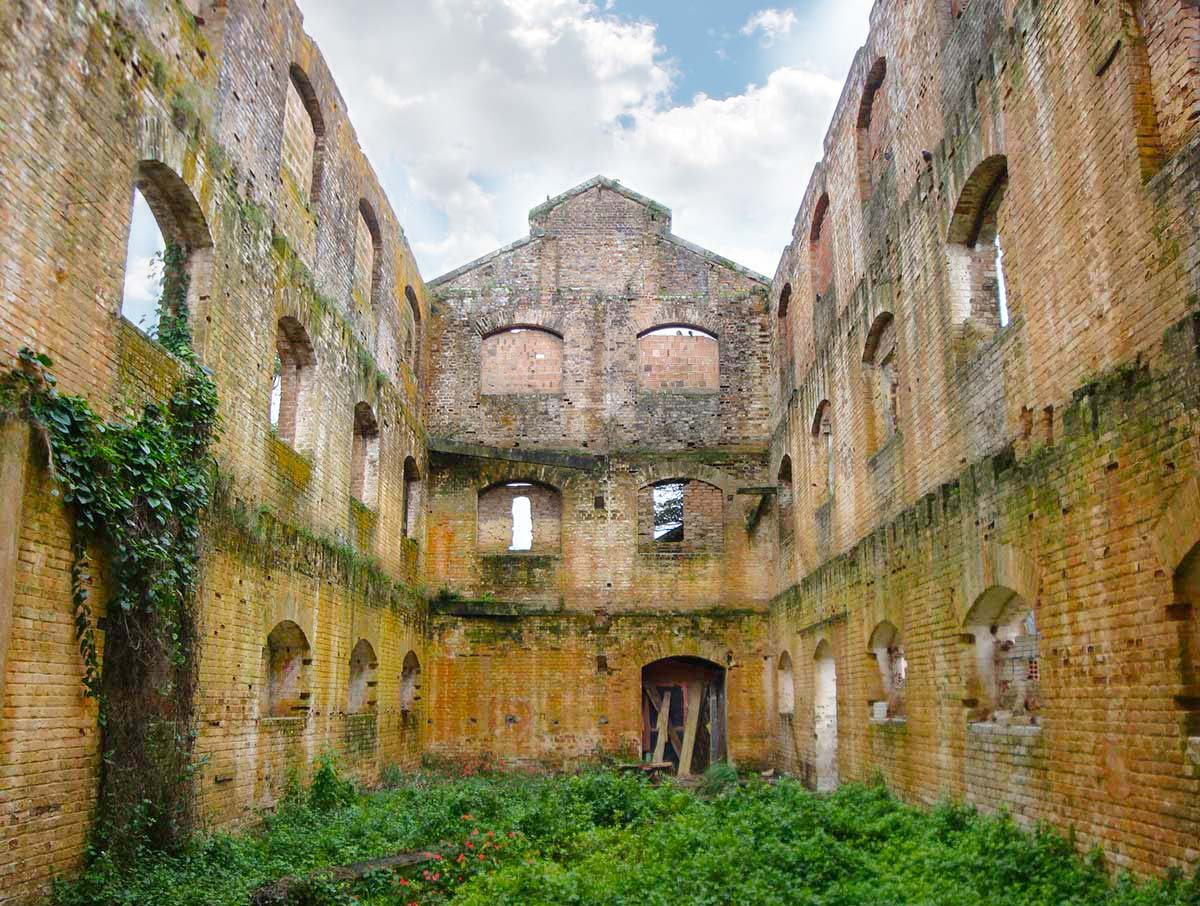
Ruins of an IRFM factory in Iguape

== History ==
=== Foundation ===
Francesco Matarazzo arrived in Brazil in 1881, fleeing a serious economic crisis in Italy. He brought with him a ton of lard, his only capital to start a business. However, in an accident, all his stock ended up at the bottom of the sea. Then he gathered resources and in 1883 he established the Casa Matarazzo in Sorocaba, a warehouse that sold basic goods, which can be considered his first business. There he extracted lard for sale. He then began to travel through cities on the back of a mule, buying pigs and selling lard, an essential culinary item at the time.

In 1890 he moved to the São Paulo and, in the following year, with his brothers Giuseppe and Luigi, Francesco created the company Matarazzo S.A., which had 41 minority shareholders, mainly Italians. The company's main activity was the import of wheat flour and cotton from the United States.

With the Spanish-American War in 1898, which involved some colonies in Central America, the import of flour was compromised. Matarazzo then began to buy the product from Argentina. Then he decided to produce the flour in Brazil. With the help of credit from the British bank The London and Brazilian Bank (later Bank of London and South America), he built a modern mill in São Paulo in 1900.

Moinho Matarazzo, as it came to be called, was the largest industrial facility in the city of São Paulo, which processed 2,500 bags of flour a day, each weighing 44 kilograms.

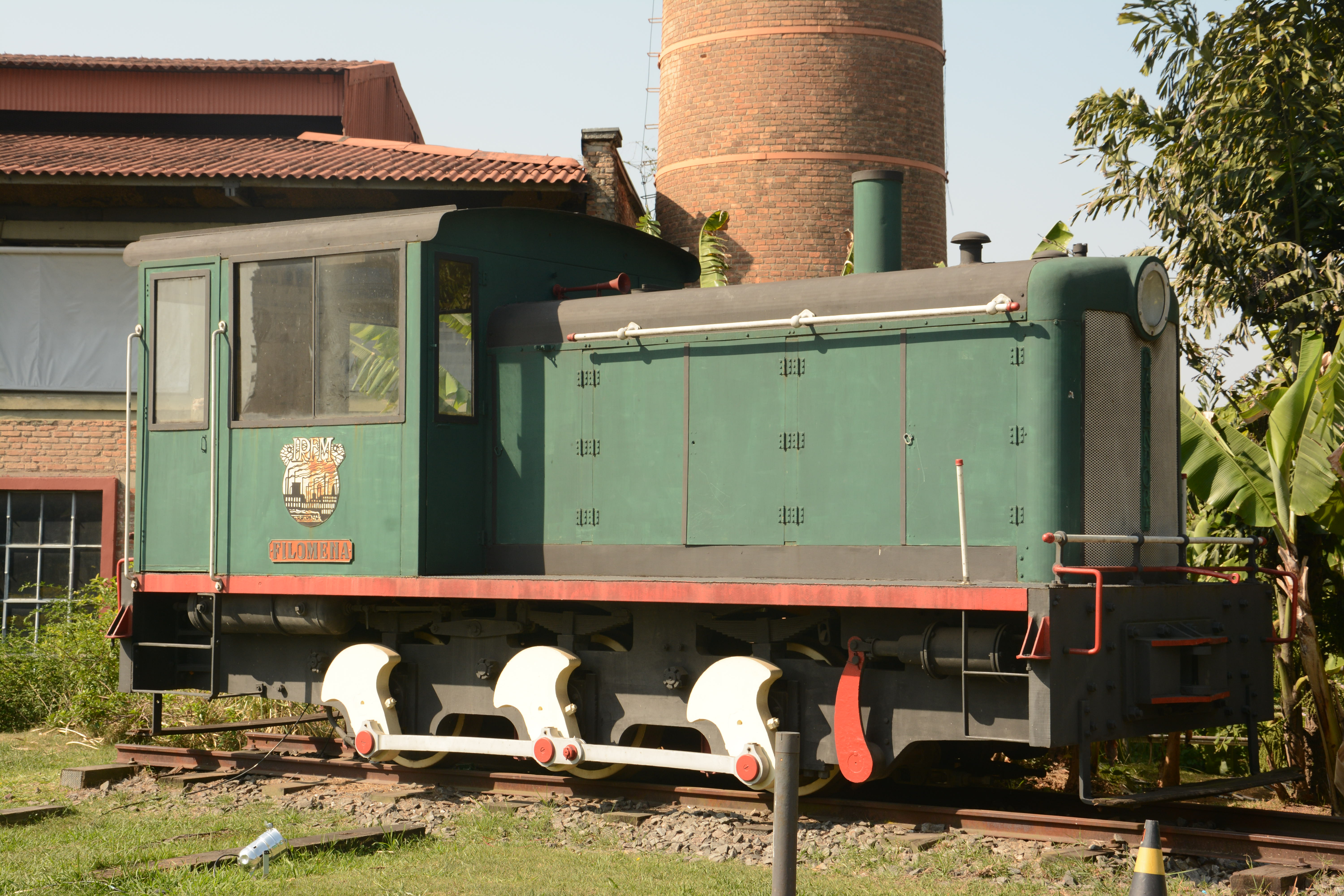
IRFM locomotive

Soon after, Francesco decided to also manufacture the packaging cans, opening a metallurgical plant. Remaining faithful to the practice of investing in different branches of the production chain, he created a cotton weaving company, starting from the sack section of his mill.

In 1911, the industrial facilities that served the varied activities of Matarazzo came together in a formal organization, thus creating the Indústrias Reunidas Fábricas Matarazzo, a joint-stock company. The company's motto was Fides, Honor, Labor.

=== Rise ===
The set of industries quickly achieved great success. Under the motto of “a good deal is made in the purchase, not in the sale”, Francesco Matarazzo was increasingly expanding the company's set of manufacturing units and its range of products.

In 1920, the Água Branca industrial complex was inaugurated, in the west zone of São Paulo, in an area of 100,000 square meters. The place was characterized by its immense brick chimneys, which could be seen from hundreds of meters away. This was the first industrial park in São Paulo with a verticalized notion of production.

Factories of various branches were installed there, such as sawmills, refineries, distillers, slaughterhouses, carts, soaps, perfumes, fertilizers and insecticides, candles, nails and liquors. It also had workers' villages, warehouses, bank and a pioneer film distributor. Everything was supplied with energy from the company's own power plant, at Casa do Eletricista and Casa das Caldeiras, the only remaining buildings of the entire industrial complex to this day.

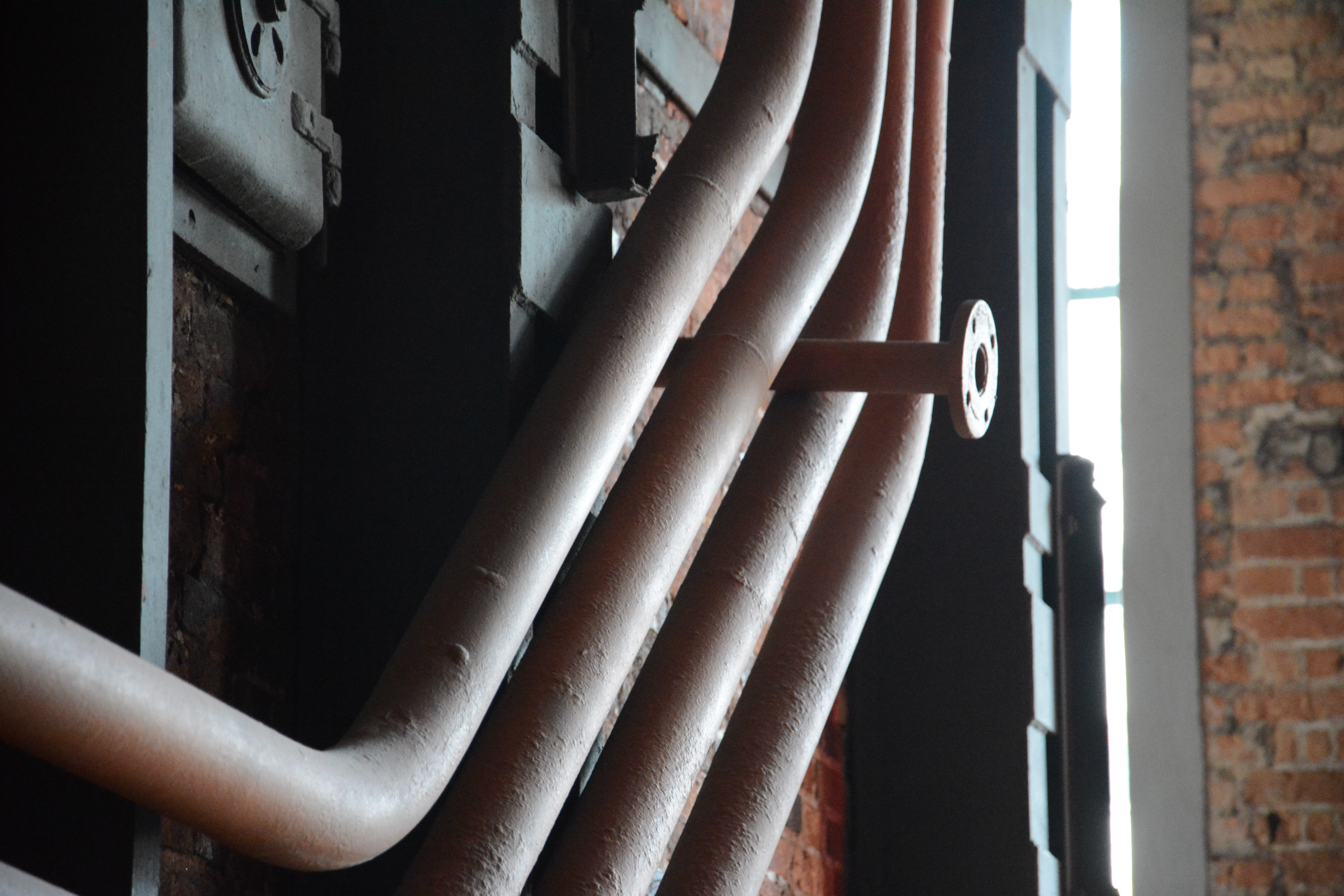
Casa das Caldeiras, which produced energy for the Água Branca industrial complex

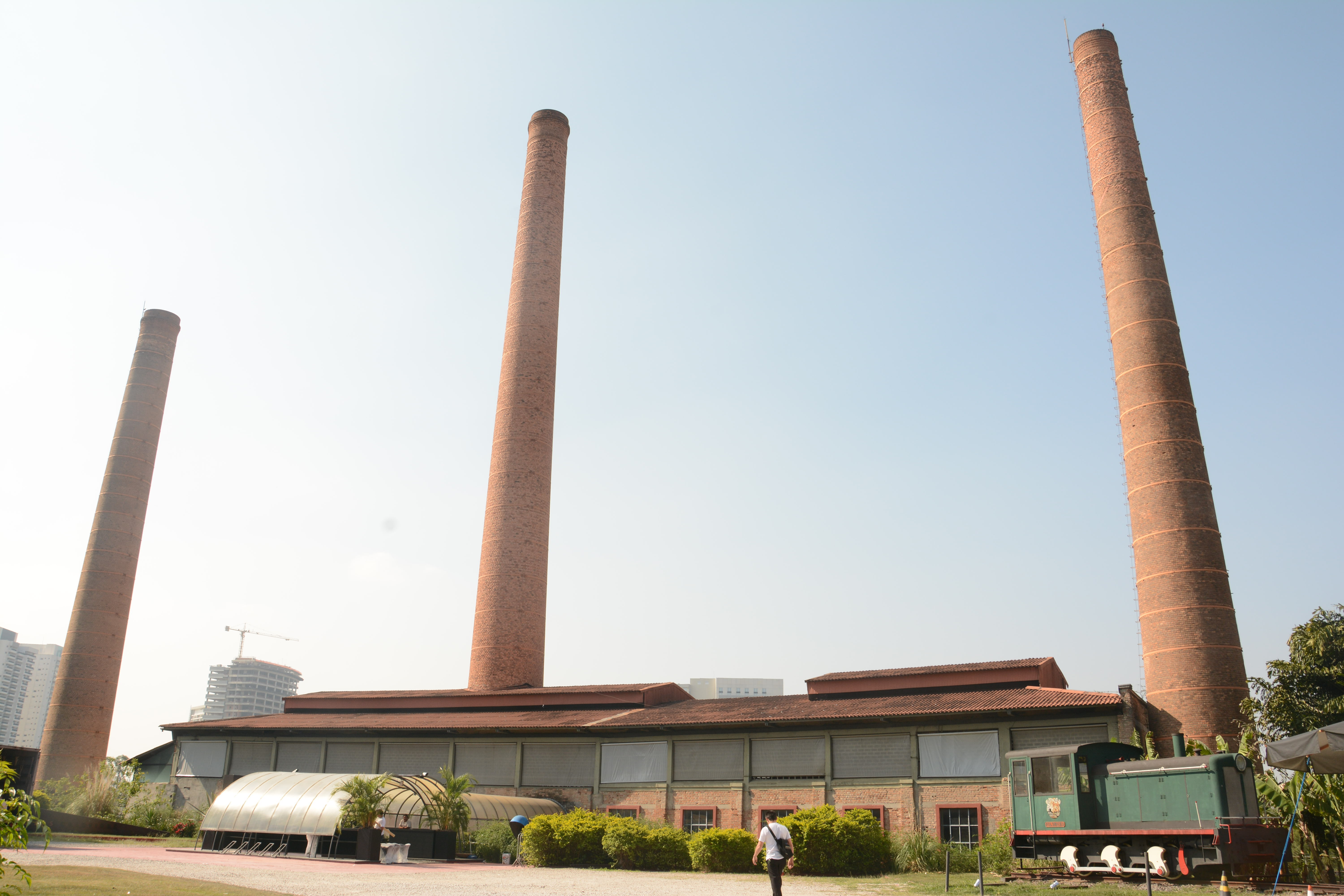
Casa das Caldeiras, one of the remnants of the IRFM

During the 1930s, Indústrias Reunidas Francesco Matarazzo had colossal revenues and reach. The products of the industrial complex were present in the daily lives of almost all Brazilians. IRFM's revenue was smaller only than that of the Federal Government, the National Coffee Department and the State of São Paulo.

In 1937, the installation of the industrial complex in the municipality of Marília began. The unit processed cotton and rice, employing around 400 workers at its peak. The IRFM had great importance in the development of the then young municipality, which came to be known as the "capital of Alta Paulista". The complex even had private access to the railway line for the loading and unloading of its products. In 1975, the IRFM was completely deactivated, and part of the set was listed by CONDEPHAAT as protected heritage in 1992.

Francesco Matarazzo died in 1937, being the owner of the fifth largest fortune in the world at the time, with an estimated net worth of 20 billion dollars in current values.

=== New age ===
Francesco Matarazzo Júnior, son of Francesco Matarazzo, took over the industrial complex. He led the company for 40 years, further expanding its branches of production and inaugurating a new age.

He built factories in the chemical, food and alcohol industries. Among the new products were cellulose, cellophane, cookies, margarine, carbon sulfide, castor oil and insecticides.

In the 60s, new factories were opened, such as perlon, synthetic fibers, plastic laminates and soluble coffee fiber. However, the Matarazzo Industries began to feel the first signs of decline.

=== Decline ===
In 1969, pressure from multinational companies, which had advanced management and advertising techniques, began to affect IRFM's sales, which caused the first negative balance in the company's history.

Concerned with the recent shocks, Francesco Matarazzo Júnior hired the international consultancy Deloitte in order to improve the business, but the action did not work.

Júnior died in 1977, being replaced by Maria Pia Esmeralda Matarazzo, which was 32 years old. Indústrias Reunidas Fábricas Matarazzo was still the largest business conglomerate in Brazil, and Maria decided to concentrate production on the most successful sectors: paper, chemicals and alcohol.

She carried out an administrative reform and started the deactivation of old units that were in deficit. In 1981, the entire textile sector of IRFM was sold to the company Cianê. Between 1981 and 1983, the situation worsened. Maria faced a power struggle with her brothers and the company's revenue dropped even more, caused by repeated shocks in the economy.

In 1983 the group tried to reach an agreement with 27 companies to avoid bankruptcy, which was suspended by the court after two years. Deep in debt due to unpaid loans, the IRFM had several buildings foreclosed, including the entire Água Branca industrial park. In 1990, the entire chemical complex, located in São Caetano do Sul, was deactivated. After two years, with IRFM on the verge of bankruptcy, Maria Matarazzo, relinquished control of the group's main companies, such as Cerâmica Matarazzo, Matarazzo Papéis and Matarazzo Embalagens. In 2013, the penultimate plant was closed in São Paulo.
