= Istituto Italo-Brasiliano Biculturale Fondazione Torino =

- Italian: Fondazione Torino; Portuguese: Fundação Torino

Location
- Rua Jornalista Djalma Andrade, 1300, Piemonte; Nova Lima, Minas Gerais, 34006-203; 19.9736°S 43.9325°W

Information
- Other name: Fondazione Torino; Fundação Torino
- Established: 1975; 51 years ago
- Age: 2 to 18
- Website: www.fundacaotorino.com.br/it/

Istituto Italo-Brasiliano Biculturale Fondazione Torino or Fundação Torino (Italian: Fondazione Torino) is an Italian international school in Belvedere, Belo Horizonte, Brazil.

== School Structure ==
The school serves the following levels: Scuola Materna/Educação Infantil, Scuola Elementare/Esino Fundamental I, Scuola Media/Esino Fundamental II, and Scuola Superiore/Ensino Médio.

== History ==
The school was founded in 1975.

== See also ==
- Italian Brazilian
