= Italian Brazilians =

Brazilians of Italian birth or descent

Italo-brasiliani (Italian) Ítalo-brasileiros (Portuguese)
- Brazil and Italy's flags overlaying

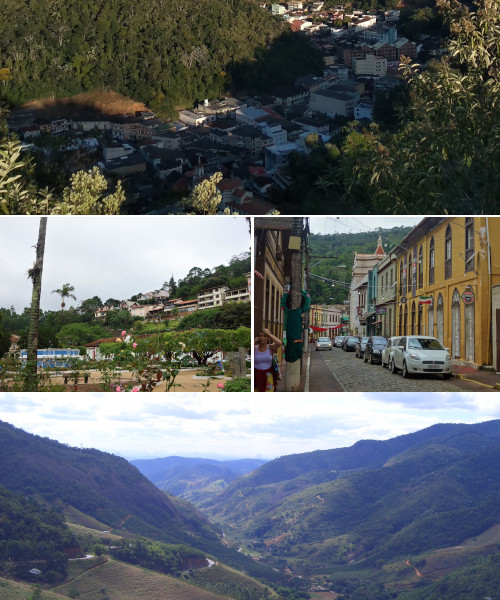
- Italian settlement Santa Teresa, Espírito Santo

Total population
- c. 450,000 (by citizenship) c. 32,000,000 (by ancestry, about 15% of the total Brazilian population) However, there are no official numbers of how many Brazilians have Italian ancestry, as the national census has not asked about the ancestry of the Brazilian people since 1940.

Regions with significant populations
- Southern and Southeast regions

Languages
- Predominantly Brazilian Portuguese. Minority Talian dialect and Italian and/or various Italian languages.

Religion
- Christianity (Roman Catholicism; Protestant); Minorities Spiritism; Judaism; others faiths

Related ethnic groups
- Italians, Italian Americans, Italian Bolivians, Italian Canadians, Italian Chileans, Italian Colombians, Italian Costa Ricans, Italian Cubans, Italian Dominicans, Italian Ecuadorians, Italian Guatemalans, Italian Haitians, Italian Hondurans, Italian Mexicans, Italian Panamanians, Italian Paraguayans, Italian Peruvians, Italian Puerto Ricans, Italian Salvadorans, Italian Uruguayans, Italian Venezuelans, other Brazilians

Italian Brazilians (Italian: italo-brasiliani, Portuguese: ítalo-brasileiros) are Brazilians of full or partial Italian descent, whose ancestors were Italians who emigrated to Brazil during the Italian diaspora, or more recent Italian-born people who've settled in Brazil. Italian Brazilians are the largest number of people with full or partial Italian ancestry outside Italy, with São Paulo being the most populous city with Italian ancestry in the world. Nowadays, it is possible to find millions of descendants of Italians, from the southeastern state of Minas Gerais to the southernmost state of Rio Grande do Sul, with the majority living in São Paulo state. Small southern Brazilian towns, such as Nova Veneza, have as much as 95% of their population of Italian descent.

There are no official numbers of how many Brazilians have Italian ancestry, as the national census conducted by IBGE does not ask the ancestry of the Brazilian people. In 1940, the last census to ask ancestry, 1,260,931 Brazilians were said to be the child of an Italian father, and 1,069,862 said to be the child of an Italian mother. Italians were 285,000 and naturalized Brazilians 40,000. Therefore, Italians and their children were, at most, just over 3.8% of Brazil's population in 1940.

The Embassy of Italy in Brazil, in 2013, reported the number of 32 million descendants of Italian immigrants in Brazil (about 15% of the population), half of them in the state of São Paulo, while there were around 450,000 Italian citizens in Brazil. Brazilian culture has significant connections to Italian culture in terms of language, customs, and traditions. Brazil is also a strongly Italophilic country as cuisine, fashion and lifestyle has been sharply influenced by Italian immigration.

== Italian immigration to Brazil ==
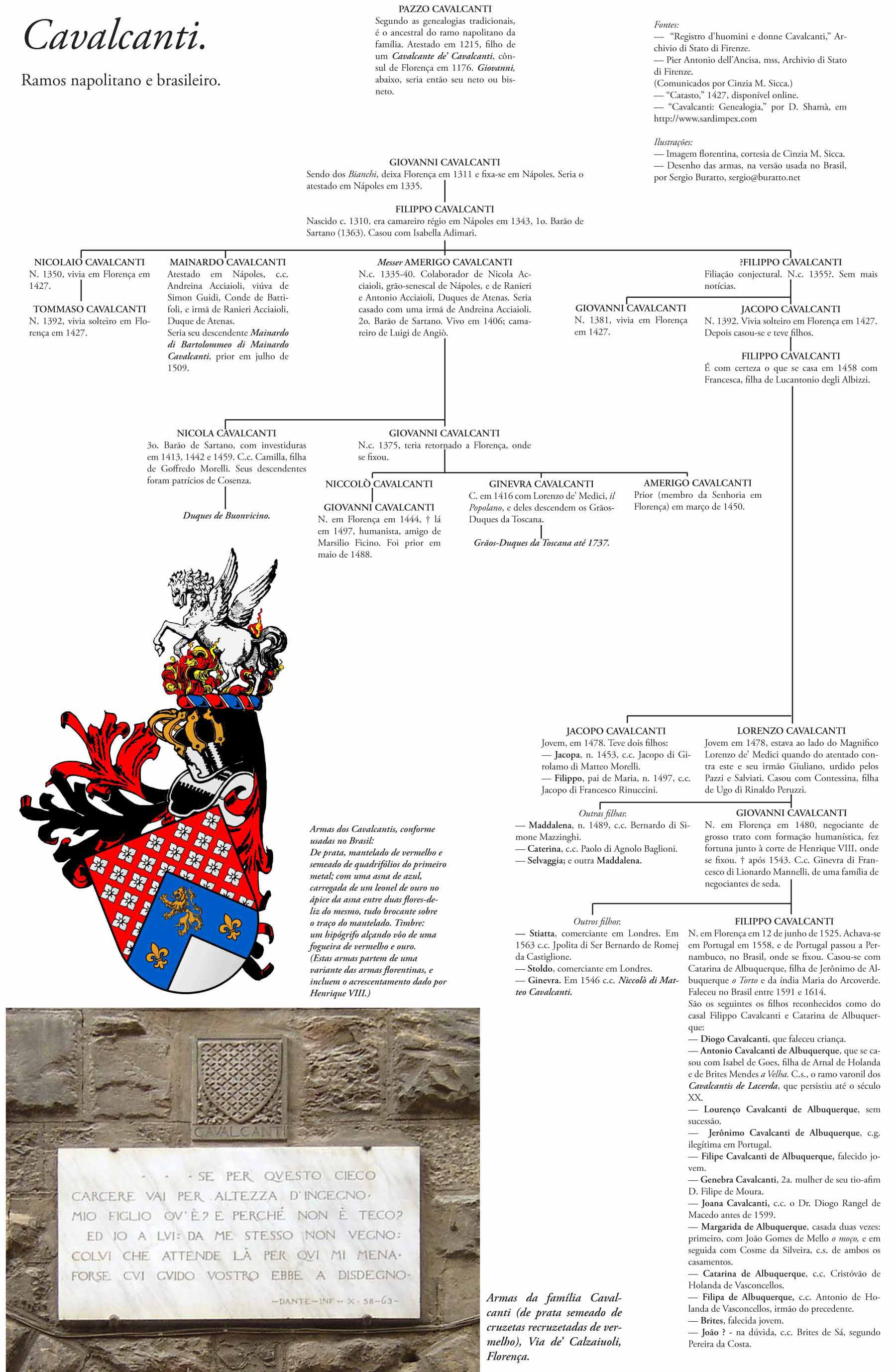
The Cavalcanti family arrived in Brazil in 1560. Today this is the largest family in Brazil by a common ancestor.

According to the Italian government, there are 31 million Brazilians of Italian descent. All figures relate to Brazilians of any Italian descent, not necessarily linked to Italian culture in any significant way. According to García, the number of Brazilians with actual links to Italian identity and culture would be around 3.5 to 4.5 million people. Scholar Luigi Favero, in a book on Italian emigration between 1876 and 1976, pinpointed that Italians were present in Brasil since the Renaissance: Genoese sailors and merchants were among the first to settle in colonial Brazil since the first half of the 16th century, and so, because of the many descendants of Italians who emigrated there from Columbus' times until 1860, the number of Brazilians with Italian roots should be increased to 35 million.

Although they were victims of some prejudice in the first decades and in spite of the persecution during World War II, Brazilians of Italian descent managed to integrate and assimilate seamlessly into the Brazilian society.

Many Brazilian politicians, artists, footballers, models, and personalities are or were of Italian descent. Italian-Brazilians have been state governors, representatives, mayors and ambassadors. Four Presidents of Brazil were of Italian descent (but none of the first three directly elected to such a position): Pascoal Ranieri Mazzilli (Senate president who served as interim president), Itamar Franco (elected vice-president under Fernando Collor, whom he eventually replaced as the latter was impeached), Emílio Garrastazu Médici (third of the series of generals who presided over Brazil during the military regime, also of Basque descent) and Jair Messias Bolsonaro (elected in 2018).

=== Citizenship ===
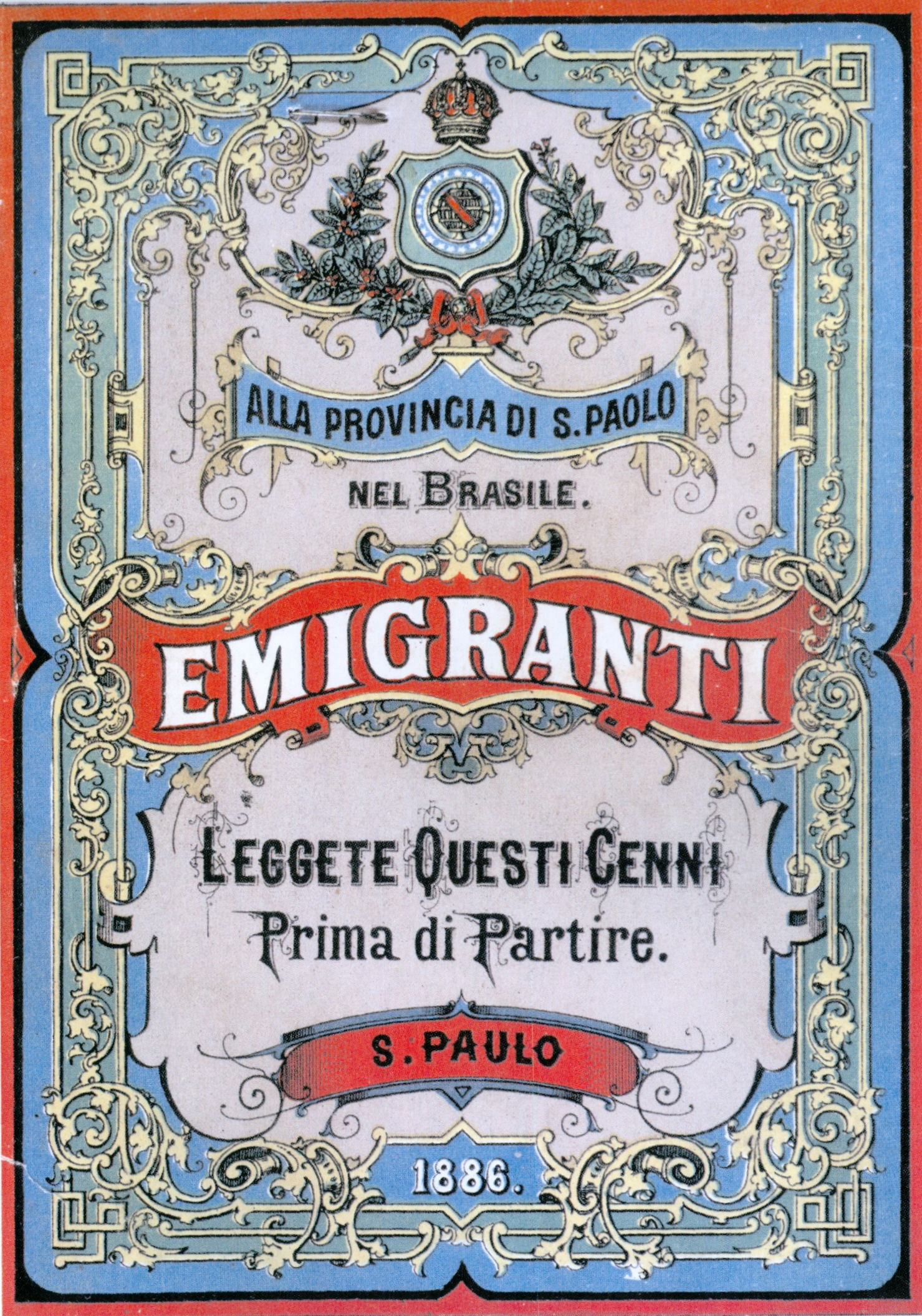
"To the Province of S. Paulo, in Brazil. Immigrants: read these hints before leaving. S. Paulo, 1886"

According to the Brazilian Constitution, anyone born in the country is a Brazilian citizen by birthright. In addition, many born in Italy have become naturalized citizens after they settled in Brazil. The Brazilian government used to prohibit multiple citizenship. However, that changed in 1994 by a new constitutional amendment. After the changes, over half a million Italian-Brazilians have requested recognition of their Italian citizenship.

According to Italian legislation, an individual with an Italian parent is automatically recognized as an Italian citizen. To exercise the rights and obligations of citizenship, individual must have all documents registered in Italy, which normally involves the local consulate or embassy. Some limitations are applied to the process of recognition such as the renouncement of the Italian citizenship by the individual or the parent (if before the child's birth), a second limitation is that women transferred citizenship to their children only after 1948. After a constitutional reform in Italy, Italian citizens abroad may elect representatives to the Italian Chamber of Deputies and the Italian Senate. Italian citizens residing in Brazil elect representatives together with Argentina, Uruguay and other countries in South America. According to Italian Senator Edoardo Pollastri, over half-a-million Brazilians are waiting to have their Italian citizenship recognized.

=== History ===
==== Italian crisis in late 19th century ====
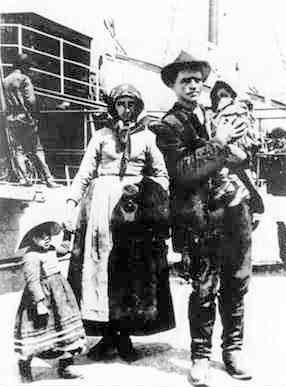
A family of Italian emigrants

Italy did not become a unified national state until 1861. Before then, Italy was politically divided into several kingdoms, duchies, and other small states. The legacy of political fragmentation influenced deeply the character of the Italian migrant: "Before 1914, the typical Italian migrant was a man without a clear national identity but with strong attachments to his town or village or region of birth, to which half of all migrants returned."

In the 19th century, many Italians fled the political persecutions in Italy led by the Imperial Austrian government after the failure of Italian unification movements in 1848 and 1861. Although very small in numbers, the well-educated and revolutionary group of emigrants left a deep mark where they settled. In Brazil, the most famous Italian was then Líbero Badaró (died 1830). However, the mass Italian immigration tide that would only be second to the Portuguese and German migrant movements in shaping modern Brazilian culture started only after the 1848-1871 Risorgimento.

During the last quarter of the 19th century, the newly united Italy suffered an economic crisis. The more industrial northern half of Italy was plagued with high unemployment caused in part by the introduction of modern agricultural techniques, while southern Italy remained underdeveloped and almost untouched by agrarian modernization programs. Even in the North, industrialization was still in its initial stages and illiteracy remained common. Thus, poverty and lack of jobs and income stimulated Northern (and Southern) Italians to emigrate. Most Italian immigrants were very poor rural workers (Italian: braccianti).

==== Brazilian need of immigrants ====
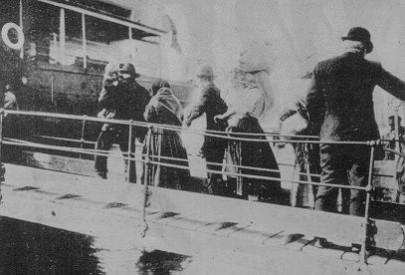
Italians getting into a ship to Brazil, 1910

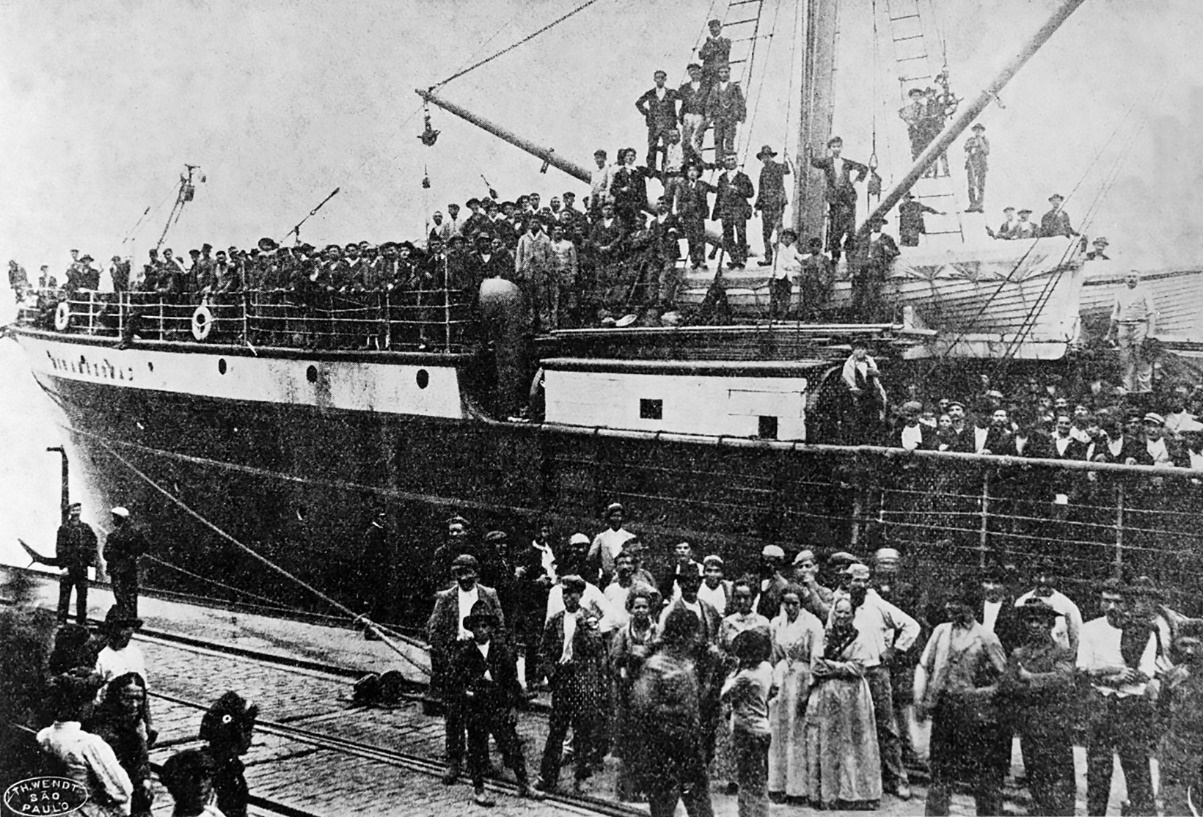
A ship with Italian immigrants in the Port of Santos: 1907. Most migrants came to the State of São Paulo, and its main port, the entry gate of Brazil, was Santos. Thus, most migrants from Italy, regardless of their final destination in Brazil, entered through Santos.

In 1850, under British pressure, Brazil finally passed a law that effectively banned transatlantic slave trade. The increased pressure of the abolitionist movement, on the other hand, made it clear that the days of slavery in Brazil were coming to an end. Slave trade was effectively suppressed, but the slave system still endured for almost four decades. Thus, Brazilian landowners claimed that such migrants were or would soon become indispensable for Brazilian agriculture. They would soon win the argument, and mass migration would begin in earnest.

An Agriculture Congress in 1878 in Rio de Janeiro discussed the lack of labor and proposed to the government the stimulation of European immigration to Brazil. Immigrants from Italy, Portugal, and Spain were considered the best ones because they were Latin-based and mainly Catholic. In particular, Italian immigrants settled mainly in the São Paulo region, where there were vast coffee plantations.

At the end of the 19th century, the Brazilian government was influenced by eugenics theories.

==== Beginning of Italian settlement in Brazil ====
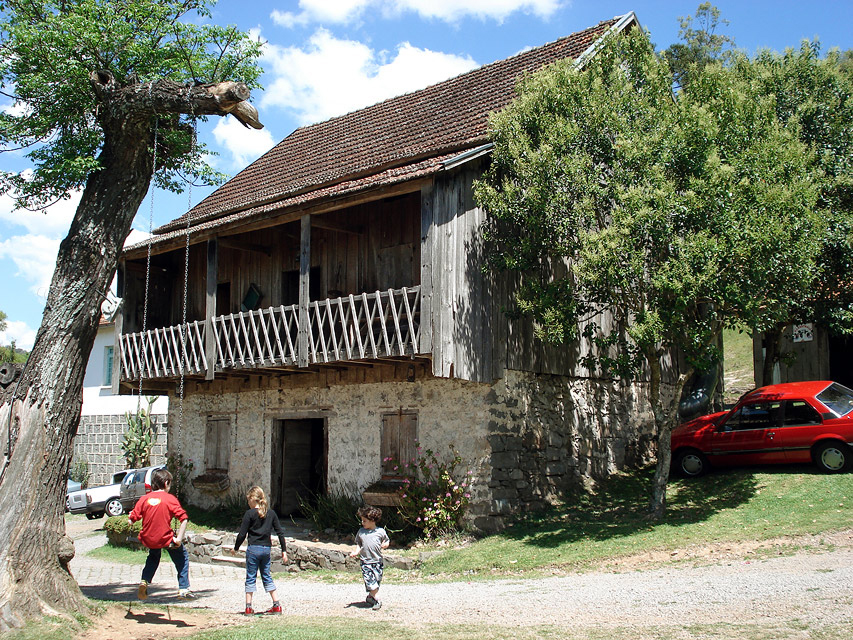
A 19th-century house built by Italian immigrants in Caxias do Sul, Rio Grande do Sul

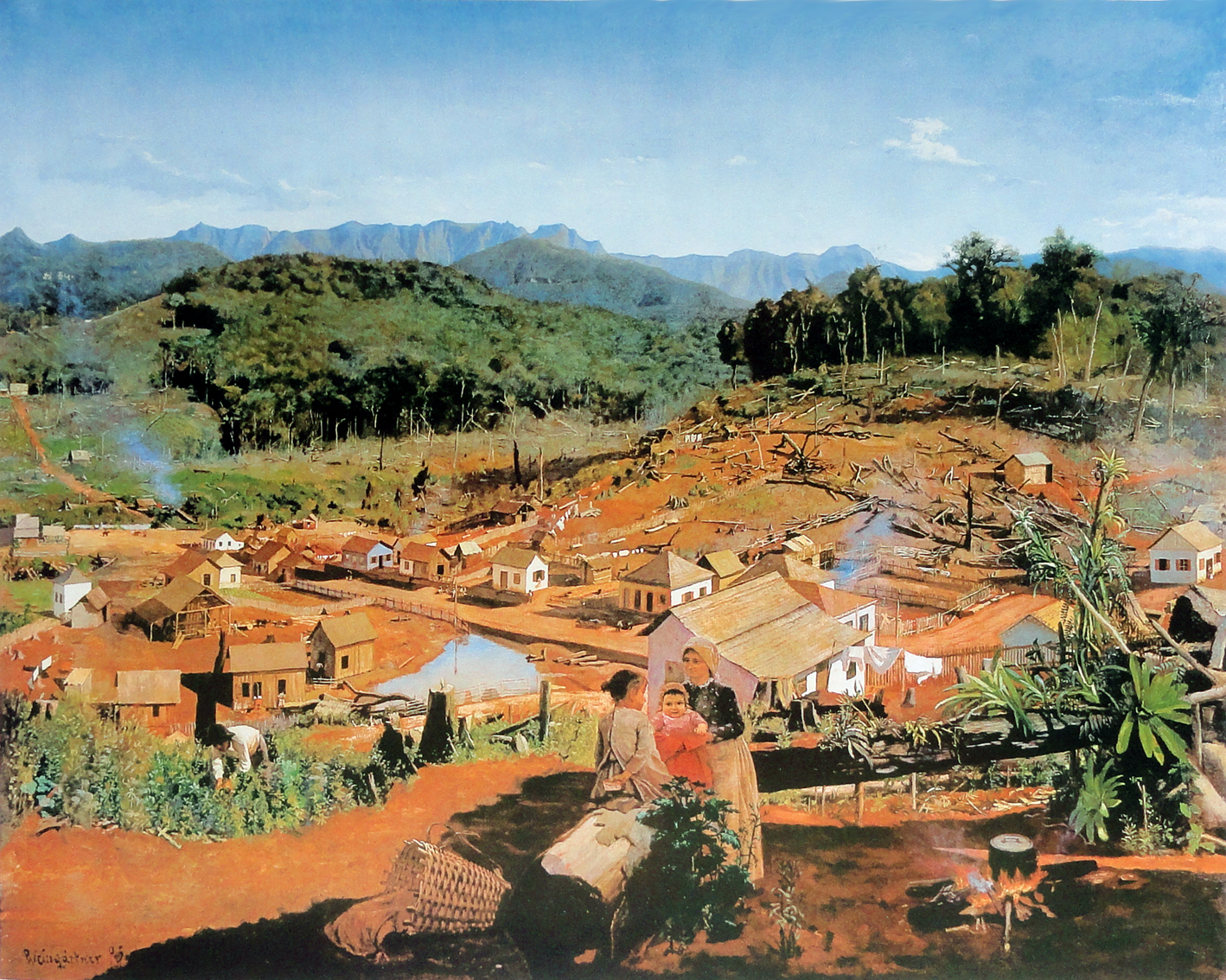
Vida nova by Pedro Weingärtner, 1893. Acervo municipal de Nova Veneza.

The Brazilian government, with or following the Emperor's support, had created the first colonies of immigrants (colônias de imigrantes) in the early 19th century. The colonies were established in rural areas of the country, being settled by European families.

The first groups of Italians arrived in 1875, but the boom of Italian immigration in Brazil happened between 1880 and 1900, when almost one million Italians arrived.

Many Italians were naturalized Brazilian at the end of the 19th century, when the 'Great Naturalization' automatically granted citizenship to all the immigrants residing in Brazil prior to 15 November 1889 "unless they declared a desire to keep their original nationality within six months."

During the end of the 19th century, denouncement of bad conditions in Brazil aggravated by the crisis in coffee plantations in São Paulo, increased in the press. Reacting to the public clamor, the Italian emigration inspector Adolfo Rossi undertook an investigation into the conditions faced by Italian emigrants on the fazendas, travelling undercover, disguised as a peasant. Rossi's report painted a dramatic picture of the semi-slavery conditions based on the testimonies collected: women raped, men whipped, discipline that "makes the fazenda look like a colony of convicts under compulsory residence," disease, failure to pay wages or delays in payment, misery.

As a result, the government of Italy issued in 1902 the Prinetti Decree forbidding subsidized immigration and withdrawing the permission given to Brazil for the free importation of Italians to the farms and plantations in that country. In consequence, the number of Italian immigrants in Brazil fell drastically in the beginning of the 20th century, but the wave of Italian immigration continued until 1920.

Over half of the Italian immigrants came from northern Italian regions of Veneto, Lombardy and Emilia-Romagna, and from the central Italian region of Tuscany. About 30% emigrated from Veneto. On the other hand, in the 20th century, southern Italians predominated in Brazil, coming from the regions of Campania, Abruzzo, Molise, Basilicata and Sicily.

==== Prince Umberto's visit in 1924 ====
In 1924, Umberto, Prince of Piedmont (the future King Umberto II of Italy) came to Brazil as part of a state visit to various South American countries. That was part of the political plan of the new fascist government to link Italian people living outside of Italy with their mother country and the interests of the regime. The visit was disrupted considerably by the ongoing Tenente revolts, which made it impossible for Umberto to reach Rio de Janeiro and São Paulo. Nevertheless, he was hosted at Bahia, where members of the Italian colony in the city were very happy and proud about his visit, thus achieving some of the visit's purposes.

== Statistics ==
=== 1940 Brazilian census ===
The Brazilian census of 1940 asked Brazilians where their fathers came from. It revealed that at that time there were 3,275,732 Brazilians who were born to an immigrant father. Of those, 1,260,931 Brazilians were born to an Italian father. Italian was the main reported paternal immigrant origin, followed by Portuguese with 735,929 children, Spanish with 340,479 and German with 159,809 children.

The census also revealed that the 458,281 foreign mothers of 12 or more years who lived in Brazil had 2,852,427 children, of whom 2,657,974 were born alive. Italian women had more children than any other female immigrant community in Brazil: 1,069,862 Brazilians were born to an Italian mother, followed by 524,940 who were born to a Portuguese mother, 436,305 to a Spanish mother and 171,790 to a Japanese mother. The 6,809,772 Brazilian-born mothers of 12 or more years had 38,716,508 children, of whom 35,777,402 were born alive.

Brazilians who were born to a foreign-born father (1940 Census)
Main place of birth of the father	Number of children
Italy	1,260,931
Portugal	735,929
Spain	340,479
Germany	159,809
Syria- Lebanon- Palestine- Iraq - Middle-Eastern	107,074
Japan-Korea	104,355

Women over 12 years old who had offspring in Brazil and their children, by country of birth (1940 Census)
Country of birth of the mother	Number of females over 12 years old who had children	Number of children
Italy	130,273	1,069,862
Portugal	99,197	524,940
Spain	66,354	436,305
Japan	35,640	171,790
Germany	22,232	98,653
Brazil	6,809,772	38,716,508

=== Others ===
On the other hand, in 1998, the IBGE, within its preparation for the 2000 Census, experimentally introduced a question about "origem" (ancestry) in its "Pesquisa Mensal de Emprego" (Monthly Employment Survey) to test the viability of introducing that variable in the census (the IBGE ended by deciding against the inclusion of questions about it in the Census). The research interviewed about 90,000 people in six metropolitan regions (São Paulo, Rio de Janeiro, Porto Alegre, Belo Horizonte, Salvador, and Recife).

Arrival of Italian immigrants to Brazil by periods (source: IBGE)
1884-1893	1894–1903	1904–1913	1914–1923	1924–1933	1934–1944	1945–1949	1950–1954	1955–1959
510,533	537,784	196,521	86,320	70,177	15,312	N/A	59,785	31,263

Italian population in Brazil
Year	Estimated Italian population (by Giorgio Mortara)	Year	Italian estimates	Year	Brazilian Census
1880	50,000	1881*	82,000		
1890	230,000	1891*	554,000		
1900	540,000	1901**	1,300,000		
1902	600,000	1904**	1,100,000		
1930	435,000	1927*	1,837,887	1920	558,405
1940	325,000			1940	325,283

.* Commissariato Generale dell'Emigrazione

.** Consulates

The 1920 census was the first one to show a more specific figure about the size of the Italian population in Brazil (558,405). However, since the 20th century, the arrival of new Italian immigrants to Brazil has been in steady decline. The previous censuses of 1890 and 1900 had limited information. In consequence, there are no official figures about the size of the Italian population in Brazil during the mass immigration period (1880–1900). There are estimates available, and the most reliable was done by Giorgio Mortara even though his figures may have underestimated the real size of the Italian population. On the other hand, Angelo Trento believes that the Italian estimates are "certainly exaggerated" and "lacking of any foundation" since they found a figure of 1,837,887 Italians in Brazil for 1927. Another evaluation conducted by Bruno Zuculin found 997,887 Italians in Brazil in 1927. All of those figures include only people born in Italy, not their Brazilian-born descendants.

== Main Italian settlements in Brazil ==
=== Areas of settlement ===
Among all Italians who immigrated to Brazil, 70% went to the State of São Paulo. In consequence, São Paulo has more people with Italian ancestry than any region of Italy itself. The rest went mostly to the states of Rio Grande do Sul and Minas Gerais.

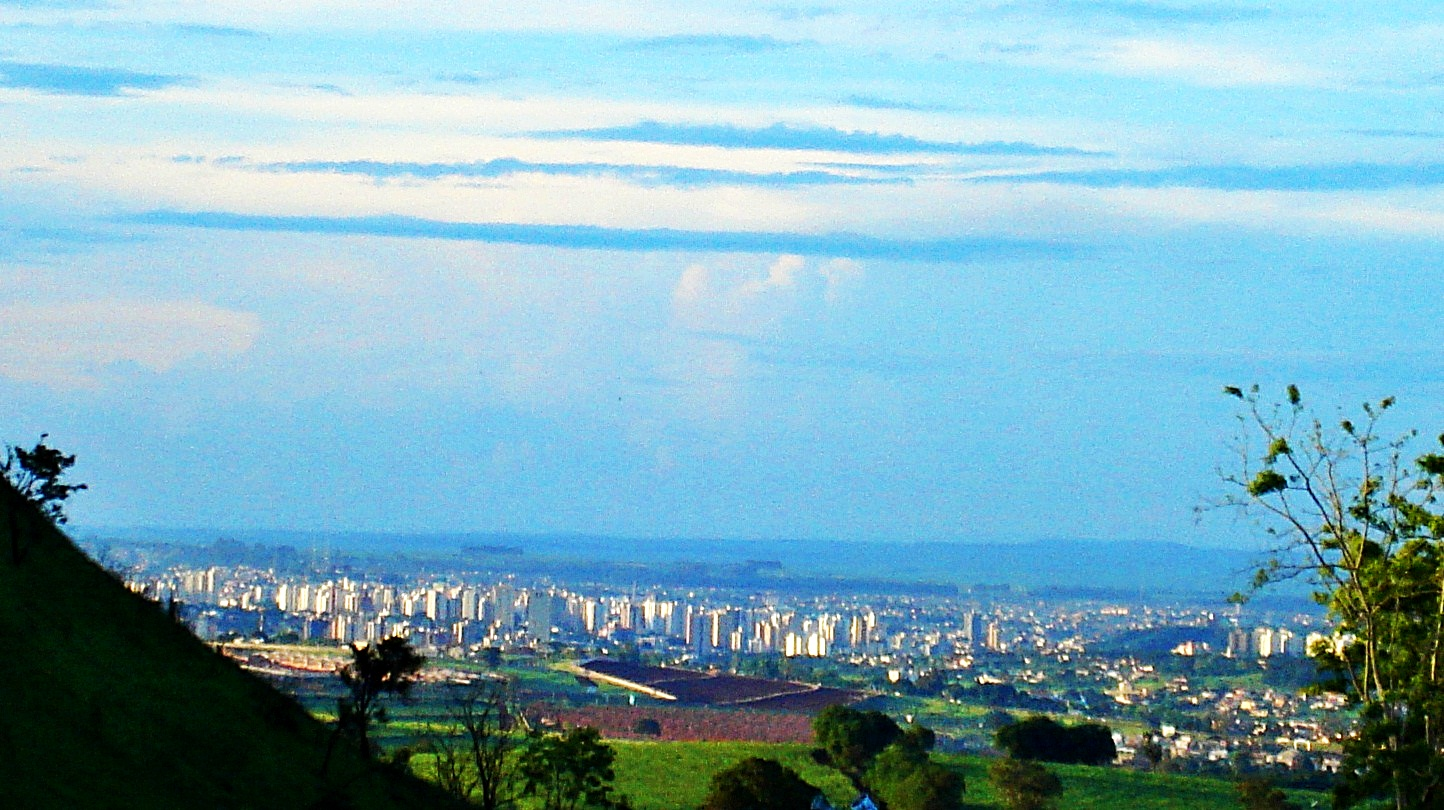
Panoramic view of Ribeirão Preto. By 1902, 52% percent of the city's population was born in Italy.

Internal migration made many second- and third-generation Italians move to other areas. In the early 20th century, many rural Italian workers from Rio Grande do Sul migrated to the west of Santa Catarina and then farther north to Paraná.

More recently, third- and fourth-generation Italians have migrated to other areas and so people of Italian descent can be found in Brazilian regions in which the immigrants had never settled, such as in the Cerrado region of Central-West, in the Northeast and in the Amazon rainforest area, in the extreme North of Brazil.

Farms owned by a foreigner (1920)
Immigrants	Farms
Italians	35.984
Portuguese	9.552
Germans	6.887
Spanish	4.725
Russians	4.471
Austrians	4.292
Japanese	1.167

=== Southern Brazil ===
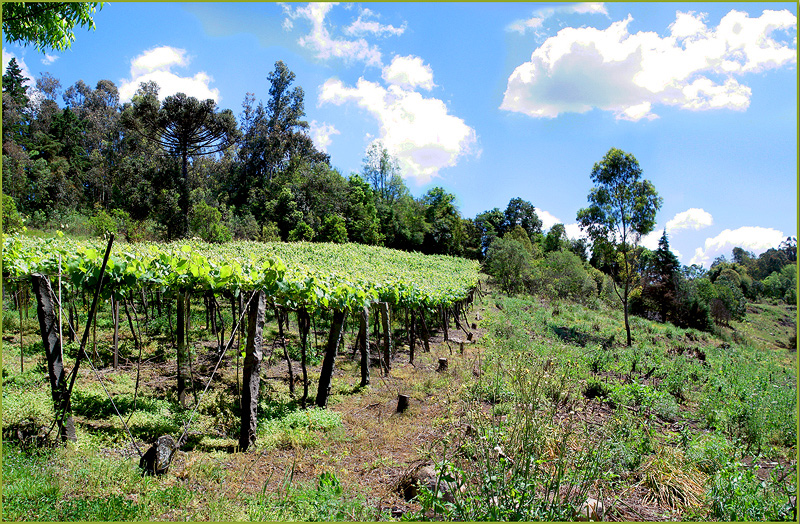
Wine production introduced by Italians in Caxias do Sul

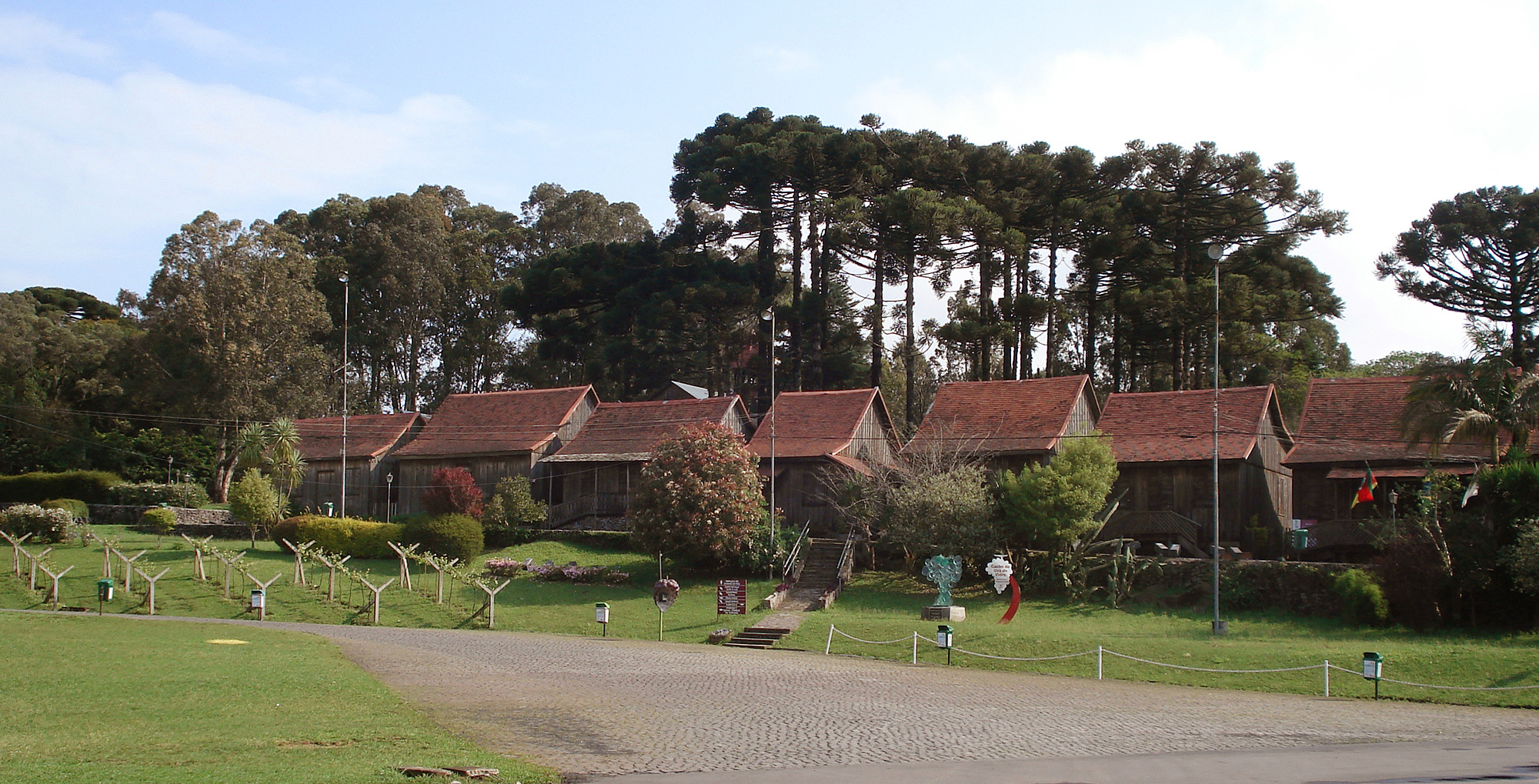
A typically Venetian community in Southern Brazil

The main areas of Italian settlement in Brazil were the Southern and Southeastern Regions, namely the states of São Paulo, Rio Grande do Sul, Santa Catarina, Paraná, Espírito Santo and Minas Gerais.

The first colonies to be populated by Italians were created in the highlands of Rio Grande do Sul (Serra Gaúcha). They were Garibaldi and Bento Gonçalves. The immigrants were predominantly from Veneto, in northern Italy. After five years, in 1880, the great numbers of Italian immigrants arriving caused the Brazilian government to create another Italian colony, Caxias do Sul. After initially settling in the government-promoted colonies, many Italian immigrants spread into other areas of Rio Grande do Sul, seeking better opportunities, and created many other Italian colonies on their own, mainly in highlands, because the lowlands were already populated by German immigrants and native gaúchos.

Italians established many vineyards in the region. The wine produced in those areas of Italian colonization in southern Brazil is much appreciated within the country, but little is available for export. In 1875, the first Italian colonies were established in Santa Catarina, which lies immediately to the north of Rio Grande do Sul. The colonies gave rise to towns such as Criciúma, and later also spread further north, to Paraná.

In the colonies of southern Brazil, Italian immigrants at first stuck to themselves, where they could speak their native Italian dialects and keep their culture and traditions. With time, however, they would become thoroughly integrated economically and culturally into the larger society. In any case, Italian immigration to southern Brazil was very important to the economic development and the culture of the region.

=== Southeastern Brazil ===
Imagine you travel eight thousand nautic miles, across the Mediterranean and the Atlantic and suddenly find yourself in Italy. That's São Paulo. It seems paradoxical, but it is a reality, because São Paulo is an Italian city.

— Pietro Belli, Italian journalist in São Paulo (1925)

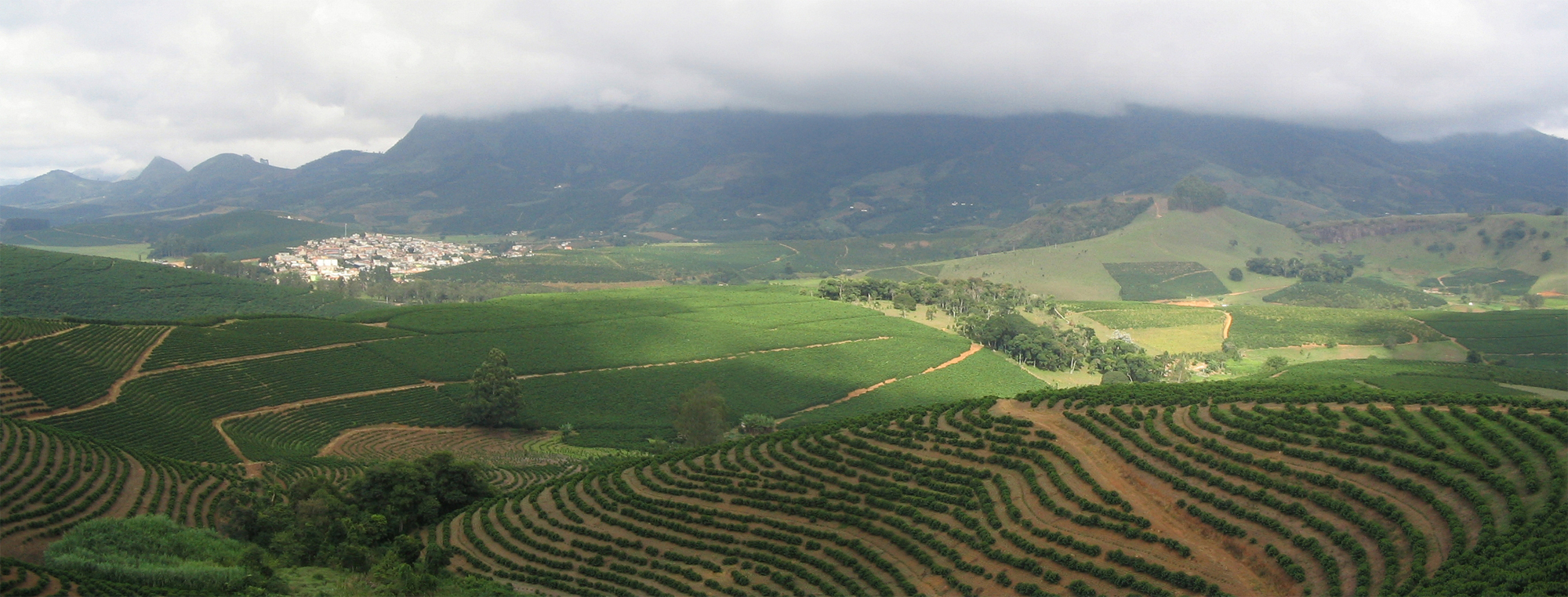
Coffee plantation in the State of Minas Gerais which employed Italians

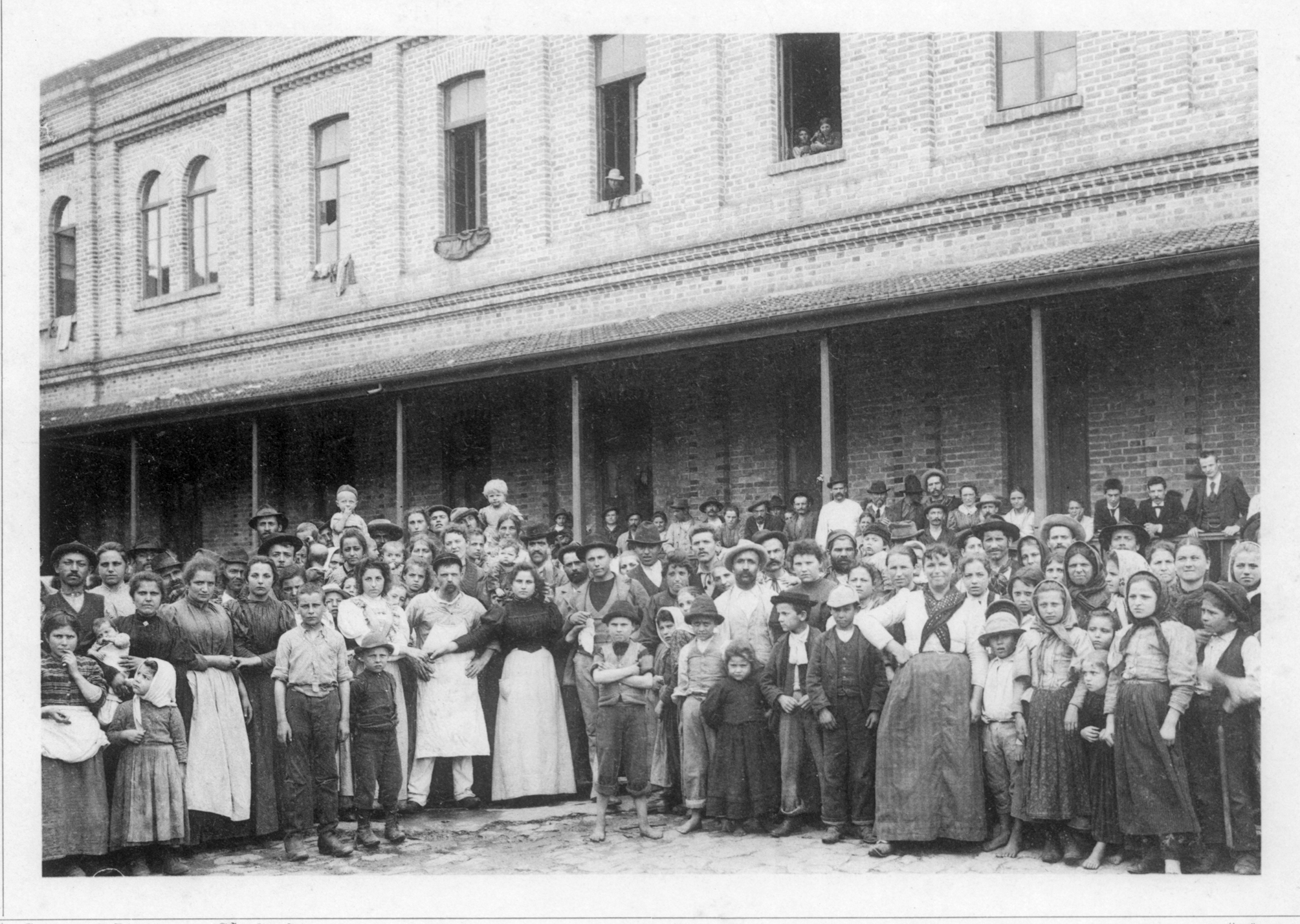
Italian immigrants in the Hospedaria dos Imigrantes, in São Paulo

Some of the immigrants settled in the colonies in Southern Brazil. However, most of them settled in Southeastern Brazil (mainly in the State of São Paulo). At first, the government was responsible for bringing the immigrants (in most cases, paying for their transportation by ship), but later, the farmers were responsible for making contracts with immigrants or specialized companies in recruiting Italian workers. Many posters were spread in Italy, with pictures of Brazil, selling the idea that everybody could become rich there by working with coffee, which was called by the Italian immigrants the green gold. Most coffee plantations were in the States of São Paulo and Minas Gerais, and in a smaller proportion also in the States of Espírito Santo and Rio de Janeiro.

Rio de Janeiro was declining in the 19th century as a farming producer, and São Paulo had already taken the lead as a coffee producer/exporter in the early 20th century, as well as big producer of sugar and other important crops. Thus, migrants were naturally more attracted to the State of São Paulo and the southern states.

Italians migrated to Brazil as families. The colono, as a rural immigrant was called, had to sign a contract with the farmer to work in the coffee plantation for a minimum period of time. However, the situation was not easy. Many Brazilian farmers were used to command slaves and treated the immigrants as indentured servants.

In Southern Brazil, the Italian immigrants were living in relatively well-developed colonies, but in Southeastern Brazil they were living in semislavery conditions in the coffee plantations. Many rebellions against Brazilian farmers occurred, and public denouncements caused great commotion in Italy, forcing the Italian government to issue the Prinetti Decree, which established barriers to immigration to Brazil.

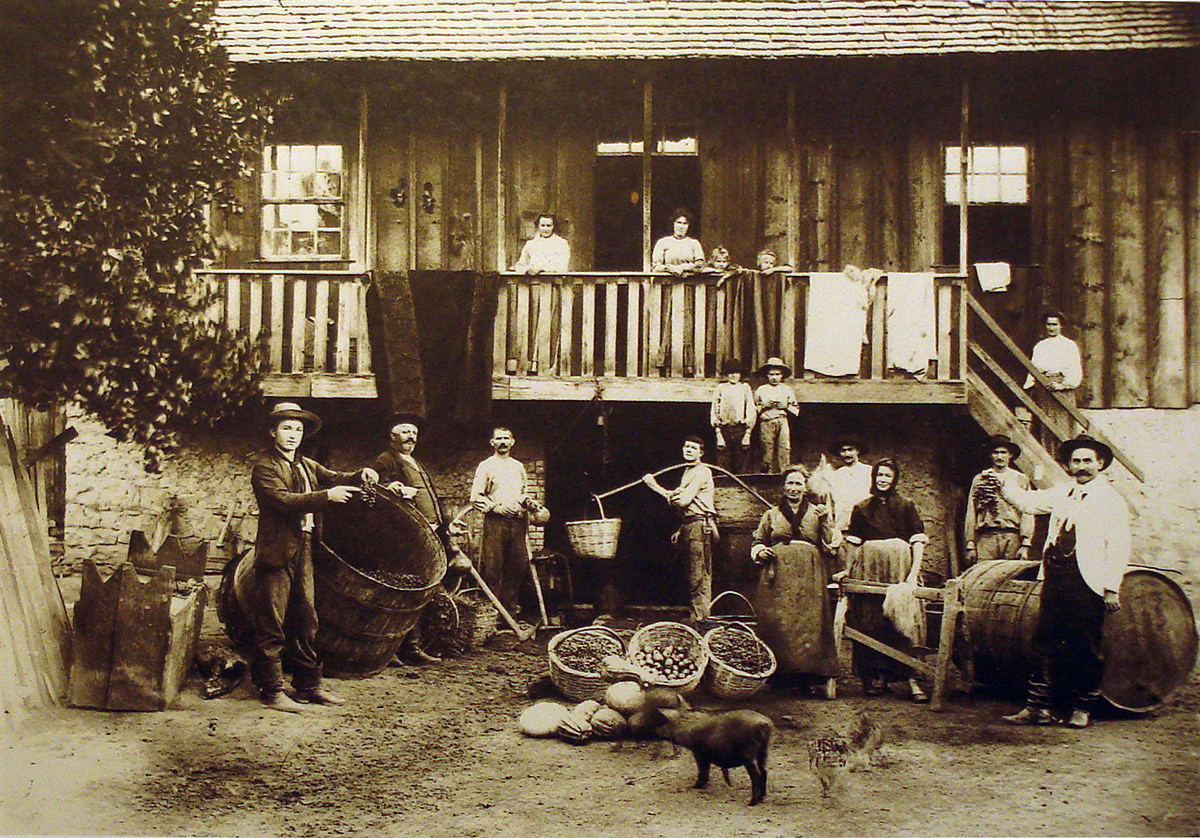
Italian-Brazilian farmers in 1918

São Paulo City
Year	Italians	Percentage of the city
1886	5,717	13%
1893	45,457	35%
1900	75,000	31%
1910	130,000	33%
1916	187,540	37%

In 1901, 90% of industrial workers and 80% of construction workers in São Paulo were Italians.

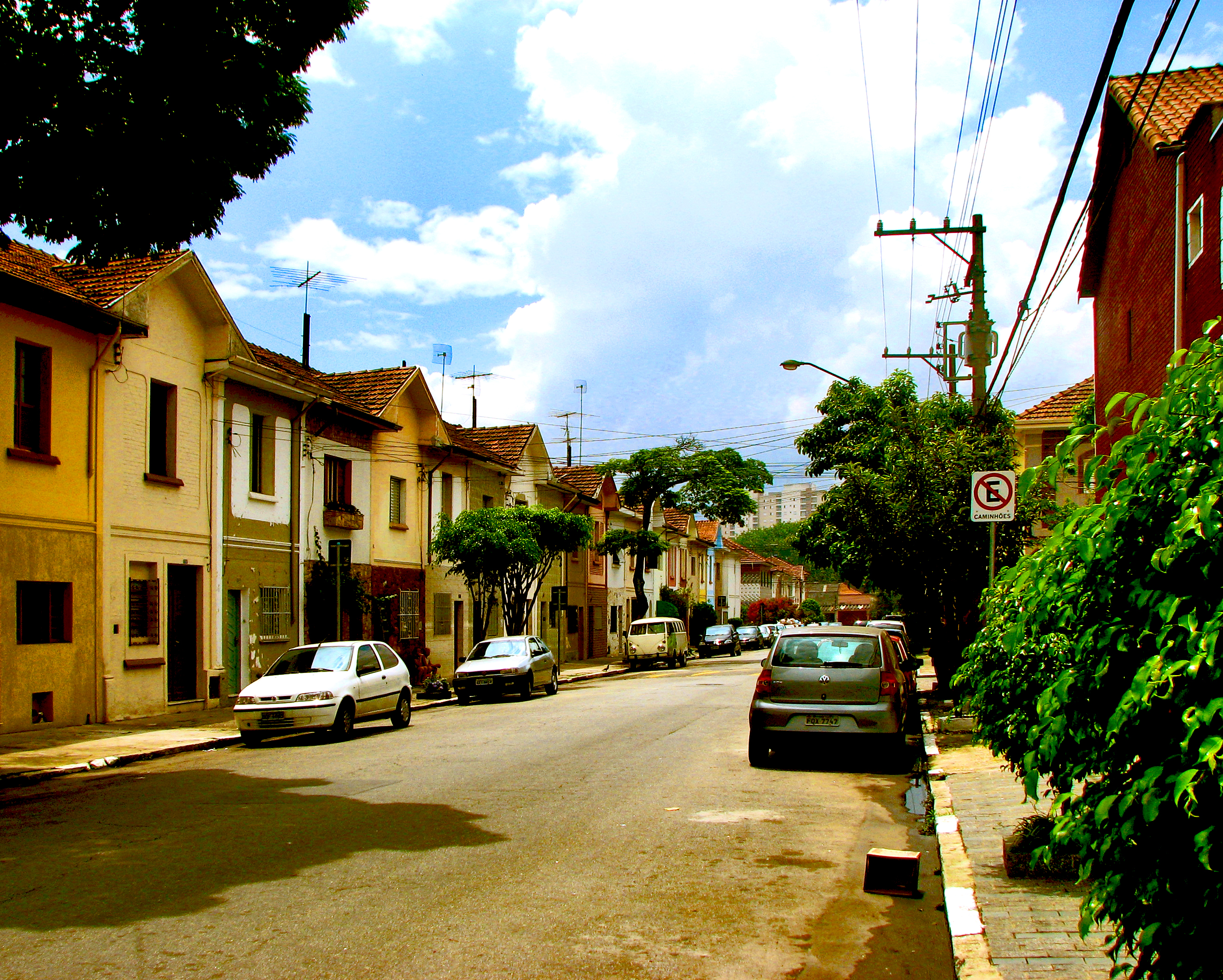
In the new neighborhoods follow up to infinite Italians houses, with balustrades, mantels, decorations in stucco and colorful symbolic figurines. Lonis-Albert Gaffrée, a French priest in São Paulo (1911). Photo of Mooca.

São Carlos
Year	Italians	Percentage of the city
1886	1,050	6,5%
1920	8,235	15%
1934	4,185	8,1%
1940	2,467	5%

Ribeirão Preto
Year	Italians	Percentage of the city
1886	158	1,5%
1920	10,907	16%
1934	6,211	7,6%
1940	3,777	4,7%

São Carlos and Ribeirão Preto were two of the main coffee plantation centers. Both were respectively in the North-Central and Northeastern regions of São Paulo state, a zone known by its hot temperature and a fertile soil in which some of the richest coffee farms were and attracted most immigrants arriving in São Paulo, including Italians, between 1901 and 1940.

Rio de Janeiro City
Year	Italians
1895	20,000
1901	30,000
1910	35,000
1920	31,929
1940	22,768

=== Other parts of Brazil ===
In the State of Mato Grosso do Sul, Italian descendants are 5% of the population.

== Decline of Italian immigration ==
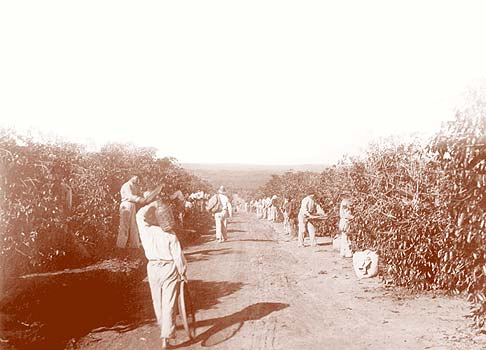
Italians on Brazilian coffee plantation

In 1902, the Italian immigration to Brazil started to decline. From 1903 to 1920, only 306,652 Italians immigrated to Brazil, compared to 953,453 to Argentina and 3,581,322 to the United States. This was mainly due to the Prinetti Decree in Italy, banning subsidized immigration to Brazil. The Prinetti Decree was issued because of the commotion in the Italian press about the poverty faced by most Italians in Brazil.

The end of slavery made most former slaves left the plantations and so there was a labour shortage on coffee plantations. Moreover, "natural inequality of human beings", "hierarchy of races", Social Darwinism, Positivism and other theories were used to explain that the European workers were superior to the native workers. In consequence, passages were offered to Europeans (the so-called "subsidized immigration"), mostly to Italians, so that they could come to Brazil and work on the plantations.

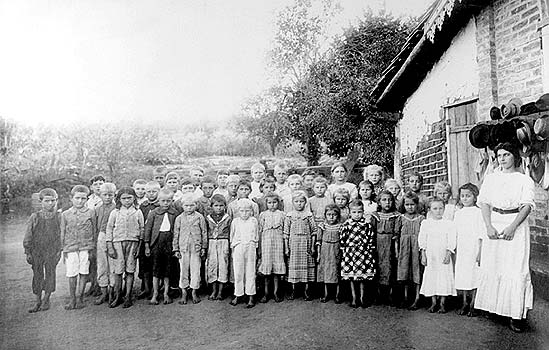
Italian students in a rural school of São Paulo

Those immigrants were employed in enormous latifundia (large-scale farms), formerly employing slaves. In Brazil, there were no labour laws (the first concrete labour laws appeared only in the 1930s, under President Getúlio Vargas) and so workers had almost no legal protection. Contracts signed by the immigrants could easily be violated by the Brazilian landowners who were accustomed to dealing with African slaves.

The remnants of slavery influenced how Brazilian landowners dealt with Italian workers: immigrants were often monitored, with extensive hours of work. In some cases, they were obliged to buy products that they needed from the landowner. Moreover, the coffee farms were located in rather isolated regions. If the immigrants became sick, they would take hours to reach the nearest hospital.

The structure of labor used on farms included the labor of Italian women and children. Keeping their Italian culture was also made more difficult: the Catholic churches and Italian cultural centers were far from farms. The immigrants who did not accept the standards imposed by landowners were replaced by other immigrants. That forced them to accept the impositions of landowners, or they would have to leave their lands. Even though Italians were considered to be "superior" to blacks by Brazilian landowners, the situation faced by Italians in Brazil was so similar to that of the slaves that farmers called them escravos brancos (white slaves in Portuguese).

The destitution faced by Italians and other immigrants in Brazil caused great commotion in the Italian press, which culminated in the Prinetti Decree in 1902. Many immigrants left Brazil after their experience on São Paulo's coffee farms. Between 1882 and 1914, 1.5 million immigrants of different nationalities came to São Paulo, and 695,000 left the state, or 45% of the total. The high numbers of Italians asking the Italian consulate a passage to leave Brazil was so significant that in 1907, most Italian funds for repatriation were used in Brazil. It is estimated that, between 1890 and 1904, 223,031 (14,869 annually) Italians left Brazil, mainly after failed experiences on coffee farms. Most of the Italians who left the country were unable to add the money they wanted. Most returned to Italy, but others remigrated to Argentina, Uruguay or to the United States.

The output of immigrants concerned Brazilian landowners, who constantly complained about the lack of workers. Spanish immigrants began arriving in greater numbers, but soon, Spain also started to create barriers for further immigration of Spaniards to coffee farms in Brazil. The continuing problem of lack of labor in the farms was, then, temporarily resolved with the arrival of Japanese immigrants, from 1908.

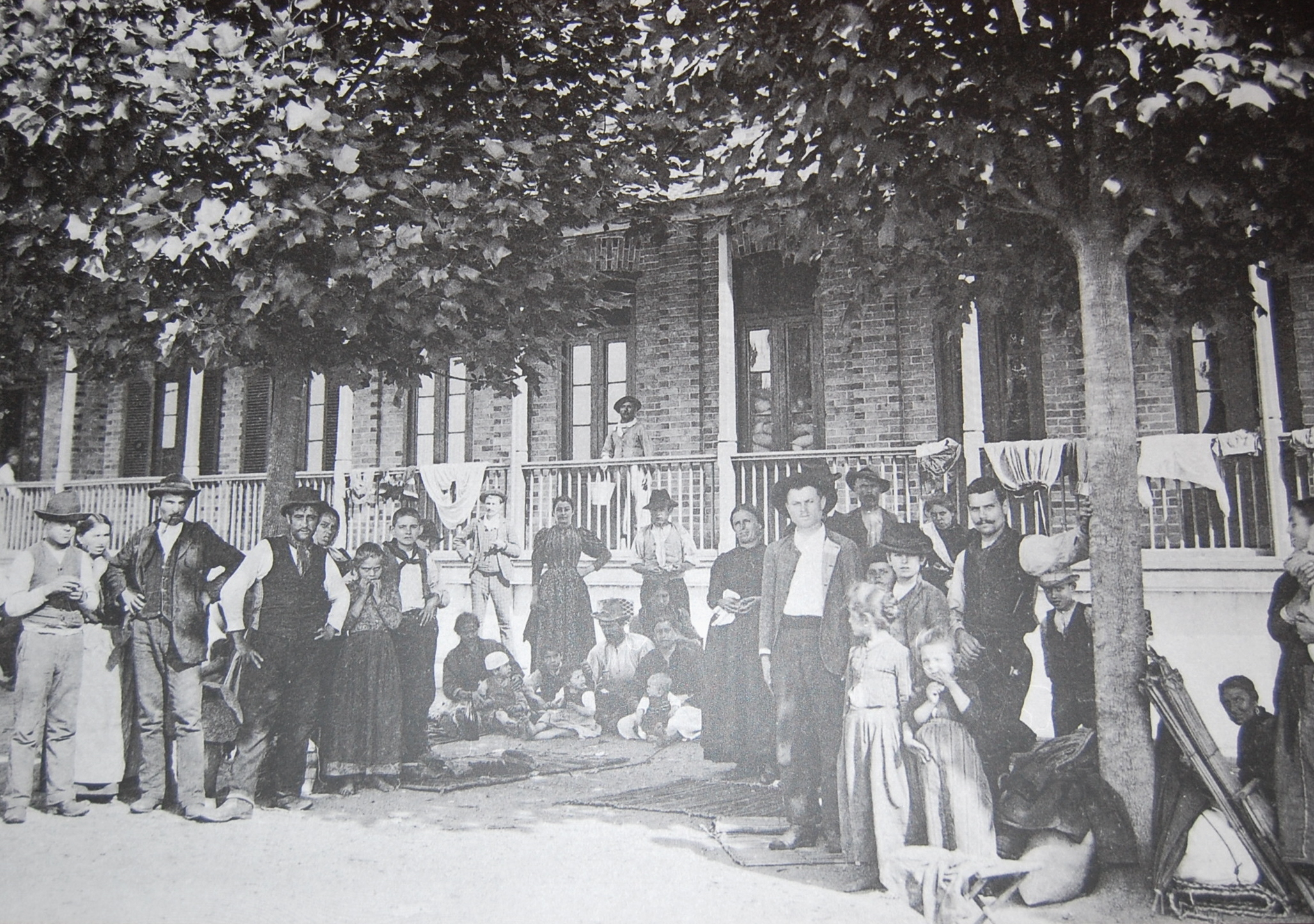
Italian immigrants arriving in São Paulo (c. 1890)

Despite the high numbers of immigrants leaving the country, most Italians remained in Brazil. Most of the immigrants remained only one year working on coffee farms and then left the plantations. A few earned enough money to buy their own lands and became farmers themselves. However, most migrated to Brazilian cities. Many Italians worked in factories (in 1901, 81% of the São Paulo's factory workers were Italians). In Rio de Janeiro, many the factory workers were Italians. In São Paulo, those workers established themselves in the center of the city, living in cortiços (degraded multifamily row houses). The agglomerations of Italians in cities gave birth to typically Italian neighborhoods, such as Mooca, which is until today linked to its Italian past. Other Italians became traders, mostly itinerant traders, selling their products in different regions.

A common presence on the streets of São Paulo were the Italian boys working as newspaper boys, as an Italian traveler observed: "In the crowd, we can see many Italian boys, shabby and barefoot, selling the newspapers from the city and from Rio de Janeiro, bothering the passersby with their offerings and their shouting of street roguish."

Despite the poverty and even semi-slavery conditions faced by many Italians in Brazil, most of the population achieved some personal success and changed their lower-class situation. Even though most of the first generation of immigrants still lived in poverty, their children, born in Brazil, often changed their social status as they diversified their field of work, leaving the poor conditions of their parents and often becoming part of the local elite.

== Assimilation ==
Except for some isolated cases of violence between Brazilians and Italians, especially between 1892 and 1896, integration in Brazil was quick and peaceful. For Italians in São Paulo, scholars suggest that assimilation occurred within two generations. Research suggests that even first-generation immigrants born in Italy soon became assimilated in the new country. Even in Southern Brazil, where most of the Italians were living in isolated rural communities, with little contact with Brazilians, which kept the Italian patriarchal family structure, and therefore the father chose the wife or husband for their children, giving preference to Italians, assimilation was also quick.

According to the 1940 census in Rio Grande do Sul, 393,934 people reported to speak German as their first language (11.86% of the state's population). In comparison, 295,995 reported to speak Italian, mostly dialects (8.91% of the state's population). Even though Italian immigration was larger and more recent than German immigration, the Italian group tended to be more easily assimilated due to the Latin cultural link. In the 1950 Census, the number of people in Rio Grande do Sul who reported to speak Italian dropped to 190,376.

In São Paulo, where more Italians settled, in the 1940 census 28,910 Italian-born people reported to speak Italian at home (only 13.6% of the state's Italian population). In comparison, 49.1% of the immigrants of other nationalities reported to keep speaking their native languages at home (with the exception of Portuguese). Thus, the prohibition of speaking Italian, German, and Japanese during World War II was not so serious to the Italian community as it was to the other two groups.

A major measure of the government occurred in 1889, when Brazilian citizenship was granted to all immigrants, but the act had little influence on their identity or assimilation process. Both the Italian newspapers in Brazil and the Italian government were uncomfortable with the assimilation of Italians in the country, which occurred mostly after the Great Naturalization period. Italian institutions encouraged the entry of Italians in Brazilian politics, but the presence of immigrants was initially small. Italian dialects came to dominate the streets of São Paulo and in some Southern localities. Over time, languages based on Italian dialects tended to disappear, and their presence is now small.

At first, especially in rural Southern Brazil, Italians tended to marry only other Italians. Over time and with the decrease of more immigrants arriving, in Southern Brazil they started to integrate themselves with Brazilians. About Italians in Santa Catarina, the Italian consul asserted:

The marriage between an Italian man and a Brazilian woman, between an Italian woman and a Brazilian man is very common, and it would be even more frequent if the majority of the Italians were not living segregated on the countryside.

There is little information about this trend, but it was noticed a large process of integration since World War I. However, some more closed members of the Italian community saw this integration process as negative. Indigenous peoples in Brazil were often treated as savages, and conflicts between Italians and Indigenous peoples for the occupation of lands in Southern Brazil were common.

== Prosperity ==
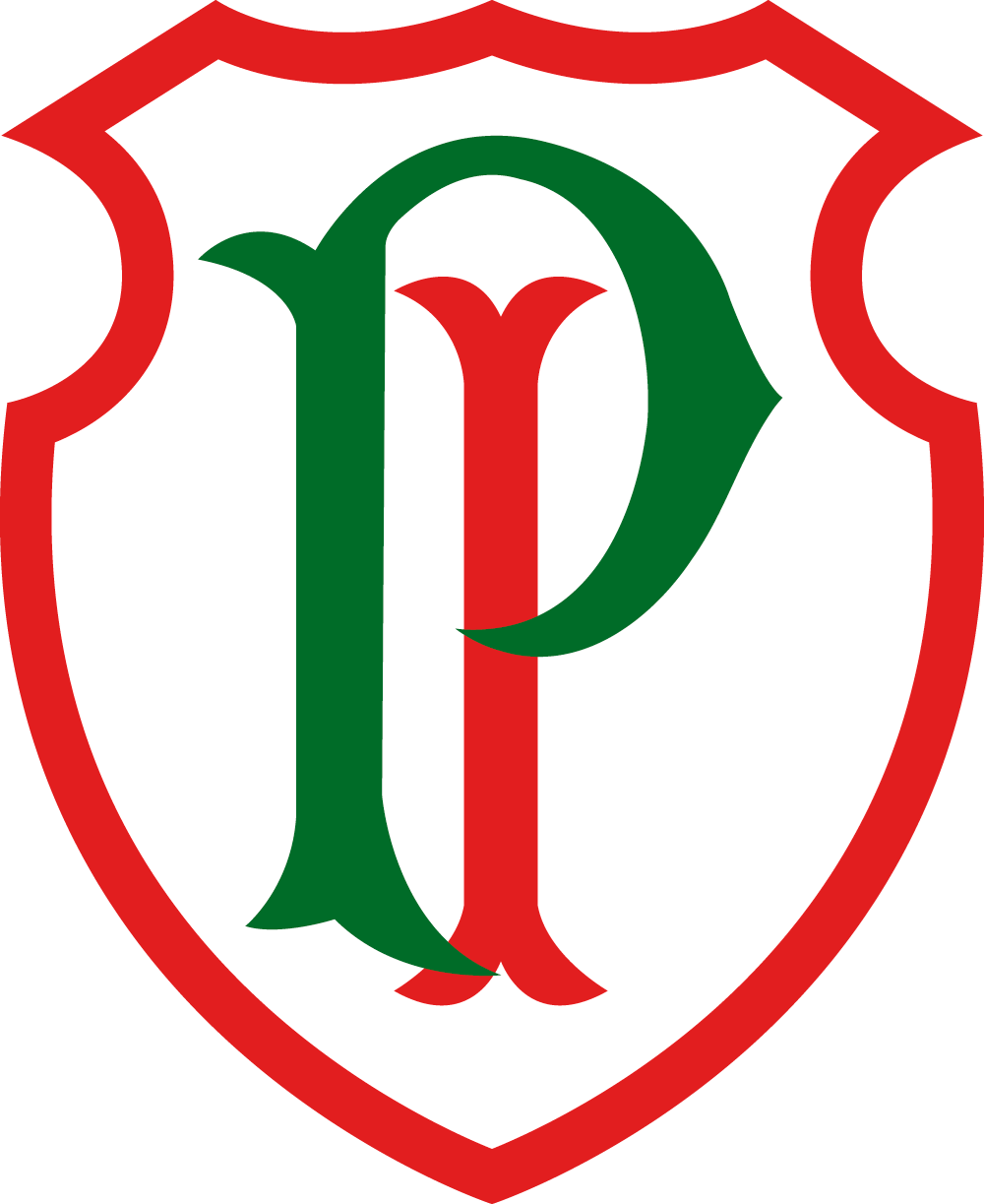
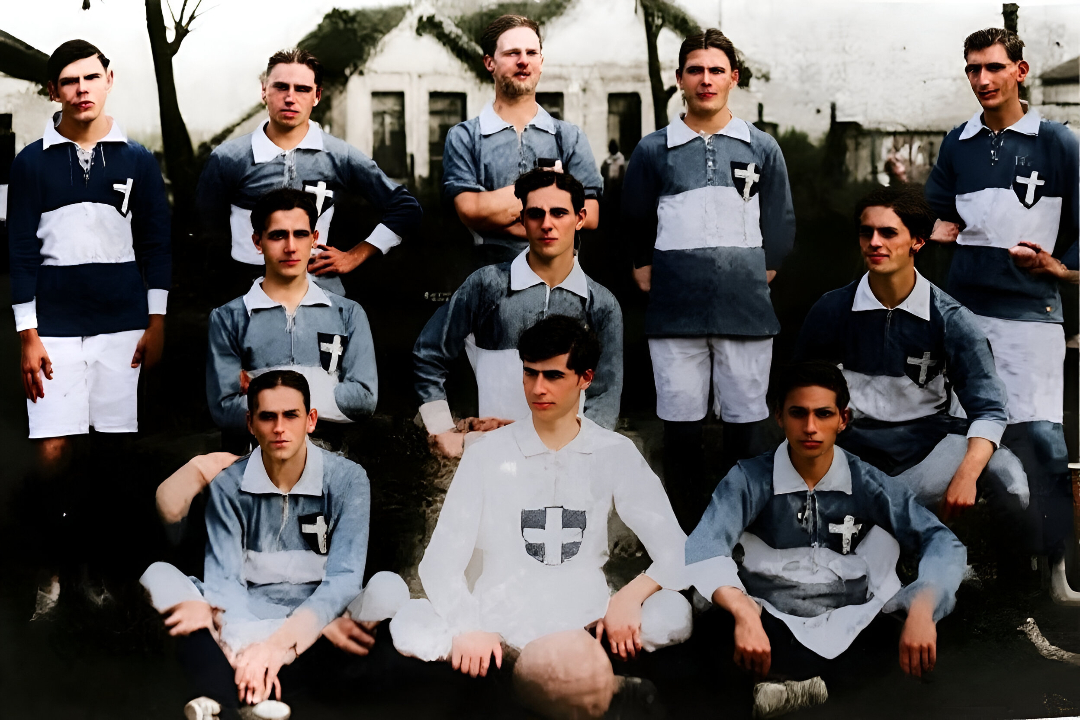
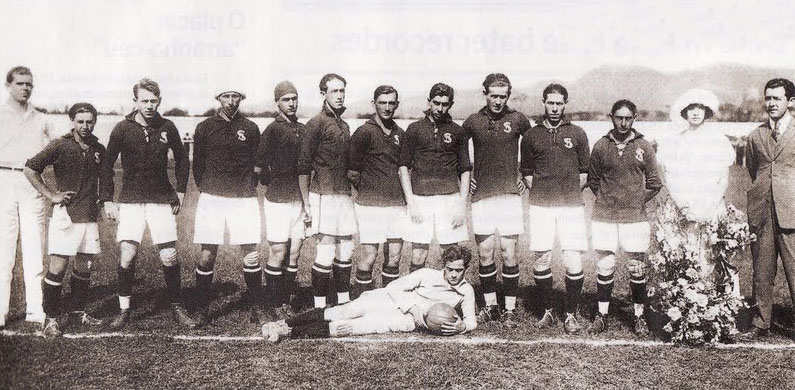
Clockwise from top:
- A Palestra Italia club crest, (São Carlos)
- Palestra Italia (São Paulo), now Palmeiras, in 1916
- Societá Sportiva Palestra Itália (Belo Horizonte), now Cruzeiro, in 1923

Historically, Italians have been divided into two groups in Brazil. Those in Southern Brazil lived in rural colonies in contact with mostly other people of Italian descent. However, those in Southeast Brazil, the most populated region of the country, integrated into Brazilian society quite quickly.

After some years working in coffee plantations, some immigrants earned enough money to buy their own land and become farmers themselves. Others left the rural areas and moved to cities, mainly São Paulo, Campinas, São Carlos and Ribeirão Preto. A very few became very rich in the process and attracted more Italian immigrants. In the early 20th century, São Paulo became known as the City of the Italians, because 31% of its inhabitants were of Italian nationality in 1900. The city of São Paulo had the second-highest population of people with Italian ancestry in the world at this time, after only Rome. In Campinas, street signs in Italian were common, a large commercial and services sector owned by Italian Brazilians developed, and more than 60% of the population had Italian surnames.

Italian immigrants were very important to the development of many big cities in Brazil, such as São Paulo, Porto Alegre, Curitiba and Belo Horizonte. Bad conditions in rural areas made thousands of Italians move there. Most of them became laborers and participated actively in the industrialization of Brazil in the early 20th century. Others became investors, bankers and industrialists, such as Count Matarazzo, whose family became the richest industrialists in São Paulo by holding more than 200 industries and businesses. In Rio Grande do Sul, 42% of the industrial companies have Italians roots.

Italians and their descendants were also quick to organize themselves and establish mutual aid societies (such as the Circolo Italiano), hospitals, schools (such as the Istituto Colégio Dante Alighieri, in São Paulo), labor unions, newspapers as Il Piccolo from Mooca and Fanfulla (for the whole city of São Paulo), magazines, radio stations and association football teams such as: Clube Atlético Votorantim, the old Sport Club Savóia from Sorocaba, Clube Atlético Juventus of Italians Brazilians from Mooca (old worker quarter from city of São Paulo), Esporte Clube Juventude and the great clubs (which had the same name) Palestra Italia, later renamed to Sociedade Esportiva Palmeiras in São Paulo and Cruzeiro Esporte Clube in Belo Horizonte.

Industries
	1907	1920
Brazil	2.258	13.336
Owned by Italians	398 (17,6%)	2.119 (15,9%)

Owners of 204 largest industries in São Paulo (1962)
Generation	Percentage
Immigrant	49,5%
Son of an immigrant	23,5%
Brazilian (more than 3 generations)	15,7%
Grandson of an immigrant	11,3%
Ethnic origin	Percentage
Italians	34,8%
Brazilians	15,7%
Portuguese	11,7%
Germans	10,3%
Syrians and Lebanese	9,0%
Russians	2,9%
Austrians	2,4%
Swiss	2,4%
Other Europeans	9,1%
Others	2,0%

Industries owned by an Italian
State	1907	1920
São Paulo	120	1,446
Minas Gerais	111	149
Rio Grande do Sul	50	227
Rio de Janeiro (city + state)	42	89
Paraná	31	61
Santa Catarina	13	56
Bahia	8	44
Amazonas	5	5
Pará	5	10
Pernambuco	3	3
Paraíba	2	4
Espírito Santo	1	18
Mato Grosso	1	3
Other states	5	4

== Characteristics of Italian immigration in Brazil ==
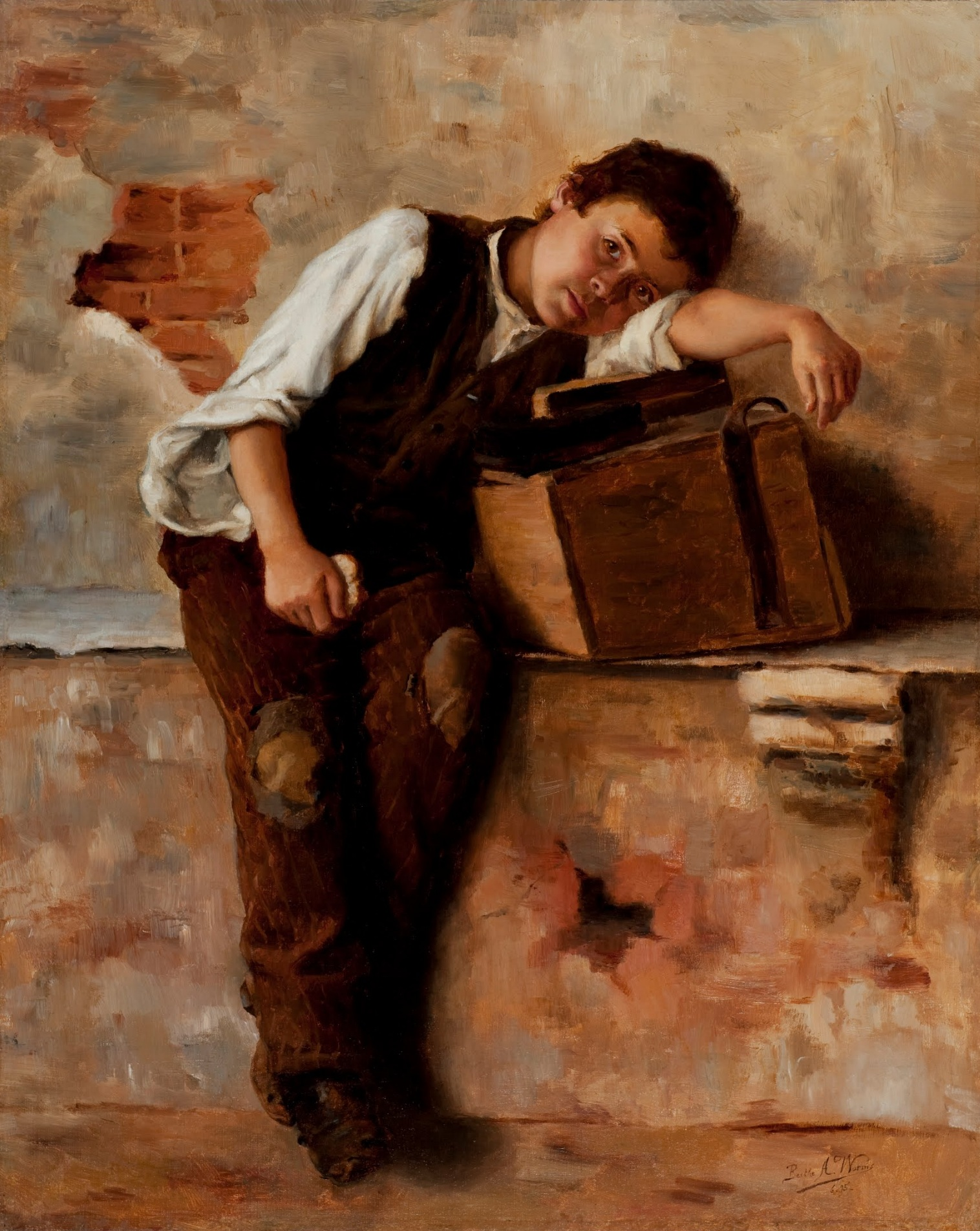
Saudades de Nápoles (1895) (Missing Naples). Painting by Bertha Worms (Pinacoteca do Estado de São Paulo, São Paulo).

Italian immigration to Brazil (1876–1920)
Region of origin	Number of immigrants	Region of origin	Number of immigrants
Veneto (North)	365,710	Sicily (South)	44,390
Campania (South)	166,080	Piedmont (North)	40,336
Calabria (South)	113,155	Apulia (South)	34,833
Lombardy (North)	105,973	Marche (Center)	25,074
Abruzzo-Molise (South)	93,020	Lazio (Center)	15,982
Tuscany (Center)	81,056	Umbria (Center)	11,818
Emilia-Romagna (North)	59,877	Liguria (North)	9,328
Basilicata (South)	52,888	Sardinia (South)	6,113
Total : 1,243,633

=== Areas of origin ===
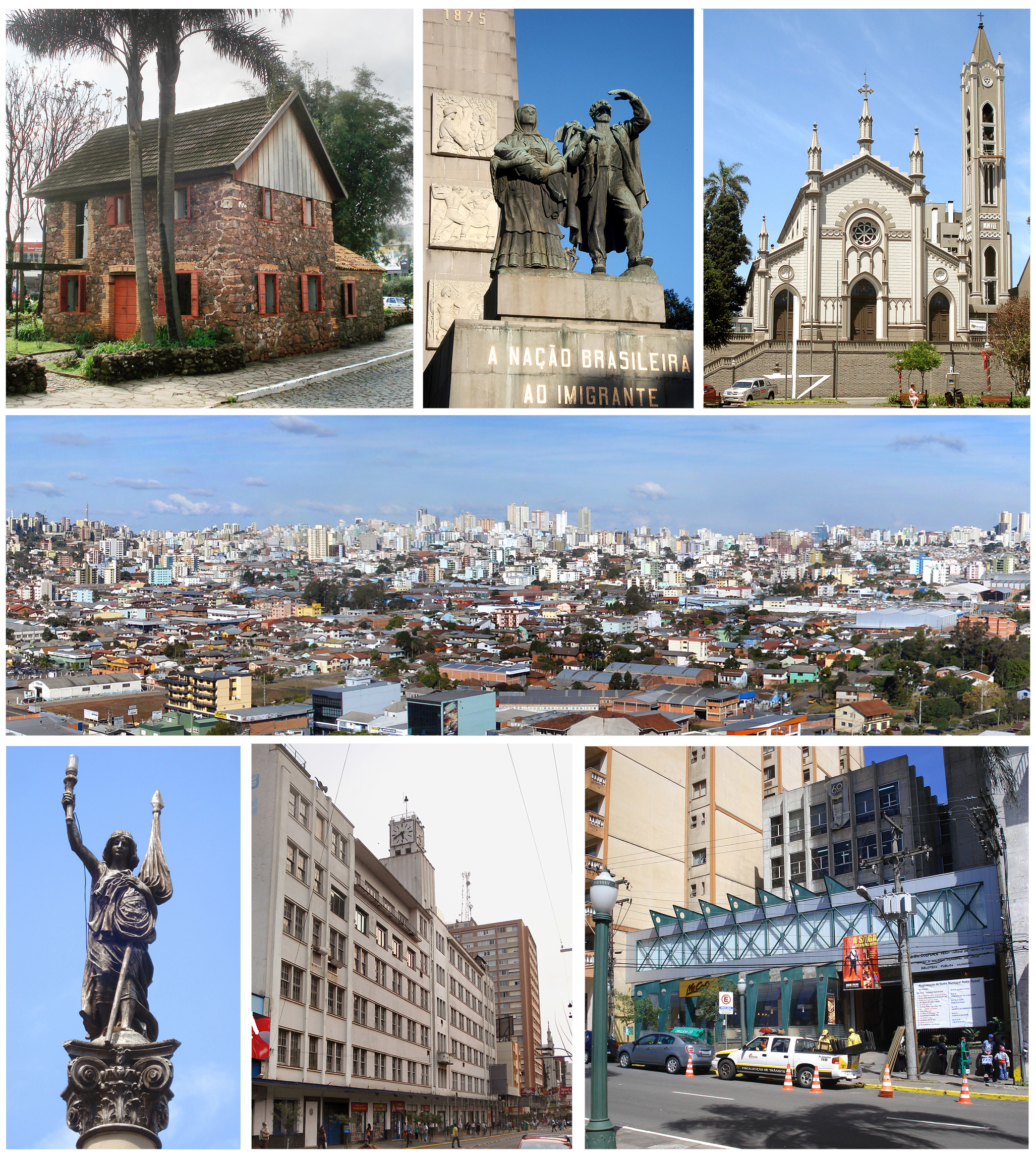
Pictures of Caxias do Sul. The city was established by Italian immigrants, mostly farmers from the Veneto.

Most of the Italian immigrants to Brazil came from Northern Italy; however, they were not distributed homogeneously among the extensive Brazilian regions. In the State of São Paulo, the Italian community was more diverse including a large number of people from the South and the Center of Italy. Even today, 42% of the Italians in Brazil came from Northern Italy, 36% from Central Italy regions, and only 22% from Southern Italy. Brazil is the only American country with a large Italian community in which Southern Italian immigrants are a minority.

In the first decades, the vast majority of the immigrants came from the North. Since Southern Brazil received most of the early settlers, the vast majority of its immigrants came from the extreme North of Italy, mainly from Veneto and particularly from the provinces of Vicenza (32%), Belluno (30%) and Treviso (24%). In Rio Grande do Sul, many came from Cremona, Mantua, from parts of Brescia, and also from Bergamo, in the region of Lombardy, close to Veneto. The regions of Trentino and of Friuli-Venezia Giulia also sent many immigrants to the South of Brazil. Of the immigrants in Rio Grande do Sul, 54% came from the Veneto, 33% from Lombardy, 7% from Trentino, 4.5% from Friuli-Venezia Giulia and only 1.5% from other parts of Italy.

From the early 20th century, the agrarian crisis started to affect Southern Italy as well, and many people immigrated to Brazil, mostly to the state of São Paulo, since it needed workers to embrace the coffee plantations. The Italian immigrants in São Paulo came from mostly Veneto, Calabria, Campania. After the end of World War II, a small number of Istrian Italians and Dalmatian Italians emigrated to Brazil during the Istrian-Dalmatian exodus, leaving their homelands, which were lost to Italy and annexed to Yugoslavia after the Treaty of Peace with Italy, 1947.

Italian immigration to Brazil (1870–1959)
Italian Region	Percentage
North	53.7%
South	32.0%
Centre	14.5%

Regional origins of Italian immigrants to Brazil (1870–1959)
Region	Percentage
Veneto	26.6%
Campania	12.1%
Calabria	8.2%
Lombardy	7.7%
Tuscany	5.9%
Friuli-Venezia Giulia	5.8%
Trentino-Alto Adige/Südtirol	5.3%
Abruzzo	5.0%
Emilia-Romagna	4.3%
Basilicata	3.8%
Sicily	3.2%
Piedmont	2.8%
Apulia	2.5%
Marche	1.8%
Molise	1.8%
Lazio	1.1%
Umbria	0.8%
Liguria	0.7%
Sardinia	0.4%
Aosta Valley	0.2%

Main group of Italians immigrants living in São Paulo State (1936)
Region	Population
Veneto	228,142
Campania	91,960
Calabria	72,686
Lombardy	51,338
Tuscany	47,874

Main groups of Italians in some neighborhoods in São Paulo
Region	Neighborhood
Calabria	Bixiga
Campania and Apulia	Brás
Veneto	Bom Retiro

== Italian influences in Brazil ==
=== Language ===
The Italian is more heard in São Paulo than in Turin, Milan or Naples, because while between us the dialects are spoken, in São Paulo all dialects merge under the Venetians' and Toscans' influx, who are the majority, and the natives adopted the Italian as an official language.

— Gina Lombroso, Italian traveler in São Paulo (1908)

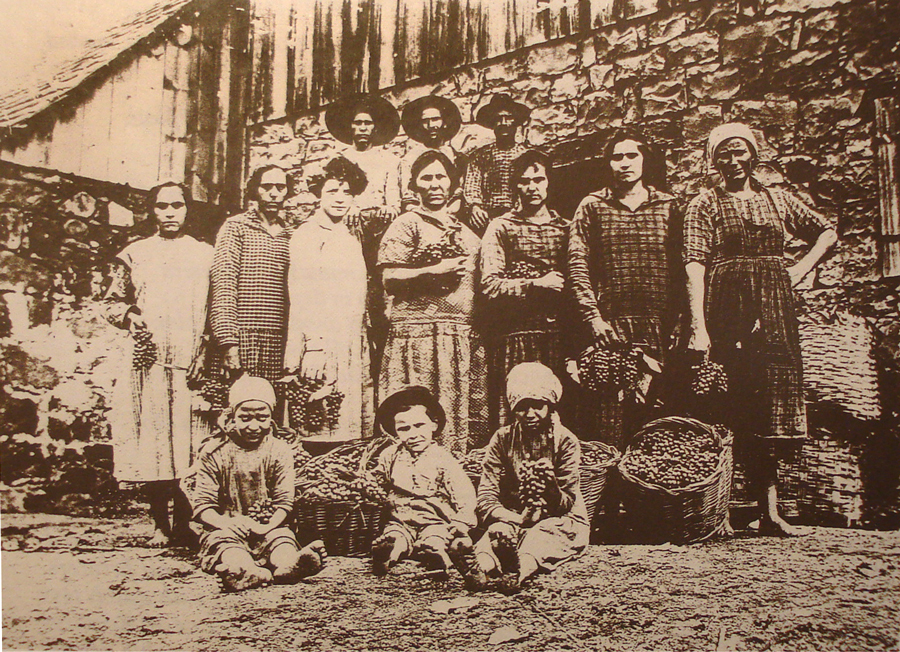
Italian people in Serra Gaúcha

Most Brazilians with Italian ancestry now speak Brazilian Portuguese as their native language. During World War II, the public use of Italian, German, and Japanese was forbidden.

Italian dialects have influenced the Portuguese spoken in some areas of Brazil. Italian was so widespread in São Paulo that the Portuguese traveler Sousa Pinto said that he could not speak with cart drivers in Portuguese because they all spoke Italian dialects and gesticulated as Neapolitans.

The Italian influence on Portuguese spoken in São Paulo is no longer as great as before, but the accent of the city's inhabitants still has some traces of the Italian accents common in the beginning of the 20th century like the intonation and such expressions as Belo, Ma vá!, Orra meu! and Tá entendendo?. Other characteristic is the difficulty to speak Portuguese in plural, saying plural words as they were singulars. The lexical influence of Italian on Brazilian Portuguese, however, has remained quite small.

A similar phenomenon occurred in the countryside of Rio Grande do Sul but encompassing almost exclusively those of Italian origin. On the other hand, is a different phenomenon: Talian, which emerged mostly in the northeastern part of the state (Serra Gaúcha). Talian is a variant of the Venetian language with influences from other Italian dialects and Portuguese. In Southern Brazilian rural areas marked by bilingualism, even among the monolingual Portuguese-speaking population, the Italian-influenced accent is fairly typical.

=== Music ===
The Italian influence in Brazil affects also music with traditional Italian songs and the merging with other Brazilians music styles. One of the main results of the fusion is samba paulista, a samba with strong Italians influence.

Samba paulista was created by Adoniran Barbosa (born João Rubinato), the son of Italians immigrants. His songs translated the life of the Italian neighborhoods in São Paulo and merged São Paulo dialect with samba, which latter made him known as the "people's poet."

One of the main example is Samba Italiano, which that has a Brazilian rhythm and theme but (mostly) Italian lyrics. Below, the lyrics of this song have the parts in (mangled) Portuguese in bold and the parts in Italian in a normal font:

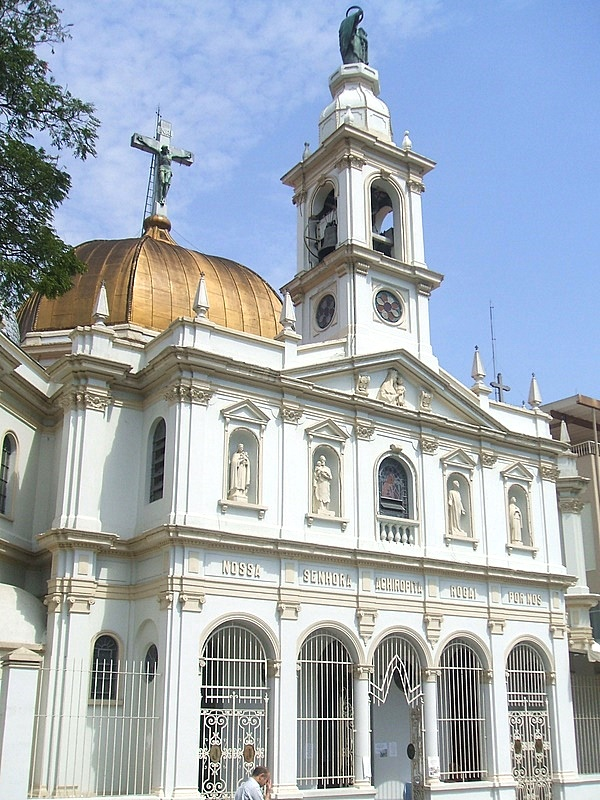
The Church of Our Lady of Achiropita in Bixiga. The feast in honor of the Lady happens in August since 1926.

**Original in São Paulo's pidgin**

Gioconda, piccina mia,
**Vai brincar ali no** mare **í no fundo**,
**Mas** attenzione **co os tubarone, ouviste**
Capito, **meu** San **Benedito**?

Piove, piove,
Fa tempo che piove qua, Gigi,
E io, sempre io,
Sotto la tua finestra
E voi senza **mi** sentire
Ridere, ridere, ridere
Di questo infelice qui

Ti ricordi, Gioconda,
Di quella sera in **Guarujá**
Quando il mare ti portava via
E mi chiamasti
Aiuto, Marcello!
La tua Gioconda ha paura di quest'onda

**Free translation to English**

Gioconda, my little
Go frolicking there, deep into the sea
But pay attention to the sharks, do you hear
Understood, my Saint Benedict?

It rains, it rains
It has rained for a long time here, Gigi
And I, always I
Under your window
And you, without hearing me
Laughing, laughing and laughing
Of this unhappy one here

Do you remember, Gioconda
That afternoon in Guarujá
When the sea took you away
And you called for me:
Help, Marcello!
Your Gioconda is afraid of this wave

=== Cuisine ===
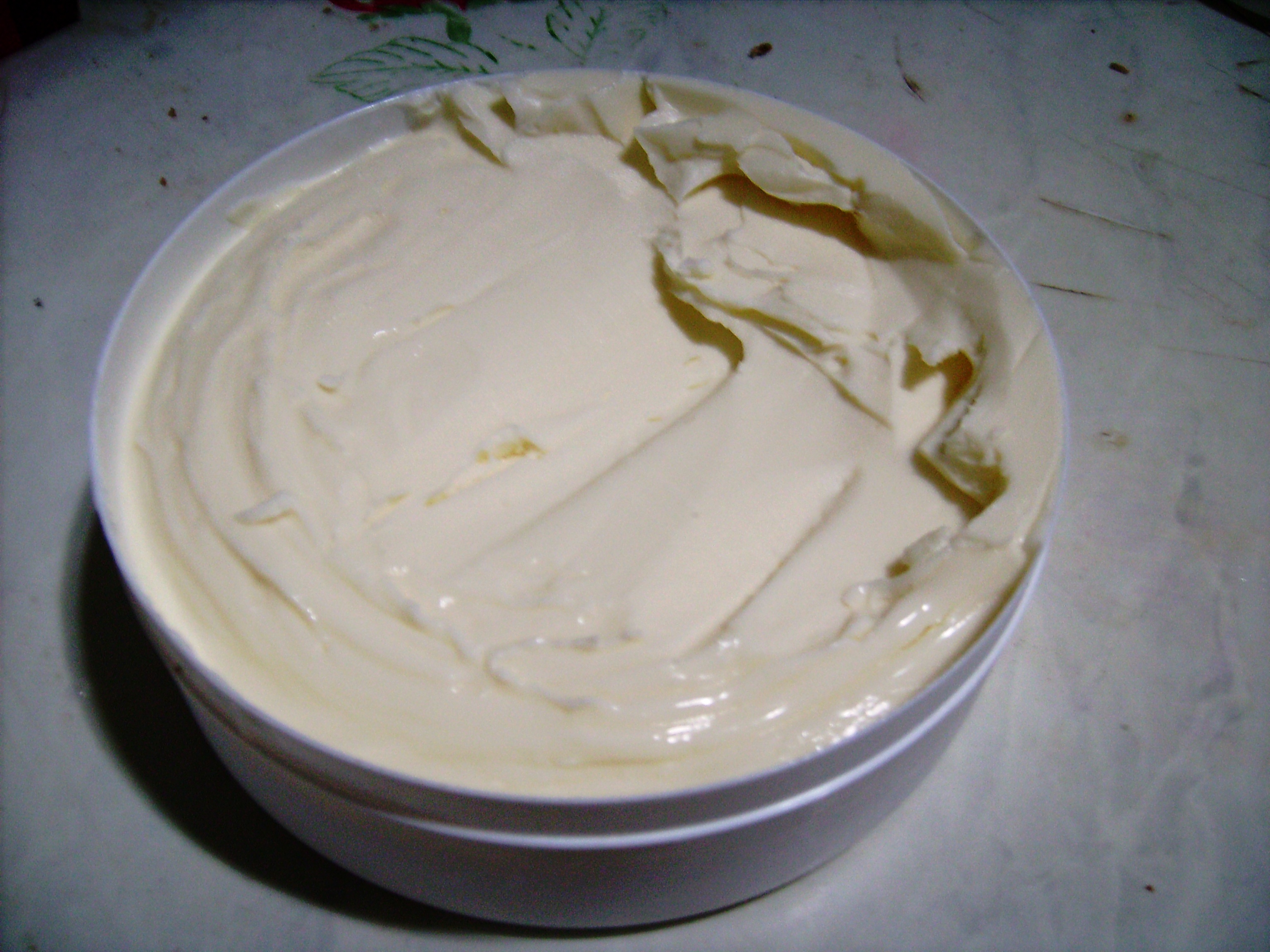
Catupiry, a Brazilian cheese developed by the Italian immigrant Mario Silvestrini in 1911

Italians brought new recipes and types of food to Brazil and also helped in the development of the cuisine of Brazil. Italian staple dishes like pizza and pasta are very common and popular in Brazil. Pasta is extremely common, either simple unadorned pasta with butter or oil or accompanied by a tomato- or bechamel-based sauce.

Aside from the typical Italian cuisine like pizza, pasta, risotto, panettone, milanesa, polenta, calzone, and ossobuco, Italians helped to create new dishes that today are typically considered Brazilian. Galeto (from the Italian galletto, little rooster), frango com polenta (chicken with fried polenta), Bife à parmegiana (a steak prepared with Parmigiano-Reggiano), Mortadella sandwich (a sandwich made of mortadella sausage, Provolone cheese, sourdough bread, mayonnaise and Dijon mustard), Catupiry cheese, new types of sausage like linguiça Calabresa and linguiça Toscana (literally Calabrian and Tuscan sausage), chocotone (panettone with chocolate chips) and many other recipes were created or influenced by the Italian community.

The nhoque de 29 ("gnocchi of 29") defines the widespread custom in some South American countries of eating a plate of gnocchi, a type of Italian pasta, on the 29th of each month. The custom is widespread especially in the states of the Southern Cone such as Brazil, Argentina, Paraguay, Uruguay; these countries being recipients of a considerable Italian immigration between the end of the 19th century and the beginning of the 20th century. There is a ritual that accompanies lunch with gnocchi, namely putting money under the plate which symbolizes the desire for new gifts. It is also customary to leave a banknote or coin under the plate to attract luck and prosperity to the dinner.

The tradition of serving gnocchi on the 29th of each month stems from a legend based on the story of Saint Pantaleon, a young doctor from Nicomedia who, after converting to Christianity, made a pilgrimage through northern Italy. There Pantaleon practiced miraculous cures for which he was canonized. According to legend, on one occasion when he asked Venetian peasants for bread, they invited him to share their poor table. In gratitude, Pantaleon announced a year of excellent fishing and excellent harvests. That episode occurred on 29 July, and for this reason that day is remembered with a simple meal represented by gnocchi.

=== Other influences ===
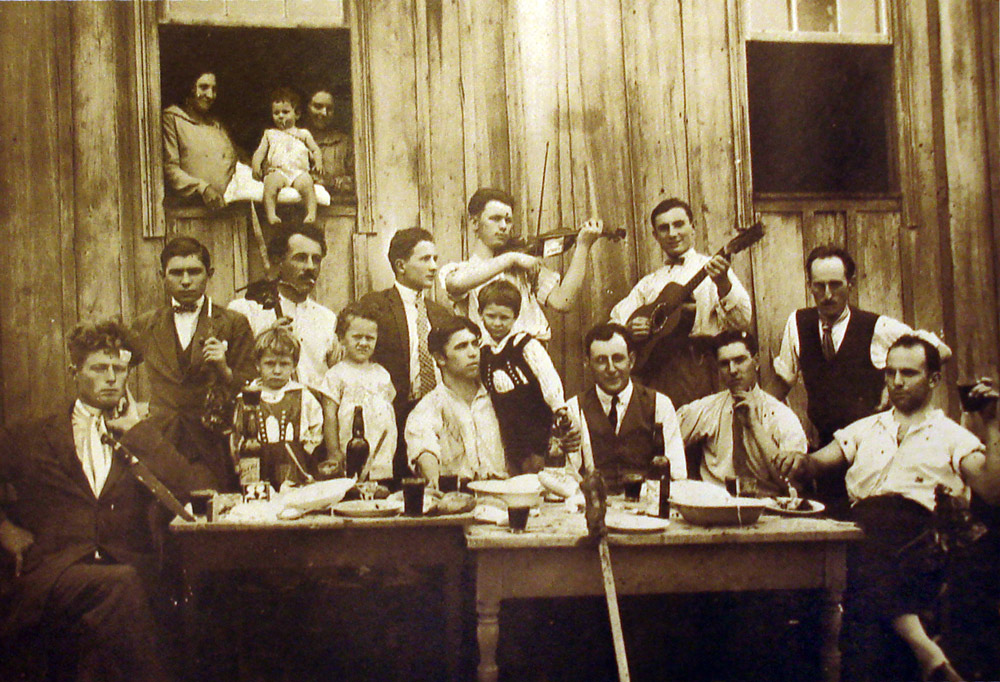
The Italian-Brazilian Benvenutti family in 1928

- Use of ciao ("tchau" in Brazilian-Portuguese) as a 'goodbye' salutation (all of Brazil)
- Wine production (in the South)
- 218 loanwords (italianisms), such as agnolotti, rigatoni, sugo as regards gastronomy, ambasciata, cittadella, finta as regards sport, lotteria, tombola as regards games, raviolatrice, vasca as regards technology and stiva as regards the navy.
- Early introduction of more advanced low-scale farming techniques (Minas Gerais, São Paulo and all Southern Brazil)

== Education ==
Italian international schools in Brazil:

- Scuola Italiana Eugenio Montale - São Paulo
- Istituto Italo-Brasiliano Biculturale Fondazione Torino - Belo Horizonte

== Current Italian emigration in Brazil ==
In 2019, 11,663 people with Italian nationality emigrated from Italy to Brazil according to the Italian World Report 2019, totaling 447,067 Italian citizens living in Brazil until 2019.

== Notable people ==
=== Arts and Entertainment ===
- Bruna Abdullah, Brazilian actress
- Lélia Abramo, Italian-Brazilian actress
- André Abujamra, Brazilian score composer, musician, singer, actor and comedian
- Fernanda Andrade, Brazilian actress, model and singer
- Itamar Assumpção, Brazilian singer-songwriter
- Morena Baccarin, Brazilian-born American actress
- Adoniran Barbosa, Brazilian São Paulo style samba singer and composer
- Rolando Boldrin, Brazilian television presenter, actor and singer
- Sérgio Britto, Brazilian actor and director
- Antonio Calloni, Brazilian actor
- Celly Campello, Brazilian singer and a pioneer in Brazilian rock
- Vicente Celestino, Brazilian singer, composer and actor
- Edson Celulari, Brazilian actor
- Radamés Gnatalli, Brazilian composer, pianist and conductor
- Gianfrancesco Guarnieri, Italian-Brazilian actor, lyricist, poet and playwright
- Rita Lee, Brazilian singer, songwriter, author, actress and television host
- Anitta Malfatti, Brazilian painter, draughtswoman, engraver, illustrator and teacher
- Selton Mello, Brazilian actor
- Francisco Mignone, Brazilian composer
- Menotti del Picchia, Brazilian poet, journalist and painter
- Décio Pignatari, Brazilian poet and essayist
- Cândido Portinari, Brazilian painter
- Zizi Possi, Brazilian singer
- Cláudia Raia, Brazilian actress
- Ítalo Rossi, Brazilian actor
- Rodrigo Santoro, Brazilian actor
- Deborah Secco, Brazilian actress
- Luisa Sonza, Brazilian singer-songwriter
- Ary Toledo, Brazilian humorist
- Paula Toller, Brazilian singer-songwriter
- Toquinho, Brazilian guitarist and singer
- Ísis Valverde, Brazilian actress

=== Politics and Economists ===
- Roger Agnelli, Brazilian investment banker and entrepreneur
- Carlos Bolsonaro (born 1982), Brazilian politician, Jair Bolsonaro's son
- Eduardo Bolsonaro (born 1984), Brazilian lawyer, federal police officer and politician; Jair Bolsonaro's son
- Flávio Bolsonaro (born 1981), Brazilian lawyer, entrepreneur and politician; Jair Bolsonaro's son
- Jair Bolsonaro (born 1955), 38th President of Brazil
- Itamar Franco, Brazilian former politician, 33rd president of Brazil.
- Guido Mantega, Italian-born Brazilian economist and politician
- Count Francesco Matarazzo (1854–1937), Italian-born Brazilian industrialist and businessman
- Sergio Moro, Brazilian jurist, former federal judge, college professor and politician
- Romeu Zema, Brazilian businessman, administrator and politician

=== Religious people ===
- Geraldo Agnelo, Brazilian prelate

=== Royal family ===
- Dom Afonso, Prince Imperial and heir apparent to the throne of the Empire of Brazil

=== Sports (football) ===
- Adam Adami, professional footballer
- Alex Meschini, football coach and former footballer
- Andre Anderson, professional footballer
- Amphilóquio Guarisi, former national footballer
- Angelo Sormani, former national footballer
- Dino da Costa, former national footballer
- Éder, former national footballer
- Emerson Palmieri, Italian national team footballer
- Gabriel Martinelli, Brazilian national team footballer
- Jorginho, Italian national team footballer
- José Altafini, former national footballer
- Luiz Felipe, Italian national team footballer
- Otávio Fantoni, former national footballer
- Raphinha, Brazilian national team footballer
- Rafael Tolói, Italian national team footballer
- Thiago Motta, Italian football manager and former national footballer

=== Sports (bull riding) ===
- Guilherme Marchi, Brazilian bull rider

=== Sports (mixed martial arts) ===
- Tabatha Ricci, UFC fighter
- Diego Nunes

=== Sports (racing) ===
- Rubens Barrichello, former racing driver who competed in Formula One from 1993 to 2011
- Emerson Fittipaldi, former racing driver and motorsport executive, who competed in Formula One from 1970 to 1980
- Felipe Massa, racing driver who competed in Formula One from 2002 to 2017
- Ayrton Senna, F1 driver and philanthropist who competed in Formula One from 1984 to 1994

== See also ==
- Brazil–Italy relations
- Brazilians in Italy
- Italian Americans
- Italian Argentines
- Italian Australians
- Italian Canadians
- Italian Chileans
- Italian Colombians
- Italian Peruvians
- Italian Uruguayans
- Italo-Venezuelans
- Italian diaspora
- Italian immigration in Minas Gerais
- Demography of Brazil
- White Brazilians
- White Latin Americans
- List of Portuguese words of Italian origin
- Italian language in Brazil
- Memória do Bixiga Museum
