= Count Francesco Matarazzo =

Italian-born Brazilian businessman

Count Matarazzo
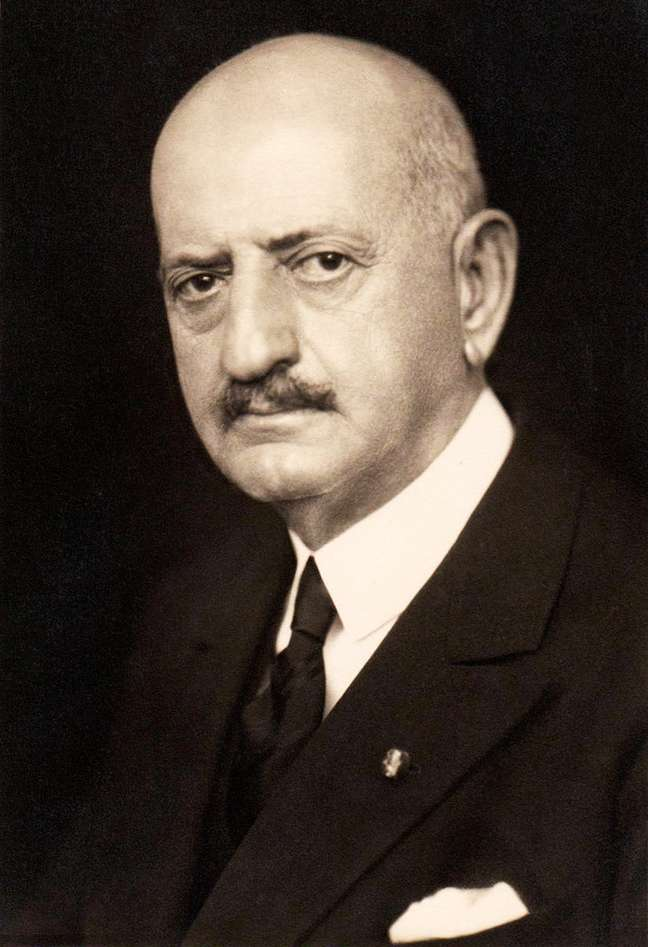
- Francesco Matarazzo

Personal details
- Born: Francesco Antonio Maria Matarazzo; 9 March 1854 Castellabate, Province of Salerno, Kingdom of the Two Sicilies
- Died: 10 December 1937 (aged 83) São Paulo, State of São Paulo, Brazil
- Spouse: Filomena Sansivieri
- Children: Giuseppe Matarazzo; Andrea Matarazzo; Ermelino Matarazzo; Teresa Comenale; Mariangela Comide; Attilio Matarazzo; Carmela Campostano; Lydia Pignatari; Olga, Princess Giovanni Alliata of Montereale; Ida Matarazzo; Claudia Ruspoli, Princess of Cerveteri; Francesco Matarazzo Jr. Luigi Matarazzo
- Parent(s): Costabile Matarazzo; Mariangela Jovane
- Occupation: Businessman

Francesco Antonio Maria Matarazzo, Count Matarazzo (9 March 1854 – 10 December 1937) was an Italian-born Brazilian industrialist and businessman who created a large business in South America, particularly in Brazil.

== Biography ==
He was born in Castellabate, Salerno, Kingdom of the Two Sicilies, the eldest of Doctor Costabile Matarazzo's nine sons, and Mariangela Jovane. At the age of 26, when Italian emigration to Brazil was widespread, he moved to the city of Sorocaba, São Paulo with his brothers, wife and children. Initially he sold oranges and lottery tickets and shined shoes, reinvesting the proceeds in new businesses, eventually including plantations of tea, coffee, corn, rice, rubber and cotton.

In 1890, he moved to the city of São Paulo and with his brothers, Giuseppe and Luigi, founded the company Matarazzo and Irmãos. He diversified its business and imported wheat flour from the United States. Giuseppe took part in the company with a lard factory in Porto Alegre and Luigi with a deposit-warehouse in São Paulo.

The following year the company was dissolved and replaced by Companhia Matarazzo S.A. with 43 minority shareholders. This corporation also controlled the factories in Sorocaba and Porto Alegre.

The outbreak of the Spanish-American War made it difficult to buy wheat flour and he obtained credit from the London and Brazilian Bank to build a mill in São Paulo. From there, his business expanded rapidly to a total of 365 factories throughout Brazil. The conglomerate became the fourth largest in the country and 6% of the population depended on its factories in São Paulo. The business was renamed Indústrias Reunidas Francisco Matarazzo (IRFM) in 1911.

The Gestapo spy Hans Wesemann reported that:

An entire fleet sails under his flag. Tens of thousands of workers toil in his factories. He makes cement, cuts down trees and turns the pulp into paper, on which he prints his newspapers. The public drinks his beer and watches films in his cinemas. He contrives to be both wealthy and popular and when the president of Brazil visits São Paulo, he calls upon Matarazzo first.

In recognition of his financial and material assistance to Italy during the First World War King Victor Emmanuel III granted him the title of Count.

Matarazzo died in 1937 after an attack of uremia. By the time of his death, his fortune was estimated at around 20 billion dollars (adjusting for recent values), making him Brazil's richest person.

== See also ==
- Matarazzo Building
- São Paulo Museum of Modern Art
