= Clube do Choro de Brasília =

Cultural association in Brasília, Brazil

Coordinates: 15°47′21″S 47°53′58″W

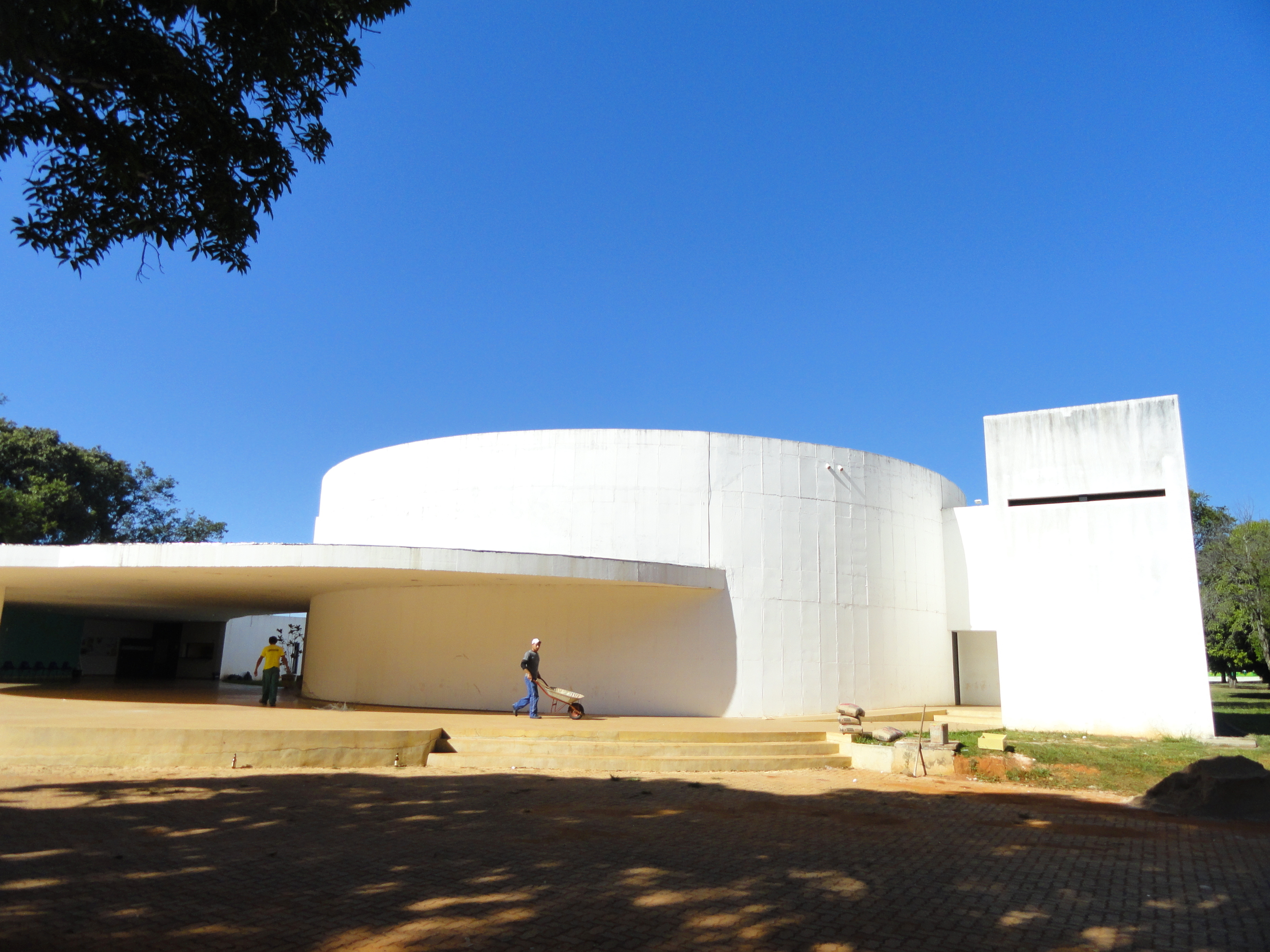
- O Espaço Cultural do Choro, sede do Clube.
- Interactive map of Clube do Choro de Brasília
- Address: Brasília; Brazil
- Location: Brasília, Federal District, Brazil
- Type: Cultural venue
- Events: Performances; Shows; Classes

Construction
- Opened: 9 September 1977 (Club Foundation); 10 November 2011 (Espaço Cultural do Choro)
- Architect: Oscar Niemeyer

Website
- clubedochoro.com.br (in portuguese)

The Clube de Choro de Brasília is an association dedicated to promoting and disseminating Choro. Located on the Monumental Axis, it is next to the Brasília Planetarium, and the Ulysses Guimarães Convention Center, whose cloakroom was transformed into the club's first headquarters. After years of neglect in the 1980s, the headquarters was revitalized and the club regained its relevance, with a new headquarters designed by Oscar Niemeyer completed in 2011.

In 2008, the Clube de Choro de Brasília was listed as intangible heritage of Brasília. It has held more than 2,500 shows, and its new headquarters, called Espaço Cultural do Choro, also houses the Raphael Rabello School of Choro, the first of its kind in Brazil.

== History ==
=== The influence of Jacob do Bandolim ===
After an episode in 1967 where he had been ill for four months and was recovered thanks to the intervention of two chorões - one of them a doctor, who had performed neural therapy learned in Germany - the famous chorão Jacob do Bandolim decided to leave Rio de Janeiro and go to the new Brazilian capital to continue his treatment there. During the six months he spent in Brasília, Jacob held soirées with local musicians, many of whom were civil servants who were also new residents of the city. This was the formation of the group that would later give rise to Clube de Choro, which became so famous that it performed for President Artur da Costa e Silva during the military dictatorship.

=== Club foundation ===
The Clube do Choro de Brasília was officially founded on September 9, 1977. The founding took place at a meeting at Odette Ernest Dia's home, with guitarist Avena de Castro becoming the first president. He was a friend of Jacob do Bandolim, and also present were the two musicians who helped Jacob recover in 1967, mandolinist Arnoldo Veloso, the doctor, and cavaquinho player Assis Carvalho. The group also included Pernambuco do Pandeiro, flutist Bide, Pixinguinha's cousin; trombonist Tio João and at least 23 other people, including instrumentalists, journalists, and enthusiasts.

=== Decadence ===
After an intense start and widespread repercussions, the Choro Club fell into decline in the 1980s. The club's structure in the old changing rooms of the Event Center was precarious, and musicians and enthusiasts suffered from equipment theft and a lack of physical infrastructure, which drove away the public and the chorões themselves. The place became a shelter for homeless people after more than a decade of neglect, and the club was threatened with eviction, at risk of losing its space, which, even though it was in poor condition and was a makeshift place, was the club's historic location.

=== Return and new club ===
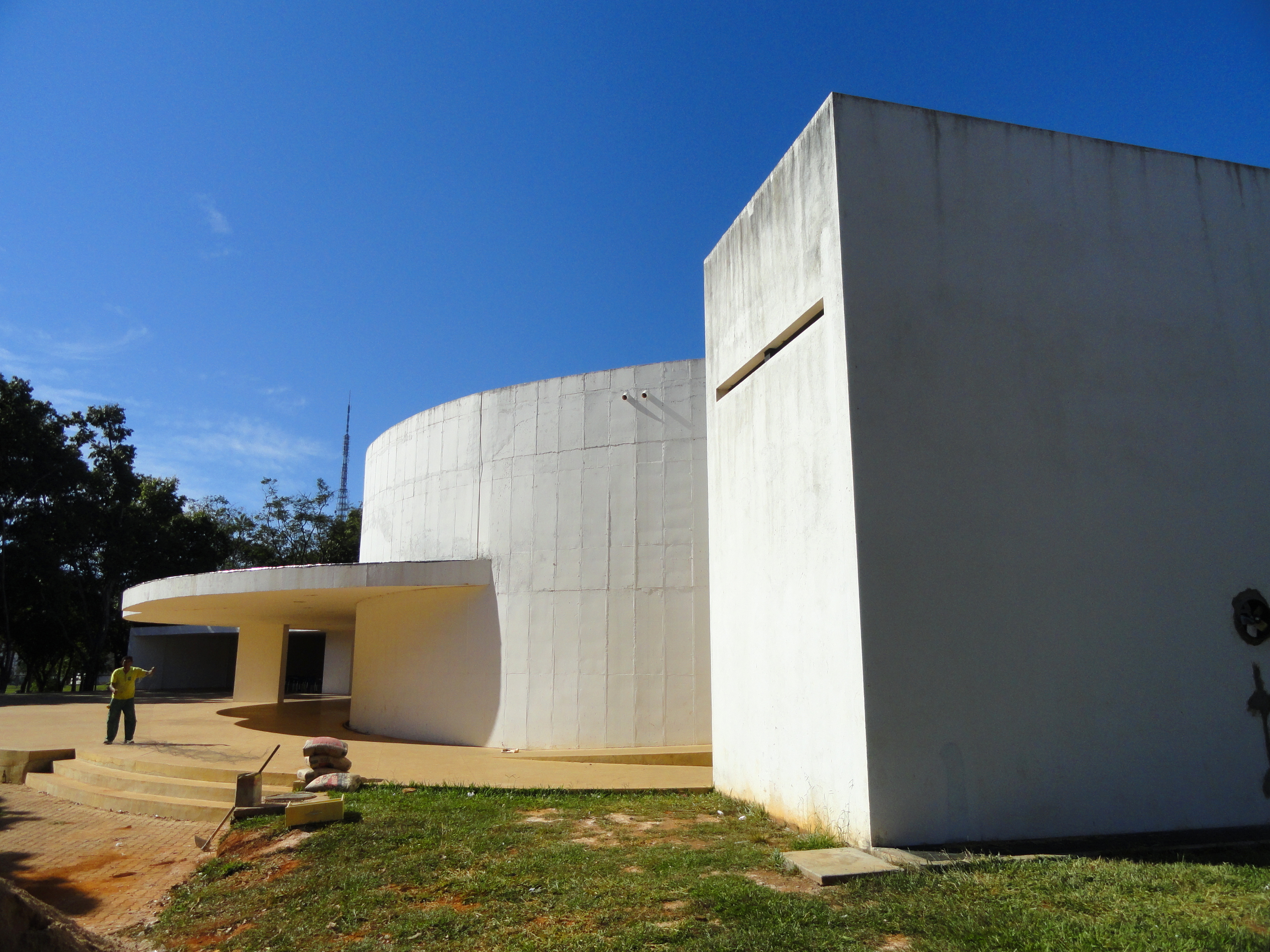
Clube do Choro

In 1993, a new board took over, led by Henrique Lima Santos Filho, known as Reco do Bandolim. The headquarters was regularized and the risk of eviction was averted. The next step was to renovate the space. To this end, a project designed by architect Fernando Andrade was carried out by the government. Artists contributed financially to the work, such as guitarist Raphael Rabello and mandolinist Armando Macedo, who held benefit concerts to help fund the revitalization of the Clube de Choro.

In 1997, the renovation was completed, and the new space began to attract more visitors. Cultural projects began to use the venue, and the club began to regain credibility, hosting shows and maintaining attractions at its renovated headquarters, such as permanent exhibitions. A partnership with the Raphael Rabello School of Choro was established, and the school began operating in the same location when a new building, designed by Oscar Niemeyer on the site of the original headquarters, was inaugurated. The work took about four years and was inaugurated on November 10, 2011, with the club finally leaving its temporary headquarters in favor of the permanent one. The location, headquarters of the club and the school, came to be called Espaço Cultural do Choro (Choro Cultural Space).

In 2008, the Choro Club was listed as Intangible Heritage of Brasília through Decree No. 28,995. The ceremony was attended by officials such as the governor of the Federal District, José Roberto Arruda, and the Minister of Education, Fernando Haddad.

=== Paul McCartney show ===
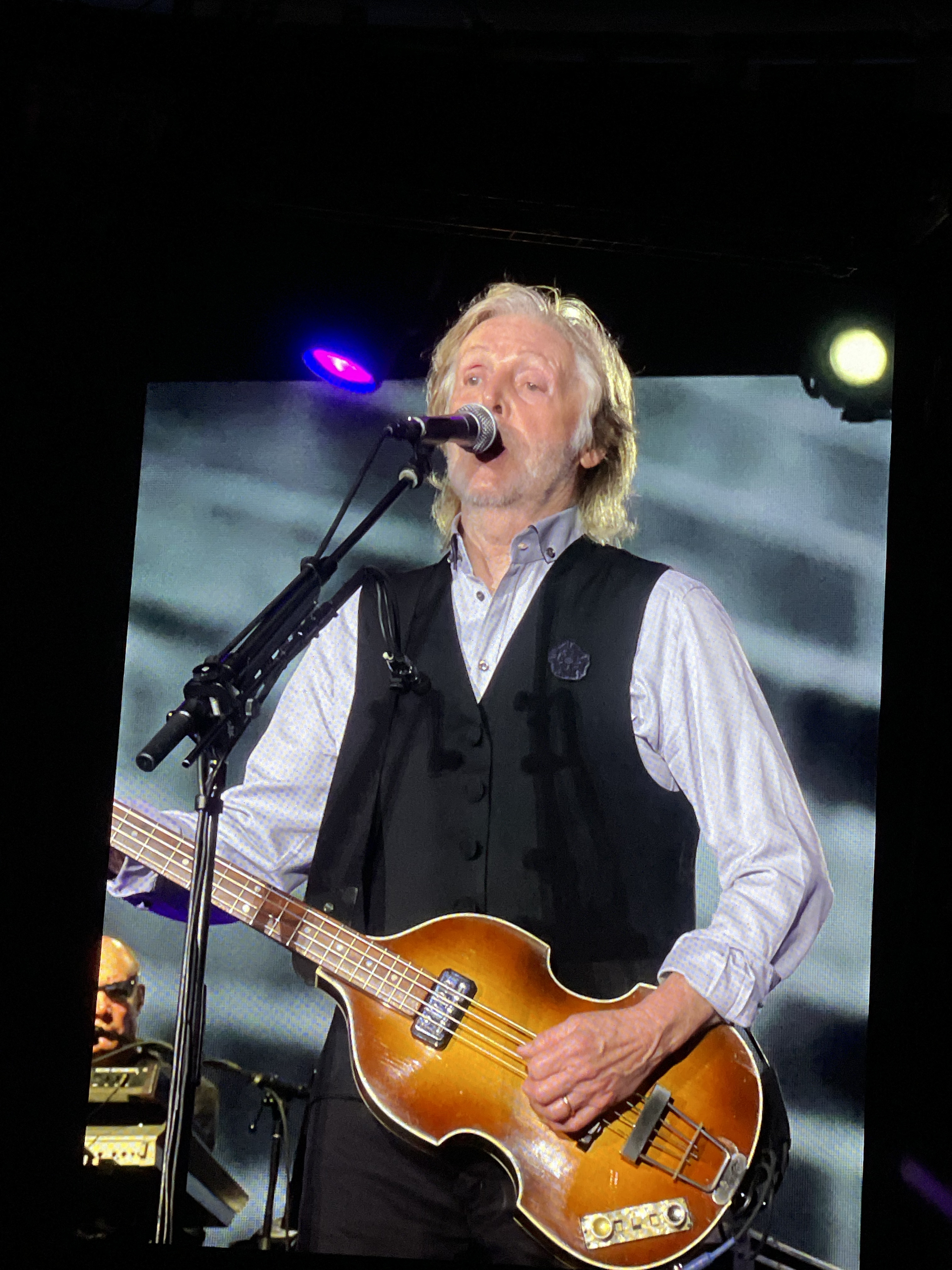
Paul McCartney performing at Clube do Choro

In 2023, Clube do Choro welcomed British musician Paul McCartney for a surprise concert. The event, marked by its surprise nature, was announced at 9 a.m. on the day of the performance, adding an extra element of excitement and unpredictability. The event, which attracted just over 500 spectators, had special significance, as the choice of Clube do Choro for the historic show in Brasília was influenced by the close relationship between the venue and the renowned Raphael Rabello School of Choro.

Paul McCartney, known for his appreciation of cultural institutions, recognizes the importance of supporting and encouraging smaller entities. In this context, 30 tickets were reserved for students of the Escola de Choro, along with 10 more for local professionals, reinforcing the musician's commitment to contributing to cultural development. The remaining tickets were made available to the general public.

Among those present were well-known figures from the Brazilian music scene, such as vocalist and guitarist Samuel Rosa (Skank) and drummer João Barone (Paralamas do Sucesso), highlighting the diversity and relevance of the event in the artistic scene.

== Structure ==
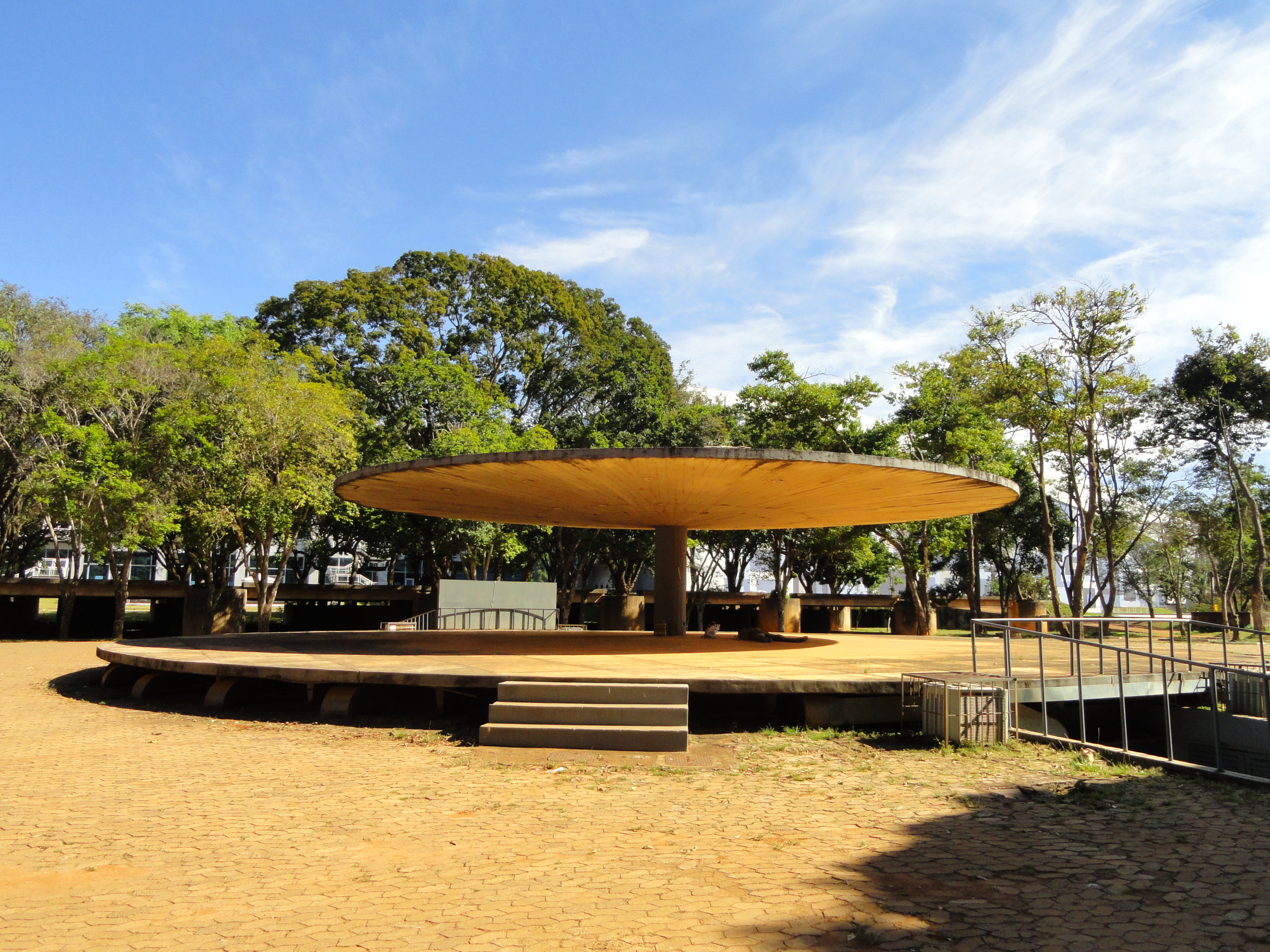
Outdoor area

The Clube de Choro de Brasília is located in a 2,000-square-meter building designed by Oscar Niemeyer and inaugurated in 2011, near the Ulysses Guimarães Convention Center. The venue also houses the Café-Concerto, with 420 seats, and the Raphael Rabello Choro School, the first school in Brazil dedicated to choro, founded in 1998 and also listed as Intangible Heritage of Brasília.

The headquarters consists of a semicircular building divided into three sections: the classrooms of the Choro School, the concert hall and Café-Concerto, and the courtyard. The Choro School, with its classrooms, workshops, and individual study rooms on the edge of the block, has a central circulation area dividing the classrooms on one side and the individual study spaces on the other. In the center is the area designated for concerts. Over the years, there have been more than 2,500 shows, with an audience of around 750,000 people.
