= Ulysses Guimarães Convention Center =

Coordinates: 15.7882°S 47.9006°W

- Centro de Convenções Uylsses Guimarães
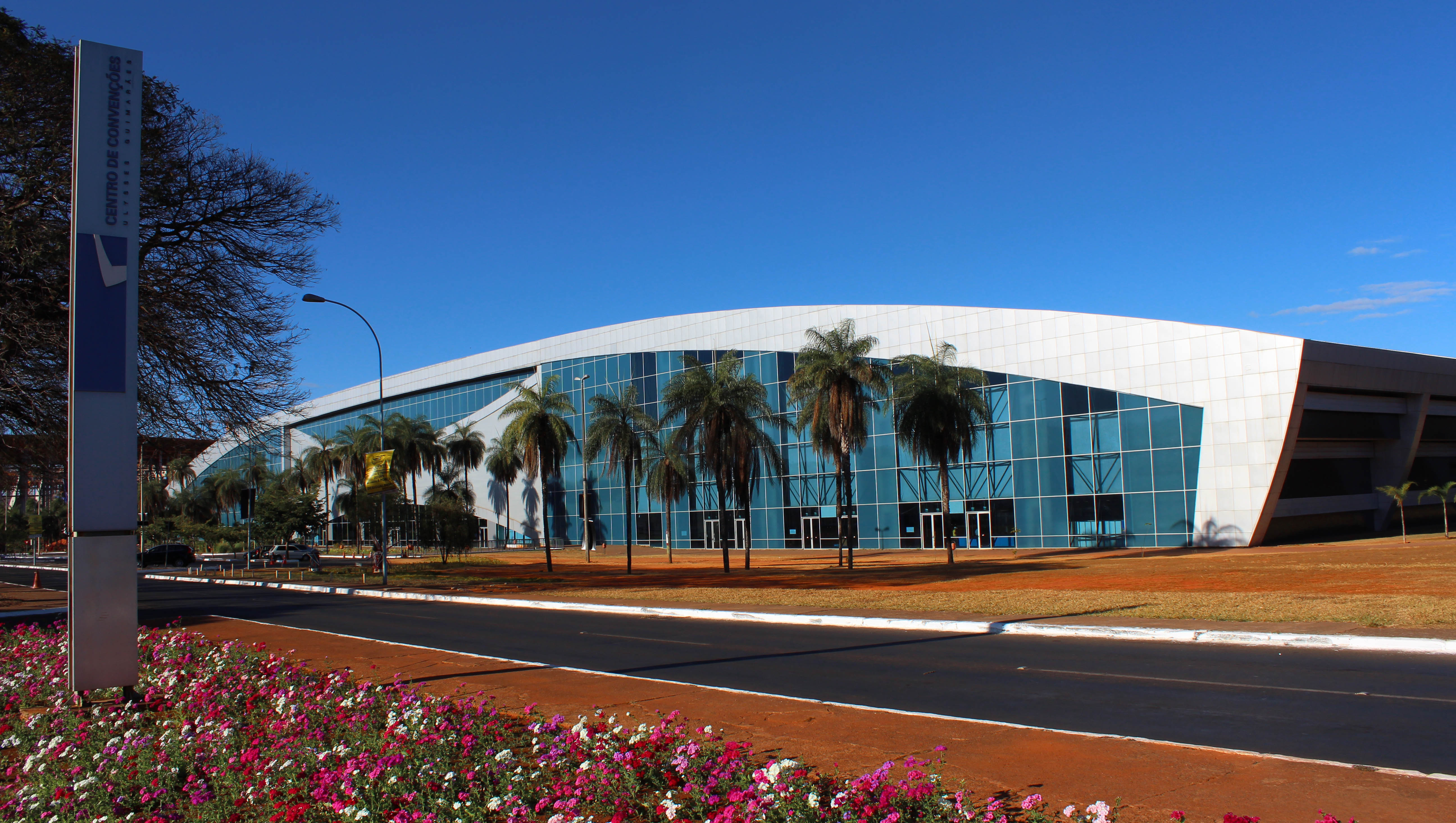
- The center from the front
- Interactive map of the Ulysses Guimarães Convention Center area
- Former names: Centro de Convenções de Brasília

General information
- Type: Convention center
- Architectural style: Contemporary
- Location: SDC - Ulysses Guimarães, Brasília - DF, 70655-775, Brazil
- Named for: Ulysses Guimarães
- Year built: 1973-1979
- Construction started: 1973
- Inaugurated: 12 March 1979; 47 years ago
- Renovated: September 2005
- Landlord: Federal District Government

Technical details
- Size: 54,000 square metres (581,251 sq ft)

Design and construction
- Architect: Sérgio Bernandes

Website
- https://ulysses.tur.br/

The Ulysses Guimarães Convention Center (Portuguese: Centro de Convenções Ulysses Guimarães, CCUG), formerly the Brasília Convention Center (Portuguese: Centro de Convenções de Brasília) is a convention center located in Brasília. It was designed by Sérgio Bernandes in 1973 and was inaugurated on 12 March 1979, being refurbished in 2005. It was renamed in 1992 to honor Ulysses Guimarães. The convention center is part of Brasílias Cultural Diffusion Sector, in the Monumental Axis, along with the Brasília Planetarium and the Brasília Choro Club.

== Facilities ==
The convention center is split into three wings, the west wing, the south wing, and the north wing.

=== West Wing ===
Comprising the area of the original Convention Center designed by Sérgio Bernardes in the 1970s, it has a free space of 2 thousand square meters on the ground and four auditoriums, named Alvorada, Planalto, Águas Claras and Buriti.

- Alvorada Auditorium: It has capacity for 160 people and has 1 support area and 2 cafeteria areas.
- Planalto Auditorium: It has capacity for 983 people and has 1 support area and 2 cafeteria areas.
- Águas Claras Auditorium: It has capacity for 273 people and has 1 support area and 2 cafeteria areas.
- Buriti Auditorium: It has capacity for 157 people and has 1 support area and 2 cafeteria areas.
- Ground floor: 2,005 square meters with capacity for 110 stands of nine square meters each.

=== South Wing ===
An air-conditioned wing designed for exhibitions and fairs with 10,200 square meters. It has a ground floor and a mezzanine.

=== North Wing ===
In the North Wing, in addition to the Master Auditorium, with capacity for more than 3 thousand people, the wing has 13 modular rooms, a multipurpose area, dressing rooms, a VIP room and a press room.

== Gallery ==
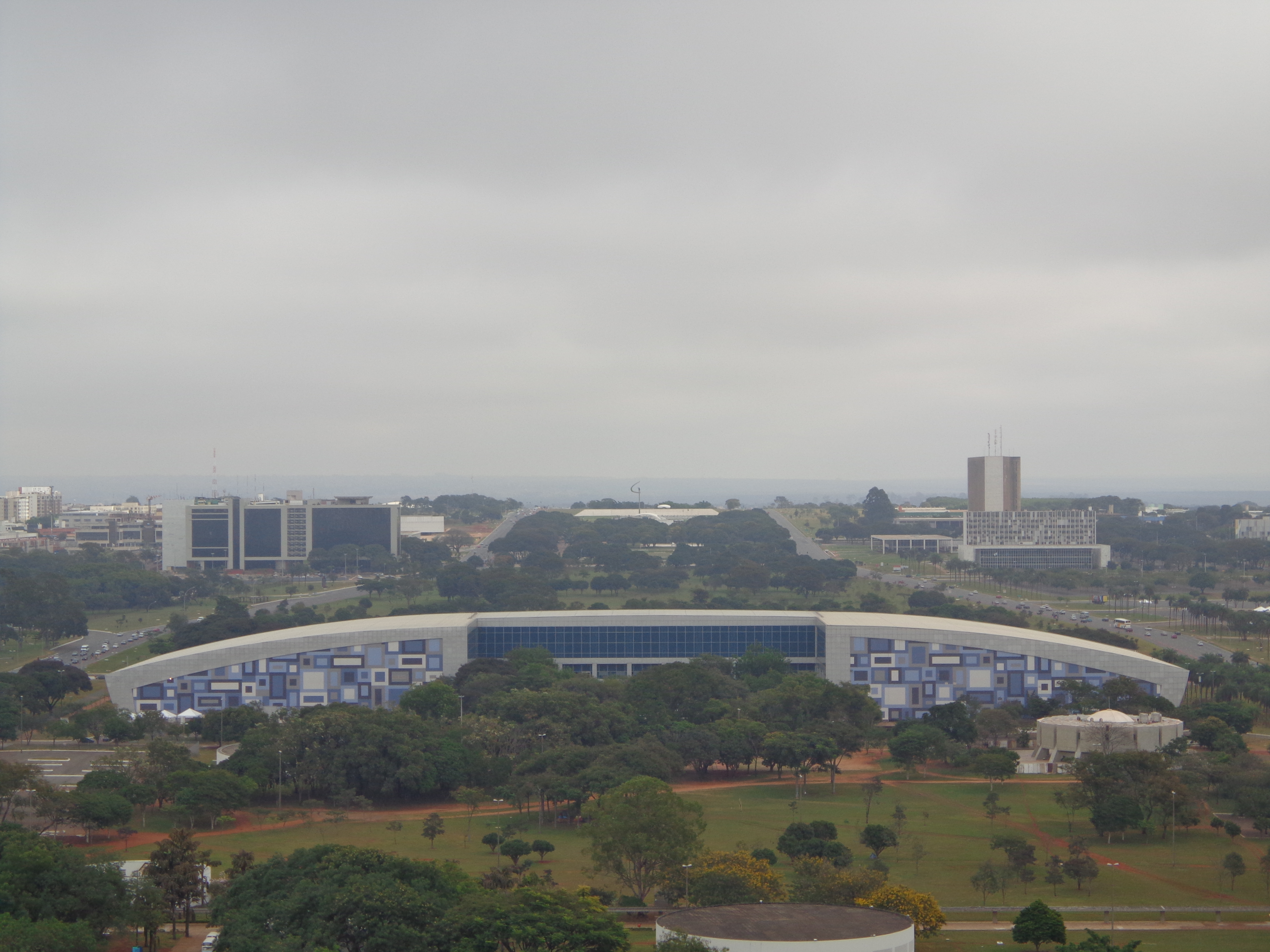
Aerial view of the center

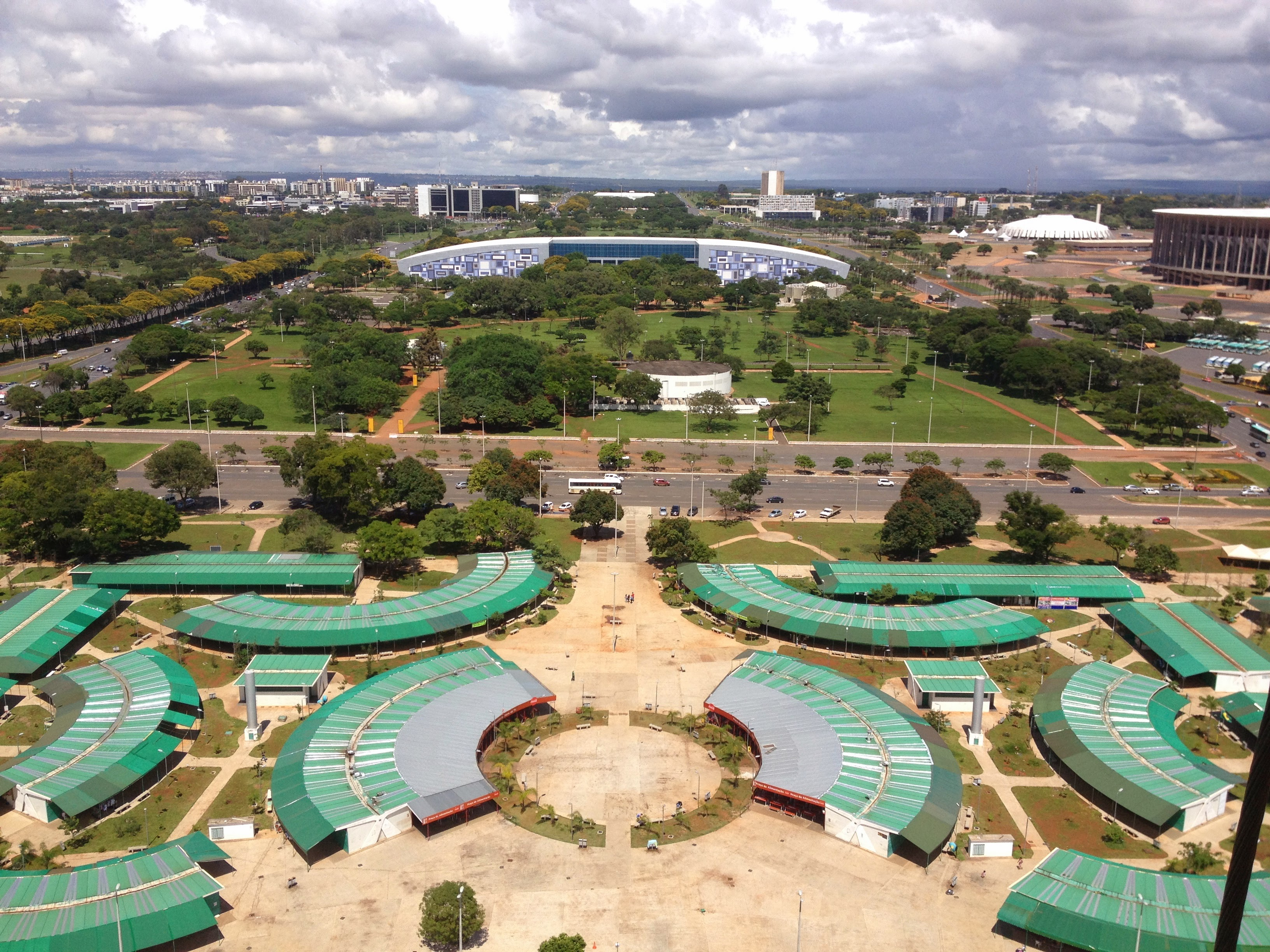
TV Tower Fair with the center in the back

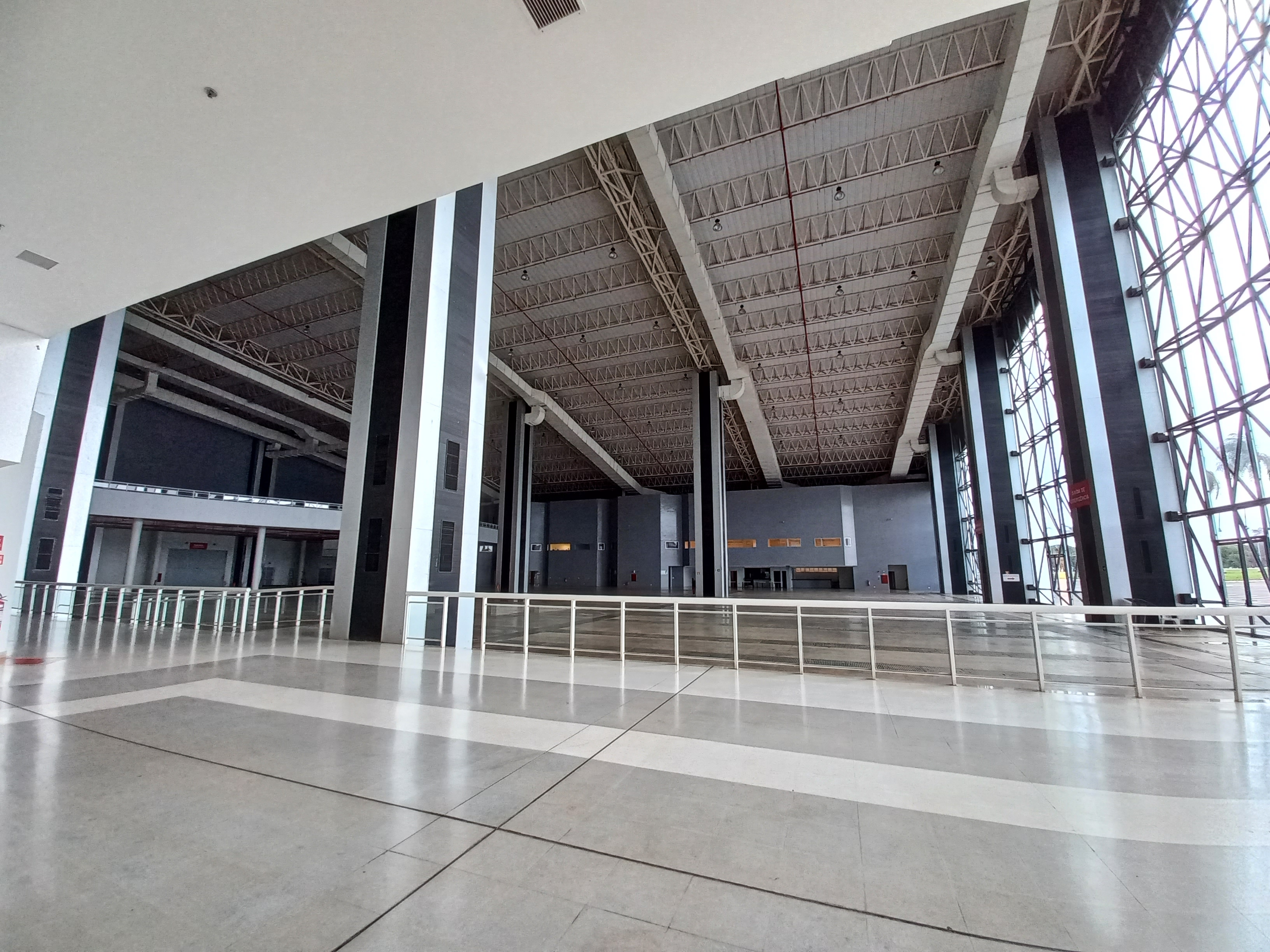
Internal view of the center

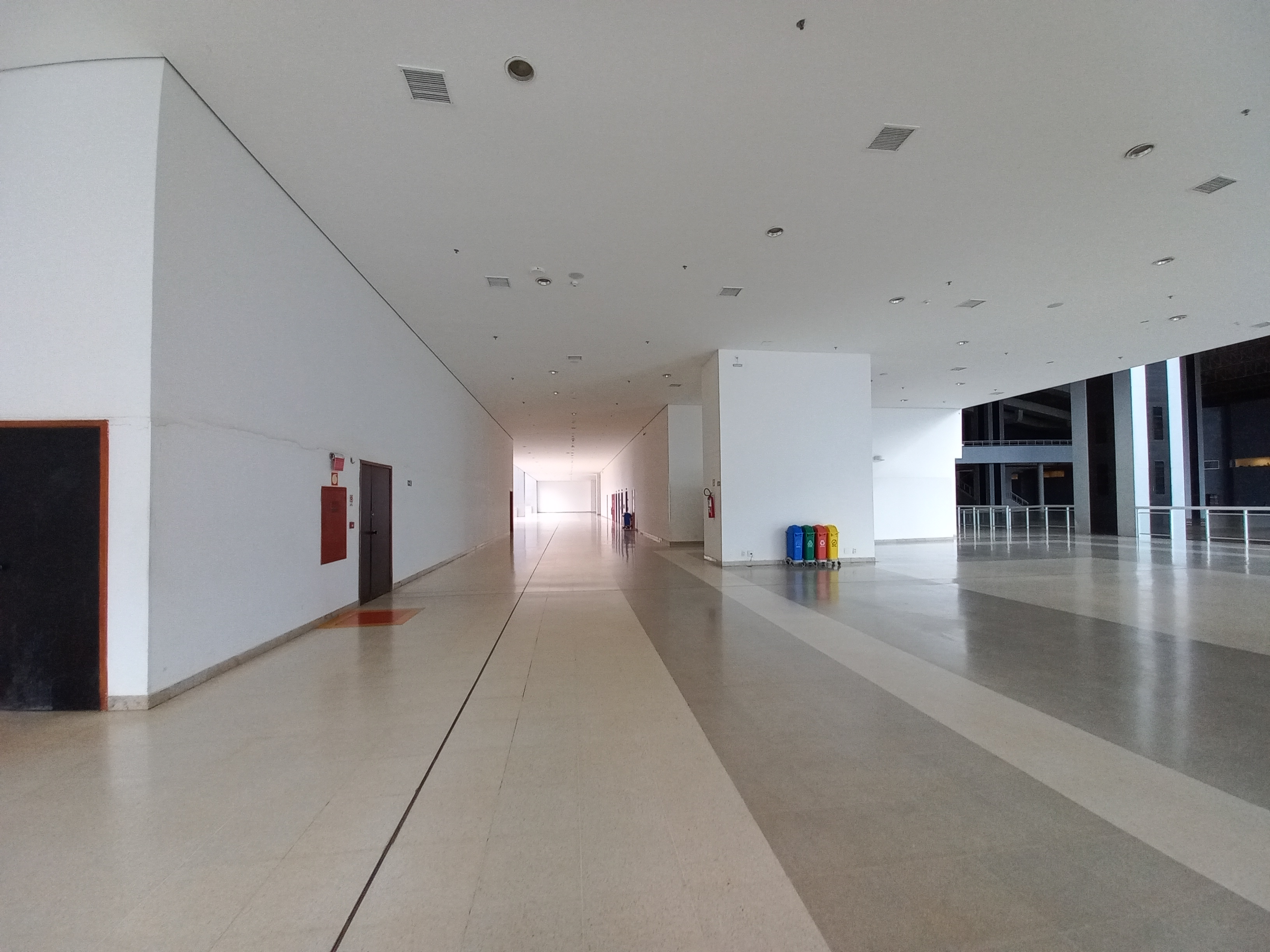
Inside the center

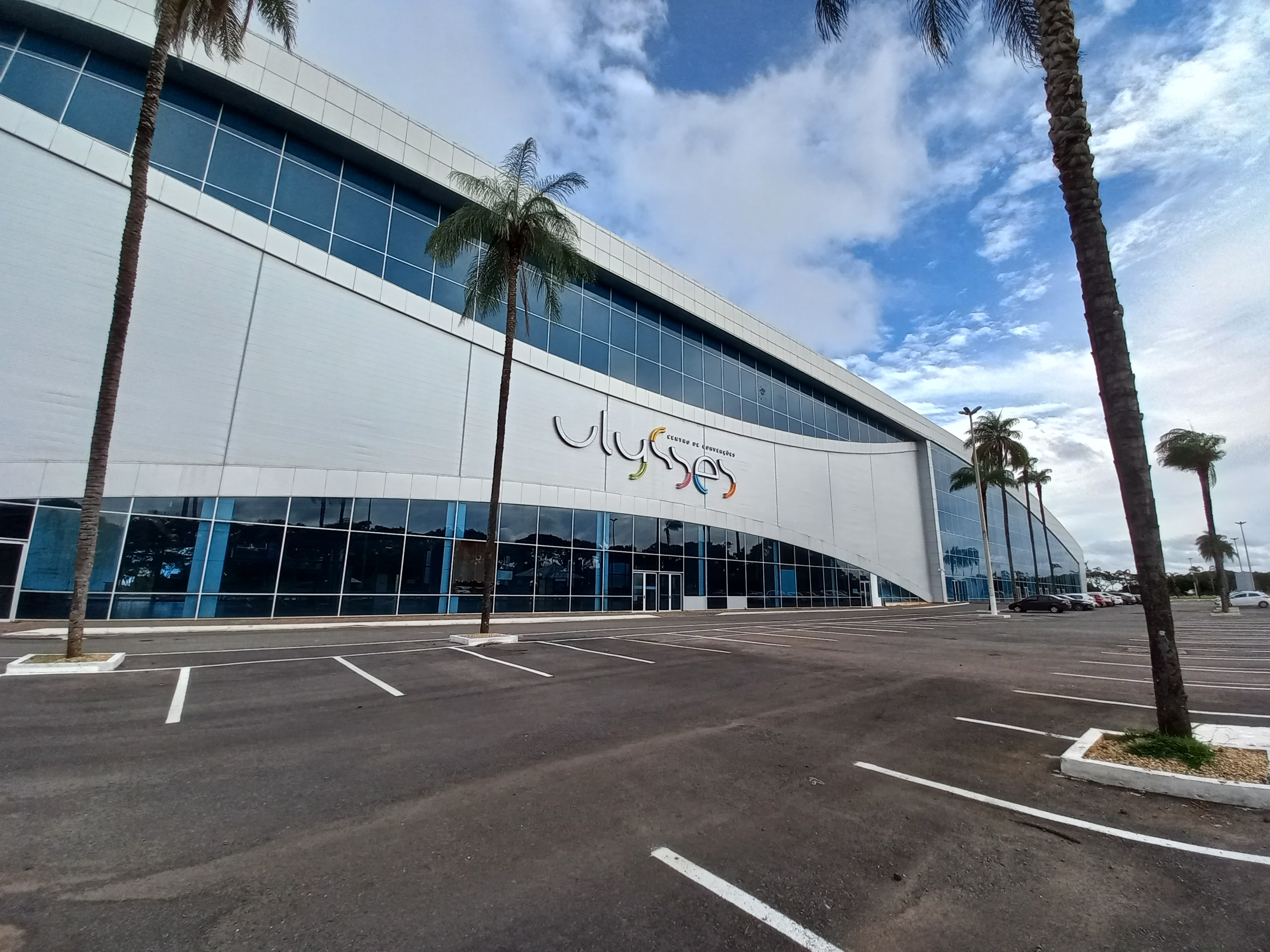
Entrance

== See also ==
- Monumental Axis
- Brasília
- Brasília TV Tower
- Brasília Planetarium
