= Brasília Planetarium =

Coordinates: 15.7877°S 47.8989°W

- Planetário de Brasília
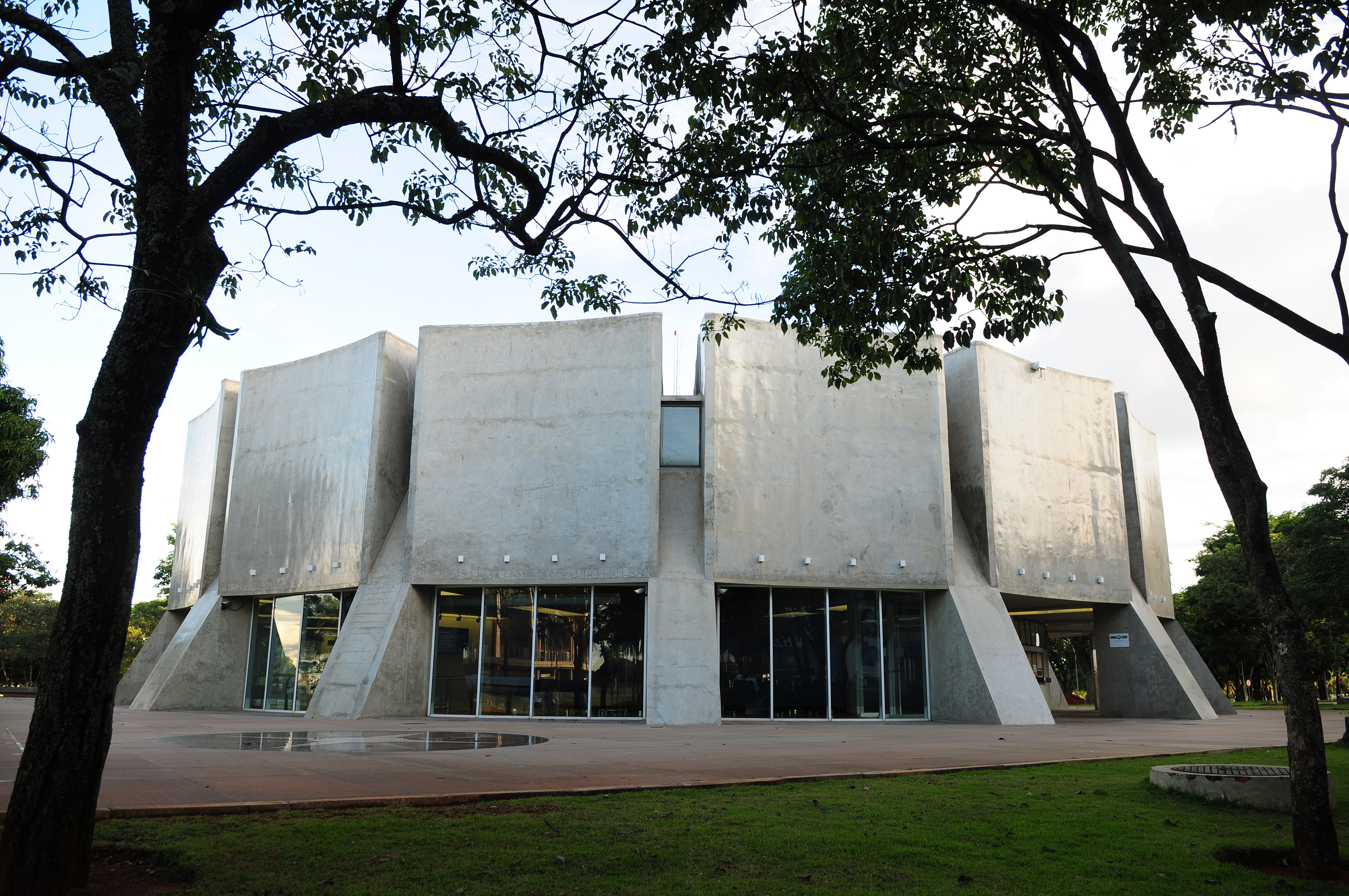
- External view of the Planetarium
- Interactive map of the Brasília Planetarium area

General information
- Architectural style: Brutalism
- Location: Brasília, SDC - Brasília, DF, 70070-350
- Inaugurated: March 15, 1974; 52 years ago
- Owner: Federal District Department of Science, Technology and Innovation

Design and construction
- Architect: Sergio Bernandes

The Brasília Planetarium Luiz Cruls (Portuguese: Planetário de Brasília Luiz Cruls, lit. 'Planetarium of Brasília Luiz Cruls'), colloquially known as the Brasília Planetarium or the Planetarium of Brasília, is a planetarium located in Brasília, in the Federal District. Inaugurated on 15 March 1974, it was designed by architect Sérgio Bernandes using a Brutalist style. It is part of the Monumental Axis' Cultural Diffusion Sector (Portuguese: Setor de Difusão Cultural), being located between the Brasília TV Tower, the Ulysses Guimarães Convention Center, and near the Estádio Nacional Mané Garrincha and the Brasília Choro Club. The Planetarium is part of the Brazilian Association of Planetariums.

== History ==
The Brasília Planetarium was initially inaugurated in March 1974, being designed by Sérgio Bernandes. In 2006, it was closed for refurbishing due to several structural problems, which lasted until 2013. It was reopened following construction work on 11 December 2013.

== Characteristics ==
The planetarium was designed by architect Sérgio Bernandes, with a Brutalist architectural style, having bare concrete and a geometric shape resembling a flying saucer. Its center is formed by two semi-spherical domes, one inside the other, surrounded by sixteen identical volumes separated from each other by radial strips one meter thick, forming a hexadecagon with concave sides. These volumes form sixteen faces, which represent the sixteen cardinal points of the compass rose.

== Gallery ==
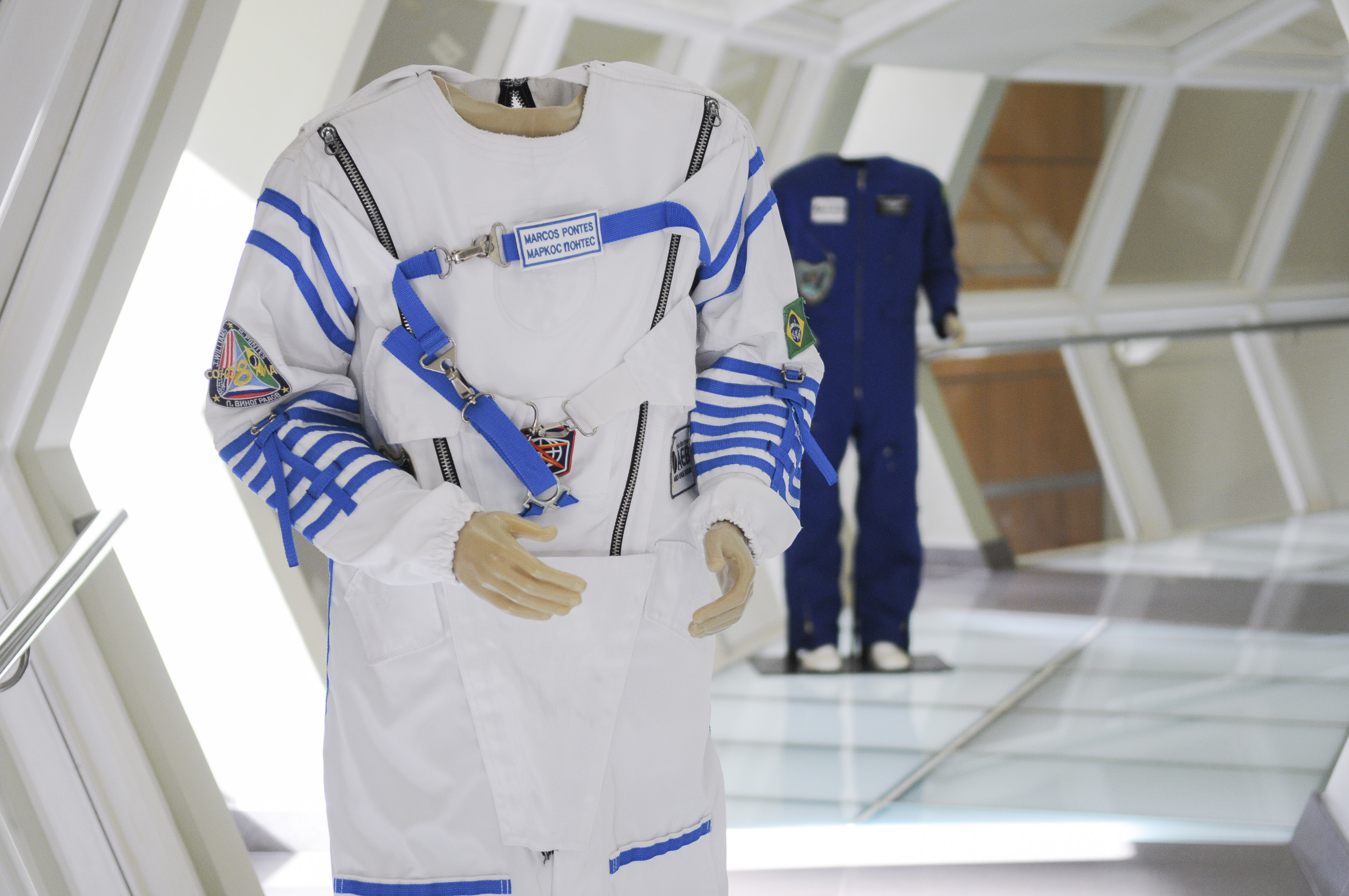
Replica of the suit worn by Marcos Pontes on his Missão Centenário flight to the International Space Station aboard the Soyuz TMA-8 in 2006

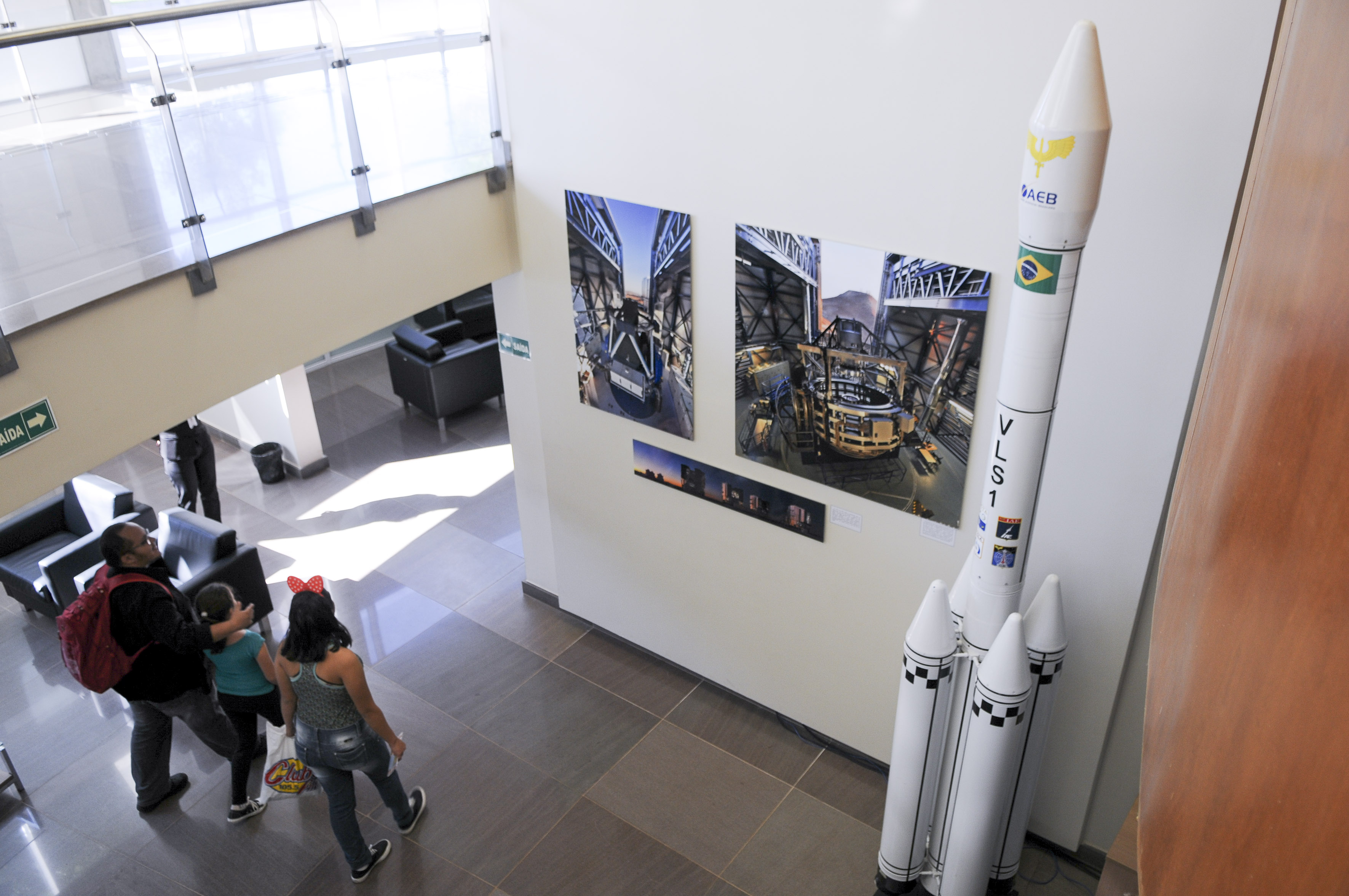
Lower scale replica of the Brazilian Space Agency's VLS-1

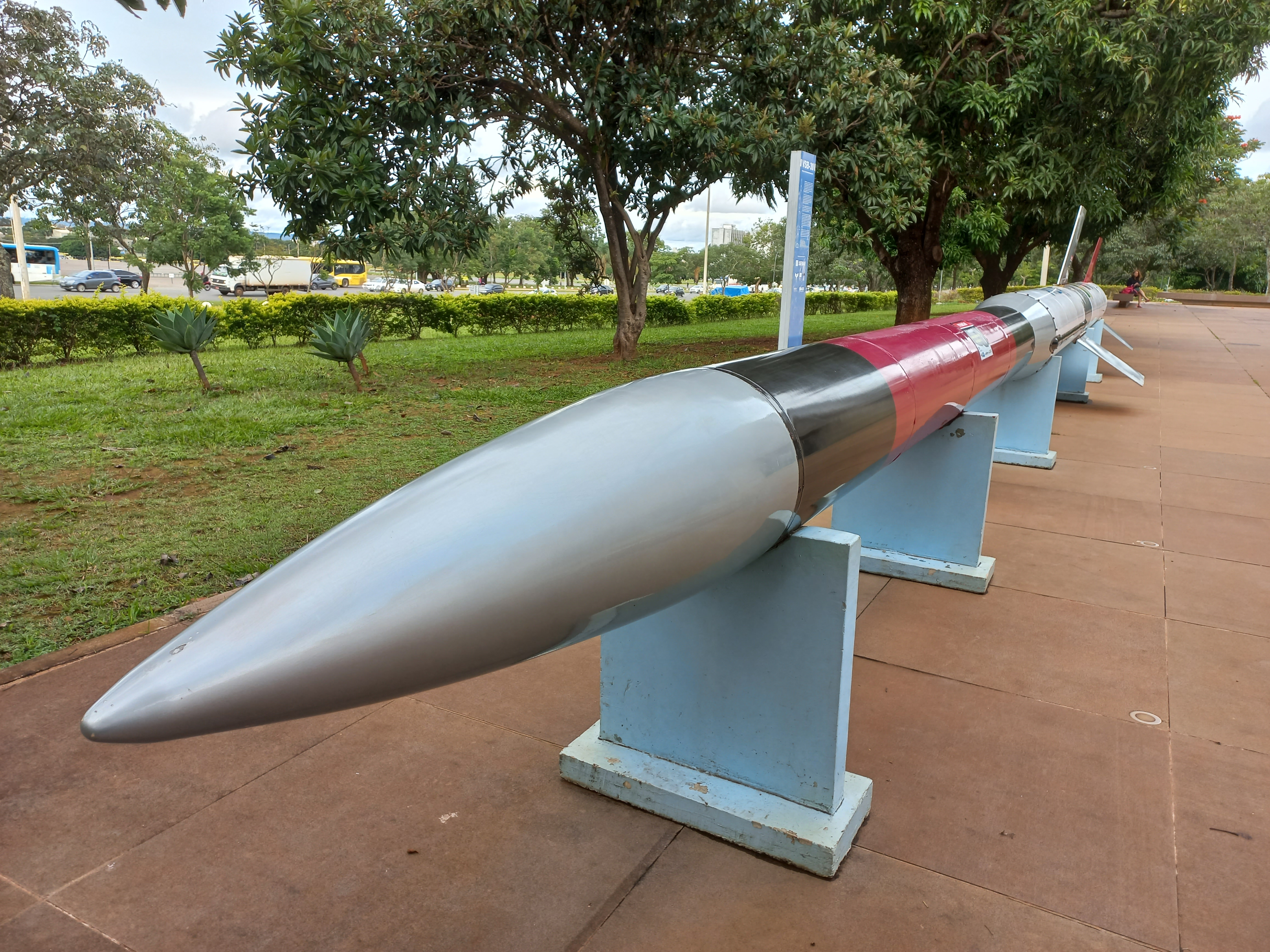
Display replica of the VSB-30

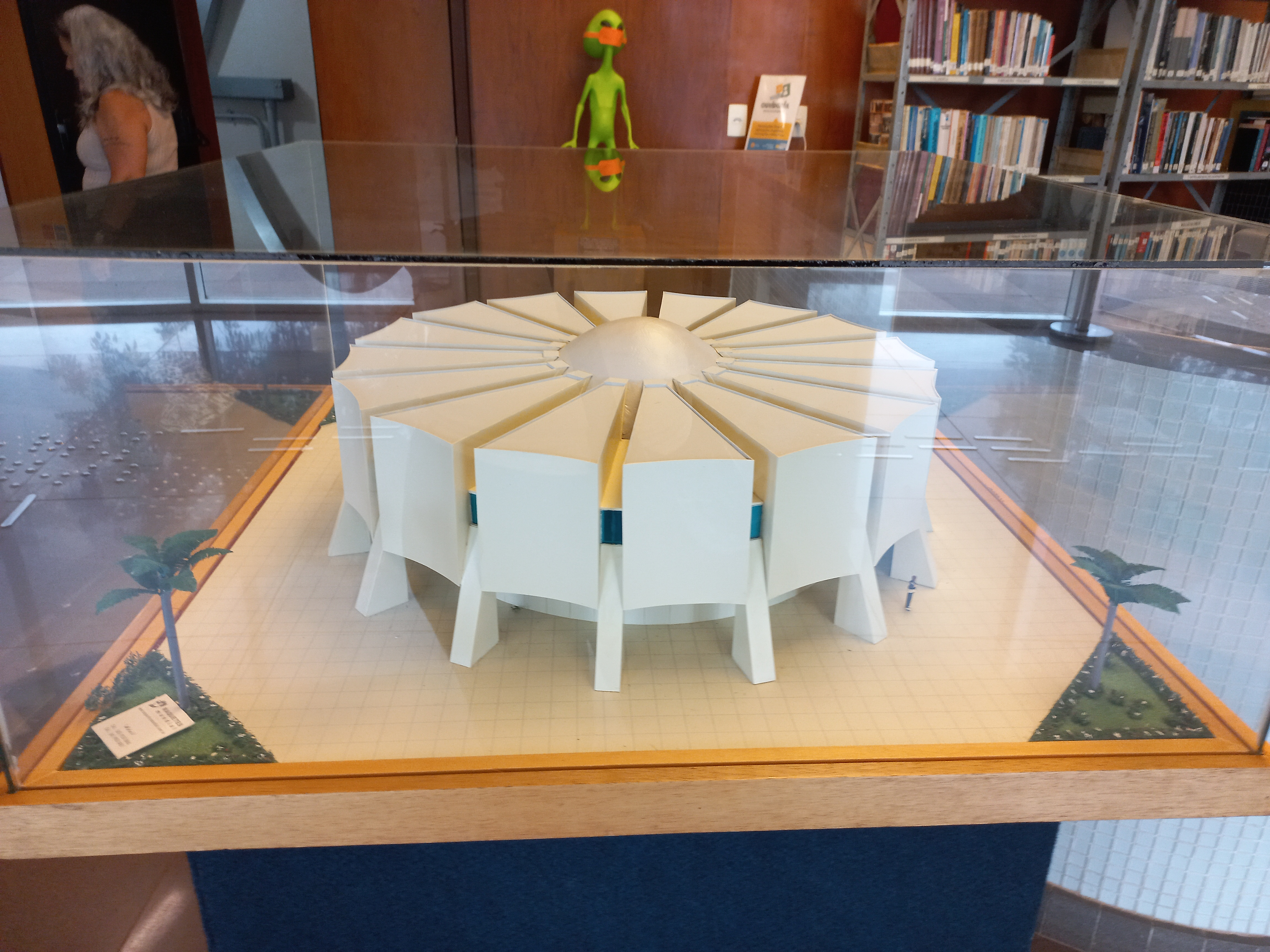
Miniature replica of the Planetarium

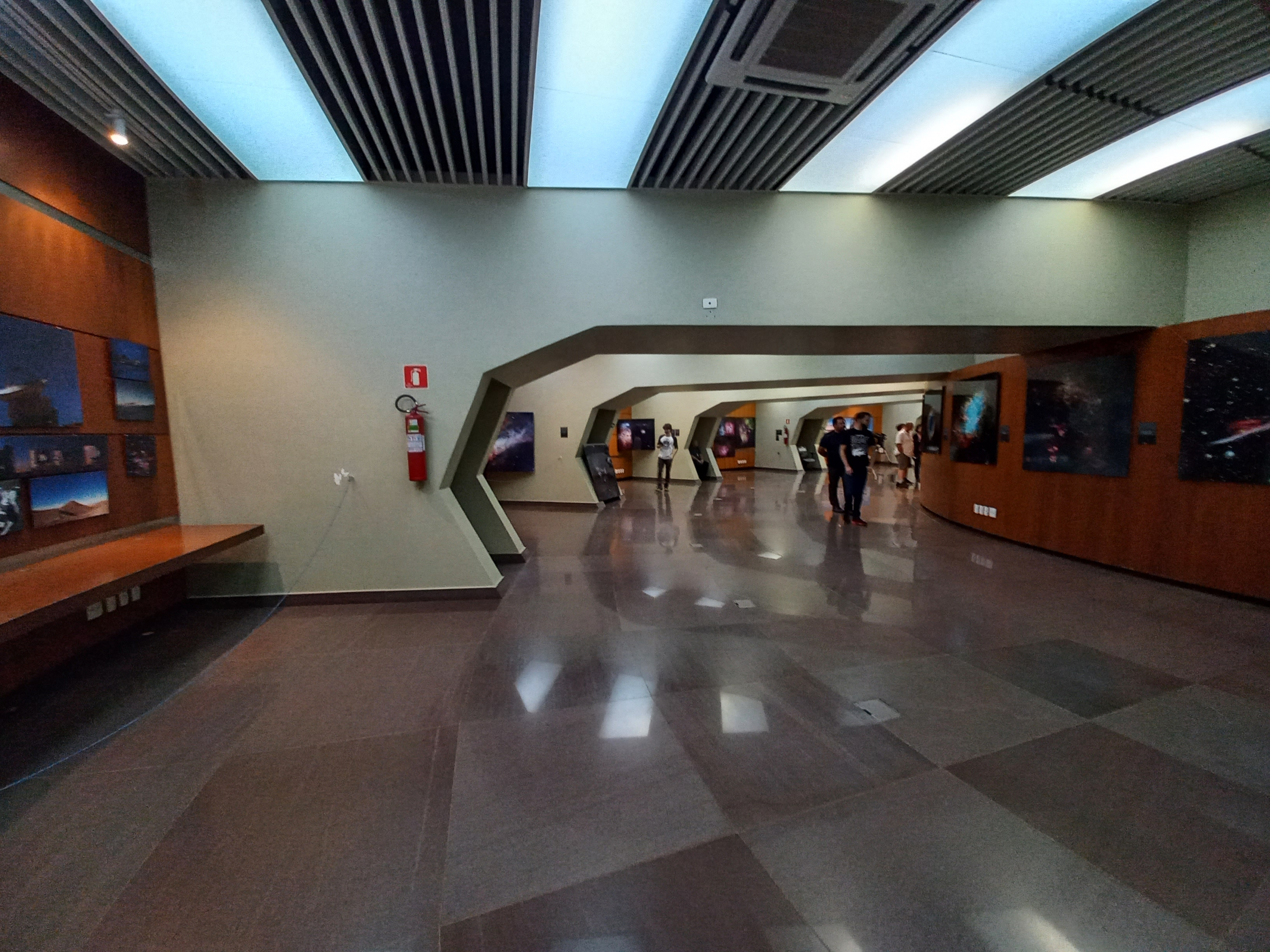
Interior of the planetarium

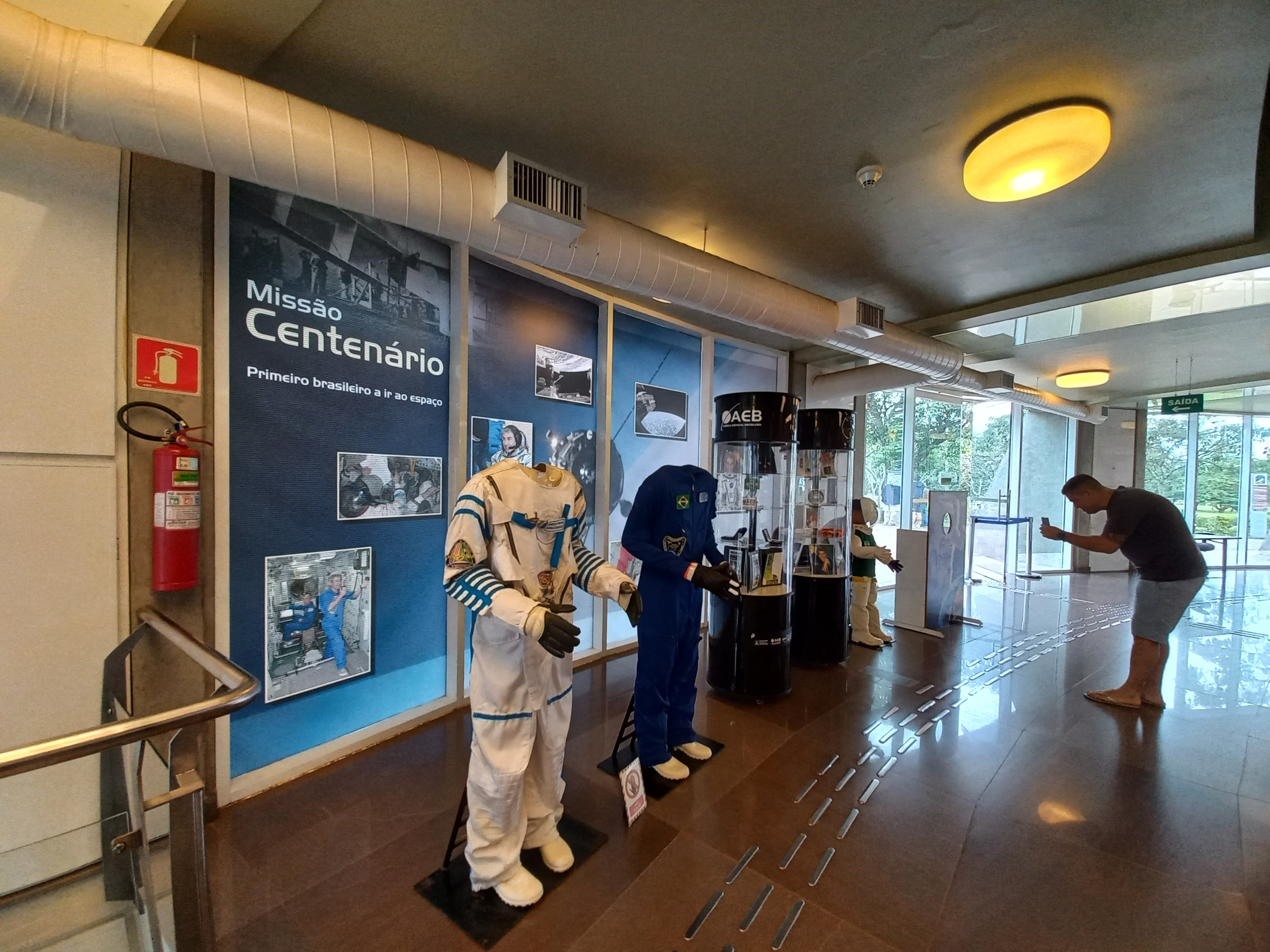
Replicas of the Missão Centenário spacesuits

== See also ==
- List of planetariums
- Planetarium
- Monumental Axis
