= States Lane =

Street in Brasília, Distrito Federal, Brazil

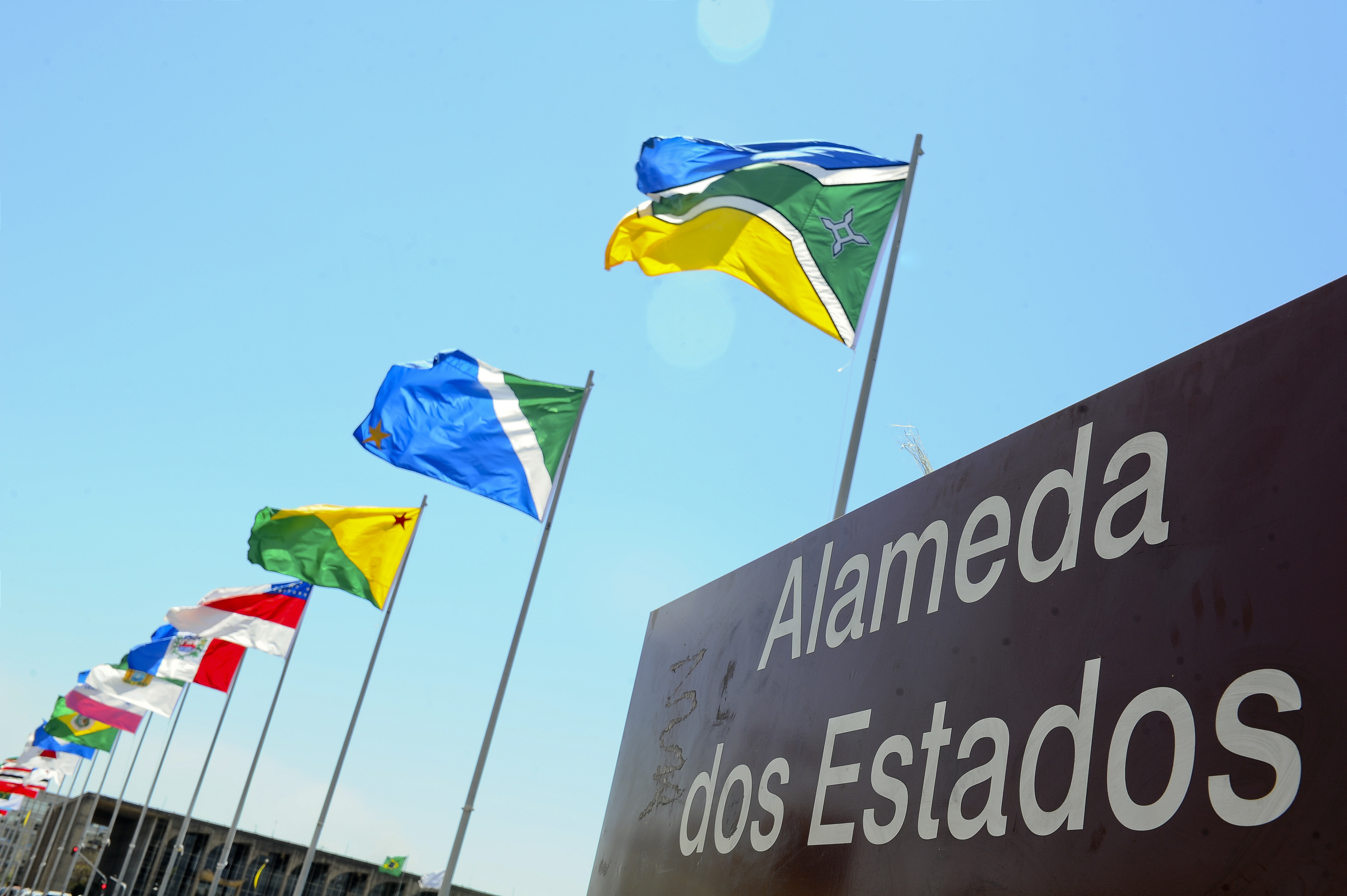
- States Lane in 2017
- Interactive map of States Lane
- Native name: Alameda dos Estados (Portuguese)
- Maintained by: Secretary of State for Tourism of the Federal District (Setur-DF)
- Coordinates: 15°47′56″S 47°52′00″W

Interactive map of the States Lane

States Lane (Portuguese: Alameda dos Estados) is a north–south street in Brasília, Federal District that is a popular tourist attraction. Located in the Ministries Esplanade in front of the National Congress Palace in the Monumental Axis, this street contains 28 flags: the Brazilian national flag, the flag of the Federal District, and flags of the 26 states of Brazil. It is a popular place for visitors to take pictures with the flag of their state.

The flags are changed on average every three months on dates such as the 1st day of the year, April 21st (Anniversary of the inauguration of Brasília and the death of Tiradentes), September 7th (Brazilian Independence Day), and November 19th (Flag Day). The local fire department assists in maintaining and exchanging the flags.

Despite being responsible for maintaining the street, the Secretary of State for Tourism of the Federal District does not know when the street was built nor its history or significance.

== Gallery ==
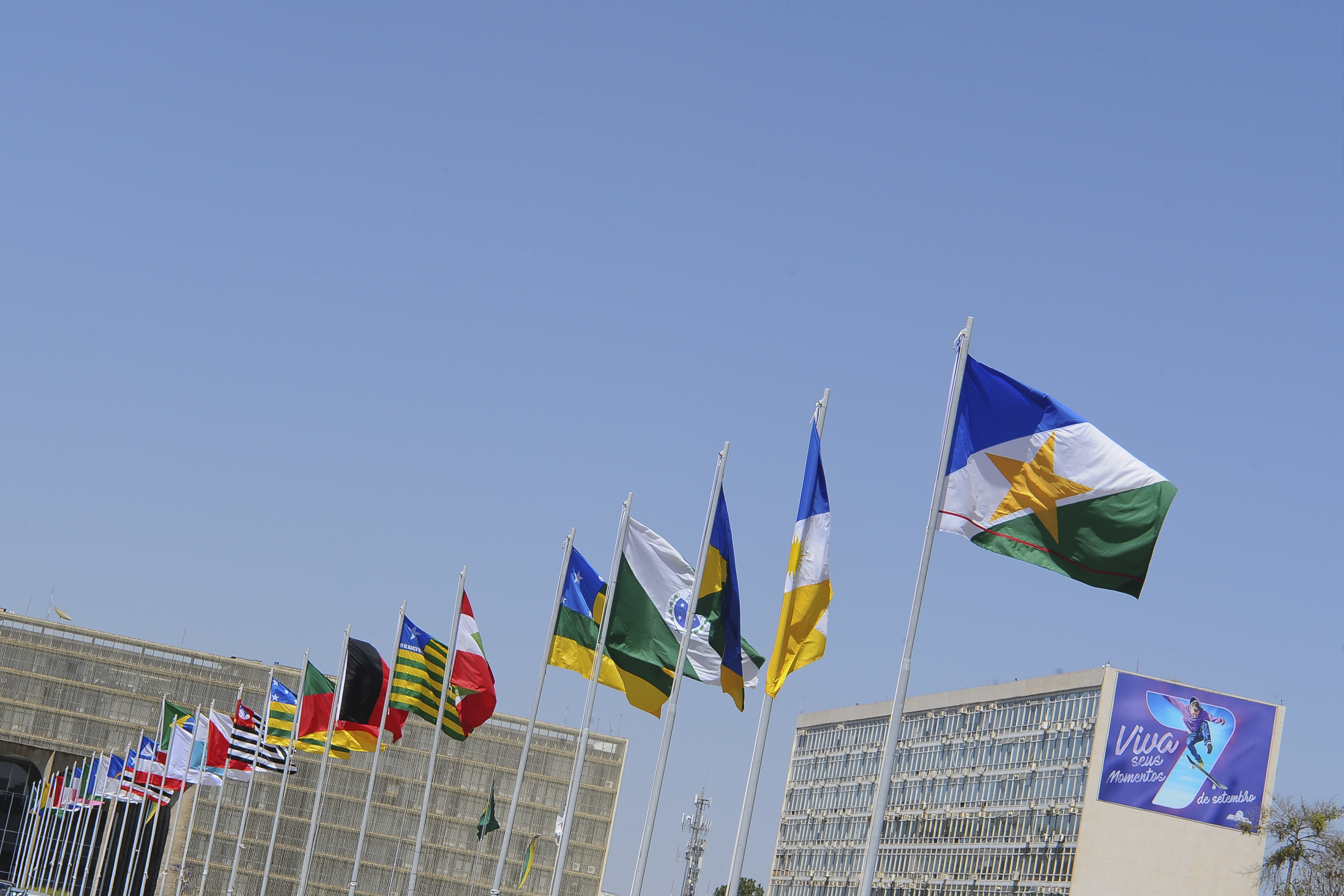

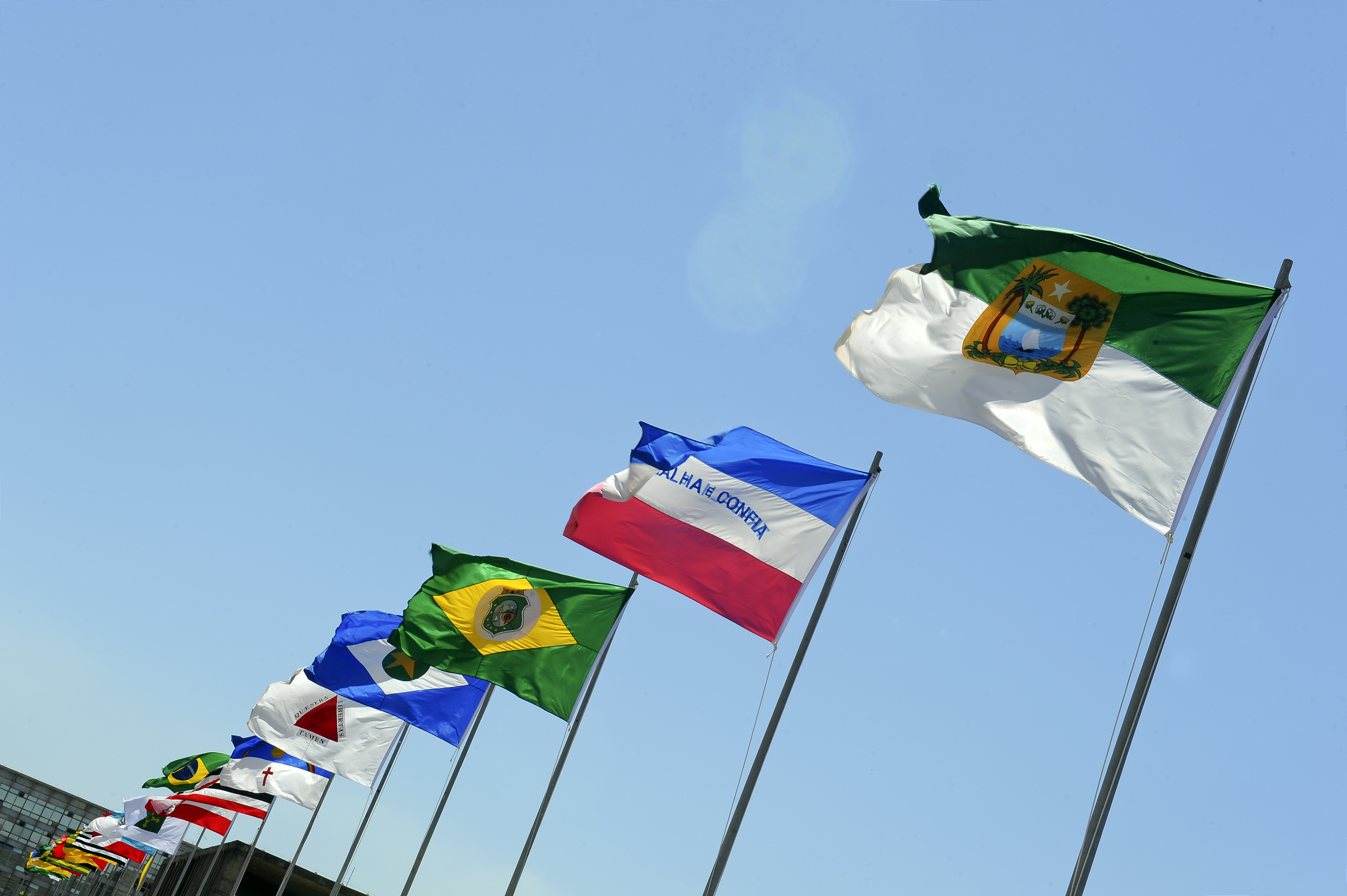

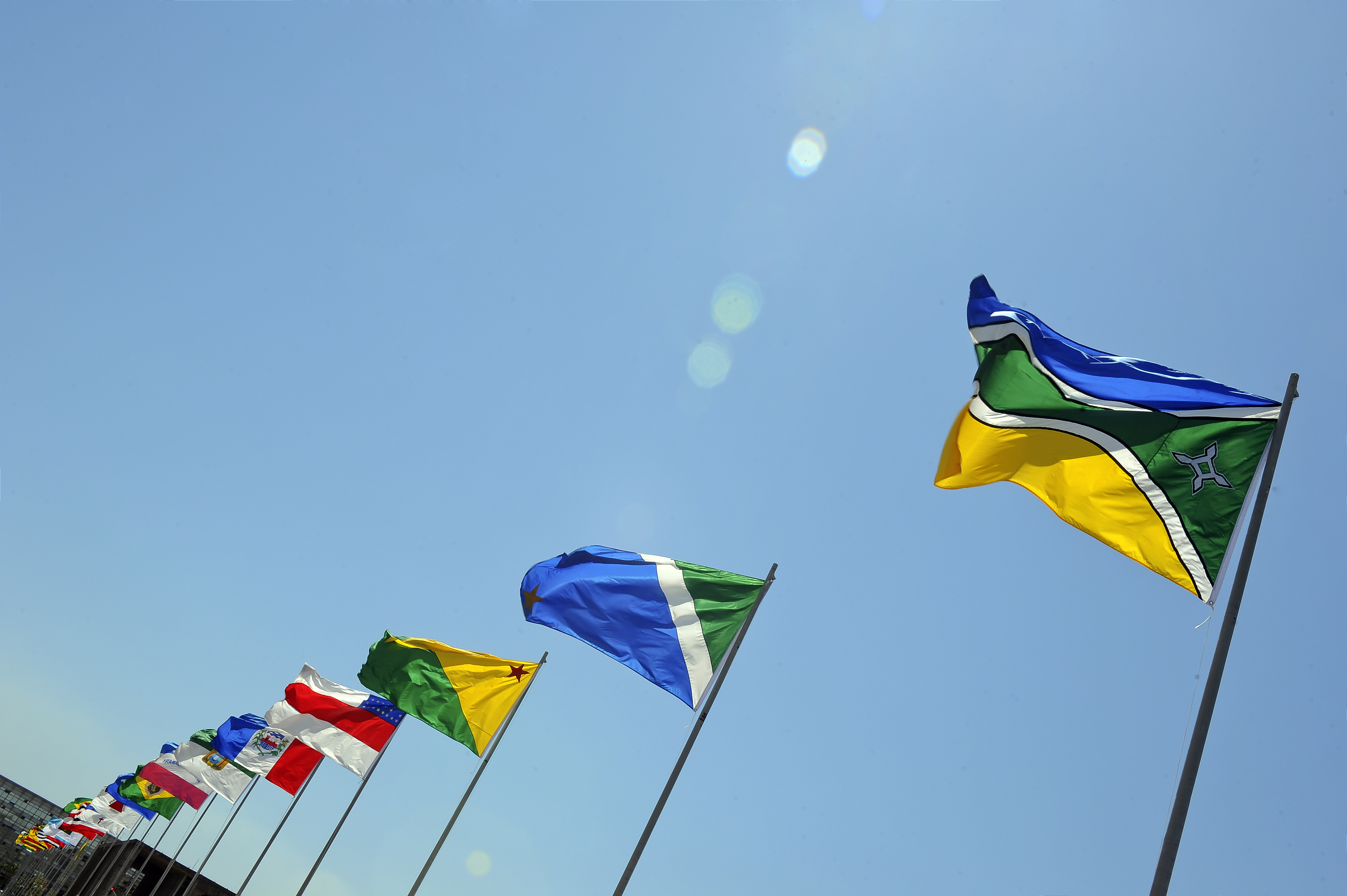

== See also ==
- Monumental Axis
- List of Brazilian flags § First-level administrative divisions
