= Brasília TV Tower =

TV Tower
- Torre de TV
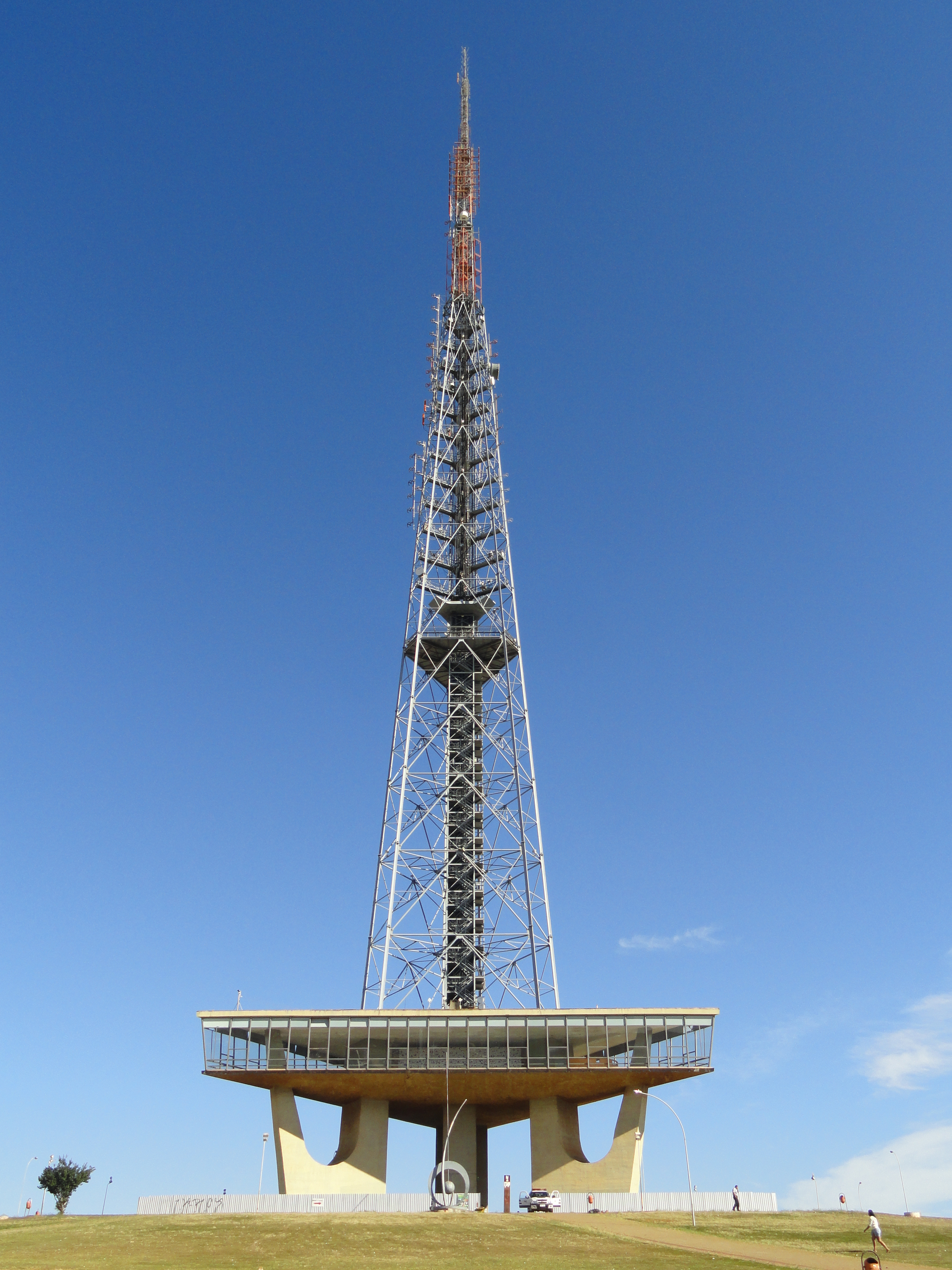
- TV Tower
- Interactive map of the TV Tower area

General information
- Type: Observation tower Broadcasting tower
- Location: Brasília, Brazil, Eixo Monumental S/N, Brasília, Distrito Federal 70297-400
- Coordinates: 15.790499°S 47.892977°W
- Opened: 1965
- Owner: Government of the Federal District
- Landlord: Banco de Brasília

Height
- Height: 224 m

Design and construction
- Architect: Lúcio Costa

The Brasília TV Tower (Portuguese: Torre de TV de Brasília) is a radio and television transmission tower built in Brasília and inaugurated in 1967 with a height of 224 meters. It is located at the Monumental Axis, in the Burle Marx Garden, and besides the tower itself, which has a belvedere and a museum, the Museum of Gems, its immediate surroundings have several attractions, such as the Fair Tower and the TV Tower Fountain, which makes the place one of the most visited by tourists, receiving from ten to twelve thousand people a week.

The tower originally had a height of 218 metres. The tower added another six metres after additions by the TV channel Bandeirantes. First it was 212 then it added for the current height of 224 metres. The tower is the fourth tallest structure in Brazil and is also one of the most noticeable from Juscelino Kubitschek Bridge. It is located on Brasília's Monumental Axis.

== Architecture ==
The base of the building is a triangular-shaped exposed concrete volume, twenty-five meters high, enclosed by glass. The volume is supported by three pillars that form a V and enter the volume. The inner part of these pillars serve as a connection and base for the metallic tower, which starts from the volume where the Gems Museum is located.

The metallic part is one hundred and ninety-two meters high. It is composed of three sections, the first and longest one hundred and twenty-two meters, the second forty-five meters high, and the last twenty-four meters.

Altogether, the pillars, the volume, and the metal tower are 224 meters. It is possible to climb the tower by an elevator and a stairway to the belvedere, and from there, only by a stairway for maintenance of the transmission tower.

== Structures ==
=== Belvedere ===
Taking advantage of its privileged location for observation, in the center of the capital, a belvedere was built at 75 meters high with capacity for 150 people. The attraction is open Tuesdays through Sundays, from 9am to 7pm. The belvedere was inaugurated in 1965, two years before the inauguration of the tower. It is accessible by an elevator, and also has a stairway for service and emergencies.

From there, it is possible to see much of the Plano Piloto, including the Esplanade of the Ministries, the Northern and Southern Hotel Sectors, the National Stadium of Brasília Mané Garrincha and the Nelson Piquet International Autodrome, as well as Lake Paranoá and other administrative regions.

=== Tower Fair ===
One of the biggest symbols of the capital, the Feira da Torre began during the 1970s, when the first stalls began to be placed under the tower. In 2010 construction began on a fixed structure for the tower in an area further down the tower, which would be ready for Brasília's 50th anniversary, but the work was only completed the following year. In 2014, the complex underwent a new construction work, this time there was the construction of accessibility works, such as elevators, stairs and escalators between the fair and the tower.

=== Museum of Gems ===
The Gem Museum is a permanent exhibition of gemstones. It is located on the second floor of the tower, in the triangular volume above the pillars.

=== Space Age Sculpture ===
In front of it is the "Space Age" (original name "Force noire ou l'odyssée des espasmes" - Black Force or The Odyssey of Spasms), a 15-meter high bronze sculpture by artist Alexandre Wakhevitch, also popularly known as Berimbau.

=== TV Tower Fountain ===
It was delivered in 2010 as a way to celebrate the fiftieth anniversary of the city of Brasília, with an estimated budget of nine million reais. It is 80 meters in diameter and has two thousand water nozzles, reaching up to 50 meters high with its main jet. During the weekend, forty-minute shows are held, where the waters become colorful and the movement follows the rhythm of music.

Created by Burle Marx, The Burle Marx Garden is a project that is currently under construction. When ready, it will include a wide variety of typical cerrado plants and trees, including species of piqui, voquisia, guanandi, embiruçu, pau-rosa, pau-terra, paineira rosa, ipê amarelo, angico-preto, quaresmeira-roxa, ipê roxo, pau-d'óleo, jequitibá vermelho, sucupira branca, cedar, mulungu, and ingá-mirim.

The project will be executed by Novacap, and will also include sidewalks, bike paths, as well as water mirrors, fish boxes, seating areas with wooden benches, and islands and ornamental flowerbeds.

== Gallery ==
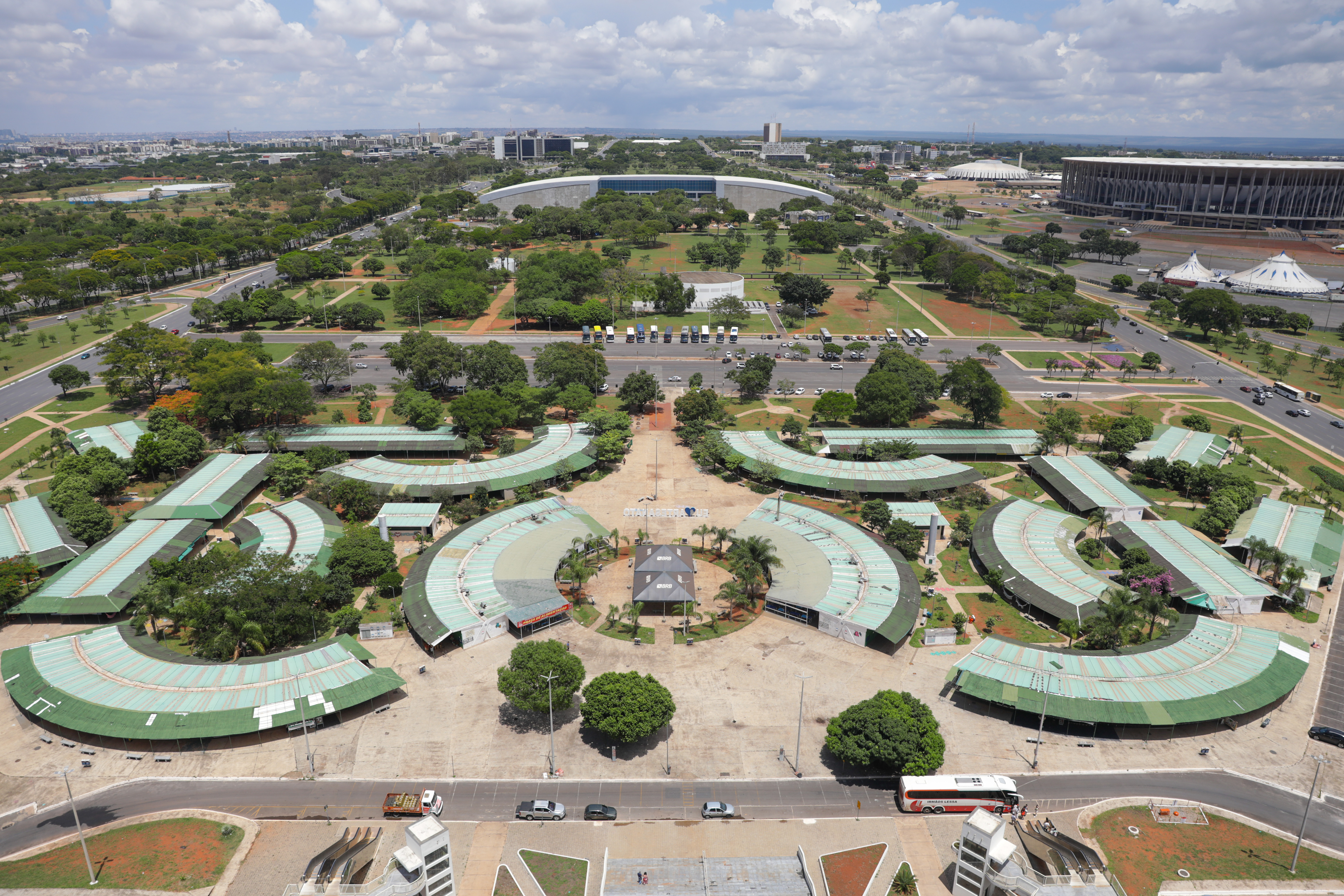
TV Tower Fair from the tower's observation deck

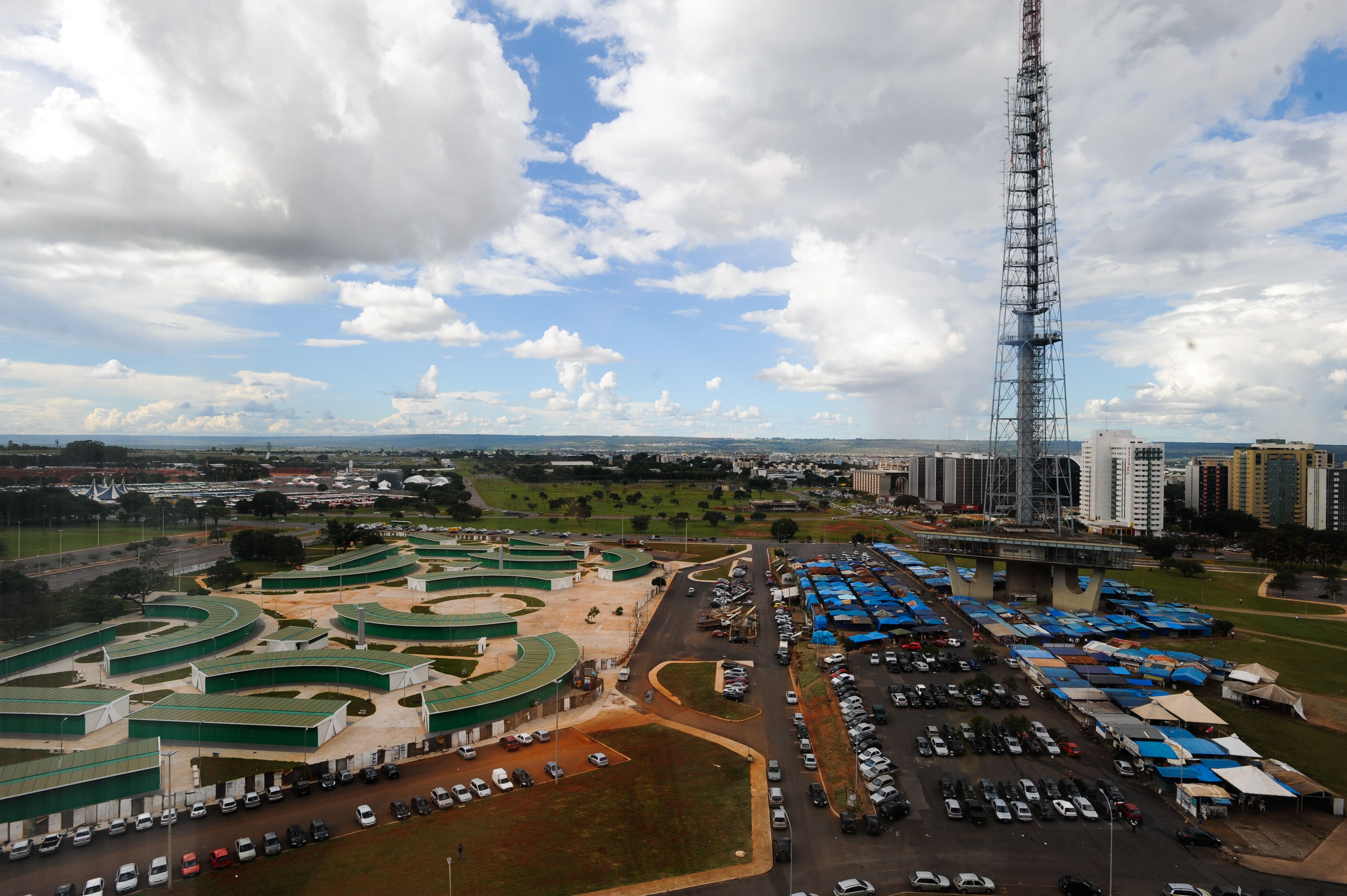
Aerial view of the TV Tower and its fair

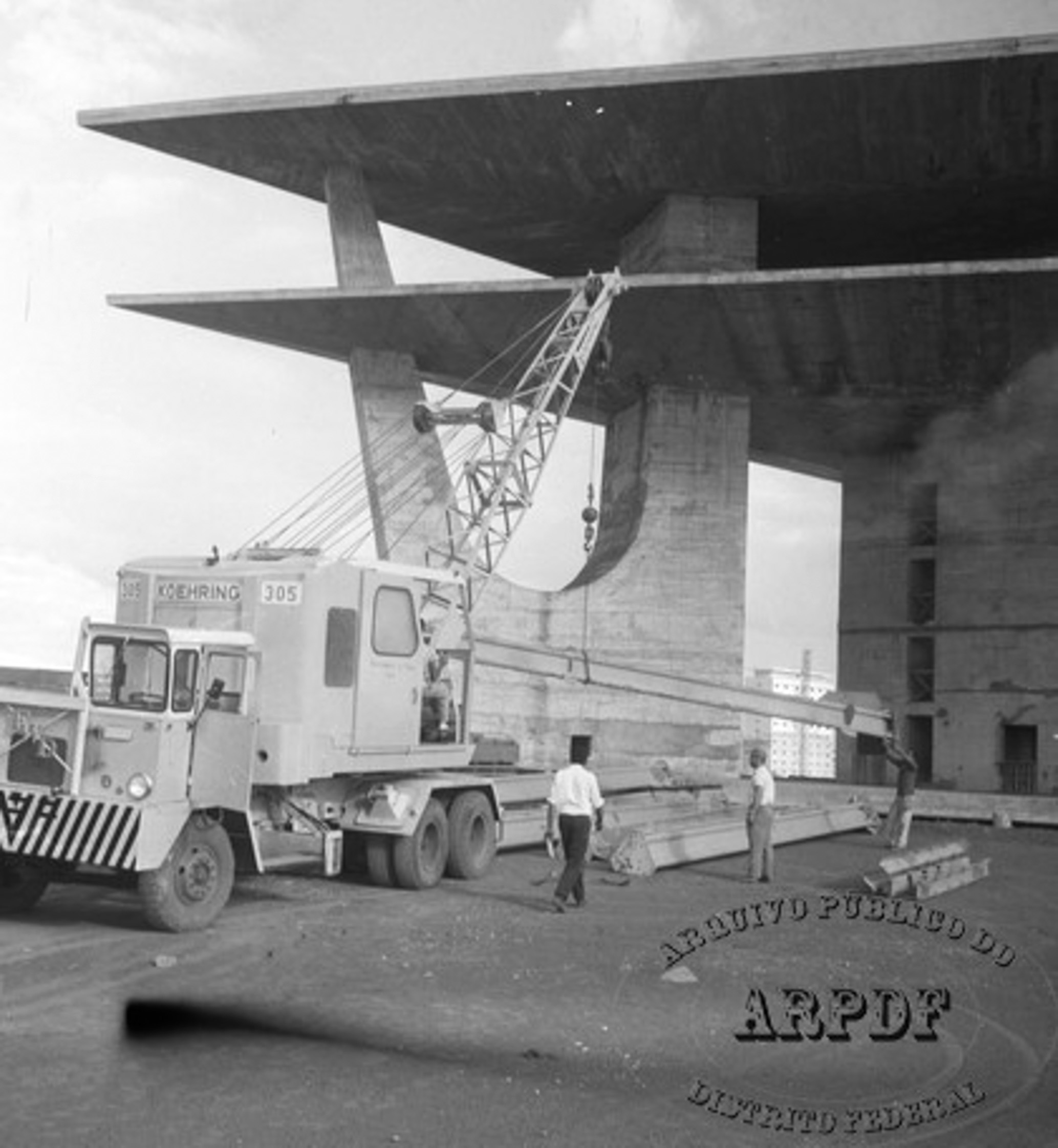
TV Tower under construction

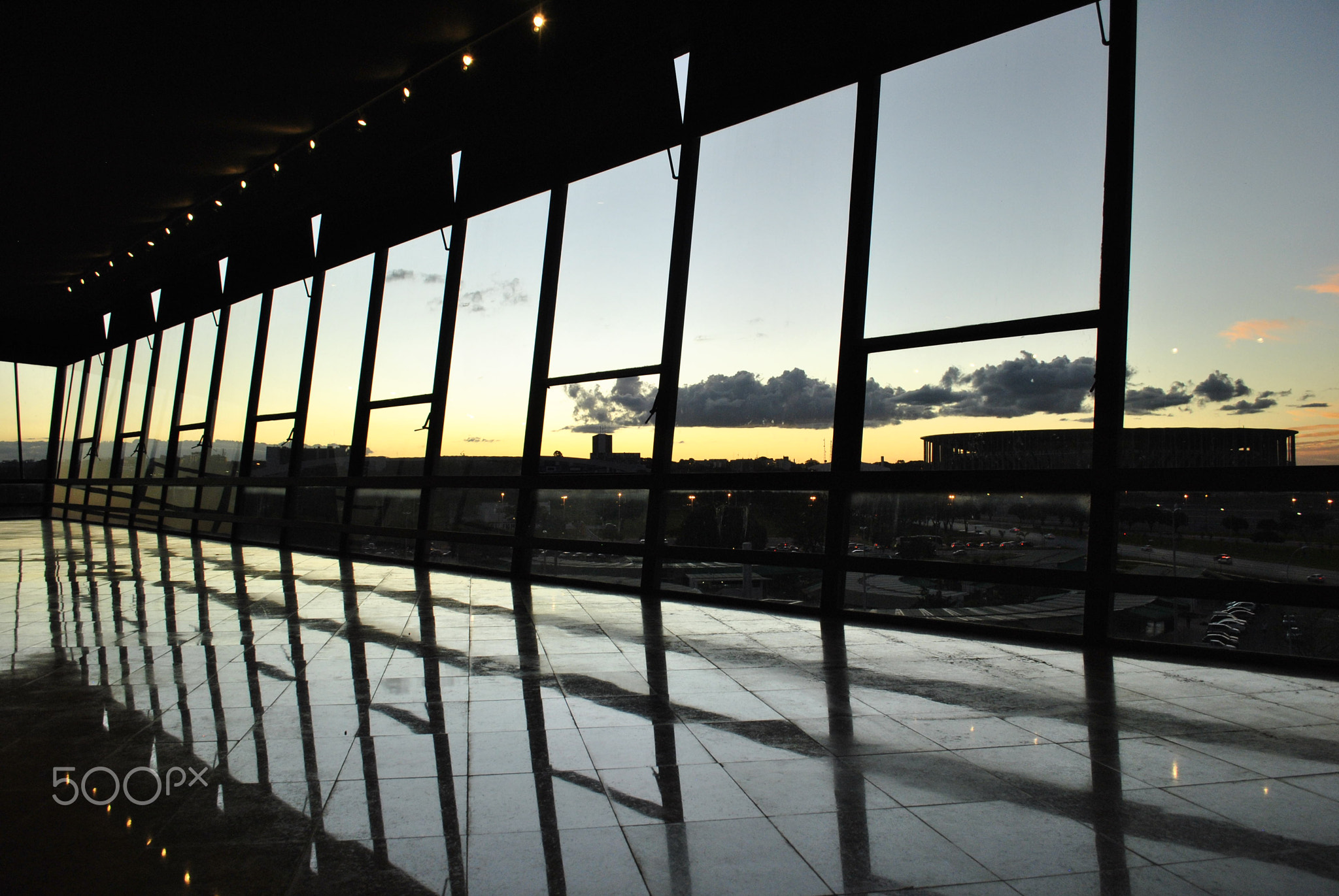
Inside the second floor

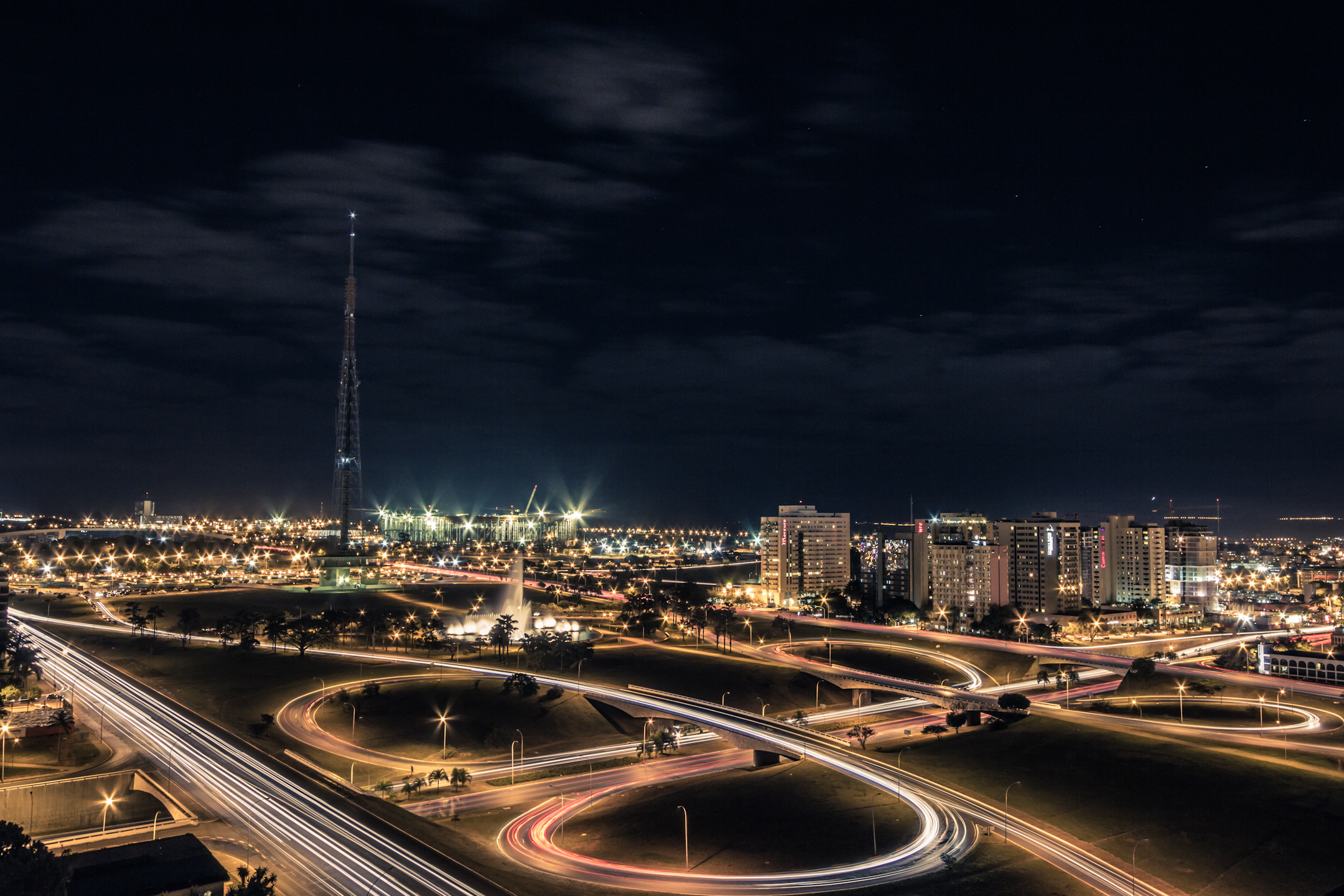
Brasília's Central Zone at night

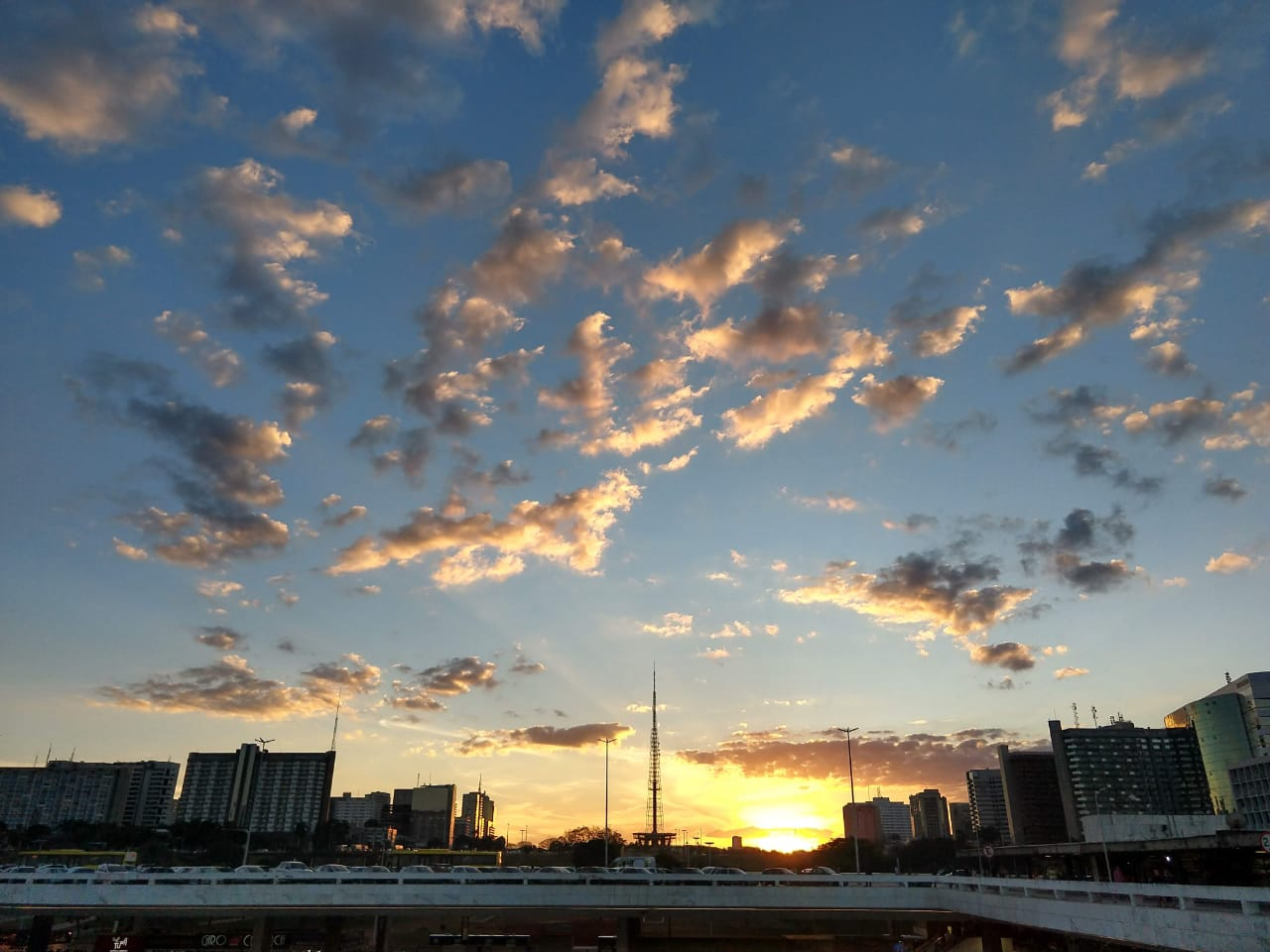
The TV Tower as seen from the Plano Piloto Bus Station
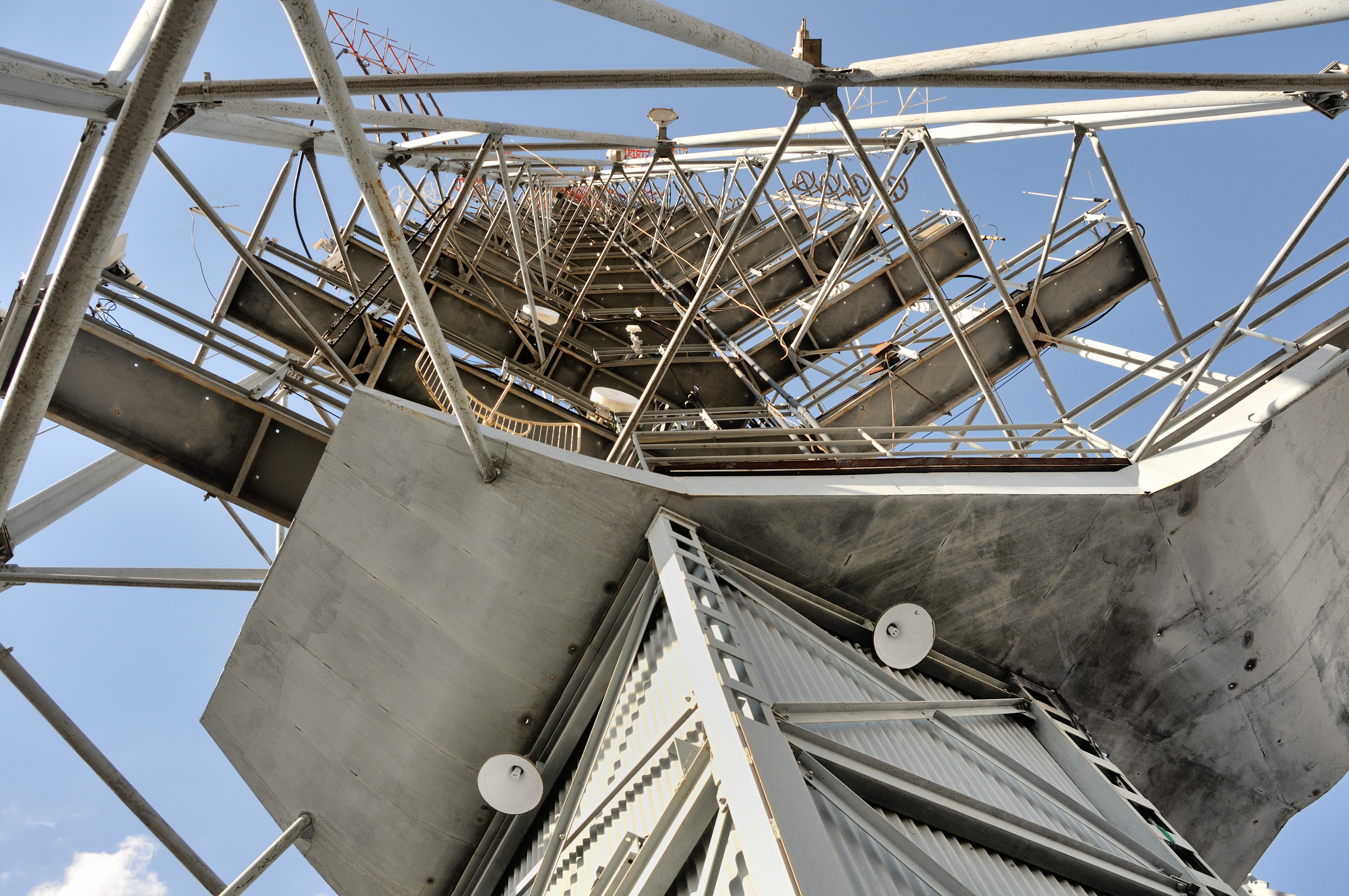
Tower from below inside

== See also ==
- List of towers
