= Monumental Axis =

Avenue in Distrito Federal, Brazil

Coordinates: 15°47′13″S 47°54′13″W

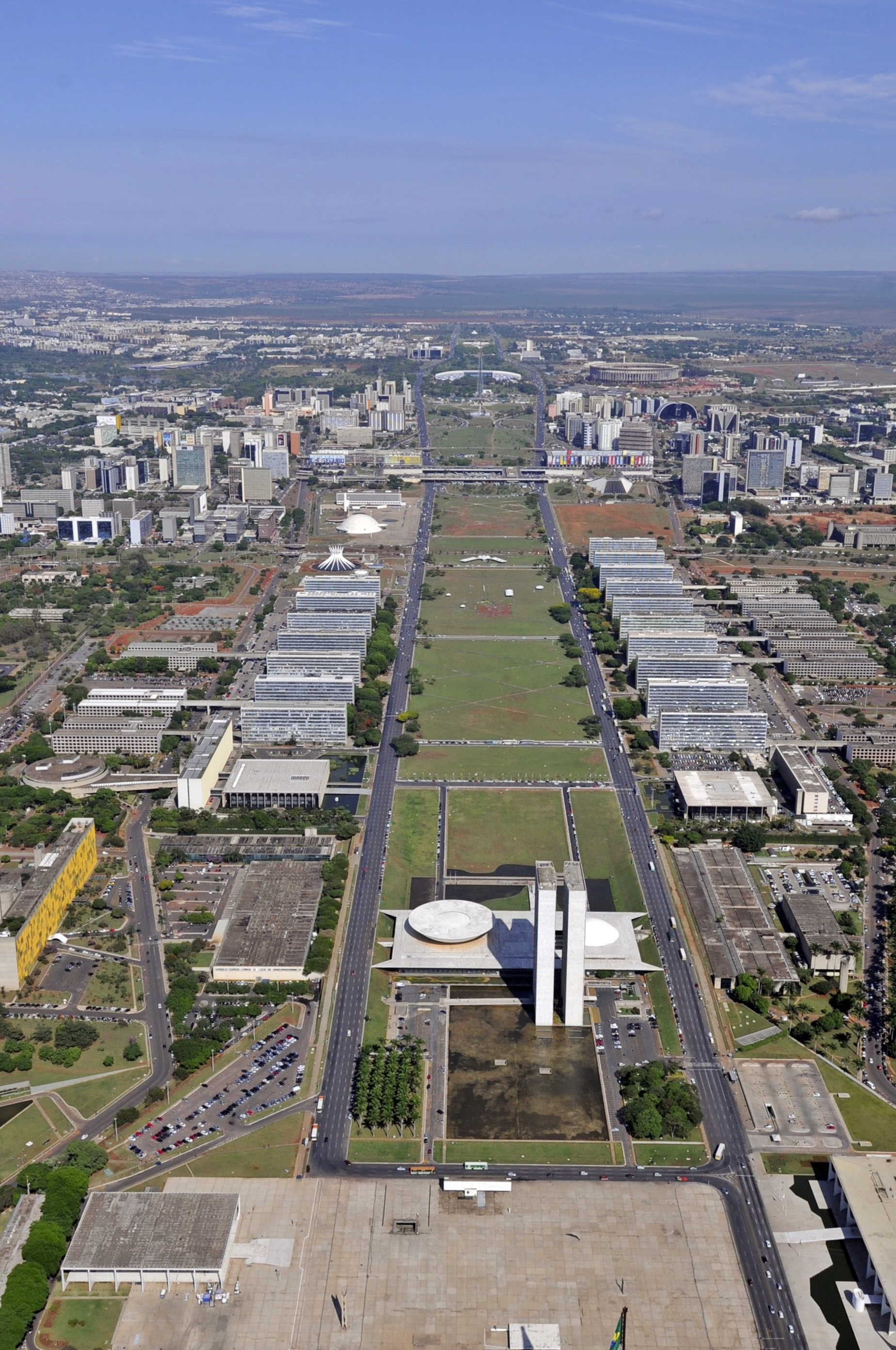
- The Monumental Axis in Brasília seen from sky
- Interactive map of Monumental Axis
- Native name: Eixo Monumental (Brazilian Portuguese)
- Length: 16 km (9.9 mi)
- From: Rodoferroviária de Brasília
- To: Three Powers Plaza

The Monumental Axis (Brazilian Portuguese: Eixo Monumental) is the central and main avenue in Brasília's city design. The avenue begins on the National Congress of Brazil building and is considered part of the DF-002 road. Its first section is known as "Ministries Esplanade" (Esplanada dos Ministérios), as it is surrounded the buildings of government ministries. Many important government buildings, monuments, and memorials are located on the Monumental Axis.

It is 8.5 kilometers long, beginning at the Rodoferroviária de Brasília, and ending at the Praça dos Três Poderes. It was created by Lúcio Costa during the construction of Brasília's Plano Piloto, connecting with the Highway Axis (Eixo Rodoviário) at the Pilot Plan Bus Station.

A common myth persists that the Monumental Axis is the widest road in the world, where "[100 to 160] cars can drive side by side". This is untrue, as the road consists of two avenues with six lanes on either side; a total of twelve lanes. However, the street has been featured in the Guinness Book of Records as having the widest median strip of a highway in the world. On April 21, 2008, a year before they formally broke up, the Mexican pop group RBD performed a free concert to a crowd of 500,000 on the Monumental Axis during Empezar Desde Cero Tour 2008. The show was to celebrate the 48th Anniversary of the founding of Brasília. It was recorded and released on DVD with the title Live in Brasilia. The crowd in attendance was the largest for which the group had performed.

== History ==
The Monumental Axis emerged together with Lúcio Costa's urban planning proposal for the Pilot Plan, submitted to the competition committee for the Pilot Plan for the New Capital of Brazil in 1957. In the justification report, which was considered a decisive factor in his victory, Lúcio describes how he arrived at the design: in item 1, he makes a cross, according to him, a “primary gesture of those who mark a place or take possession of it”. Although the Eixo Monumental is known by the population as the “body of the airplane” due to a popular belief that the Plano Piloto was made in the shape of an aircraft, Lúcio stated in the report that he thought of a cross, and furthermore, the name Plano Piloto was not his creation, being a common term for general plans of modern urbanism.

In the following sections, he curves one of the axes and justifies his choice for it to be the residential axis of the project, leaving the axis that remained straight as the “monumental axis of the system”, calling the avenue by its name for the first time. The two would have opposite and complementary functions: the residential axis would be for everyday, bucolic life, and the monumental axis, as the name suggests, would be for the great monumental palaces, which would symbolize the capital, the institutions and Brazil itself, and would therefore be more open and have a tourist vocation.

After focusing on the details of the road axis, he returns to the monumental axis in item 9, where he describes the ideas for the Three Powers Square, the military and cultural sectors and the Esplanade of Ministries, thought of as a mall - an English term for wide avenues, like the Las Vegas Strip or the National Mall in Washington, D.C. Other inspirations cited in the document are London's Piccadilly Circus, New York's Times Square and Paris' Champs-Élysées Avenue.

Map

== Major sites on the Monumental Axis ==
Photo	Site
	Cathedral of Brasília; Catedral Metropolitana Nossa Senhora Aparecida
	Cultural Complex of the Republic; Complexo Cultural da República (National Museum and National Library)
	Ministries Esplanade; Esplanada dos Ministérios
	Itamaraty Palace; Ministério das Relações Exteriores (Ministry of External Relations)
	National Congress; Congresso Nacional
	Supreme Federal Court; Supremo Tribunal Federal or STF
	Pantheon of the Fatherland and Freedom; Panteão da Pátria e da Liberdade
	JK Memorial; Memorial JK
	Television Tower; Torre de TV de Brasília
	Three Powers Plaza; Praça dos Três Poderes
	Planalto Palace; Palácio do Planalto (Presidential office)
	Justice Palace; Palácio da Justiça (Ministry of Justice)
	States Lane Alameda dos Estados

== Proposals for the area ==
=== Cultural Complex of the Republic ===
The complex, which currently consists of two buildings, the National Museum and the National Library, has plans to build a symphonic concert hall, an opera house, an auditorium for chamber music and possibly two other cultural buildings. However, few initiatives to complete the Complex have taken place to date.

== See also ==
- Brasília
- List of Oscar Niemeyer works
- National Mall
