= Gregori Warchavchik =

Jewish-Brazilian architect

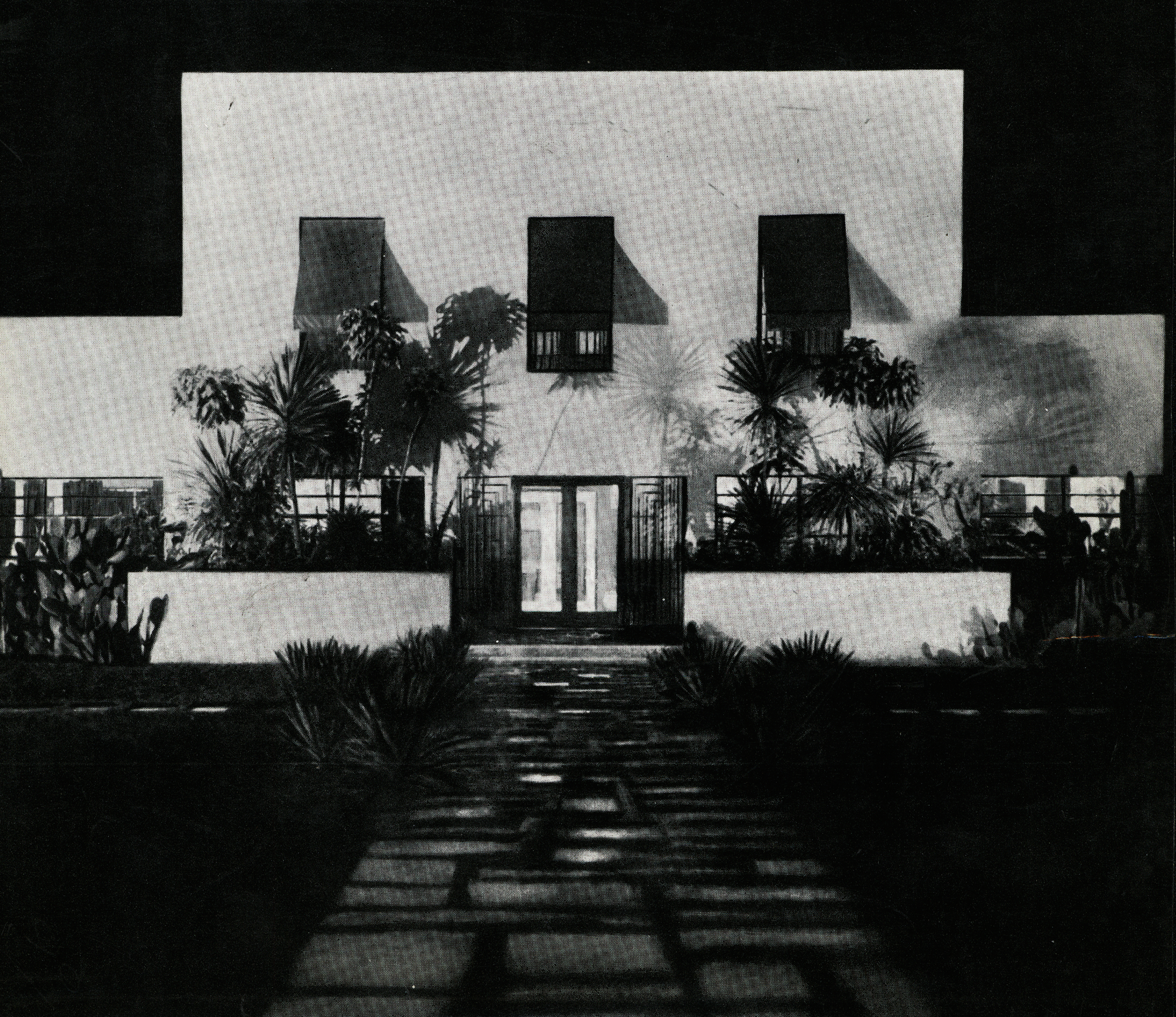
- Gregori Warchavchik, was a Jewish-Brazilian architect.
- Born: Gregori I. Warchavchik; April 2, 1896; Odessa, Russian Empire (now Ukraine)
- Died: July 27, 1972 (aged 76); São Paulo, Brazil
- Occupation: Architect
- Practice: Warchavchik
- Buildings: The First Modern House in Brazil (1927-28)

Gregori I. Warchavchik (Ukrainian: Грегорі Варшавчик; April 2, 1896 – July 27, 1972) was an Imperial Russian-born Brazilian architect of Ashkenazi Jewish origin.

== Early life and education ==
Warchavchik was born in Odessa, which was then part of the Kherson Governorate in the Russian Empire (now Odesa, Ukraine). He was born the first of three children into the wealthy Jewish family of Sofia Podgaetz and Elias Warchavchik. Very little is known about his childhood and Odessa, and much of it is discrepant. Some sources say that he went to a polytechnic school in the city and by 1913 had manifested an interest in architecture, and thus in 1917 began taking architectural courses at Odesa University. He was, during this time, not associated with any of the major artistic renewal movements in Odessa, such as cubofuturism or futurism. While he might've supported the Russian Revolution, he left in the early months of 1918 to Italy, likely due to the political instability of the region and the ongoing pogroms at the time against Jewish people.

He then began to study at the Accademia di Belle Arti di Roma, the Superior Institute of Fine Arts. He studied there during a major reform of Italian architectural education, which merged the technical-scientific training of polytechnic schools with the historical and artistic traditions of fine arts academies to form what was supposed to be an "integral architect". However, he was later critical of his education there, calling the school "very old-fashioned" and saying that it was only able to produce emerging avant-garde artists because they trained through self-directed studies. He graduated in 1920 in an accelerated program and obtained a diploma as a professore di disegno architettonico and a license from the Special Course in Architecture. He then worked as an assistant to the architect Marcello Piacentini (1881-1960), later known as the main proponent of Fascist architecture in Italy. Piacentin assigned him to renovate the Cinema Odeon inside the Palazzo dello Strozzino in Florence, which he did for a year.

== Move to Brazil and São Paulo ==
Warchavchik arrived in Brazil, specifically in the city of São Paulo in 1923. He came there under the recommendation to work at the Companhia Construtora de Santos under industrialist Roberto Simonsen. This move was likely due to the rise of Mussolini in Italy in 1922, and he felt generally unsafe as an Ashkenazi Jew and as a Bolshevik Russian by nationality. After two years in the company, he published one of his most notable works, a document written in Italian for the newspaper Il Piccolo on 14 June 1925 arguing in favor of modernism. This is considered the first document of the Modernist movement in Brazil. A few months later, on 1 November 1925, it was translated into Portuguese in the Correio da Manhã. He argued in the document that every historical era had its own "logic of beauty" (Zeitgeist), and therefore, architecture in 1925 should look like 1925, not 1825. He called the house a "machine for living" and that they should be built like automobiles, and called the "academic" style of using old-fashioned decorations "irrational" and "uneconomic". Lastly, he claimed that traditional decorations had nothing to do with functional reality and sacrificed utility. In 1927, he finally established his own office in São Paulo.

=== Casa Modernista in Santa Cruz ===
In 1927, he began designing the first modernist residence in Brazil, the Casa Modernista da rua Santa Cruz. The house was built to be his personal residence for his family, and was located on Santa Cruz street in the Vila Mariana of São Paulo. Warchavchi's design championed rational plasticity through straight-lined stereometric volumes, not utilizing any facade ornamentation, and using reinforced concrete. This challenged the dominant neocolonial and Art Deco aesthetics in Brazil at the time. Although on the outside, Warchavchik had to use conventional brick masonry for the house, his push for modernity is most present in the interior of the house. There is a highly integrated visual connection between the distribution hall, living, and dining rooms on the first floor, which reflects his use of fluid, continuous social spaces.

After finishing the house in 1928, he only renovated the property once in 1935, adding a marquee and shifting the main entrance to the lateral terrace. The family resided there until the mid-1970s, when they sold the property. In 1983, a construction company wanted to build a luxury residential condominium in the area called the "Palais Versailles", which was opposed by the "Associação Pró-Parque Modernista", which led the house to receive a heritage listing in 1984 by the federal, state, and municipal bodies. However, due to ongoing lawsuits, the property was abandoned until 2000, when work was carried out to restore it until 2008, when the City Hall of the Municipality of São Paulo became the owner of the building.

The reception of the house has been mixed. Critics like architect Carlos Lemos have argued that the house cannot be classified as purely modern due to its use of conventional brick walls, common wooden floorboards, and traditional use of clay roof tiles. Other scholars distinguish between two phases of Brazilian modernism: an early phase, to which Warchavchik belonged, characterized by straight lines and rigid avant-garde forms derived from European models; and a later phase, associated with Oscar Niemeyer, which had curves and structural freedom. These two phases have helped shape a debate over whether Warchavchik merely transplanted European ideas or helped form a uniquely Brazilian modernist architecture.

=== Casa Modernista in Itápolis ===
After finishing the Casa Modernista in Santa Cruz in 1928, he went on to build the Casa Modernista da Rua Itápolis. The house at Itápolis was built throughout 1929, and was visited by architect Le Corbusier during its construction, who said the project was a gesture that contributed to the residence's international visibility and to Warchavchik's reputation. Le Corbusier also invited Warchavchik to be the South American delegate of Congrès Internationaux d'Architecture Moderne (CIAM). It was inaugurated at the Exposição de uma Casa Modernista ("Exhibition of a Modernist House"), which was held from 26 March to 20 April 1930. The house is defined by its interplay of planes, lines, and volumes. Warchavchik used aesthetic clarity, eliminating corridors to maximize usable space, which created a compact but economical floor plan that was subsequently used in residential architecture in São Paulo. It has an asymmetrical composition through the planes sheltering the front veranda, the planes protecting the side entrance, the rear kitchen volume, and the perpendicular lines supporting the pergolas.

The exhibition of the house caused a massive media stir, which he used to expand into appealing to the "old landowning bourgeoisie" about his projects and reaching the market of Rio de Janeiro.

== Rio de Janeiro and teaching ==
Soon after the Revolution of 1930, architect Lúcio Costa, who was then head of the National School of Fine Arts, invited Warchavchik to Rio de Janeiro to work at the school as a professor of architecture. He was likely hired because of the "radical transformation" advocated by Costa in the teaching of architecture.

=== Career decline ===
He designed the Lasar Segall Museum in São Paulo that opened in 1967. In 1930 he and Lucio Costa established a joint architecture studio in Rio de Janeiro, and one of the designers in the studio between 1932 and 1936 was the then young architectural student, Oscar Niemeyer.

== Personal life ==
He married Mina Klabin in 1927, daughter of a prominent industrialist in São Paulo, and became a naturalized Brazilian.

Warchavchik died in São Paulo in 1972.

== Works ==
- 1927 - Casa da Rua Santa Cruz, São Paulo
- 1929 - Casa Modernista, Tomé de Sousa Street, São Paulo
- 1930 - Casa Modernista, Itápolis Street, São Paulo
- - Casa Modernista, Bahia Street, São Paulo
- 1931 - Casa Modernista do Rio, Rio de Janeiro
- 1932 - Casa Lasar Segall, now the Museum of Lasar Segall
- 1933 - Residência Duarte Coelho, Rio de Janeiro
- 1933 - Vila Operária da Gamboa, Rio de Janeiro

== See also ==
- Centro Cultural e de Estudos Superiores Aúthos Pagano
