= Philippe Boisnard =

French writer (born 1971)

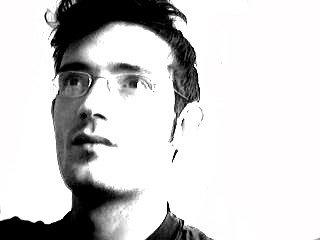
- Born: 18 July 1971 (age 54); Paris, France
- Education: Philosophy
- Known for: Writer, multimedia performer, poet
- Movement: Digital
- Awards: Grand Prix multimedia of SGDL

Philippe Boisnard (born 18 July 1971) is a French writer and multimedia artist practicing performance art.

== Biography ==
=== Writer ===
Boisnard studied philosophy at the Paris Sorbonne University where he participated in journalistic ventures. All of that led him to become a teacher and he began by publishing criticizing and theoretical papers in magazines such as Le Philosophoire, La Revue d'Esthétique ("The Journal of Aesthetics") (ed. Jean-Michel Place) or Respublica (PUF), and then wrote regularly between 2002 and 2006 in Libération, a famous French magazine. Essayist, he has worked on philosophical dictionaries and several anthologies, and in parallel gave a big number of conferences. Literary-minded person and art critic, having published in magazines and on websites, he created in 2005 with Fabrice Thumerel « libr-critique.com» (free-criticism.com), a website dedicated to creative writings and contemporary poetry in all its forms. He published his first book of poetry, Dégoût en corps ("Disgust as a body"), in 2000, followed by Préface des aléas ("Preface of hazards"), in 2001 and, in 2007, C'est à dire ("That is to say"). In parallel, he published journals excerpts of his works ("The International Review of books and ideas", "JAVA", "Rockets", "Hermaphrodite", "PlastiQ", "The voice of view", "The Female Shark", etc..) and still gave numerous lectures in France. In 2007, he published his first novel "Pan Cake", for which he was invited to the 11th International Book Fair of Tanger. An excerpt from “Atom-Z, we are 6 billion”, was adapted for the stage in the creation of “Espaces Indicibles” (“spaces untold”) in 2007, a play directed by Gagnère Georges and Franck Laroze.

=== Multimedia artist ===
Since 2000, he directed works of videopoetry mixing poetry and multimedia arts and performance of vidéopoetry in both Modern Art Museums and festivals. From 2004, he designed exhibitions or installations (Modern Art Museum of Saint-Étienne France, Artcore gallery in Paris, etc..), Websites for literary or artistic structures and performances on Internet such as "War-Z News - Iraq under attack" during the invasion of Iraq. From 2006, he has been involved in computer programming for art. That led him to carry out many works for artists and to be invited to the International Convention called Pure Data of São Paulo in 2009. In 2008 he published "Petites Annonces", a multimedia DVD in the collection Le point sur le I ("the dot on the i"), ed. Incidences. The same year, he was invited twice to São Paulo, first for the convention of Pure Data and then for the year of France in Brazil. In 2011 he was invited to the 27th International of Contemporary Music Festival (FIMAV) in Victoriaville (Quebec) with Jean Voguet. He exhibited SIK-K an installation created with Lucille Calmel in the context of the European Month of Photography in Luxembourg and he was the programmer artist of the play called Au bord du gouffre ("On the edge of the abyss"), staged byLucille Calmel at Théâtre des Tanneurs in Brussels. In 2012: he is the creator and programmer of the complete multimedia device, for the play L'Argent ("Silver") directed by Anne Théron, from Christophe Tarkos’ text and produced by the Gaite Lyrique theater of Paris. This multimedia work led him to collaborate with other artists such as : Donguy Jacques, Pierre Nguyen, Yann Kerninon, Jean Voguet, Michel Giroud, Lucille Calmel, Julien Blaine, Joel Hubaut, Hortense Gauthier, Giney Ayme, Jean-Marc Monterra, Jacques Sivan, Stephane Oertli.

In 2007, he was awarded "Le Grand Prix de l'oeuvre multimedia" ("The best multimedia work") of the SGDLF (Society of Men of Letters of France) for the creation of the website « x-tr-m-art.com ».

== Expositions ==
Personal expositions

- Galerie L'Hôtel, exposition organisée par l'École supérieure d'arts et médias de Caen - Cherbourg|École des Beaux Arts de Caen, Festival Insterstices (2008)
- Hôtel de Guigne-Maison Folie, Arras, Salon du livre populaire (2006)
- Hôtel de Guigne-Maison Folie, Arras, Salon du livre populaire (2005)

Collective expositions

- Festival Mai Numérique, Carcassonne, en collaboration avec Hortense Gauthier, 2013
- Festival Digital Choc, Tokyo, Kyoto, Fukuoka, en collaboration avec Hortense Gauthier, 2013
- Festival les Bains Numériques, Enghien les Bains, en collaboration avec Hortense Gauthier, 2012
- Festival ISI, Montpellier, en collaboration avec Hortense Gauthier, 2011
- Le Casino, Luxembourg, Mois européen de la photographie, en collaboration avec Lucille Calmel, 2011
- Festival Les voix de la Méditerranée, Lodève, 2010
- Poésie expérimentale - Zone Numérique, Casa Das Rosas, São Paulo, Année de la France au Brésil, 2008
- Festival L'art des corps, Lagorce, 2008
- Galerie Eof, Paris, Leurre, 2006
- Galerie Artcore, Paris, 2004
- Musée d'art moderne de Saint-Étienne, Après la mort de l'art, 2003
- Terminal Zone, Hérouville-Saint-Clair, 2002
