= Centro Cultural e de Estudos Superiores Aúthos Pagano =

Brazilian cultural institution in São Paulo

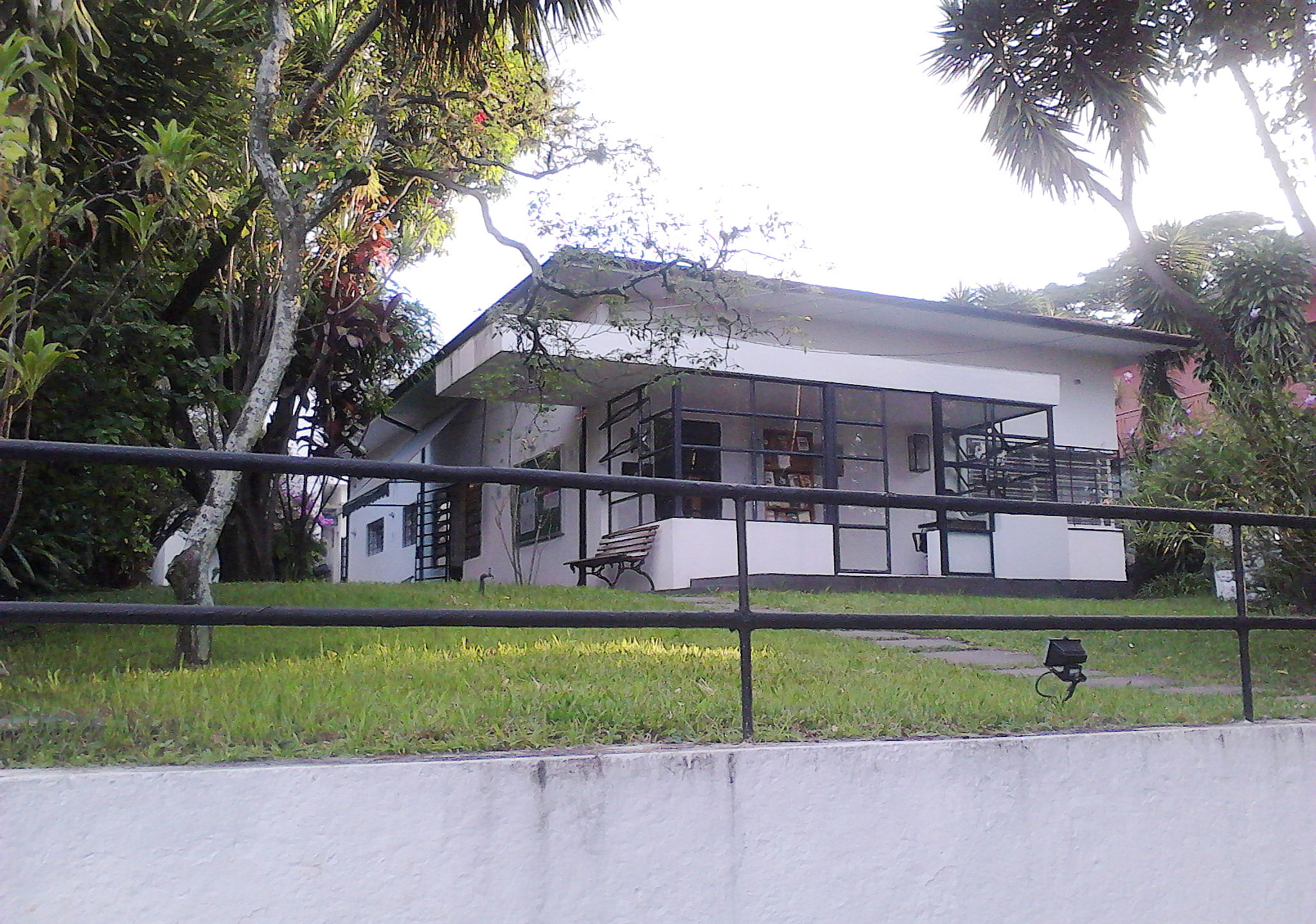
- Façade of house, built in the 1929.
- Established: 1982
- Location: São Paulo, São Paulo (state), Brazil
- Coordinates: 23°31′37″S 46°42′56″W
- Type: Cultural center
- Architect: Gregori Warchavchik
- Website: www.centroculturalauthospagano.org.br

The Centro Cultural e de Estudos Superiores Aúthos Pagano (CCESAP) (English: Aúthos Pagano Higher Studies and Cultural Center) is a Brazilian cultural institution located in the Alto da Lapa neighborhood in the city of São Paulo. It is a state public organization, maintained by the Secretariat of Culture and Creative Economy of the State of São Paulo (SEC) and administered jointly with a civil society organization (Pensarte Institute).

The CCESAP was founded on May 11, 1982, on the initiative of lawyer Carmela Antonia Danna Pagano, widow of Uruguayan-Brazilian academic Aúthos Pagano (1909–1976), with the aim of preserving the memory and work of the institution's patron. It is based in the couple's former residence, one of the first modernist houses in Brazil, designed by Gregori Warchavchik in 1929 and protected by municipal law since 1978.

The institution preserves Aúthos Pagano's personal library, consisting of more than 10,000 titles, covering areas such as law, economics, statistics, mathematics, astronomy, and physics; in addition to the original furniture, personal objects and works of art that belonged to the academic and his wife. It maintains a permanent agenda of cultural and educational activities, organizing courses, lectures, debates, performances and a choral singing workshop. It is equipped with a small auditorium, with capacity for 60 people.

== The patron ==
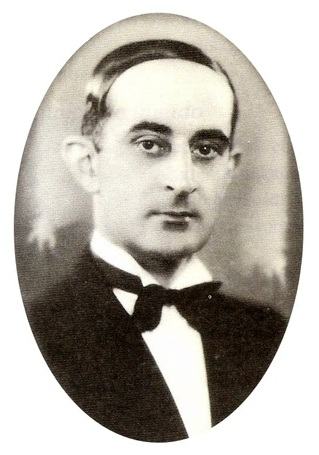
Aúthos Pagano's portrait

Aúthos Pagano was born in Montevideo, Uruguay, on September 21, 1909, and moved with his family to Brazil as a child after his father's death. He graduated in economics at the School of Economic Sciences of Fundação Escola de Comércio Álvares Penteado (FECAP) in 1936, and later became professor and director of this institution. He also took a philosophy course at the School of Philosophy, Sciences and Literature of the University of São Paulo (Faculdade de Filosofia, Ciências e Letras da Universidade de São Paulo FFCL-USP). In 1939, he presented the first PhD thesis in economics defended in Brazil, called "O Coeficiente Instantâneo de Mortalidade", which later earned him an honorary degree from the University of Havana.

Aúthos was for many years a professor at the School of Economic Sciences at the Mackenzie Presbyterian University. He also studied law at the same university, and later earned a PhD in legal sciences from the University of São Paulo and the University of Montevideo. He, in addition, directed the Statistics Division of the Municipality of São Paulo in the 1950s; wrote, as an amateur, articles on astronomy published in several national and foreign journals; and participated in several academies and associations, including The Econometric Tensor Society of Japan, of which he was a representative for many years.

Aúthos has published twelve books and more than 2,500 articles on varied subjects in the fields of economics, statistics, philosophy, law, astronomy, etc. He is the author, among others, of "Lições de Estatística", the most extensive work on the subject ever written in Portuguese and an important basic reference in the statistics teaching in Brazil. It was awarded by the Institute of Actuaries of London in 1956 and widely disseminated in international academia at the time. After his death in 1976, several tributes were paid, including speeches given in the Legislative Assembly of São Paulo and in the Historical and Geographical Institute of São Paulo.

== The institution ==
The CCESAP was created by the initiative of the wife of the institution's patron, the lawyer Carmela Antonia Danna Pagano. After Aúthos' death, Carmela considered donating the collection to the University of São Paulo. The USP, however, had imposed the condition of dispersing the collection, distributing the volumes among its various specialized libraries, which went against Carmela's will to maintain the integrity and identity of the collection, and thus perpetuate her husband's memory and work. She then opted to create a cultural center: a place for studies, research, conferences, and educational activities, to be based in the couple's old residence at Tomé de Sousa Street, in Alto da Lapa, one of the first modernist buildings in São Paulo, designed by Gregori Warchavchik in 1929.

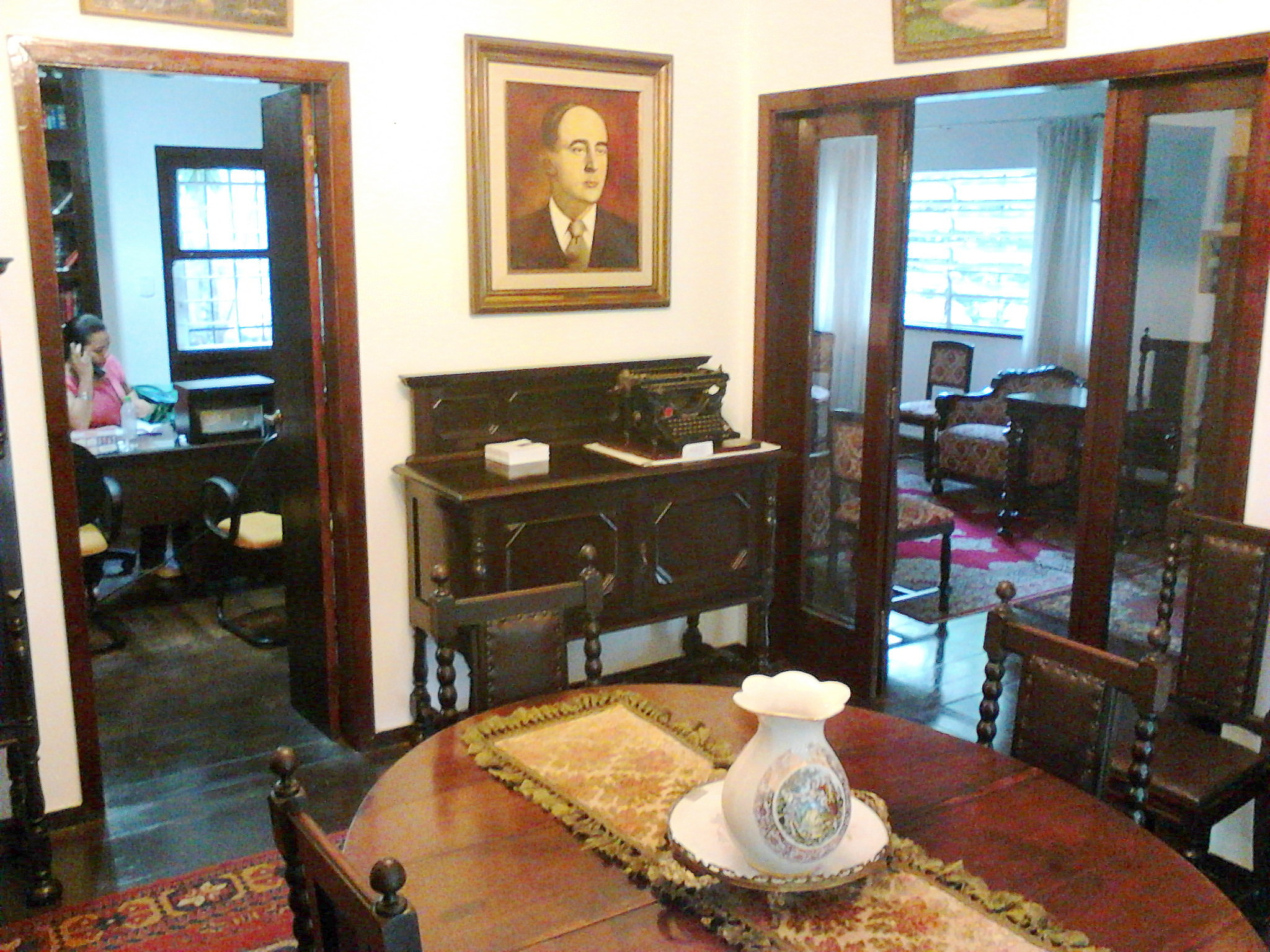
Room in the house

The zoning law then in force, however, prevented any type of non-residential occupation on the mentioned street. After the approval of Municipal Law nº 8,759, in 1978, the property was included in a list of preserved assets due to its historical and aesthetic characteristics, and its destination for non-residential purposes was also authorized. On May 11, 1982, after prolonged negotiations, Carmela donated the residence, the land and all the bibliographical collection, furniture and other objects to the Government of the State São Paulo, then managed by Paulo Maluf, to create the cultural center.

The new institution became subordinated to Public Archives of the State of São Paulo and Carmela was invited to collaborate in its direction. The inaugural lecture was delivered by Professor Elza Mazzonetto Machado. Sílvia Alice Antibas took over as curator. On January 28, 1985, Governor Franco Montoro, through Decree nº 23,231, defined the attributions of the CCESAP: "it is intended for exhibitions and artistic/cultural presentations, as well as activities related to culture, science and education, through research, courses, lectures and other activities, and it should especially preserve and maintain its assets and library, making the latter available to the public".

The years immediately after the foundation of the cultural center were dedicated to the identification, cataloging and organization of the bibliographic, iconographic and documentary collection; and to adapting the space to receive visitors. Attached to the residence, a small auditorium with 60 seats was built to host the cultural activities promoted by the institution. The Associação de Amigos do CCESAP (AACCESAP) was also founded, with the aim of helping to raise funds and carry out activities in the space. Alberto Neves was the provisional president of the association during the statute's drafting, and Paulo Toledo Machado was elected the first effective president in 1994.

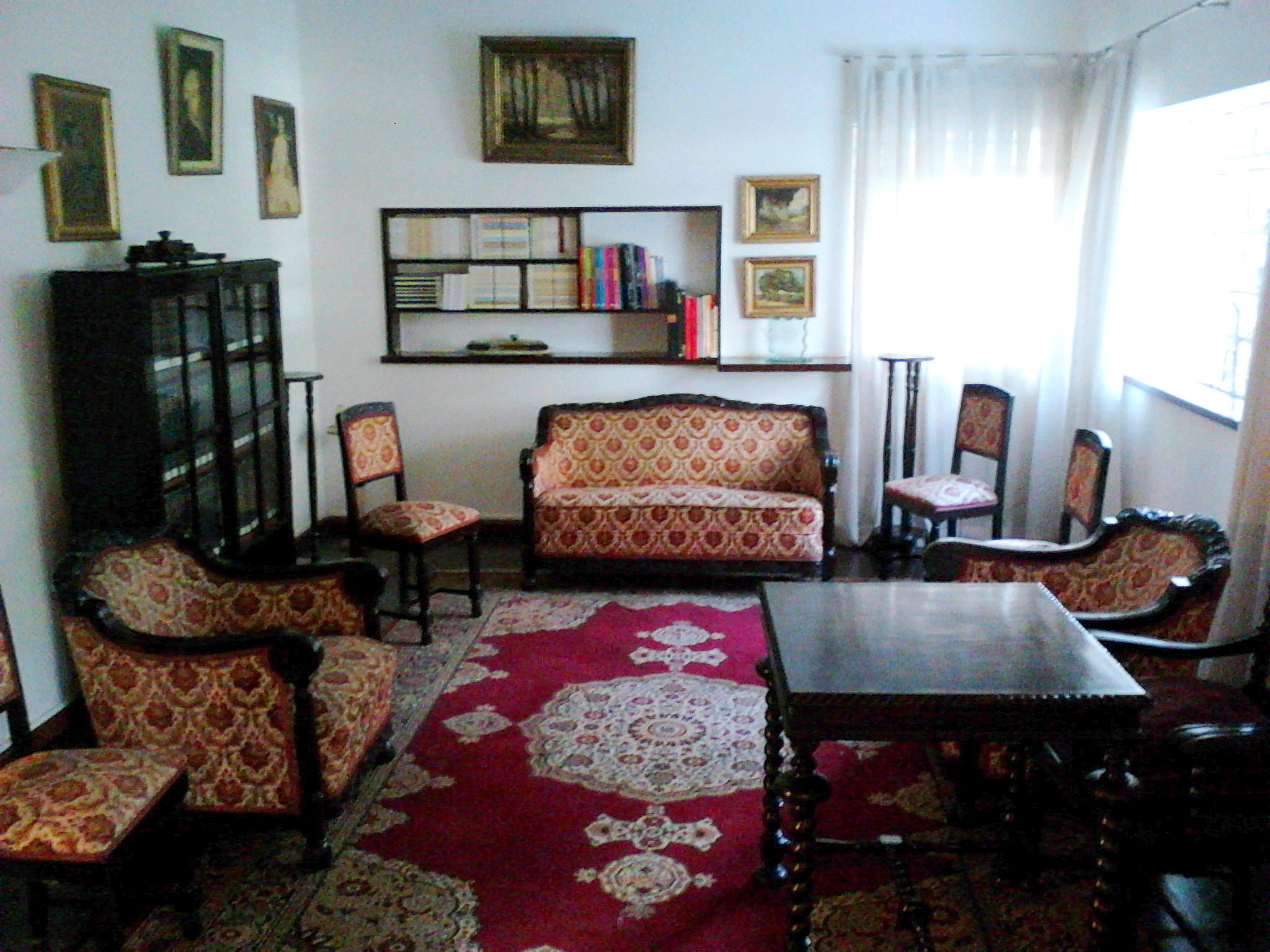
Room in the house

In the late 1990s, the CCESAP was closed for renovations. The reopening took place on June 28, 2000, with an exhibition of 81 old works of the bibliographic collection, produced from the 18th century on and including six rare copies, besides publications, manuscripts and newspaper articles authored by Aúthos. On that same year, the first edition of "Café Filosófico" was held, an event that would occur regularly throughout the following decade.

In November 2004, after changes in the cultural policy during the Geraldo Alckmin administration, the state transferred the administration of the cultural center to the Associação Paulista dos Amigos da Arte (APAA), a social organization financed with public funds, also responsible for the management of other public cultural facilities. The new management reformulated the center's cultural programming, aiming to make it more active. In 2006, the program "Conversa com Verso", an interactive soiree about music and poetry, was created. In 2007, on the occasion of the CCESAP's 25th anniversary, the Aúthos Pagano Choir was founded. Theater classes were also created, aimed at children and teenagers (in the morning and afternoon periods) and adults (in the evening period), and the weekly biodanza workshop was inaugurated .

In 2008, João Sayad, secretary of culture during the José Serra administration, sent a legislative proposal aiming to transfer the management of the cultural center to São Paulo City Hall, as had been done with the "Casa Modernista" of Vila Mariana. The project faced resistance from Carmela Pagano and the AACCESAP, under the argument that the deed had clauses that would make the donation impossible, and that the characteristics of the bibliographic heritage kept in the space would not be compatible with the municipal public library network. The project was not taken forward.

In 2010, Pensarte Institute took over the administration of the space, after the contract between the Government of the State São Paulo and APAA ended. Alcione Cedraz took over the direction of the center. The institute expanded the permanent cultural agenda, including singing workshops and an interactive course on the history of Música Popular Brasileira (MPB). In 2012, in celebration of its 30th anniversary, the CCESAP hosted performances by the Orquestra Paulistana de Viola Caipira, a theatrical show inspired by the biography and literary work of Patrícia Galvão, as well as lectures and soirees.

== The house ==
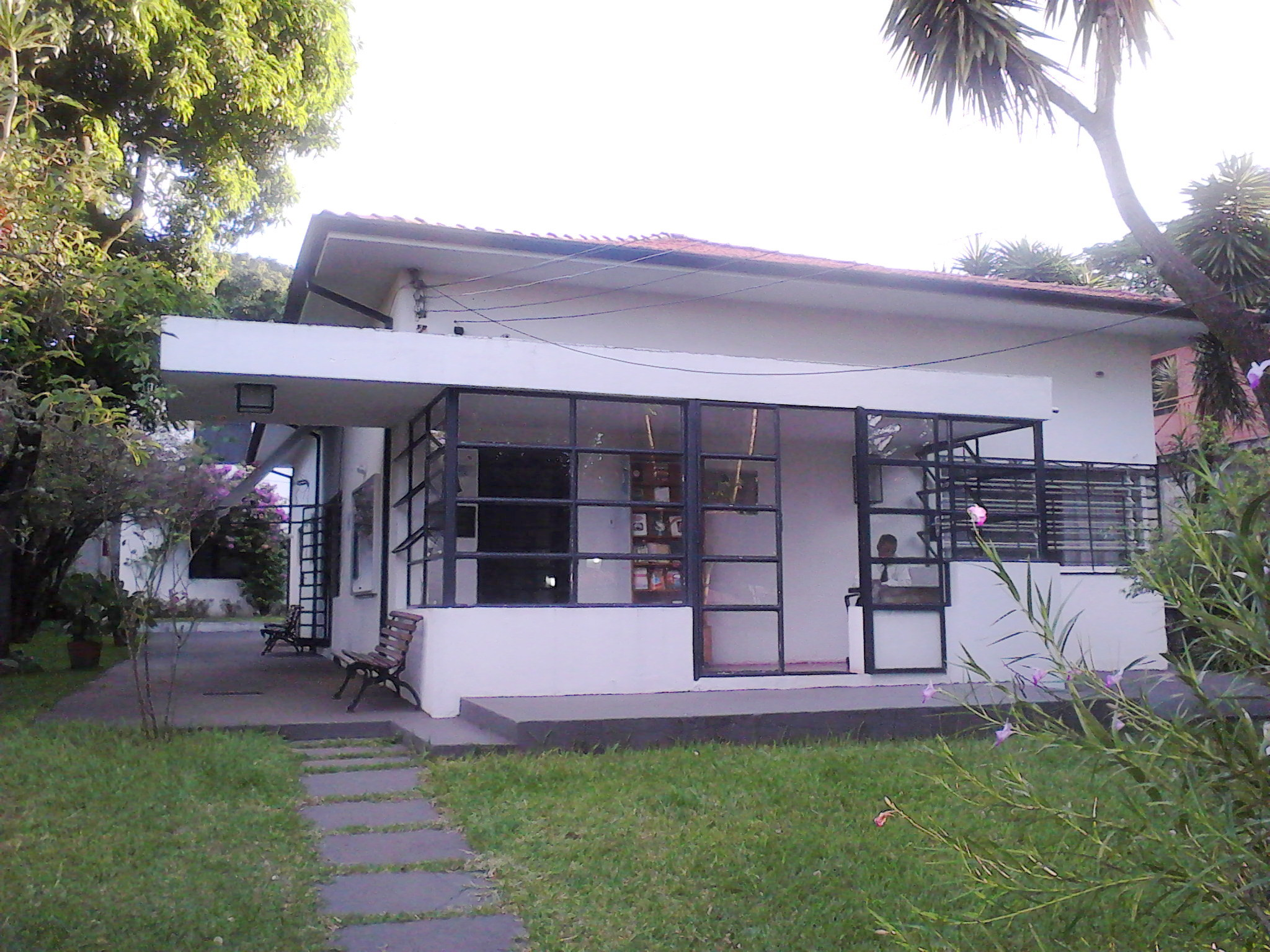
Façade of the residence

The house at Tomé de Sousa Street where the CCESAP is located was built in 1929 and designed by Gregori Warchavchik, a Russian-born architect who was part of the first Brazilian modernist generation. It is cited as the third modernist residence in São Paulo, after the buildings in Vila Mariana and Higienópolis, both also by Warchavchik. It is also one of the first houses built in the region then called "City Lapa", designed by the English urban planner Barry Parker and built by Companhia City, seeking to privilege wide streets, tree-lined sidewalks, and spacious houses with large gardens. The contractor was the ophthalmologist doctor Cândido da Silva, who had purchased the land of approximately 900 m^{2} from Companhia City, which in turn had bought it from the French immigrant Édouard Fontaine de Laveleye in 1912.

The residence follows the patterns of rationalist architecture (international style) and, like the other houses that emerged in this context, it has faced difficulties related to the impossibility of acquiring, from the local market, the industrialized elements necessary for the new architectural languages. It is a rectangular, single-story building with a clean, white-painted look. Warchavchik had originally used a concrete slab to create a terrace-garden, but this element was later replaced by a traditional roof. Other modifications were also made, such as closing the border terrace with a glass frame and adding a garage, originally not planned. The house, however, is in a good state of preservation, and the modifications do not reach to alter the original design of the project. It is surrounded by a garden, with species of local flora, foliage, jabuticaba trees, lemon trees, roses, etc.

The house was acquired by Aúthos and Carmela Pagano in 1963, still in the name of Cândido da Silva. At first the couple did not consider researching the origin or the historical and architectural value of the house, but decided to buy it because the property was on the first floor, had a large garden, and was located in a quiet neighborhood, with a flat topography and many trees. They lived there for thirteen years, until Aúthos' death in 1976. The house, with the library and all its objects and furniture were donated by Carmela to the Government of the State São Paulo on May 11, 1982, the same date on which the CCESAP was created.

The building has been protected since 1978 by virtue of Municipal Law nº 8,759, sanctioned by Mayor Olavo Setubal, due to its architectural and historical relevance. It underwent a renovation in the late 1990s.

== Collection and activities ==
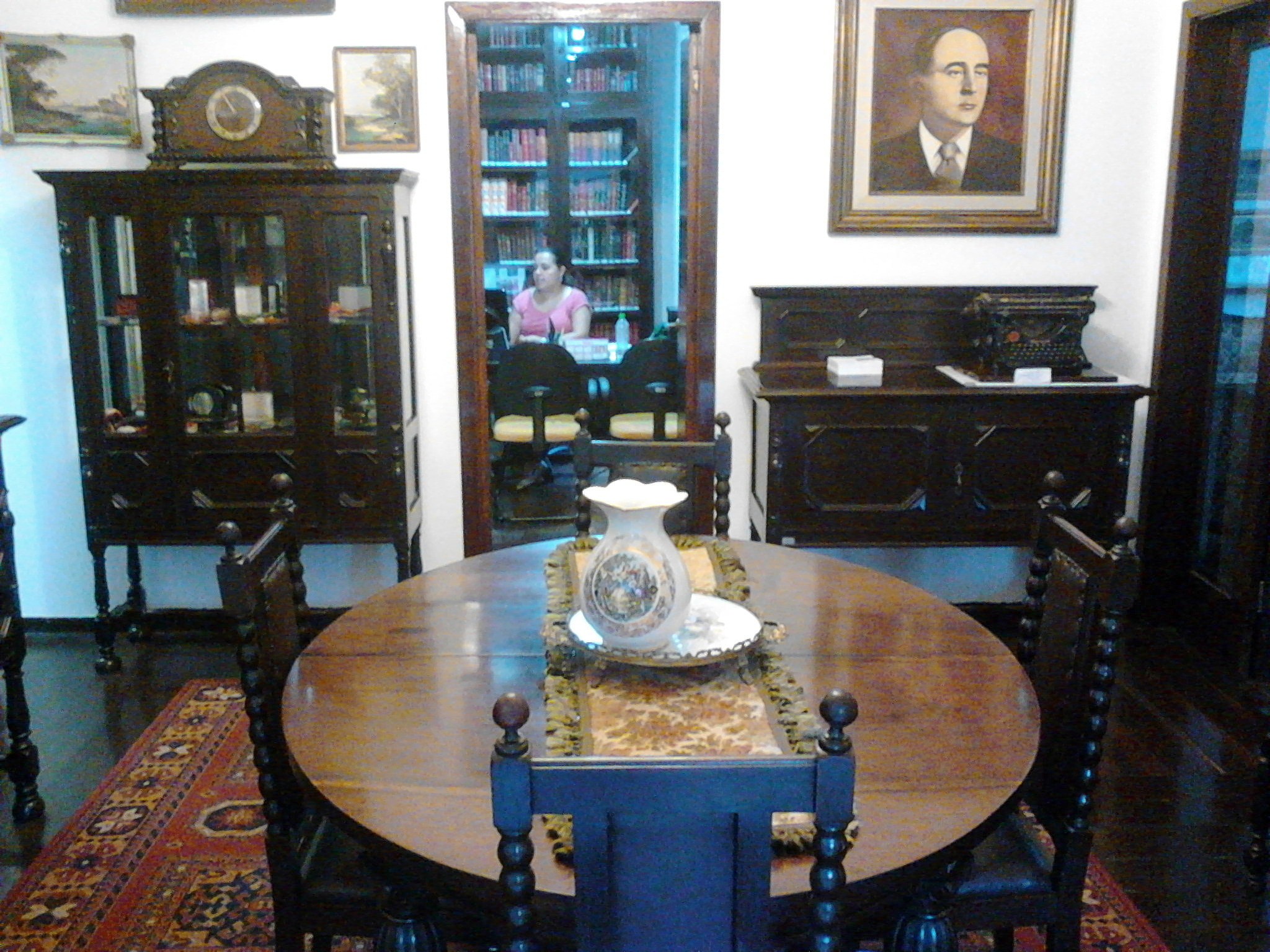
View of the residence

The library of the CCESAP holds more than 10,000 titles dealing with varied subjects such as economics, mathematics, statistics, law, physics, astronomy, and philosophy. The collection includes a large number of old books, from the 18th, 19th, and 20th centuries, including rare works and first editions. Most of the works are scientific and academic titles, with several copies in foreign languages, mainly English, French and Spanish.

Aúthos made frequent purchases of books in Brazil and used foreign establishments like the Cambridge bookstore W. Heffer & Sons Ltd to acquire works that were more difficult to access on the domestic market, such as the collection of Adam Smith's complete works, acquired from that bookstore; thirteen copies in different languages of "The Wealth of Nations"; and the complete collection of "La Grande Encyclopédie". During his trips to Uruguay, he used to acquire titles at Barreiro y Ramos and M. Lamas bookstores.

The collection also includes newspapers, magazines, the twelve books authored by Aúthos and thousands of articles published in several journals. The documentary collection consists of a large number of manuscripts and correspondence exchanged with various scholars such as Nilo Berchesi, Uruguay's Finance minister, and Professors Joseph Fayet and Octavio Morató Rodríguez, as well as a photographic archive, albums, booklets, etc.

The residence preserves the original furniture used by the Pagano, such as the mahogany turned leg table, brought from Montevideo when Aúthos' family moved to Brazil; the accompanying Austrian chair; as well as the Underwood typewriter, used in the production of much of his work. There are also works of art, including a drawing of Aúthos on a notebook sheet done by his friend Menotti Del Picchia during a dinner in Mogi Mirim, and a drawing of the house, done by the painter Edih; and the "wise men gallery", a collection of 84 engravings depicting great exponents of the sciences, such as Copernicus, Kepler, Kant, Laplace, Lagrange, Poincaré, Einstein, and Aristotle, among others.

The CCESAP maintains a permanent agenda of small cultural events, such as theater classes, musical performances, choral singing, workshops, poetry recitals, soirees, courses such as "History of MPB", philosophical debates, lectures, book launches and small exhibitions.

== See also ==
- Gregori Warchavchik
- Richard Barry Parker
- Casa das Rosas
- Rationalism (architecture)
- International Style (architecture)

== Bibliography ==
- Pagano, Carmela Antonia Danna (2010). Aúthos Pagano. O intelectual, a obra, o homem (in Portuguese) (2nd ed.). São Paulo: Scortecci. ISBN 978-85-366-0369-8. OCLC 69931396.
