= Vila Operária da Gamboa =

- Location within Rio de Janeiro
- Alternative names: Vila Gamboa

General information
- Status: Completed
- Architectural style: Modernist
- Location: Rua Barão da Gamboa 158-160, Santo Cristo, Rio de Janeiro, Brazil
- Coordinates: 22.900597°S 43.198978°W
- Construction started: 1931
- Opened: 1933

Height
- Architectural: Modernist

Technical details
- Floor count: 2

Design and construction
- Architects: Lúcio Costa, Gregori Warchavchik

Other information
- Number of rooms: 14

Vila Operária da Gamboa (English: Workers' Village of Gamboa) is an apartment building in Rio de Janeiro, Brazil. It is located in the Santo Cristo neighborhood near the Gamboa waterfront area of the city. It was designed by Lúcio Costa (1902-1998) in 1931 during his three-year partnership with Gregori Warchavchik, and completed in 1933. The goal of modernists in Brazil was to build for the working class, and Vila Operária Gamboa is the first modernist building constructed for the poor in Brazil.

Vila Operária da Gamboa was built on a narrow, irregular parcel of land. It is located on the north side of Rua Barão da Gamboa at the intersection of Rua Cardoso Marinho on land ceded to the project by Dr. Fábio Carneiro de Mendoça. The technology for modern construction was at an early stage in Brazil and workers in Rio de Janeiro lacked the technical skills to work with concrete, steel, and stone. Warchavchik brought workers from his modernist projects in São Paulo to complete the building.

The structure consists of fourteen units on two floor. Twelve were full apartments of 30 square metres (320 ft^{2}) with a living room and two bedrooms. Two were simple studio apartments of 10 square metres (110 ft^{2}), and were meant to serve as homes for the "concierges" or janitors of the building. The façade of the building was painted in vivid green and tan with the walkway banister painted in white. In its style it resembles early 20th-century residences of Louis Bourgeois and Cliff May.

Vila Operária da Gamboa remains standing but is in a state of advanced dilapidation. It is a listed building of the City of Rio de Janeiro (Bens Tombados No Município Do Rio De Janeiro), designated as such in 1986.
