= Richard Barry Parker =

English architect and urban planner

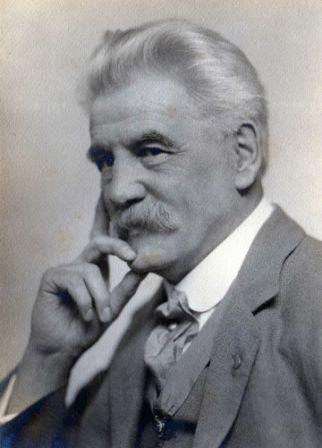
Parker in 1942

Richard Barry Parker (18 November 1867 – 21 February 1947) was an English architect and urban planner associated with the Arts and Crafts Movement. He was primarily known for his architectural partnership with Raymond Unwin.

== Biography ==
Parker was born in Chesterfield in 1867, the son of bank manager Robert Parker. He trained at T.C. Simmonds Atelier of Art in Derby and the studio of George Faulkner Armitage in Altrincham. In 1891 he joined his father in Buxton and designed three large houses for him there.

In 1896 Parker went into partnership with Raymond Unwin, who was Parker's half cousin as well as his brother-in-law, having married his sister Ethel in 1893.

One of their earliest commissions was to design and build a large family home on farming land in Clayton Staffordshire, for a local manufacturer of pottery, Charles Frederick Goodfellow. Finished in 1899 the house gave them the opportunity to incorporate many internal and external features including an open, galleried courtyard, and custom furniture and fittings in Arts and Crafts style in many rooms.

Originally, as was the custom, named the Goodfellow House, when it was bought in 1926 by another Potteries manufacturer, Colley Shorter (Arthur Colley Austin Shorter, 1882 to 1963) he renamed it Chetwynd House, and that name remains with it to today. Shorter's second wife was the British ceramic designer Clarice Cliff, and it is with her that the house is now most closely identified, as she worked extensively on the large gardens with Shorter for many of her retirement years, and after his death.

They collaborated on architectural writing including The Art of Building a Home (1901), applying the Arts and Crafts Movement to working-class housing.

In 1902 they were asked to design a model village at New Earswick near York for Joseph and Benjamin Seebohm Rowntree, and the following year they were given the opportunity to take part in the creation of Letchworth, when the First Garden City Company asked them to submit a plan. Two other pairs of architects (W. R. Lethaby & Halsey Ricardo and Geoffry Lucas & Sidney Cranfield) also submitted plans.

In 1903 they were involved with the "Cottages Near a Town Exhibit" for the Northern Art Workers Guild of Manchester. In 1904 after their plan for Letchworth was adopted they opened a second office at Baldock moving to a purpose-built office in Letchworth in 1907. In 1905 they were invited by Henrietta Barnett to design the new Hampstead Garden Suburb, working in association with Edwin Lutyens. Unwin left Letchworth for Hampstead in 1906 leaving Parker to continue the work in Letchworth where, in addition to having a supervision role, the design of some 275 dwellings and a number of public buildings is credited to the Parker & Unwin partnership.

In May 1914 the partnership of Parker & Unwin was dissolved, as Unwin became increasingly involved with public sector work. Parker continued his town planning practice, advising on Porto, Portugal in 1915 and São Paulo, Brazil in 1917–1919. From 1927 he advised the Manchester City Council on the development of Wythenshawe, where he had a continuing role until 1941. He died at Letchworth in 1947 at the age of 79. Parker became a Quaker toward the end of his life.

Parker was an admirer of the American parkways, notably those in Westchester County, hence the prominence given to Princess Parkway in the Wythenshawe plan. His Presidential Address to the Town Planning Institute in 1929 shows his desire to create parkways in Britain, partly as an answer to the problem of ribbon development on newly built main roads.

== See also ==
- Centro Cultural e de Estudos Superiores Aúthos Pagano

== Sources ==
- DSA Architect Biography Report: Parker & Unwin
- Richard Barry Parker, A Dictionary of Architecture and Landscape Architecture, Oxford University Press.

Richard Barry Parker in libraries (WorldCat catalog)
