= Mina Klabin Warchavchik =

Brazilian landscape architect (1896–1969)

- Born: Mina Klabin; 1896; Brazil
- Died: 1969
- Occupation: Landscape architects
- Known for: Landscape design, use of native tropical plants
- Spouse: Gregori Warchavchik
- Children: 2

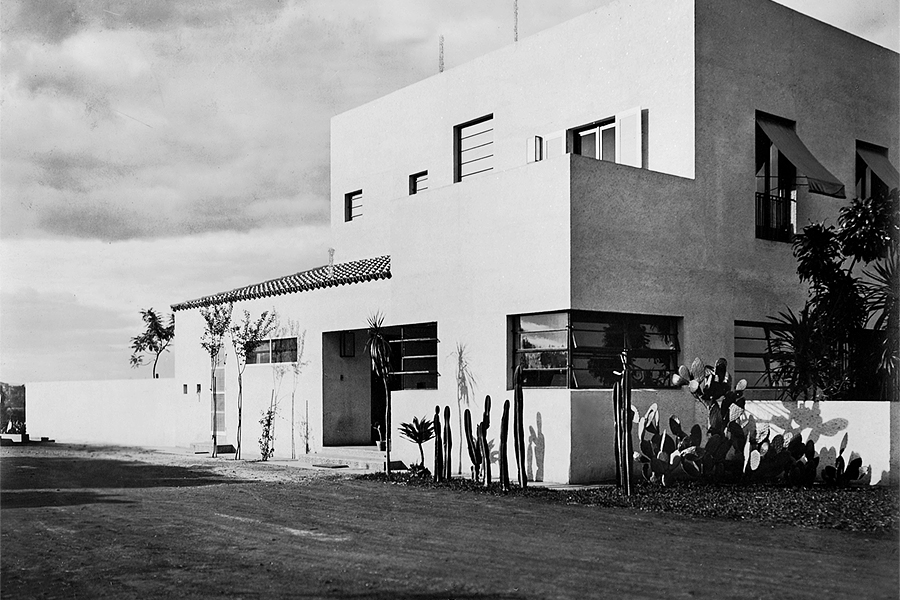
Casa da Rua Santa Cruz, Mina Klabin Warchavchik's native Brazilian gardens added character and excitement to the modernist buildings designed by her husband.

Mina Klabin Warchavchik (1896 – 1969) was a Brazilian landscape architect

known for designing modern and abstract gardens composed of plants native to Southern Brazil. She created gardens surrounding homes designed by her husband, Brazilian modernist architect Gregori Warchavchik.

== Biography ==
=== Family history ===
Mina Klabin was the eldest daughter of Bertha Obstrand and Maurício Freeman Klabin, a Lithuanian-Jewish immigrant who fled the Russian Empire. Her father had purchased property in Lithuania despite a decree from Czar Alexander III barring Jews from owning any land.

After being outed to the authorities he and other Jewish refugees made a long journey on foot to one of the Baltic ports, where he escaped to Britain. He later left for Brazil in search of better opportunities. Soon after his arrival in São Paulo, Freeman Klabin began working in a book making factory which he would later come to own. After reaching financial stability, Klabin was able to bring his then fiancé Bertha Obstrand and the rest of his family to join him in São Paulo. The Klabins would become a prominent São Paulo family, founding the stationery and supply company Klabin Irmãos & Cia.

=== Childhood ===
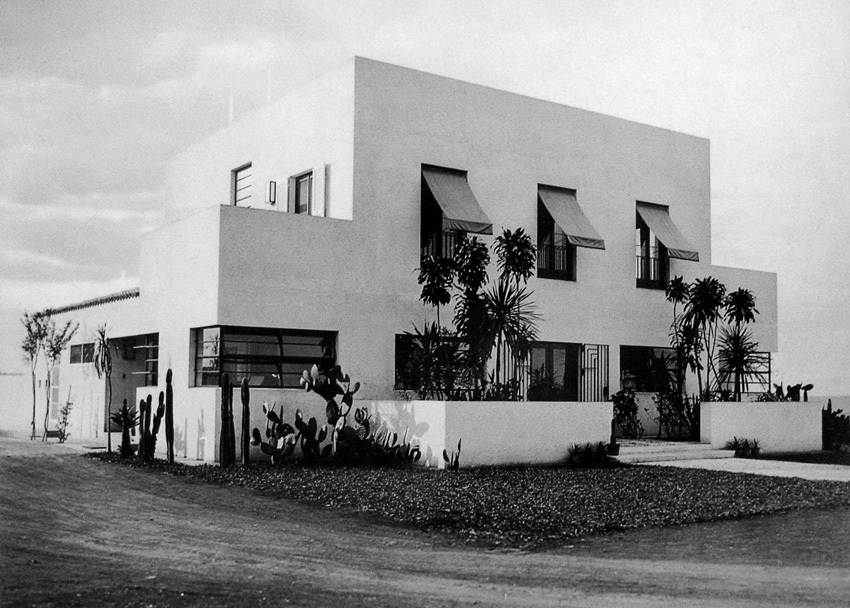
Casa da Rua Santa Cruz, the home designed by Gregori Warchavchik and landscaped by Mina Klabin.

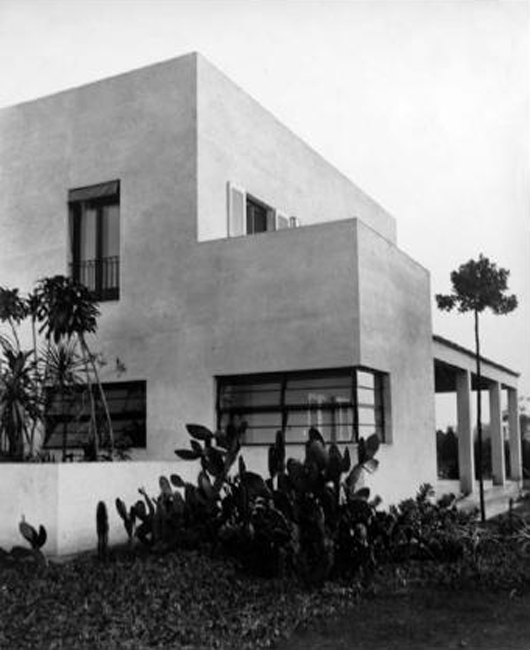
A cactus garden designed by Mina Klabin at Casa da Rua Santa Cruz.

At an early age, Mina Klabin displayed talents for learning languages, music and painting.

== Landscape design ==
Klabin is credited with celebrating native tropical species such as agaves, mandacarus and cacti. She created landscapes alongside the eight São Paulo homes designed by her husband, which include Casa Modernista, Rua Itápolis, São Paulo and their own home Casa da Rua Santa Cruz. The Casa Modernista is considered the first modern building in Brazil. She has been credited with helping to establish the cactus as an icon of modern Brazilian design. Her work with tropical plants has been described as the beginning of the Brazilian Tropical Garden movement. Klabin's use of cactus was several year before Juan O'Gorman did in the design for Diego Rivera and Frida Kahlo.

=== Other achievements ===
Mina Klabin Warchavchik and Gregori Warchavchik were among the early supporters of the São Paulo municipal theater.
