= Casa das Rosas =

Museum in São Paulo, Brazil

Casa das Rosas — Espaço Haroldo de Campos de Poesia e Literatura
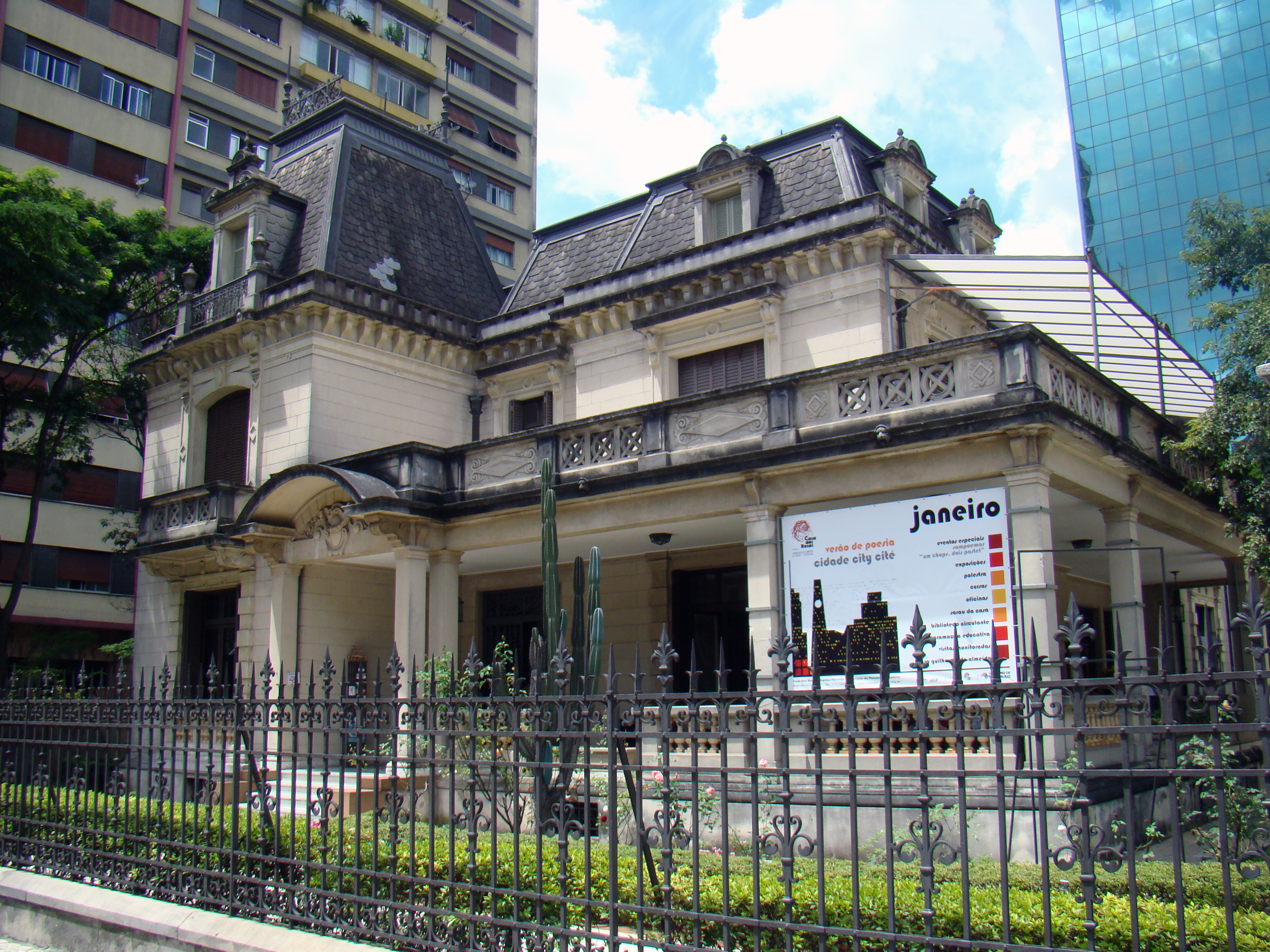
- Established: 1935
- Location: Avenida Paulista, 37; São Paulo, Brazil
- Coordinates: 23°34′16″S 46°38′44″W
- Public transit access: Brigadeiro
- Website: www.casadasrosas.org.br

Casa das Rosas — Espaço Haroldo de Campos de Poesia e Literatura, is a museum and cultural center in the Paraíso neighborhood of São Paulo, Brazil.

== History ==
Designed and built by Francisco de Paula Ramos de Azevedo, the classic French style mansion was the Ramos de Azevedo family home until 1985. The building was designed in 1930, and construction was completed in 1935.

On 22 October 1985 the Casa das Rosas was listed by Condephaat as a landmark. After a renovation, the Casa das Rosas was reopened on 19 September 1995.

In 2004 Casa das Rosas changed its name to include Espaço Haroldo de Campos de Poesia e Literatura (English: Haroldo de Campos Poetry and Literature Space). The Casa das Rosas has a legal mandate to:

- promote and disseminate poetry and literature in general,
- preserve the Haroldo de Campos Collection (donated by his family),
- preserve the building itself.

Operated by the Secretary of Culture of the state of São Paulo, approximately 80,000 visitors a year participate in courses, workshops, exhibitions, and presentations of various kinds at the Casa das Rosas.

== See also ==
- Centro Cultural e de Estudos Superiores Aúthos Pagano
- Memória do Bixiga Museum
