= Bixiga =

- São Paulo neighborhood
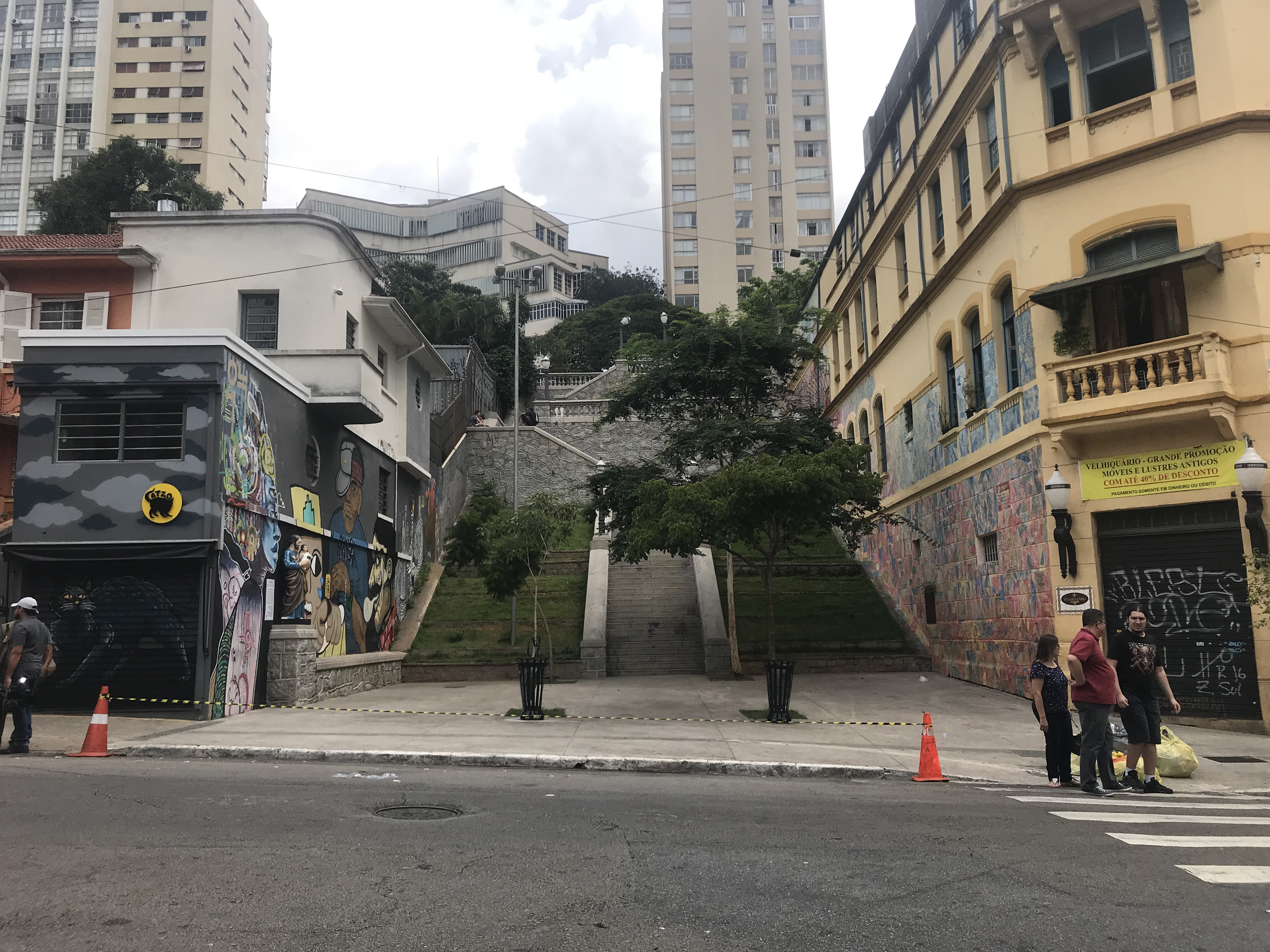

- Location within São Paulo Location within Brazil
- Coordinates: 23°33′24″S 46°38′41″W
- Country: Brazil
- Region: Southeast
- State: São Paulo
- Municipality: São Paulo
- Administrative Zone: Central
- Subprefecture: Subprefecture of Sé
- Website: se.prefeitura.sp.gov.br

Bixiga is a neighbourhood in the center of the city of São Paulo, Brazil. It is located within the district of Bela Vista. Bixiga is known for having been a hub for Italian immigrants.

== History ==
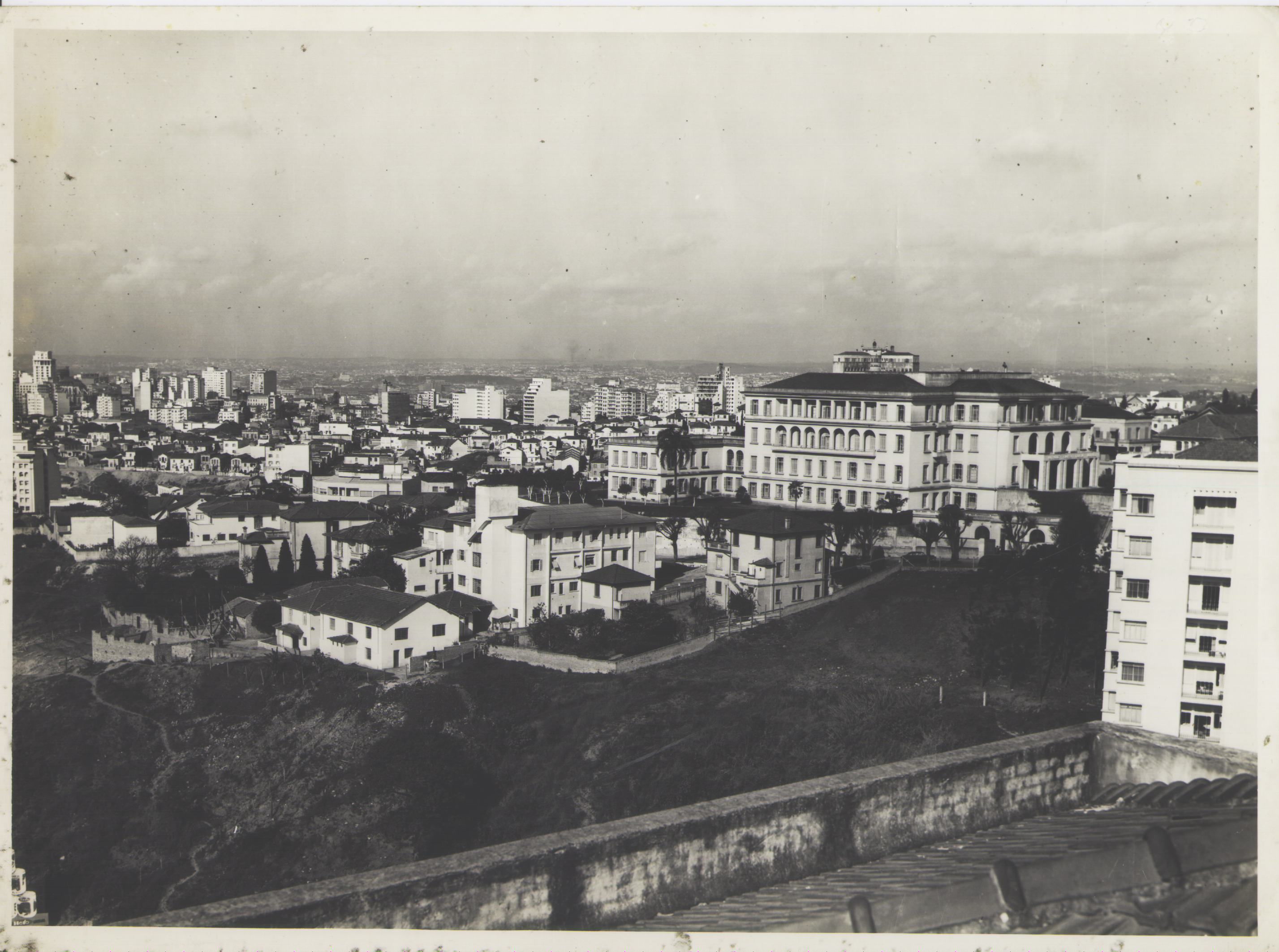
Old panoramic picture of Bela Vista, where Bixiga is located (date unknown)

The origins of the neighborhood can be traced to the foundation of the city. Nowadays, Bixiga is considered part of the official district of Bela Vista, but appeared on city maps with the Bixiga designation until 1943. It was incorporated into Bela Vista with the passing of Law 1242, in 1910. The area between the historic core, Paulista Avenue, 23 de Maio Avenue and 9 de Julho Avenue became, in 1878, the Chácara do Bexiga (Bexiga Farmstead), owned by Antônio José Leite Braga.

In the middle of the 18th century, São Paulo saw an expansion of its population beneath the original boundaries of the city center. With the beginning of industrialization in the mid-19th century, São Paulo experienced accelerated population growth, in large part due to immigration to the city caused by the new jobs in the industrial sector. The many farmsteads that surrounded the city center found new purpose soon enough, becoming residential lots primarily for working-class immigrants.

Purchasing the land from Thomaz Cruz in 1878, Leite Braga divided the farmstead into lots, which were then sold, thus beginning the urbanization process of Bixiga.

The birth of the neighborhood began at Largo dos Piques, a convergence point where many roads met and from which they began, thus making the locale popular for inns and hostels, as well as prostitution and weekly slave auctions. The streets of Santo Amaro and Santo Antonio connected São Paulo to neighboring cities, such as Jundiaí and the port city of Santos. The Largo dos Piques is currently known as Praça das Bandeiras or Largo do Riachuelo. Largo dos Piques is identified as Bexiga's foundation site by the Department of Historical Heritage of the city of São Paulo. Some of the slaves who escaped the auctions formed the short-lived maroon state Quilombo do Saracura.

In 1885 Rua Formosa was founded, thus connecting Bexiga to the Santa Ifigênia neighborhood to facilitate trade. The proximity of Anhangabaú, Largo dos Piques and Largo do Bexiga was instrumental to the development of the neighborhood.

The first streets in Bexiga were Santo Antonio, Major Quedinho, 13 de Maio, and Abolição. Urbanization of the area began in 1880, and saw a surge of Italian residents in the late 19th-century, particularly those from Sicily, Calabria, and Apulia. With an extensive supply of land at low costs, immigrants settled in the neighborhood into terraced houses and sobrados, which were usually mixed-use. Houses were low and usually built without a blueprint. In addition to Italian immigrants, many freed slaves settled in Bexiga. They mostly lived in the lower floors of houses due to cheaper rent.

By the 1920s Bexiga was the most densely populated neighborhood in São Paulo. Tenements and basement residences began to appear at this time, damaging the neighborhood's reputation. The presence of both a black and immigrant populations made Bexiga a culturally diverse area, becoming known for such events as the Samba School Vai-Vai and the Our Lady of Achiropita Festival.

== Gallery ==
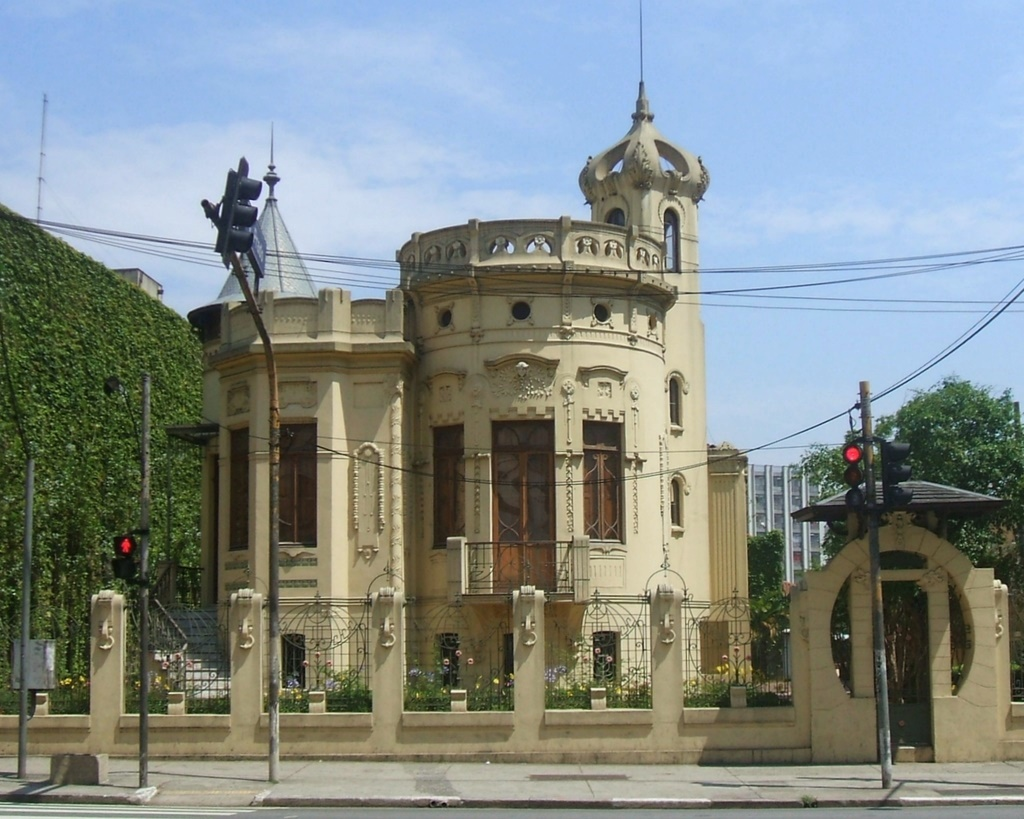
Brigadeiro Luís Antônio Palace

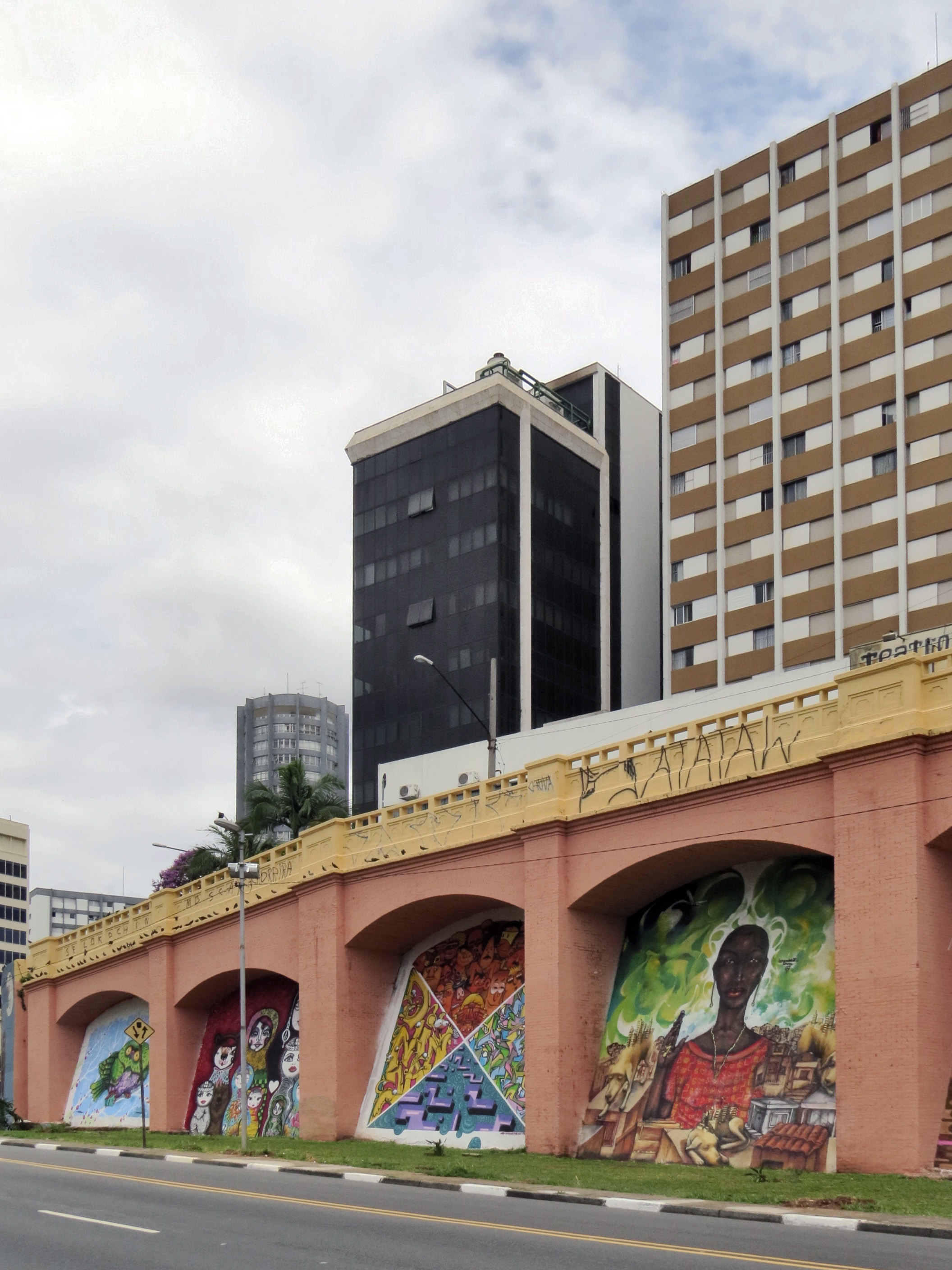
The "Arcos do Bixiga" in 2015

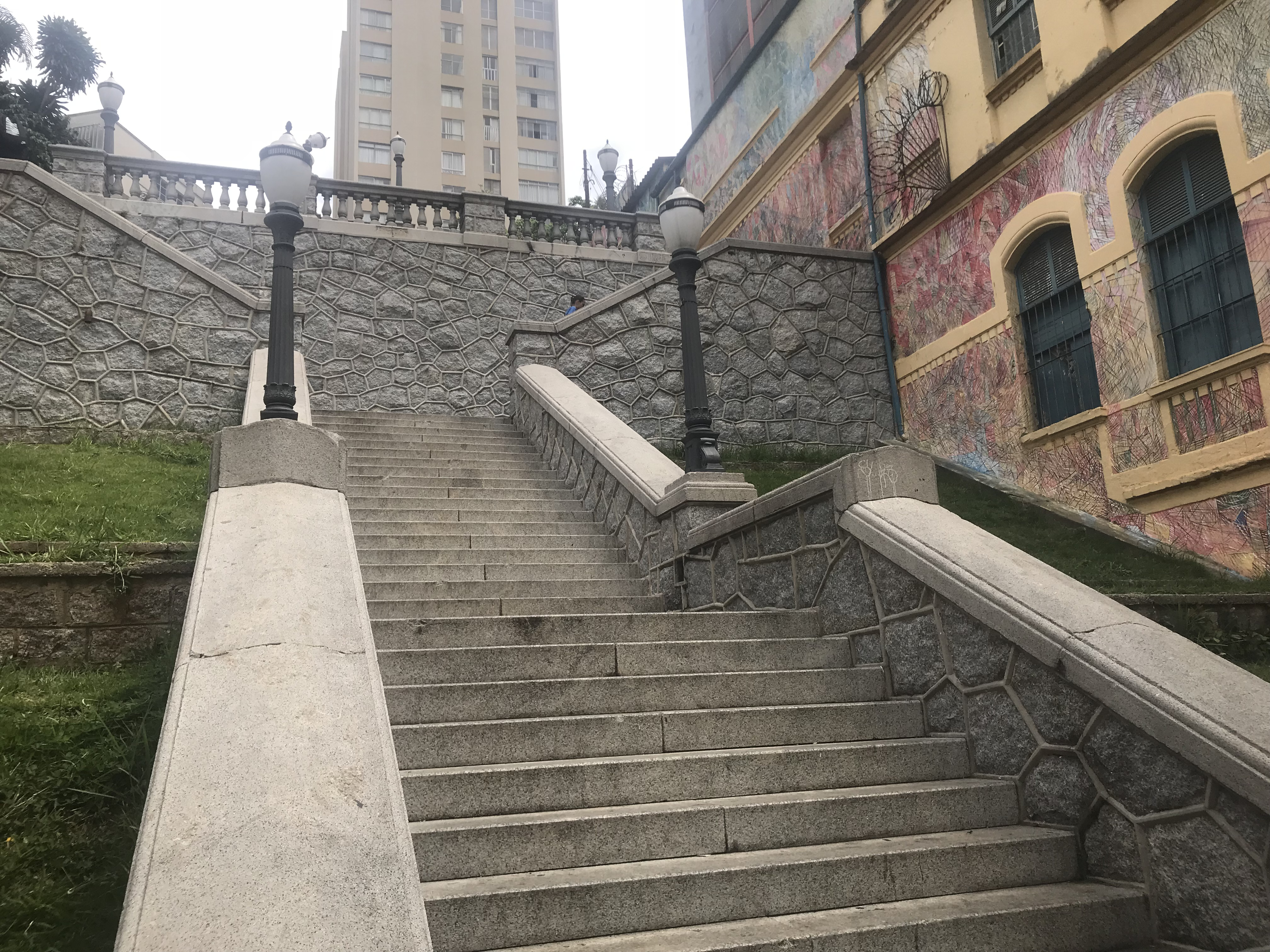
The Bixiga staircase, in front on Dom Orione Square

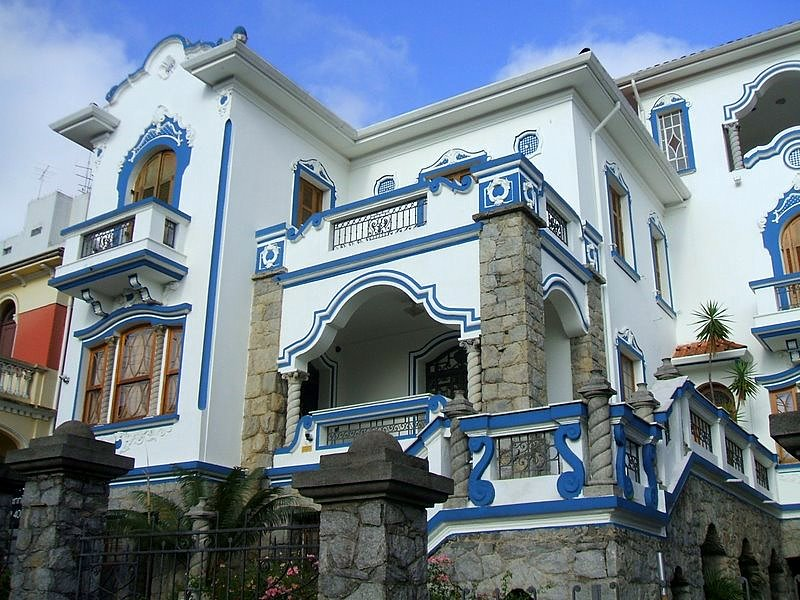
The Museu dos Óculos (Glasses Museum) in 2009

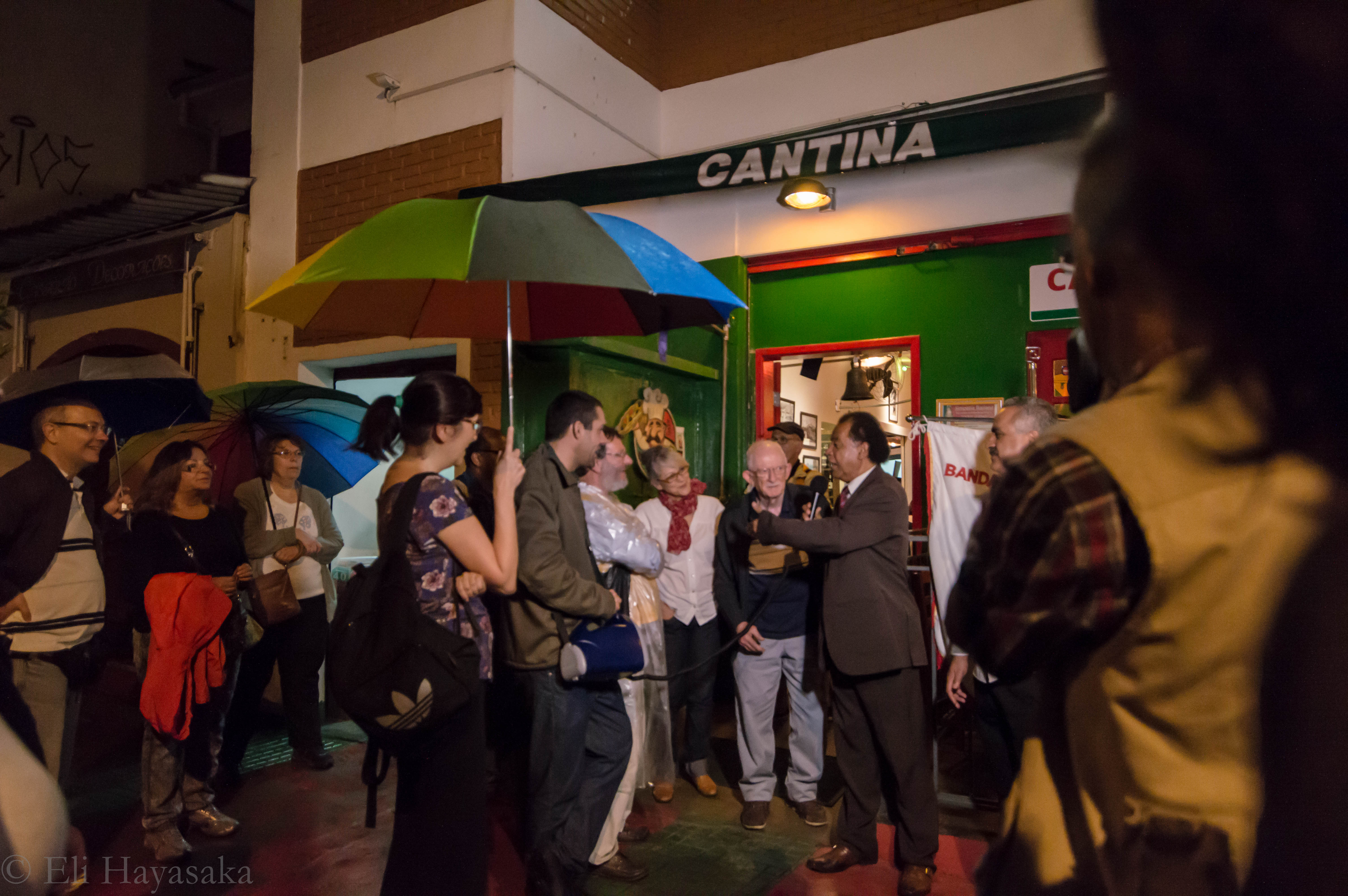
Bixiga

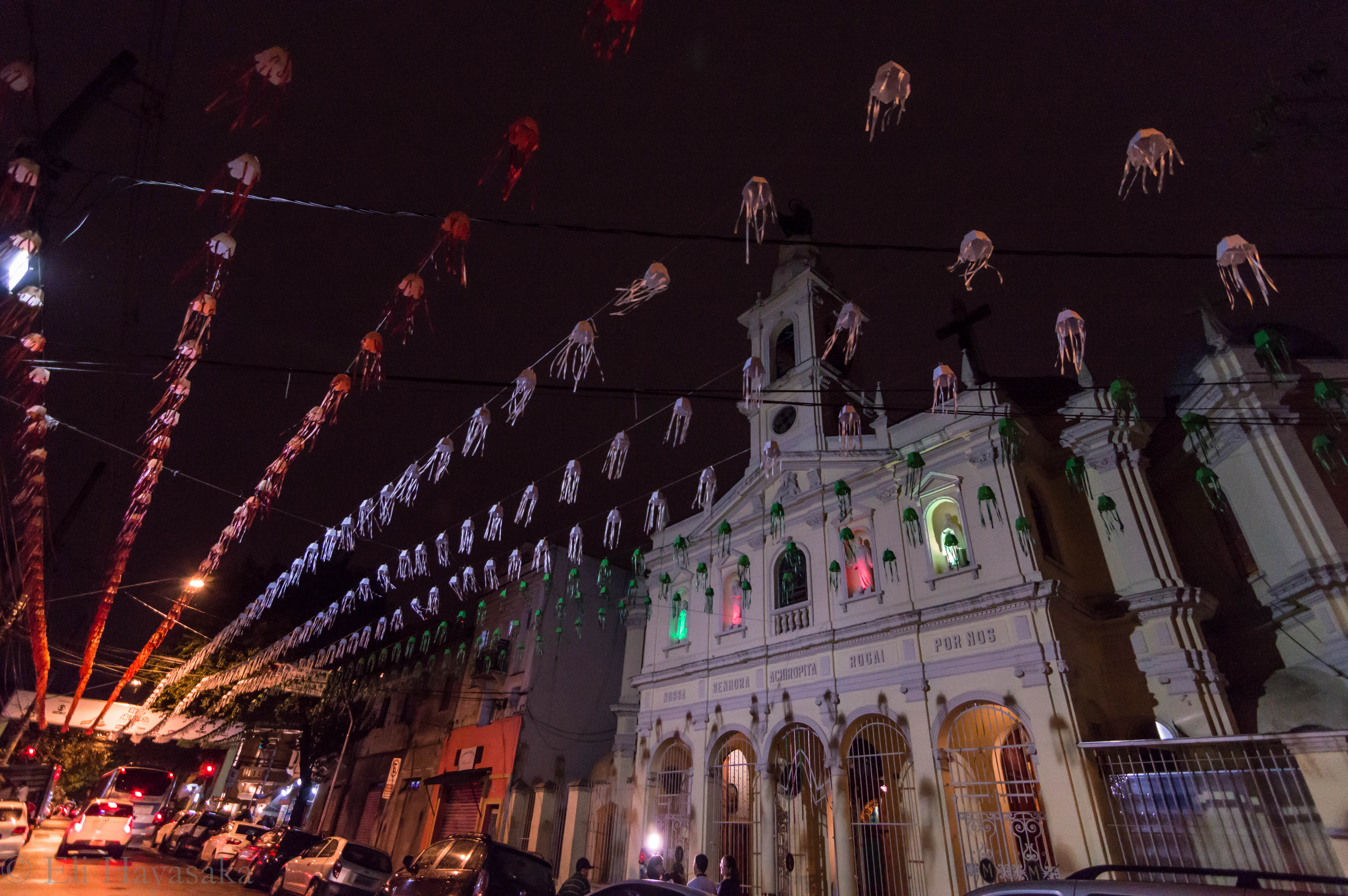
Streets of Bixiga

== See also ==
- Vai-Vai
- Roman Catholic Archdiocese of São Paulo
- Memória do Bixiga Museum

== Sources ==
- Scripillitti, Ana Carolina Nader (23 March 2017). "Verticalização e tombamento no bairro do Bexiga: materialização em tensão" (in Portuguese). São Paulo: Mackenzie Presbyterian University.
- Sampaio de Castro, Márcio (2008). Bexiga: um bairro afro-italiano (in Portuguese). Annablume. ISBN 978-8574198620.
