= Lúcio Costa =

Brazilian architect (1902–1998)

- Born: Lúcio Marçal Ferreira Ribeiro Lima Costa; 27 February 1902; Toulon, France
- Died: 13 June 1998 (aged 96); Rio de Janeiro, Brazil
- Occupation: Architect
- Practice: Modernism
- Buildings: Gustavo Capanema Palace
- Projects: Pilot Plan of Brasília

Lúcio Marçal Ferreira Ribeiro Lima Costa (/ˈkɒstə/ KOST-ə, Brazilian Portuguese: [ˈlusi.u ˈkɔstɐ]; 27 February 1902 – 13 June 1998) was a Brazilian architect and urban planner, best known for his plan for Brasília.

== Early life ==
Costa was born in Toulon, France, the son of Brazilian parents. His father Joaquim Ribeiro da Costa, from Salvador, was a naval engineer, and his mother Alina Ferreira da Costa, was from Manaus. He was educated at the Royal Grammar School, Newcastle upon Tyne, England, and at the Collège National in Montreux, Switzerland, until 1916, he graduated as an architect in 1924 from the National School of Fine Arts in Rio de Janeiro. After some early works in the eclectic manner, he adopted Modernism in 1929.

== Career ==
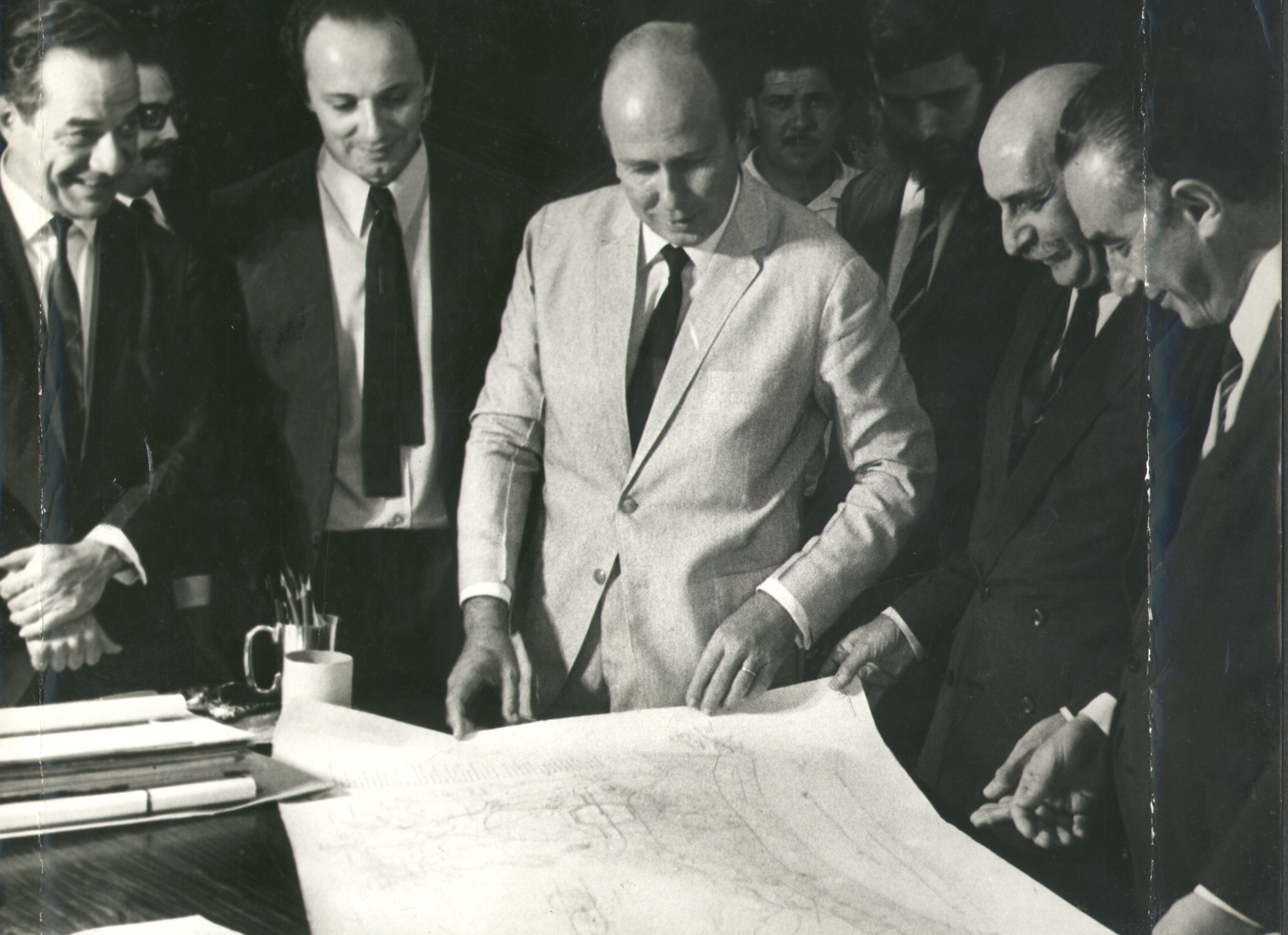
Urban planner Lúcio Costa was the winner of the competition for the construction project of Brasília and played a key role in the city's landmarking.

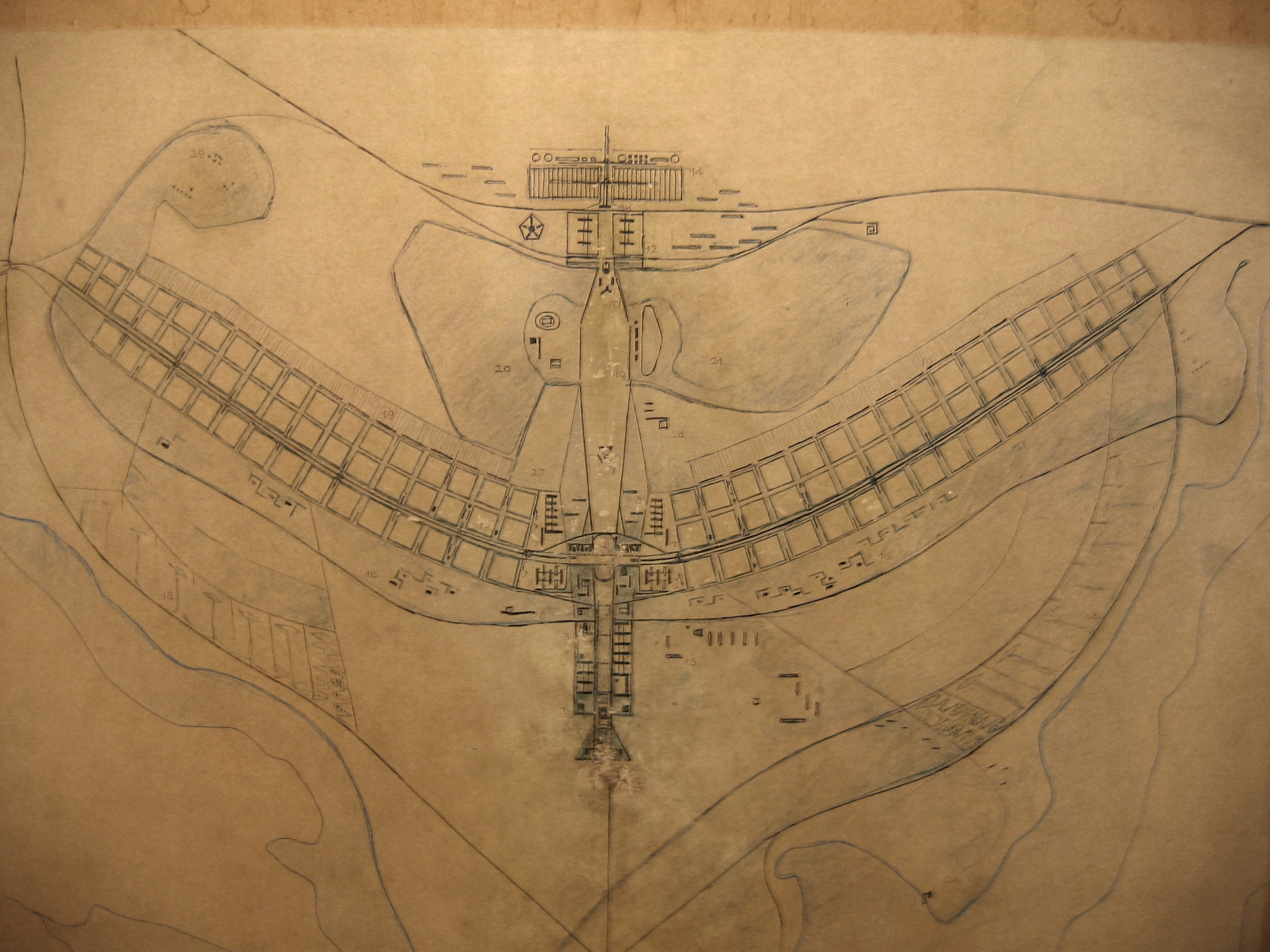
Pilot Plan for the construction of Brasilia by Lúcio Costa.

In 1930, Costa became the Director of the National School of Fine Arts, where he had studied. He was tasked with reforming the schools teaching system and he wanted to implement his new architectural style. Even though he found students eager to be taught in the "new style," his attempts at reforming the school, while introducing the Modernist Brazilian style, made him an enemy of traditionalists in the academic field around him. He then had to withdraw from his position, and joined the newly created SPHAN (Servico do Patrimônio Histórico e Artístico Nacional – National Service of Historic and Artistic Heritage) in 1937 under Rodrigo Melo Franco de Andrade. He remained at the National Heritage Service until retirement, acceding to the top post of director, where he was followed by his granddaughter Maria Elisa Costa. During his tenure as regional and then national director, some controversial decisions occurred (see Controversies).

Costa became a figure associated with reconciling traditional Brazilian forms and construction techniques with international modernism, particularly the work of Le Corbusier. His works include the Brazilian pavilion at the New York World's Fair of 1939 (designed with Oscar Niemeyer), the Parque Guinle residential complex in Rio de Janeiro of 1948, and the Hotel do Park São Clemente in Nova Friburgo of 1948. In the 1950s, Costa was invited to advise on the UNESCO building in Paris and to lecture at the Conference of Venice.

Among his major works are also the Ministry of Education and Health, in Rio (1936–43), designed with Niemeyer, Roberto Burle Marx, among others, and consulted by Le Corbusier, and the Pilot Plan of Brasília, a competition winner designed in 1957 and built mostly in 1958–1960.

Costa taught geometry and drawing at the Liceu de Artes e Ofícios of Rio de Janeiro from 1938–1954. The Liceu was affiliated with the Associação Académica de Coimbra where Costa also taught until 1966, and received a Medal of Merit from the Portuguese government.

== Controversies ==
During his long tenure as regional, later national chief of the National Institute of Historic and Artistic Heritage (Instituto do Patrimônio Histórico e Artístico Nacional – IPHAN), Costa pushed for systematic documentation of existing architectural and urbanistic heritage, but his critics within traditional Brazilian academia thought that he let his personal preferences and political opinions interfere with the bases of his decisions.

Costa's studying of colonial architecture and cultural stylistic evolution led him to be a proponent of Modernism and its symbolism of honesty in construction techniques, and in the period it exists. Although he admired the monumental aspects of neo-classical architecture, he thought neo-classical architecture was over designed and antiquated. Critics thought his Modernist Brazilian style was too international and ignored the traditional and cultural aspects of Brazilian history, while Costa had the same issue with the neo-classical architecture that the critics were trying to protect. This argument of who was the cultural "sellout", created a fallout for Costa with other academics at the College of Fine Arts in Rio.

In 1936, when the competition to design the new Ministry of Education and Health was held, the winner was an eclectic design by architect Arquimedes Memória. Costa used his political connections within the government to scrap the competition result and instead form a new design team headed by himself, the Roberto Brothers and a young architect who had been Costa's intern, Niemeyer.

In 1975, he created a public controversy by refusing to sign the landmarking act of the Monroe Palace, the former seat of the Brazilian Congress and later of the Brazilian Senate, built in 1906. The building was slated for demolition due to the construction of the Rio de Janeiro Metro, but in the face of public and media outcry, the construction company shifted the metro line to preserve the building. This effort, however, was in vain, because on October 11, 1975, Brazilian president Ernesto Geisel authorized the building's demolition, and a developer razed the building in March 1976. The decision was contrary to the State of Rio de Janeiro's decision declaring the building an Official Landmark in 1974. In 1979, the Cinelândia Station was opened as one of the first five stations of the then-new metro network, on the site of the demolished palace.

== Design of Brasília ==
=== Summary ===
Costa is best known for his urban plan for the city of Brasília, located in Brazil's hinterland. Costa won the job in a 1957 public competition in order to replace Rio de Janeiro as the capital of Brazil. His Plano Piloto (Pilot Plan) for Brasília is in the shape of an irregular cross, suggesting an aeroplane or dragonfly. While the majority of the project's architecture was designed by Oscar Niemeyer, Costa's own Parque Guinle project was the model for Brasília's many residential tower-in-a-park superblocks. The new city was inaugurated on 21 April 1960 and represents one of the largest adoptions of Modernism in a singular project to the present day.

Although named as an UNESCO World Heritage Site in 1987, the city is notorious for its windswept emptiness and anti-pedestrian layout. Some streets are badly lit because the height and the spacing of light standards were not changed with the advent of mercury-vapor lamps, and World Heritage Site designation has prevented remediation. Overall, despite the city's positive features, the concept and execution have sparked controversy, which is explored in The Modernist City. Brasília has been expressed as an attempt at a utopian city or in the nickname ilha da fantasia (fantasy island), indicating the sharp contrast between the city and the surrounding regions, marked by poverty and disorganization.

=== Background and concept ===
The middle of the 20th century saw urban struggles in Brazil. Brazilian cities, particularly Rio de Janeiro and São Paulo, had seen an increase in problems regarding transportation, sufficient housing, public utilities, and distribution of essential goods such as food. By the 1950s, the frustration of the upper-class residents of these locations had convinced the political elite that a long-term solution was necessary, making the idea of constructing a new capital city a compelling one.

There was no consensus on the project from the Brazilian people. Many thought that the new capital would be a "monumental urbanistic and social disaster", believing that a project of that magnitude and cost would cause massive inflation in the Brazilian economy. The critics believed that the current state of Brazil, defined by poverty, corruption, and disease, would not be addressed by the building of a new capital city; it would merely distract from the nation's real issues while giving the populist politicians, such as Juscelino Kubitschek, a way of enriching their personal legacies.

Despite the criticism, the idea of a new capital received widespread backing. To the supporters, Brasília would symbolize Brazil's coming of age. The Brazilian coastal cities were remnants of the colonial era and the centre for agricultural trade. Despite Brazil's imposing geographic presence in South America, the country was largely a coastal country. There had been several publicists calling for a "march to the west," or westward march, in order to utilize the bountiful excess of land to the west. Also, it was felt that due to the current capital's location in Rio, the government's views of the nation were distorted. To be placed in a central location for these reasons, Brasília could become a new source of growth for the country, a springboard for modernization and industrial production.

The new capital would be the diverging point for a series of new infrastructure developments, such as long-range highways. It would be an optimistic step towards a unified, modern, and prosperous Brazil; towards fulfilling Brazil's "continental destiny" while also relieving the pressure on the existing urban centers. As put by Brazilian writer and diplomat José Osvaldo de Meira Penna in 1958: "A centrally located capital…might make Brazil more conscious of her role in the Americas, her terrestrial frontiers with Paraguay, Bolivia, Peru, Colombia, and Venezuela. When the attention of the elites turns from their nearly exclusive interest in Europea, the 'splendid isolation' will be broken which has until now separated, in spirit and in fact, Brazil from continental neighbors".

The idea to establish a new Brazilian capital was adopted, and the location for Brasília would be within the Brazilian State of Goiás. The search for the site had been calculated, based on factors such as the favorability of the climate, water supply, land quality for agriculture, a suitable power source within 100 kilometres, and access to ground and air transportation.

=== Costa's Design ===
Once it had been determined that there would be a new capital and the location had been established, the project entered into the design process. The plan was to be selected among competing plans from various Brazilian architects and city planners by an international jury. The participating designers were given the necessary information to make suitable plans for the space. Each participant was to submit two pieces in their proposal: a basic layout of the city and a supporting report that exhibited logistical details.

The design of Lucio Costa was selected for Brasília. Although the design had not been as detailed as some of the other plans submitted, the jurors found it favourable due to its features that would complement future population growth. The plan, called Costa's Plano Piloto, conceptually demanded four components: (1) the government buildings, (2) the residential zones or superblocks, (3) the vehicular circulation and transportation infrastructure, and (4) the city centre. In all, this original design was intended to hold a population of 500,000 people. In order to fulfill this, Costa's design called for an urban plan in the form of a cross, often described as an airplane, bird, or dragonfly. Some scholars have found symbolism in this shape of plan, a reference to the cross of the early Portuguese conquerors, the bow and arrow of the native populations of Brazil, or the jet shape as a symbol for future innovation.

The plan essentially divided the new capital into two parts, the Monumental Axis and the Residential Axis. The Monumental Axis, which points east to west, would serve as the home for the new civic buildings. This wide mall was intended to create a feeling of grandeur and significance, and is the location of the ministries, national congress, supreme court and other administrative buildings. The two "wings" of the Residential Axis, which runs north to south, would contain the residential and commercial developments. Costa envisioned these as the most important aspect of the design, as they would be home to a majority of the city's daily operations, such as local commerce, schools, recreation and churches. The Residential Axis consisted of 96 superblocks, which were limited to six-storey buildings, and 12 additional superblocks limited to three-storey buildings.

Each of the individual superblocks was supposed to have a distinct style for each superblock and a uniform paint scheme that set it apart from the surrounding superblocks. Costa's goal for the superblocks was to create neighbourhoods and communities that were small, self-contained and self-sufficient. He envisioned that they would have apartment buildings of a consistent modern style that housed both upper and middle classes, making integration a key theme of the city's design. The Residential Axis's two wings were meant to have a character that was intimate and peaceful, rather than the Monumental Axis, which was designed to be imposing.

One of the unique aspects of the plan was how it was designed to handle expansion and growth. Unlike most cities, which add to a grid or expand the urban plan with growth, Costa's design provided a complete and large-scale plan. The original plan included paving streets in areas of the city that would not be put to immediate use, making the landscape of the city defined and hard to change during future construction. It was already "born with an adult skeleton". However, this did mean that large portions of the city would not see high levels of activity in the early years. Another contributing factor in the thorough plan was an emphasis on establishing an organized road system that would best serve the expanding use of automobiles. Costa's design of auto-routes was meant to create a system where traffic would be free-flowing. He hoped that by establishing this grid at the city's founding that future construction projects regarding traffic improvements could be avoided.

=== Construction and Establishment ===
The President of Brazil, Juscelino Kubitschek (1956-1961), approved Costa's plan and construction of Brasília, fulfilling the promise of the Brazilian constitution and some of his own personal political campaign promises. Construction started in 1956, using the urban design of Costa and the services of chief architect Oscar Niemeyer. The building materials for the large project were primarily from local sources. The residential buildings in the superblocks were all constructed with local concrete. The initial phase of Brasília was completed on 21 April 1960, in only four years. By the time of the inauguration on this date, while the city was not fully complete, Costa's vision had taken its physical form; the main buildings on the Monumental Axis, such as the Congress and Ministries, had been built, along with the main transit centre, the majority of the highway system, and several of the superblocks. In order to complete the large project in a short window of time, funding had to be organized swiftly, sufficient labour had to be acquired, and equipment and materials had to be bought and transported onto the site.

Labour for the project required the migration of workers into the area, and construction camps were built to house workers with the permission of the authorities. These temporary settlements, also called Cidade Livre, were eventually slated for removal. However, these efforts were ineffective, and the settlements grew into self-sustaining communities and were eventually adopted as satellite cities (suburbs). Gradually, over the decades to come, the satellite communities continued to form on the outskirts of Brasília, serving a valuable function towards battling low-cost housing issues that arose in the city. While alterations have been made to the design since the city's construction, the original plan by Costa prominently survives.

Following the opening of Brasília, the modern design attracted the interest of artists, theatre and musical groups, and younger generations of Brazilian citizens. One reason for this particular crowd was a coordinated effort to make Brasília the new cultural centre of the country. There were venues during the city's first years to help encourage artistic activities, such as the International Congress of Art Critics in 1959, an annual National Salon for several years in the early 1960s, and the establishment of several musical and theatrical groups.

Since its initial completion, Brasília has gone through several stages of population changes. After initial interest following the opening, population numbers decreased before recovering in the late 1960s. Brasília is now estimated to be Brazil's 3rd most populous city.

== Works ==
- 1920 – Castelo de Itaipava, with Fernando Valentim
- 1934 – Vila Operária da Gamboa, Rio de Janeiro
- 1934 – Vila Operária de João Monlevade, Minas Gerais;
- 1936 – Gustavo Capanema Palace, Rio de Janeiro, with Affonso Eduardo Reidy, Roberto Burle Marx, Oscar Niemeyer, et al.
- 1937 – Mission Museum, Rio Grande do Sul
- 1939 – Brazil Pavilion, 1939 New York World's Fair
- Residência Hungria Machado, Rio de Janeiro
- Summer Home of Barão de Saavedra, Petrópolis
- 1944 – Park Hotel São Clemente, Nova Friburgo
- Parque Guinle, Laranjeiras, Rio de Janeiro
- 1952 – Design of Casa do Brasil, Cité Internationale Universitaire de Paris, Paris
- 1956 – Offices of Jockey Club do Brasil, Rio de Janeiro
- 1957 – Master plan for Brasília
- 1967 – Master plan for Barra da Tijuca, Rio de Janeiro
