= Memória do Bixiga Museum =

Museum in São Paulo, Brazil

- Museu Memória do Bixiga
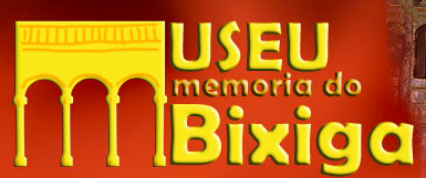

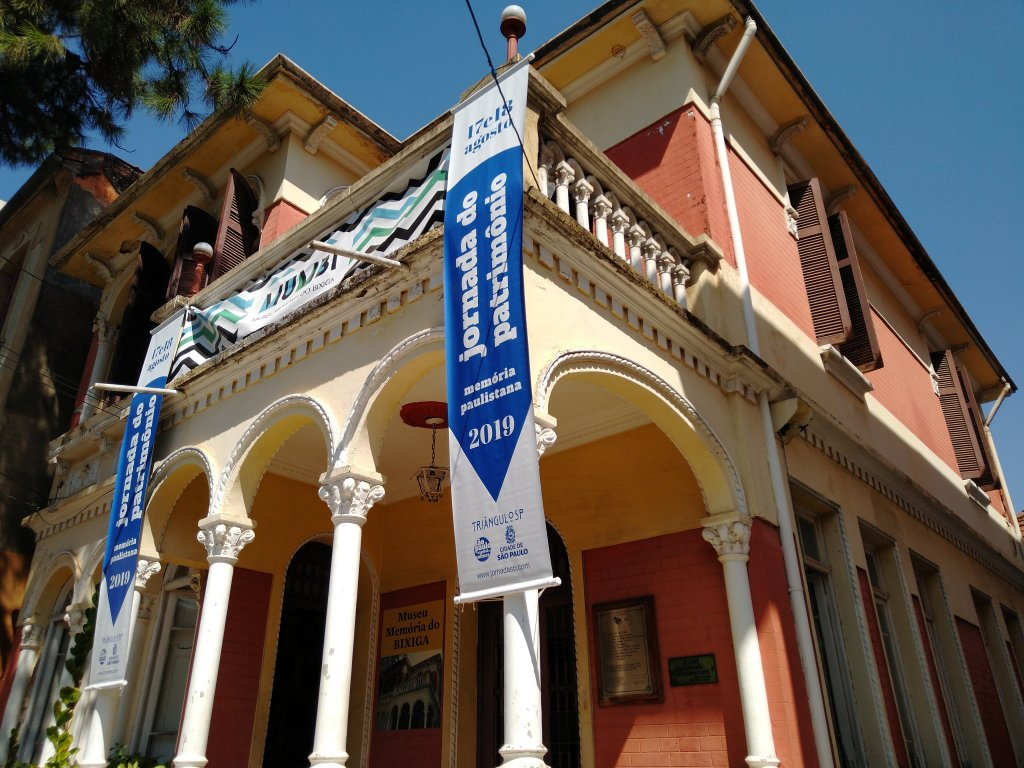

- Location within Brazil
- Established: 1981
- Location: São Paulo, Brazil
- Coordinates: 23°33′32.44″S 46°38′50.28″W
- Type: Museum
- Website: http://www.museumemoriadobixiga.com

The Memória do Bixiga Museum is located in São Paulo, Brazil, and tells the story of the region's Italian immigrants. Founded in 1981 it is one of the city's oldest museums and is located in a typical 20th-century building at 118 Rua dos Ingleses. It was closed from 2005 to 2010, but later reopened to the public.

== History ==
Opened in 1981 the Memória do Bixiga Museum was designed by the neighborhood's cultural agitator, Armando Puglisi, commonly known as Armandinho do Bixiga, and features objects related to Italian immigrants in the region. Most of the items on display were donated by Puglisi or by residents of the neighborhood.

== Collection ==
The museum's collection includes 1,500 different items, as well as 8,000 photographs including objects by Adoniran Barbosa. Among the items on display, many of them donated by the creator of the place himself, there are pasta machines and bottles in which milk was delivered door-to-door at the time. The collection also includes classic uniforms from the Vai-Vai samba school, Carmen Miranda's shoes, weapons from the 1932 Revolution, a dentist's chair from the 1920s and photos of Bixiga.

The building is larger than its first location. On the first floor, visitors can see a refrigerator that is over 100 years old, a pair of gloves belonging to "Piranha" (Pedro Galasso), a veteran boxer who also lived in the neighborhood, and letters from the Second World War.

Although little is known about the building that houses the Memória do Bixiga Museum, it was built at the beginning of the 20th century and is listed by Conpresp. Due to administrative problems, it was closed from 2005 to 2010, but reopened on 18 March 2010.
