= The Modernist City =

The Modernist City: An Anthropological Critique of Brasilia
- Author: James Holston
- Language: English
- Subject: New towns, city planning, Brasilia, urban anthropology, architecture,
- Published: 1989
- Publisher: The University of Chicago Press
- Publication place: United States
- ISBN: 978-0226349794

The Modernist City: An Anthropological Critique of Brasilia is a book by anthropologist James Holston published by the University of Chicago Press in 1989.

The book is a case study of the Brazilian capital, Brasilia, as a way to understand the use of modernist principles as the basis for designing a city. The title is a reference to the principles of modernism underlying the development of the city. In the book, Holston traces the development and implementation of the plan for Brasilia, and the development of the city from its inception.

The book is 369 pages long and contains 106 photographs, graphs, and diagrams.

== Synopsis ==
Holston has a broad goal in the writing of the book, which he lays out near the beginning. He proposes "a critical ethnography of modernism" as a way for evaluating the flaws with each. He applies this concept to establish a "counter discourse" to show that the use of a master plan in effect caused the plan's own failure. These large-scale concepts frame his work.

The book contains three parts which are each divided into multiple subsections. These parts are 1): The Myth of the Concrete, 2): The City Defamiliarized, and 3): The Recovery of History.

In "The Myth of the Concrete," Holston establishes the context of Brasília's development, saying "Brasília was built to be more that merely the symbol of this new age. Rather, its design and construction were intended as means to create it by transforming Brazilian society." Building from this basis premise, he argues that the city was unable to live up to its lofty founding goals once it was inhabited because human interaction with its theoretical basis created a paradox that made it impossible to implement the initial plan. In this section, Holston draws upon the Plano Piloto, or the pilot plan for Brasília, statements by the President, Juscelino Kubitschek, as well as influential works of modernism to make his point. He then traces the development of Brasília to the tenets of Congres Internationaux d'Architecture Moderne (CIAM), arguing that Brasília is a case study for the execution of those principles. Then, he traces how the creator of the plan, Lucio Costa, designed the plan as a way that it would be interpreted as a myth, arguing that this presentation led to its early appeal.

In "The City Defamiliarized," Holston argues that an area where the city broke with tradition the most clearly was in the death of the street. He shows how the plan was designed "to transform, both architecturally and socially, an urban way of life established in preindustrial cities." He then analyzes street plans of more traditional European and Brazilian cities to show how the plan of Brasilia aimed to reorder the idea of the city. This concept is linked to zoning, which Holston uses to further show how Brasilia sought to reorder the traditional notion of the city by clearly breaking the city into specific zones that clearly separated different functions.

In "The Recovery of History," Holston directly address the paradox that arose when the presentation of Brasília as lacking a history clashed with the reality of constructing it. He argues that "to be different, an imagined utopia must negate the prevailing order that generates a desire for it and to be autonomous it must remain dehistoricized. Yet, in doing so, it becomes powerless to achieve autonomy since whatever substance it might have comes from that very order." He traces how the establishment of Brasilia was meant to mirror the founding of Brazil and the realization of a new Brazil. However, he shows how neither the Portuguese or the Kubitschek administration took account of those there before, the indigenous peoples or the construction workers (pioneers). This failure to account for the construction worker was one key area where the Utopian vision of the city was undercut, as Holston shows through the multiple rebellions of the workers forcing their relocation to sanctioned satellite cities in the Federal District. He shows these workers' use of national symbols, arguing that this effort was key to securing satellite cities and access to Brasilia. Finally, he shows how traditional Brazilian city development and culture have crept into the city from day one, undercutting its purpose as a unique and ahistorical creation.

== Critical reception ==
The Modernist City: An Anthropological Critique of Brasilia has been largely positively received. Writing about the book, Michael Storper states "there is finally a book about modernism and the city that clarifies rather than obscures, that combines theoretical depth and methodological rigor with prose almost free of heavy academic jargon, and that is almost as fun to read as a novel." The approachability of Holston's analysis is noted throughout critical responses to the book, and his strength of argument is noted as well. Reviewers point out his effective analysis of the concepts of utopianism and its relationship between modernism and reality. Another common theme in reviews of the book is praise of how Holston approaches modernism, with reviewers highlighting his simple explanations of modernism as a design principle and modernism as a way of life. Holston's interdisciplinary approach is also praised both for its breadth in coverage and in what it communicates to the reader, with reviewers saying "It is also liberally sprinkled with insights gleaned from the author's architectural, planning and anthropological reading." However, this interdisciplinary approach can make it difficult for readers to clearly define the discipline and simultaneously understand his method as stated by Mia Fuller.

The book has received some criticism, with Alan Gilbert arguing that "the sections on social and residential segregation are insufficiently based on hard data to satisfy most social scientists." However, Gilbert does not see this issue as undermining his credibility. Another one of Gilbert critiques is that the multiple disciplines used in the work leads to some "reinventing [of] the wheel," making the work repetitive in light of other more specific works in the appropriate subdisciplines.
