= Setor de Indústria e Abastecimento =

- Administrative region
- Região Administrativa do Setor de Indústria e Abastecimento; Administrative Region of Setor de Indústria e Abastecimento
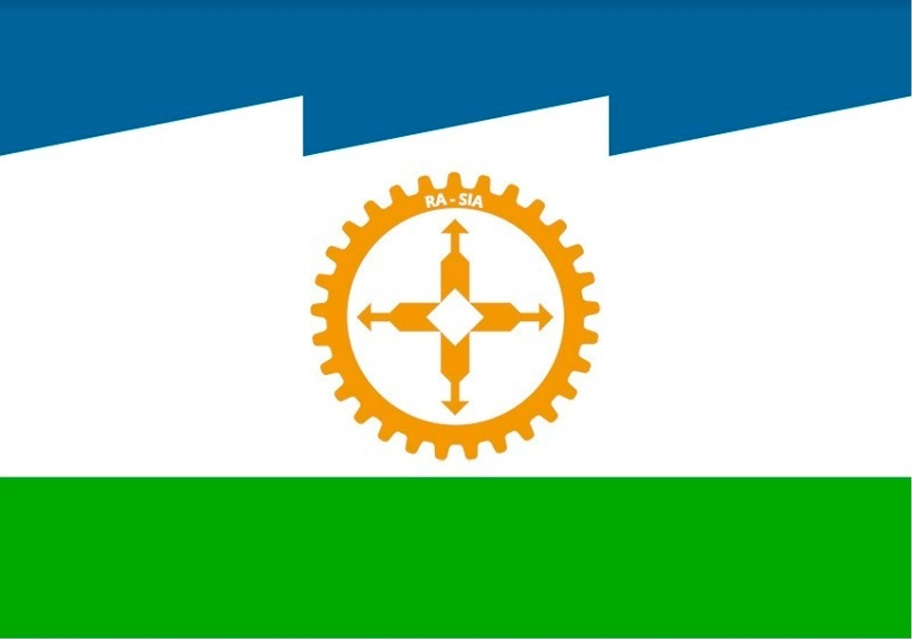
- Flag

- Location of SIA in the Federal District

- Location of Setor de Indústria e Abastecimento in Brazil
- Coordinates: 15°48′14″S 47°57′36″W
- Country: Brazil
- Region: Central-West
- State: Federal District
- Founded: April 21, 1969

Government
  - Regional administrator: Antônio Donizete Andrade

Population (2010)
  - Total: 2,585
- Time zone: UTC-3 (BRT)
  - Summer (DST): UTC-2 (BRST)
- Postal Code (CEP): 71800-000
- Area code: +55 61
- Website: www.sia.df.gov.br

Setor de Indústria e Abastecimento (Note: English: Sector of Industry and Supply) is an administrative region in the Federal District in Brazil. It is bordered by Brasília to the north and northeast, Cruzeiro and Sudoeste/Octogonal to the east, Guará and Vicente Pires to the south, and SCIA to the west. Setor de Indústria e Abastecimento is, alongside SCIA, an industrial hub in the Federal District, being host to various industries such as construction, logistics, and commerce. Setor de Indústria e Abastecimento was founded on April 21, 1969, receiving the status of administrative region, according to Law 3618, of July 14, 2005.

== Geography ==
Setor de Indústria e Abastecimento is located in the Brazilian Highlands, in the Central-West region of Brazil. It is located west of Brasília.

== Infrastructure ==
=== Transport ===
The region is served by the DF-095 highway, which connects it to Ceilândia, Taguatinga, Águas Claras, Vicente Pires, Samambaia, and Águas Lindas de Goiás.

== See also ==
- List of administrative regions of the Federal District
