= Setor Complementar de Indústria e Abastecimento =

- Administrative region
- Região Administrativa do Setor Complementar de Indústria e Abastecimento; Administrative Region of Setor Complementar de Indústria e Abastecimento
- Location of SCIA in the Federal District

- Location of Setor Complementar de Indústria e Abastecimento in Brazil
- Coordinates: 15°47′15″S 47°58′43″W
- Country: Brazil
- Region: Central-West
- State: Federal District
- Founded: October 25, 1989; 36 years ago

Government
  - Regional administrator: Alceu Prestes de Mattos

Population (2010)
  - Total: 25,732
- Time zone: UTC-3 (BRT)
  - Summer (DST): UTC-2 (BRST)
- Postal Code (CEP): 71800-000
- Area code: +55 61
- Website: www.scia.df.gov.br

Setor Complementar de Indústria e Abastecimento (Note: English: Complementary Sector of Industry and Supply) is an administrative region in the Federal District in Brazil. It is bordered by Brasília to the north, SIA to the east and south, and Vicente Pires to the west. Setor Complementar de Indústria e Abastecimento was founded on October 25, 1989, receiving the status of administrative region, according to Law 3315, of January 27, 2004. Its current administrator is Alceu Prestes de Mattos. As of 2010, it has a population of 25,732.

== Geography ==
Setor Complementar de Indústria e Abastecimento is located in the Brazilian Highlands, in the Central-West region of Brazil.

=== Climate ===
Setor Complementar de Indústria e Abastecimento has a Tropical Savanna climate (Köppen: Aw). The climate has two distinct seasons, the rainy season, from October to April, and the dry season, from May to September. During the dry season, the city can have very low relative humidity levels, often below 30%. The average temperature is 21.4 °C (70.5 °F).

== Government ==
The government of Setor Complementar de Indústria e Abastecimento is the Regional Administration. In a different fashion to municipalities, the Administrative Regions are administered by Regional Administrations, which are led by an administrator. Each administration is responsible for providing services to their respective regions, such as power, water, sanitation, and road infrastructure. The current administrator for Setor Complementar de Indústria e Abastecimento is Alceu Prestes de Mattos.

== Education ==
Setor Complementar de Indústria e Abastecimento is home to the Federal Institute of Brasília's Estrutural campus.

== Transportation ==
Setor Complementar de Indústria e Abastecimento is connected to Vicente Pires, Ceilândia, Águas Claras, and Samambaia via the DF-095 (Estrada Parque Ceilândia or Estrutural) highway.

== See also ==
- List of administrative regions of the Federal District
