= Guará, Federal District =

Guará
- Administrative region
- Região Administrativa de Guará; Administrative Region of Guará
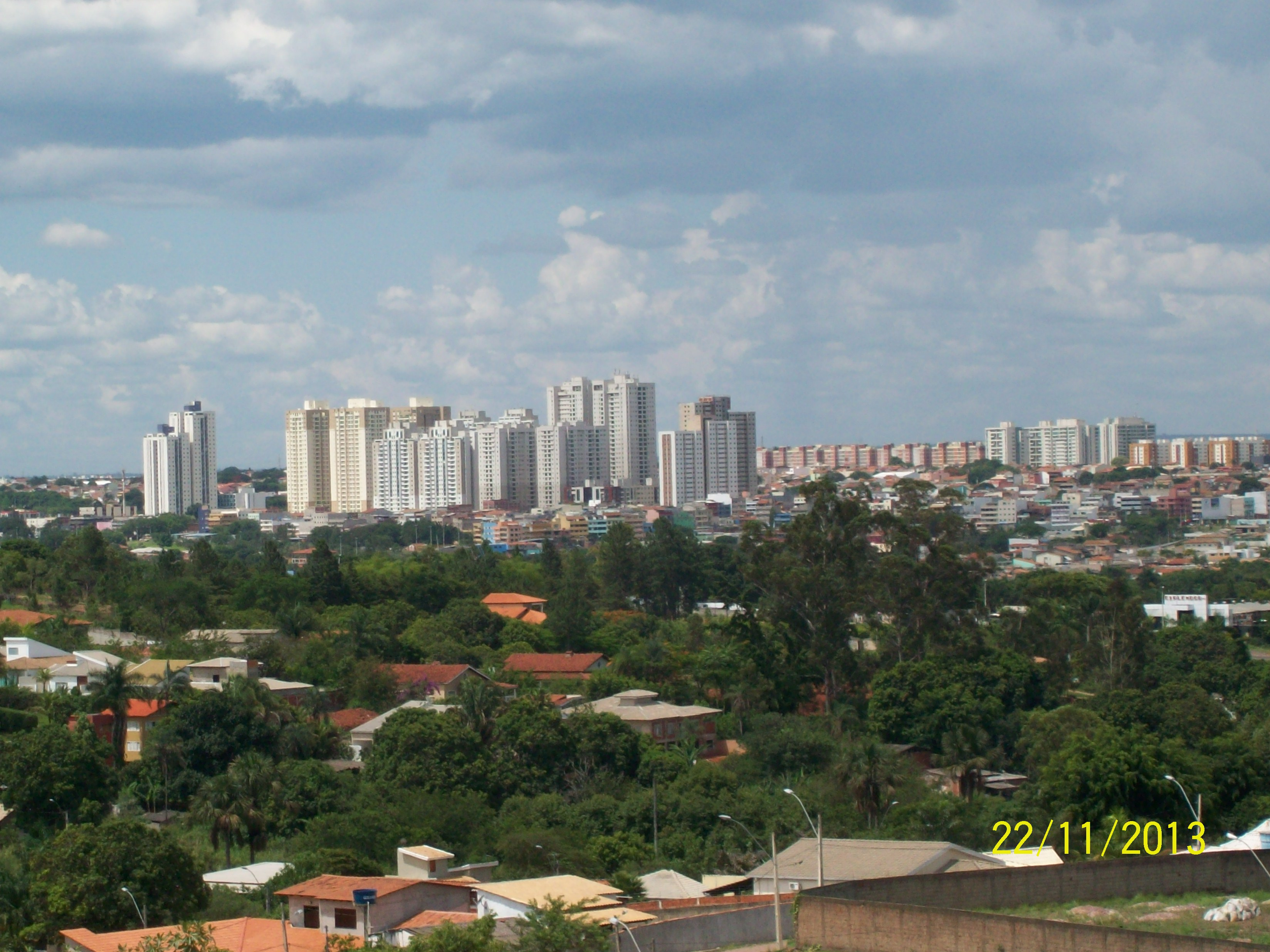
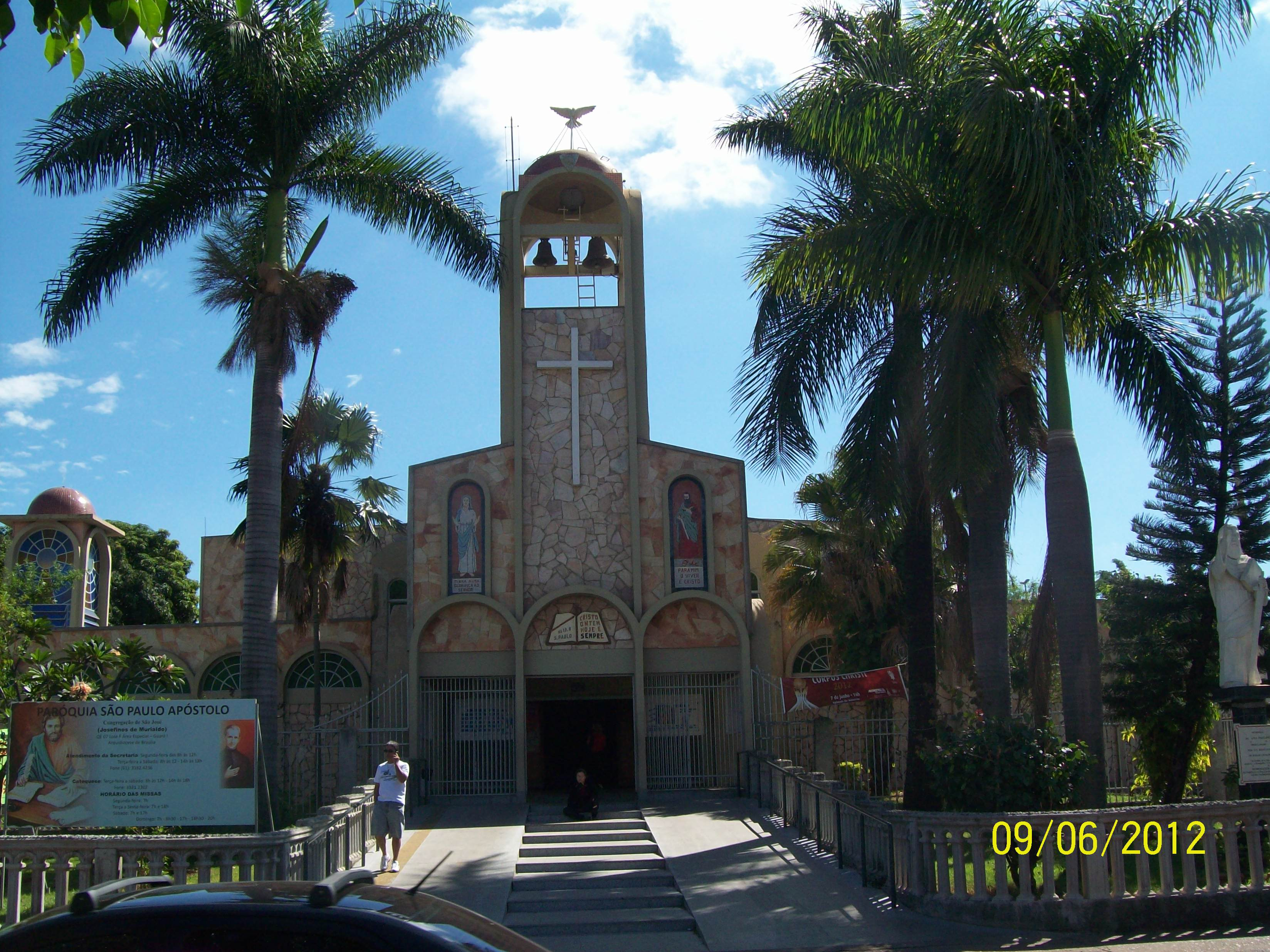
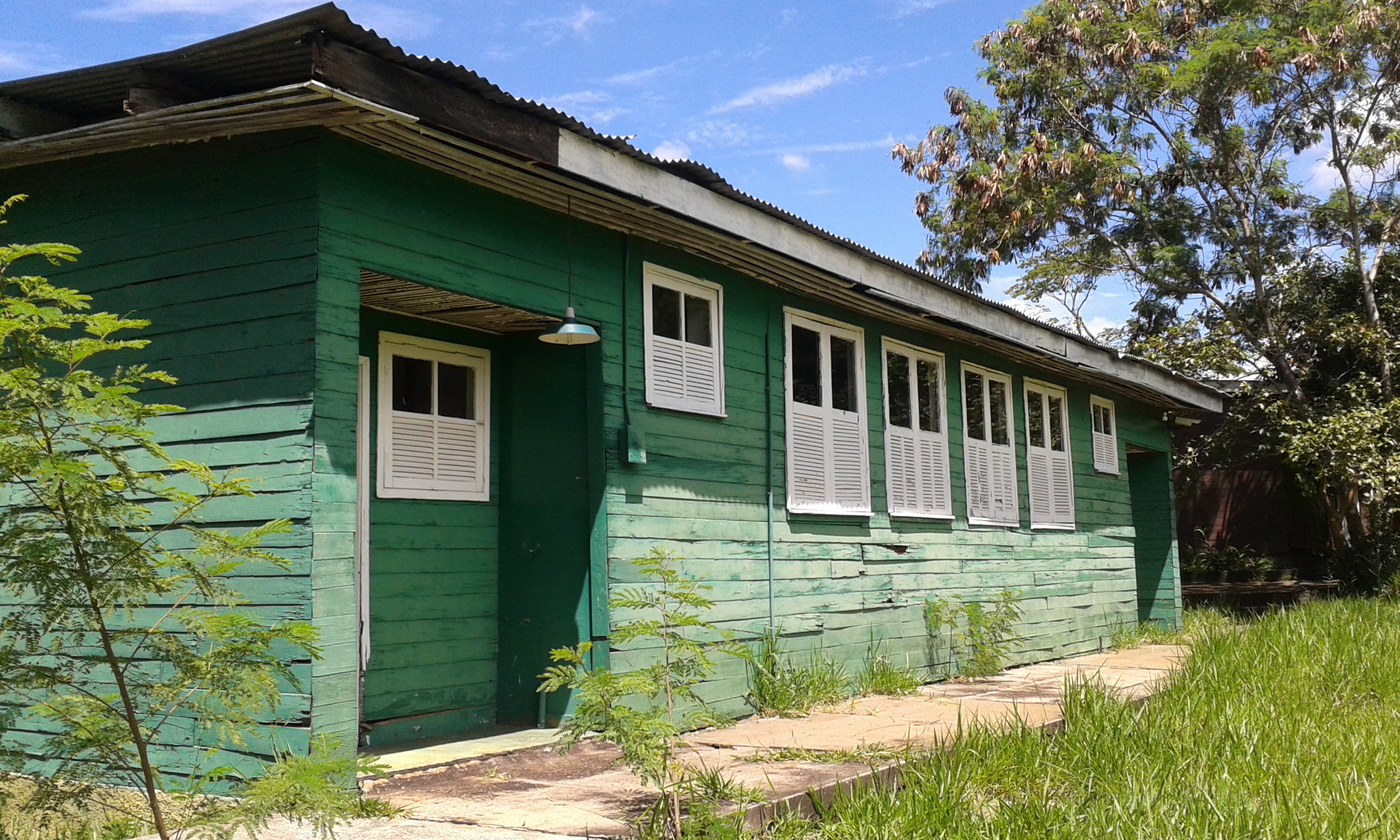
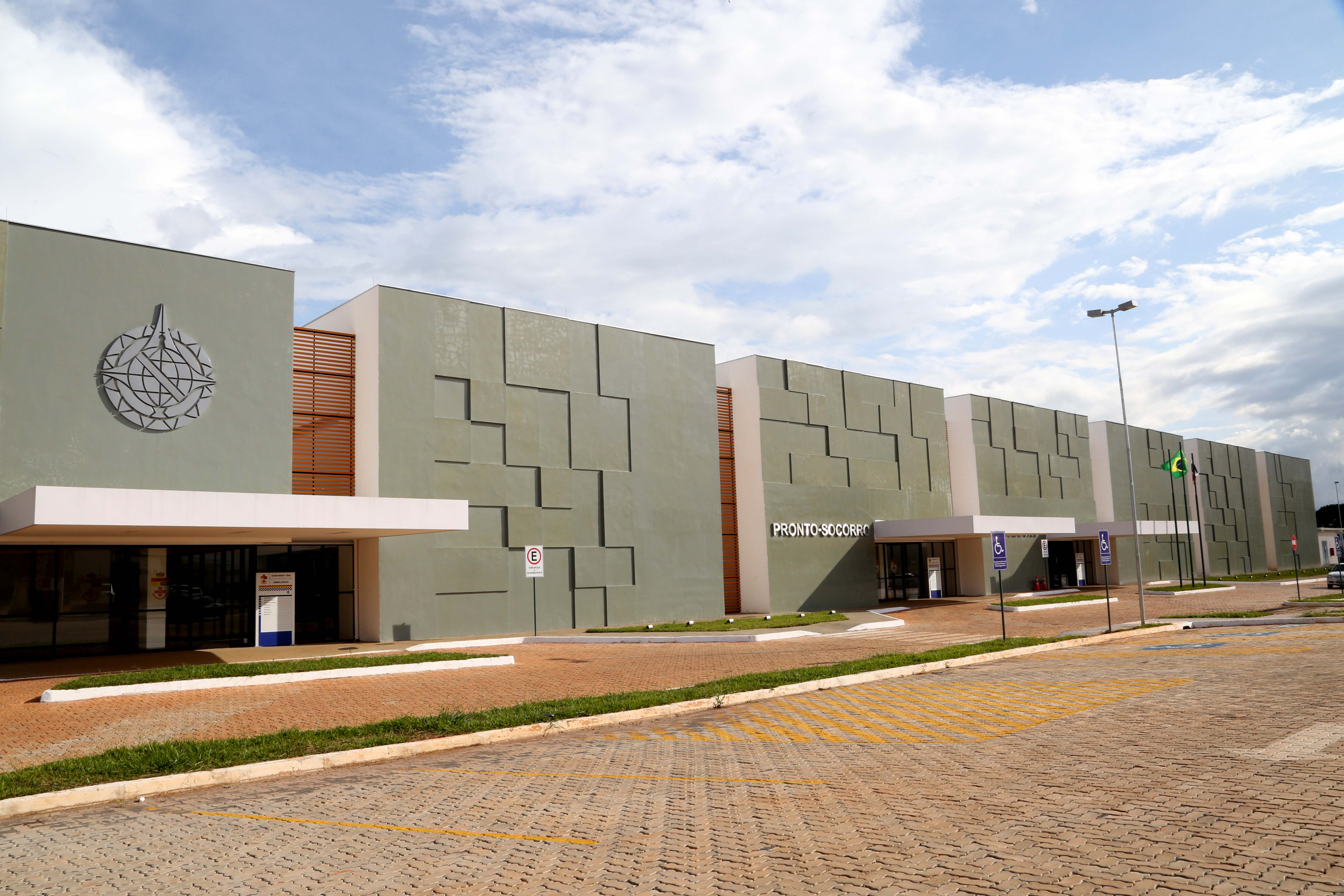
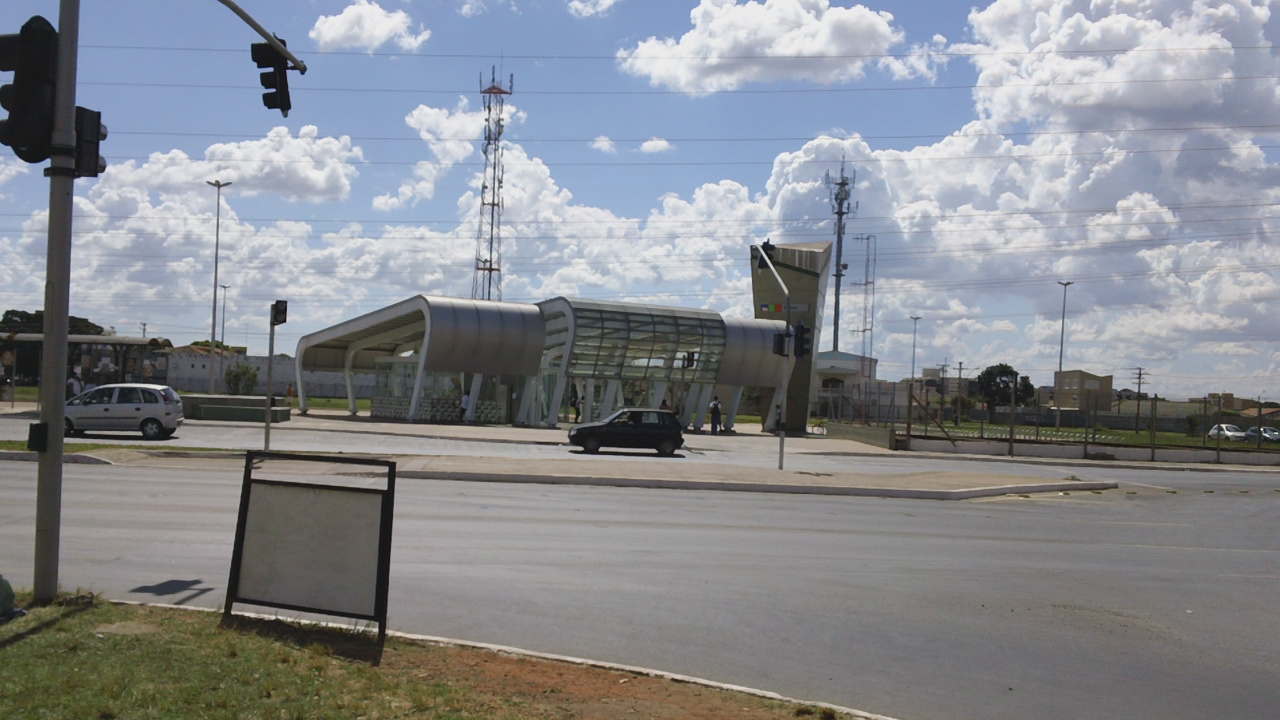
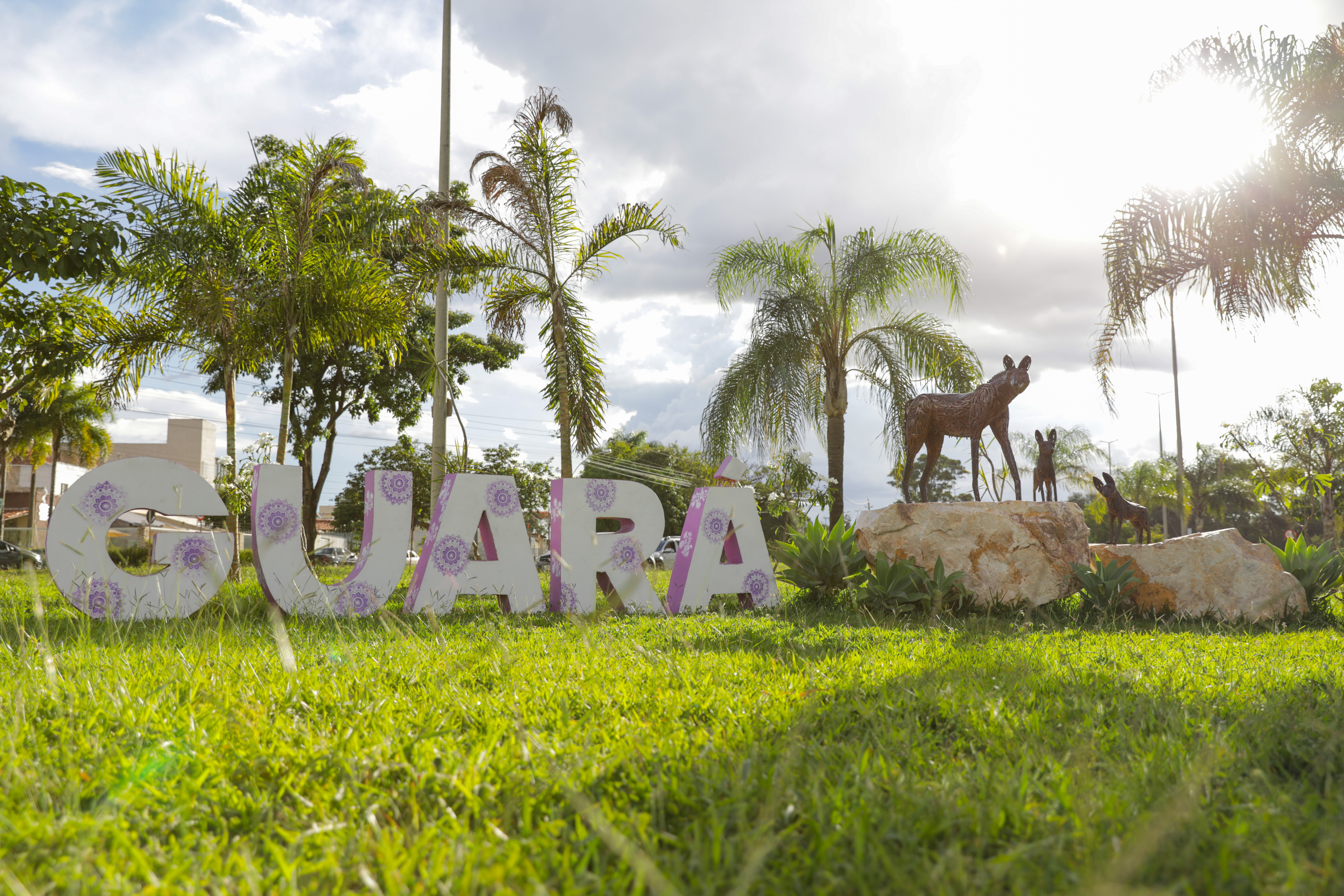
- Clockwise from top: Skyline; St. JK; Guará station; Guará sign; Centro Médico da Polícia Militar do Distrito Federal; São Paulo Apóstolo Church

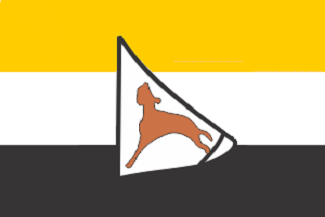
- Flag

- Location of Guará in the Federal District
- Coordinates: 15°49′32″S 47°58′48″W
- Country: Brazil
- Region: Central-West
- State: Federal District
- Established: May 5, 1969

Government
  - Regional administrator: Luciane Gomes Quintanal

Area
  - Total: 21 km^{2} (8.1 sq mi)

Population
  - Total: 125,703
  - Density: 6,000/km^{2} (16,000/sq mi)
- Time zone: UTC−3 (BRT)
- Area code: +55 61
- Website: www.guara.df.gov.br

Guará (Portuguese pronunciation: [ɡuaˈɾa]) is an administrative region in the Federal District in Brazil. It is bordered by SIA to the north, Sudoeste/Octogonal and Candangolândia to the west, Núcleo Bandeirante to the south, Park Way to the southeast, and Águas Claras to the east, and Vicente Pires to the northeast. Guará was founded on May 5, 1969, receiving the status of administrative region, according to Law 49, of October 25, 1989.

== Geography ==
Guará is located in the Brazilian Highlands, in the Central-West Region.

=== Climate ===
Guará has a Tropical Savanna climate (Köppen: Aw). The climate has two distinct seasons, the rainy season, from October to April, and the dry season, from May to September. During the dry season, the city can have very low relative humidity levels, often below 30%. The average temperature is 21.4 °C (70.5 °F).

== Government ==
Due to the Federal District's unique status, the government of Guará is a Regional Administration, due to the district's subdivisions being Administrative regions instead of municipalities. In a different fashion to municipalities, the Administrative Regions are administered by Regional Administrations, which are led by an administrator. Each administration is responsible for providing services to their respective regions, such as power, water, sanitation, and road infrastructure. The current administrator for Guará is Artur Nogueira.

== Transportation ==
Guará is home to the Federal District Metro's Guará station, as well as the Feira and Shopping.

== Sport ==
Guará is home to a karting circuit, as well as a football stadium which has been closed since 2016. Both are part of the Guará Sports and Leisure Complex (Portuguese: Complexo Esportivo e de Lazer do Guará (CAVE)), which is expected to be refurbished.

=== Venues ===
- Estádio Antônio Otoni Filho
- CAVE Gymnasium

== See also ==
- List of administrative regions of the Federal District
