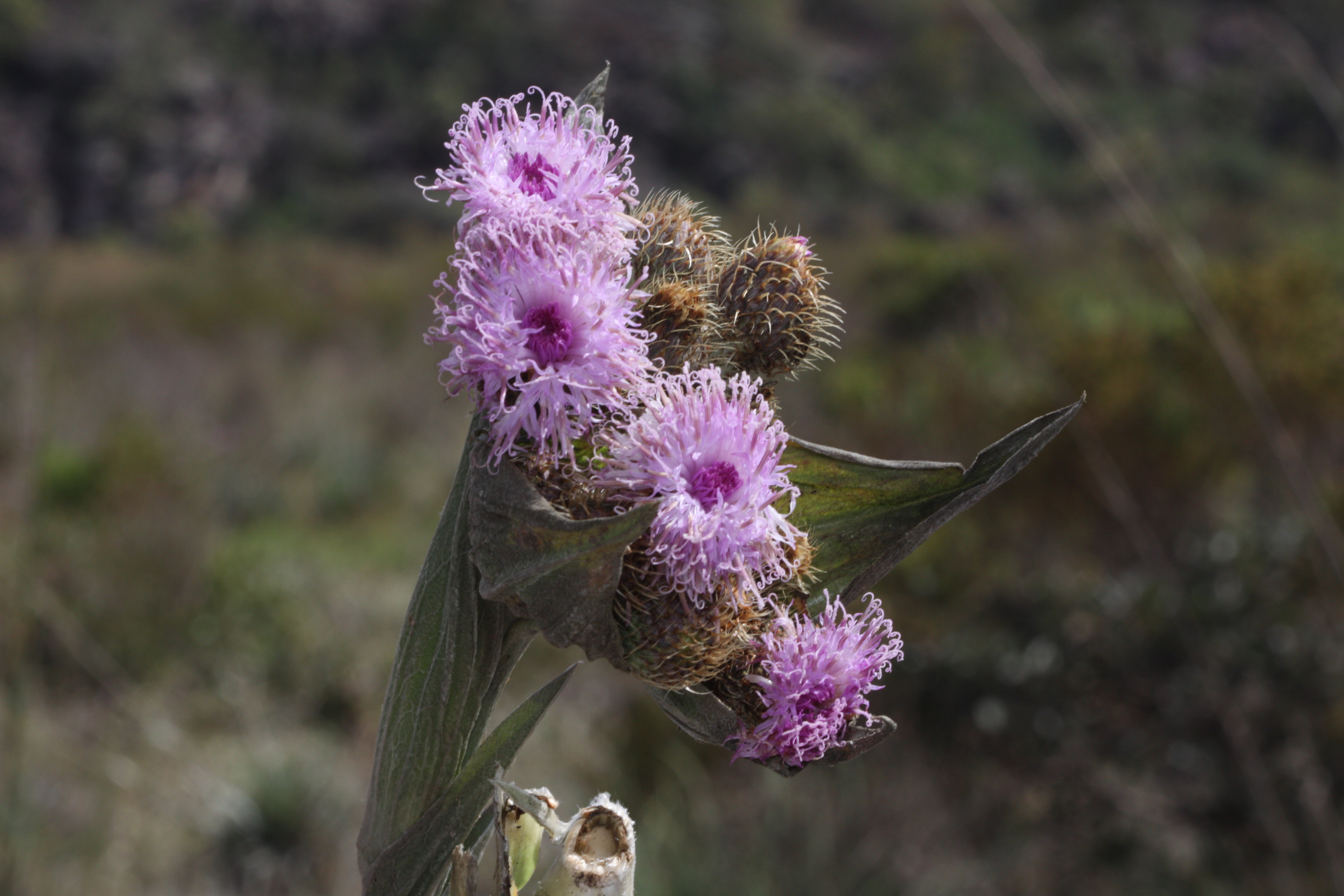

Scientific classification
- Kingdom: Plantae
- Clade: Tracheophytes
- Clade: Angiosperms
- Clade: Eudicots
- Clade: Asterids
- Order: Asterales
- Family: Asteraceae
- Subfamily: Cichorioideae
- Tribe: Vernonieae
- Genus: Proteopsis; Mart. & Zucc. ex Sch. Bip

Species
- Proteopsis argentea Mart. & Zucc. ex Sch.Bip.; Proteopsis hermogenesii Loeuille, Semir & Pirani

= Proteopsis =

Genus of plants

Proteopsis is a genus of flowering plants in the family Asteraceae. It is native to Brazil.

Species

- Proteopsis argentea Mart. & Zucc. ex Sch.Bip.
- Proteopsis hermogenesii Loeuille, Semir & Pirani

formerly included

see Heterocoma Hololepis Minasia Sipolisia

1. Proteopsis ekmaniana Philipson - Xerxes ekmanianum (Philipson) J.R.Grant
2. Proteopsis glauca Mart. ex Baker - Hololepis pedunculata (DC. ex Pers.) DC.
3. Proteopsis insculpta Philipson - Heterocoma albida (DC. ex Pers.) DC.
4. Proteopsis lanuginosa (Glaz. ex Oliv.) Philipson - Sipolisia lanuginosa Glaz. ex Oliv.
5. Proteopsis scapigera Mart. ex Baker - Minasia scapigera H.Rob.
6. Proteopsis sellowii Sch.Bip. - Heterocoma albida (DC. ex Pers.) DC.
