= Cruzeiro, Federal District =

Cruzeiro
- Administrative region
- Região Administrativa de Cruzeiro; Administrative Region of Cruzeiro
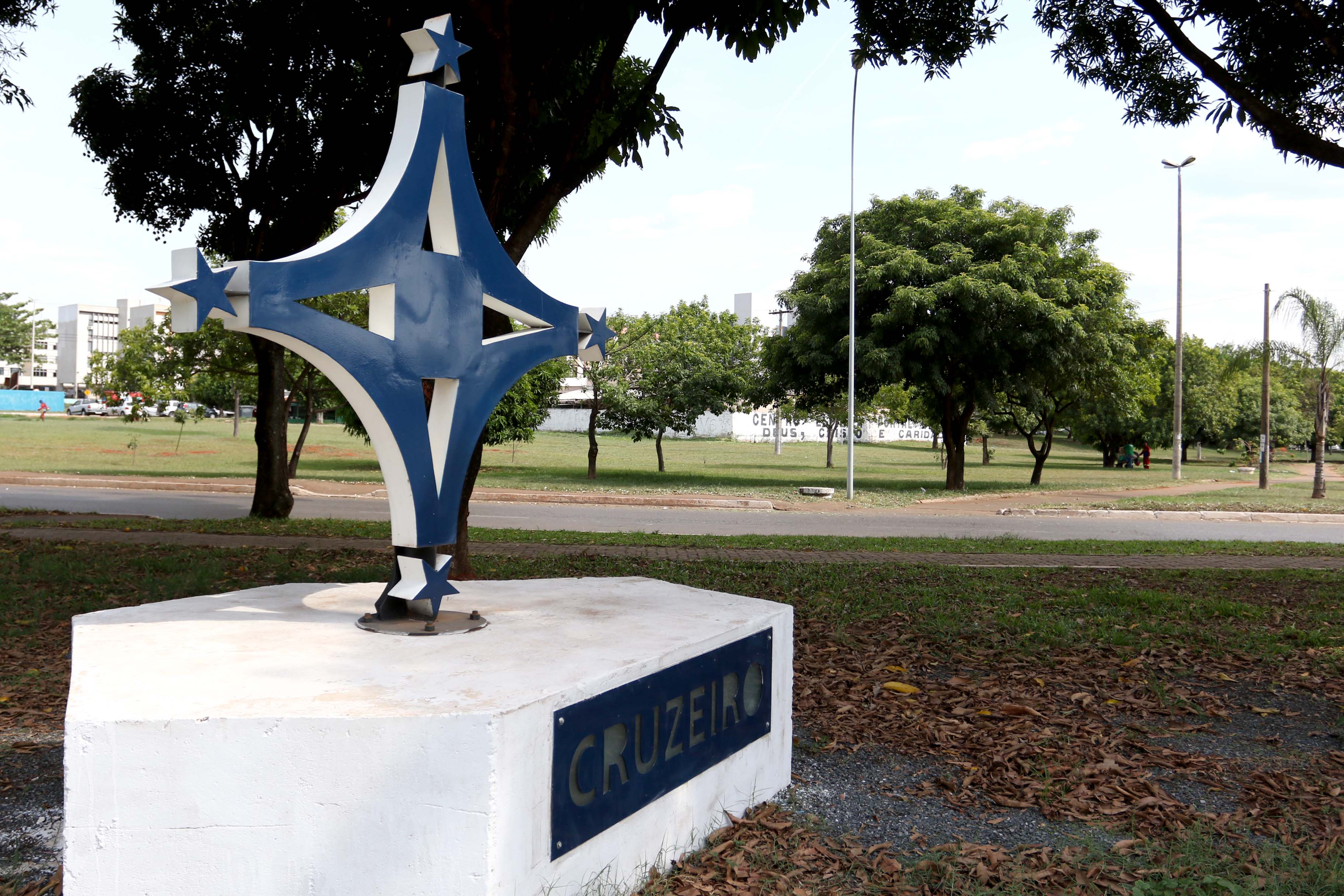
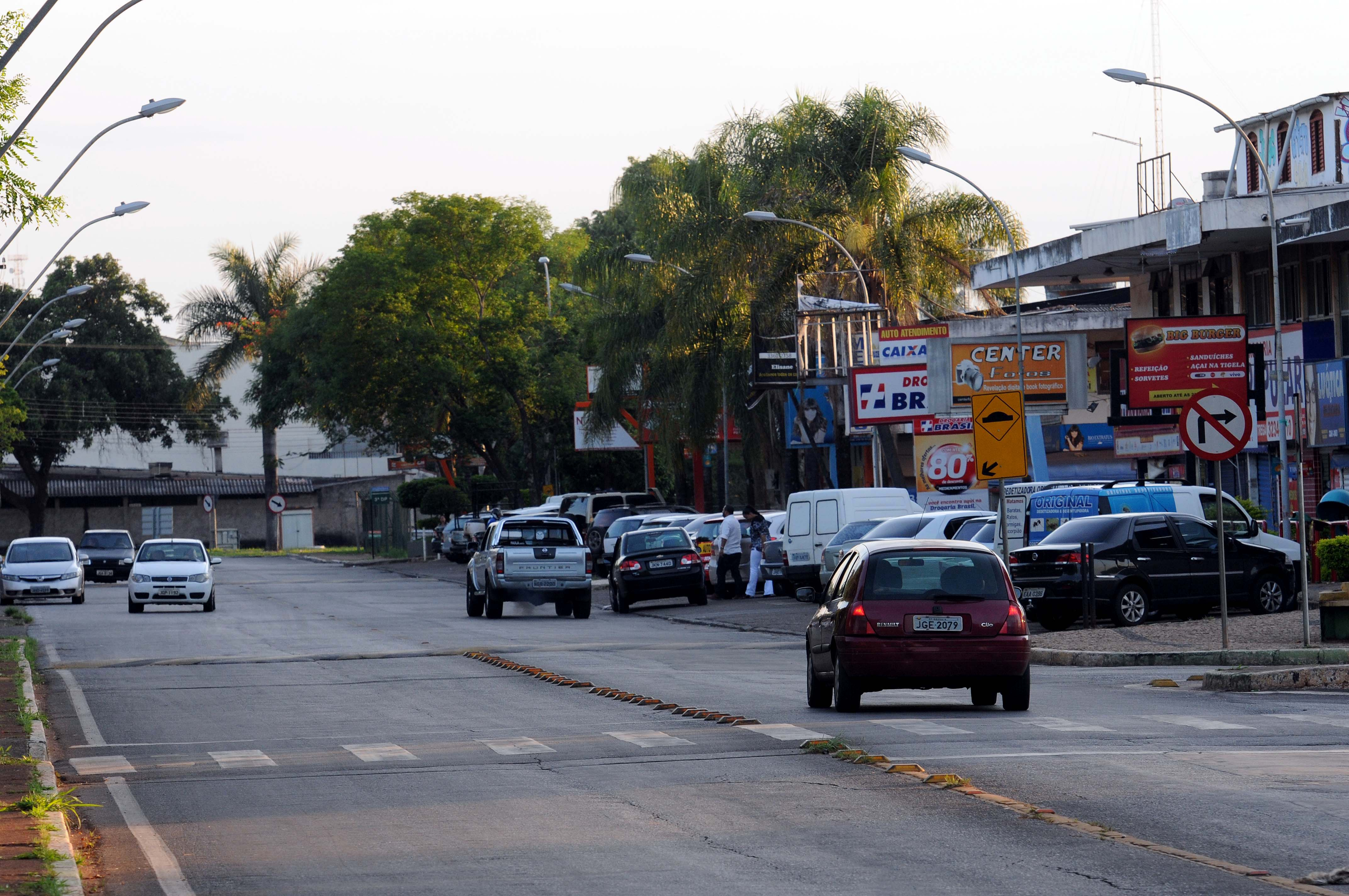
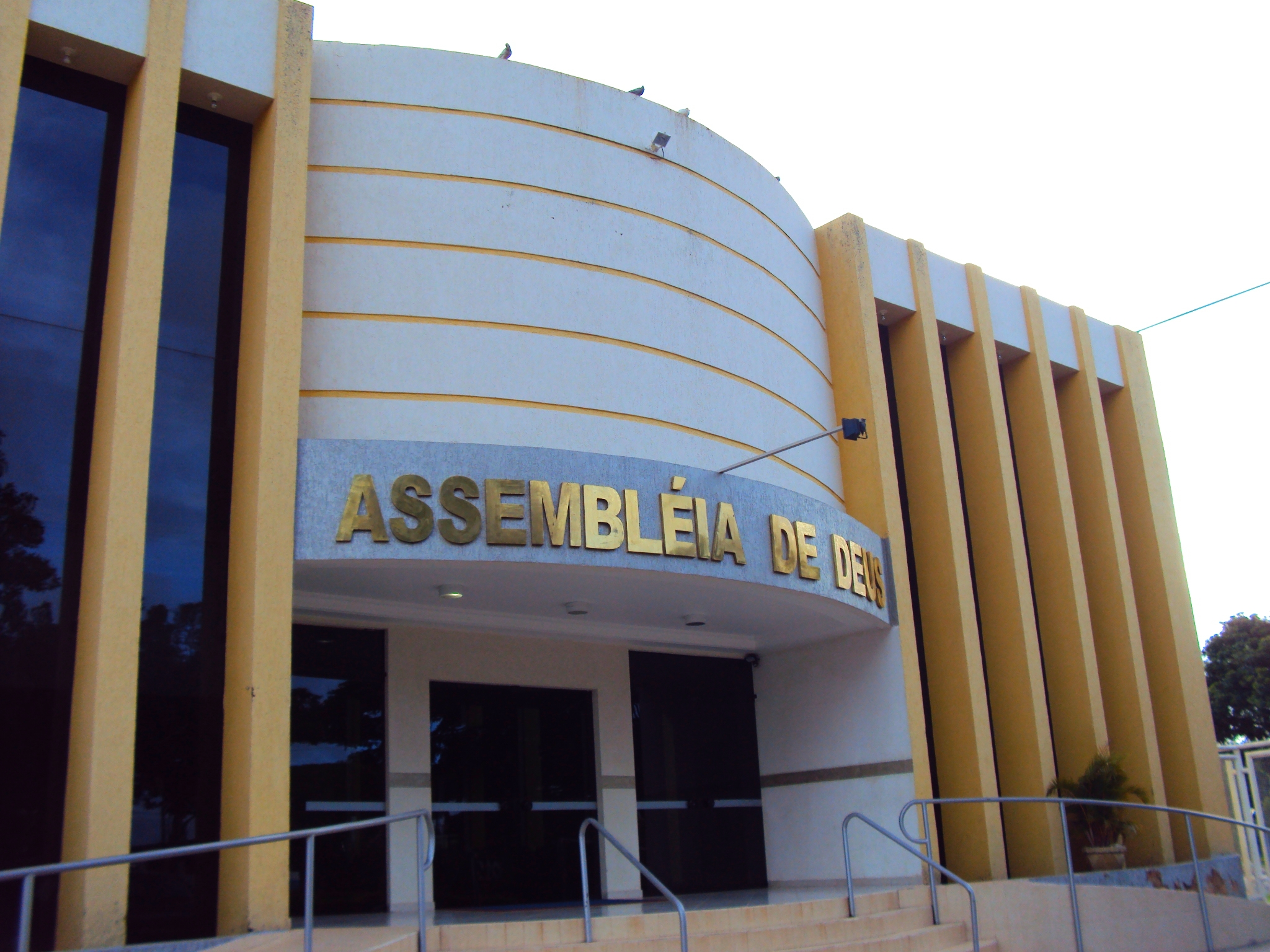
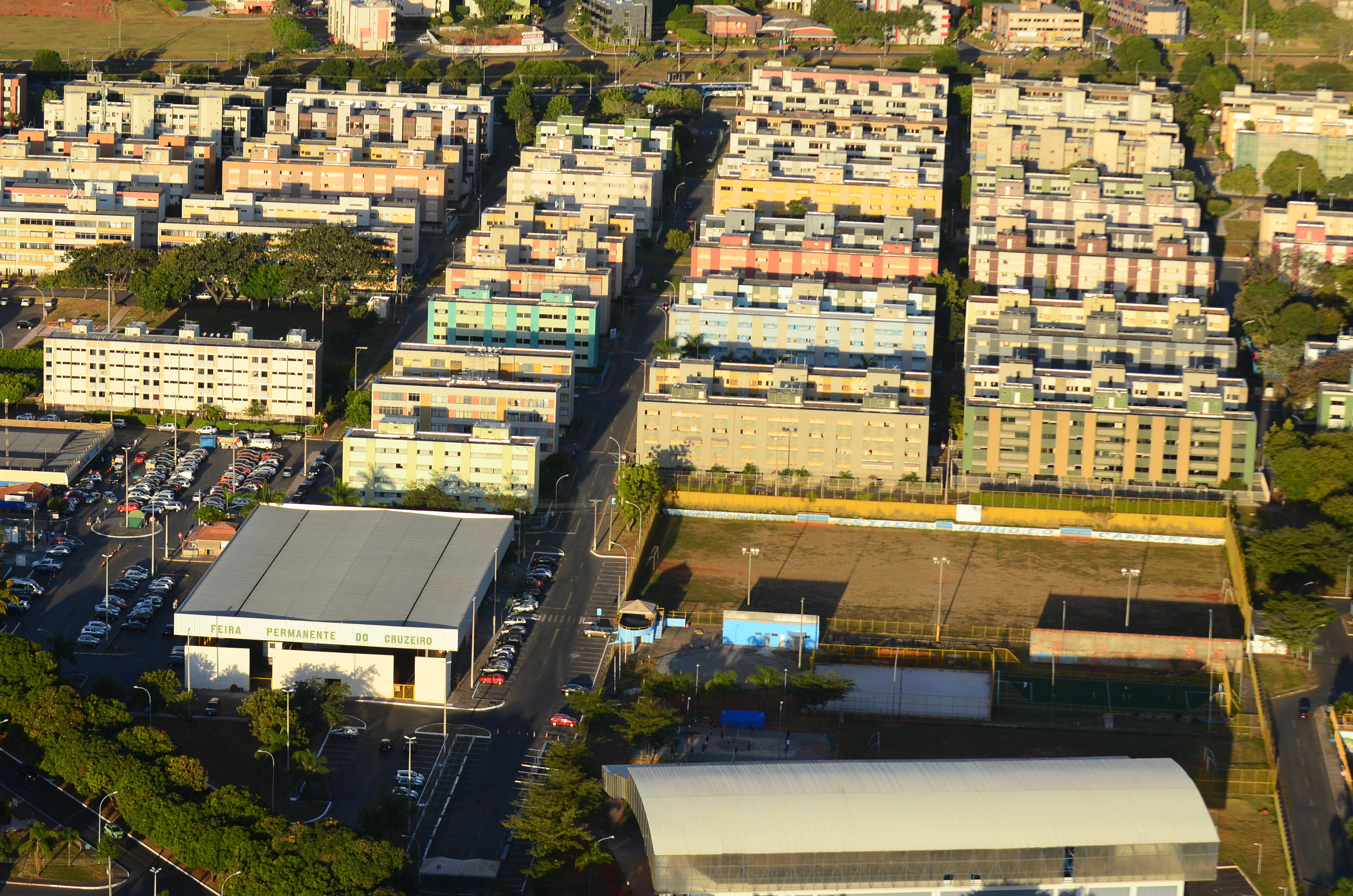
- Clockwise from top: Cruzeiro sculpture; Assembléia de Deus do Cruzeiro; Top view of Cruzeiro; Road

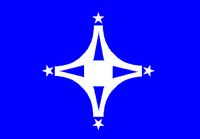
- Flag

- Location of Cruzeiro in the Federal District
- Coordinates: 15°47′27″S 47°56′14″W
- Country: Brazil
- Region: Central-West
- State: Federal District
- Established: November 30, 1959

Government
  - Regional administrator: Hélio dos Santos

Area
  - Total: 3.1 km^{2} (1.2 sq mi)

Population
  - Total: 33,539
- Time zone: UTC−3 (BRT)
- Postal Code (CEP): 70650-XXX / 70658-XXX
- Area code: +55 61
- Website: www.cruzeiro.df.gov.br

Cruzeiro (Portuguese pronunciation: [kɾuˈzei.ɾu]) is an administrative region in the Federal District in Brazil. It is bordered by SIA and Brasília (Note: Both are included in the area of the UNESCO World Heritage Site) to the north, and Sudoeste/Octogonal to the southeast. Created in 1959, Cruzeiro is divided into two broad sections: the original town, Cruzeiro Velho, made up mostly of one- and two-story houses, and Cruzeiro Novo, made up of several similar four-story buildings since 1970. Cruzeiro has a total area of 319.3 hectares. As of 2018, the region has an estimated 31,079 inhabitants.

== History ==
Cruzeiro was originally conceived as a residential area to host public servants from the old capital, Rio de Janeiro whose workplaces would be moved to Brasília, such as clerical workers, firemen, policemen and military officers and their families. Cruzeiro hosts two military areas, one of which contains the Armed Forces Hospital (HFA) and the Urban Military Sector (SMU), a military housing project. Cruzeiro was founded on November 30, 1959, receiving the status of administrative region, according to Law 49, of October 25, 1989.

In 1974 and 1989, respectively, the neighborhoods of Octogonal and Sudoeste (SHCSW) were developed within Cruzeiro. In 2003 they were separated to make up the Federal District's administrative region, Sudoeste/Octogonal.

Cruzeiro is home to Associação Recreativa Unidos do Cruzeiro (ARUC), Brasília's samba school and is within Brasília's UNESCO World Heritage Site area.

== Geography ==
Cruzeiro is located in the Brazilian Highlands, in the Central-West region of Brazil.

=== Climate ===
Cruzeiro has a Tropical Savanna climate (Köppen: Aw). The climate has two distinct seasons, the rainy season, from October to April, and the dry season, from May to September. During the dry season, the city can have very low relative humidity levels, often below 30%. The average temperature is 21.4 °C (70.5 °F).

== See also ==
- List of administrative regions of the Federal District
