= Heterocoma =

Scientific classification
- Kingdom: Plantae
- Clade: Tracheophytes
- Clade: Angiosperms
- Clade: Eudicots
- Clade: Asterids
- Order: Asterales
- Family: Asteraceae
- Subfamily: Cichorioideae
- Tribe: Vernonieae
- Genus: Heterocoma; Augustin Pyramus de Candolle

Type species
- Heterocoma albida (DC. ex Pers.) DC.

Synonyms
- Alcantara Glaz. ex G.M.Barroso; Bishopalea H.Rob.; Sipolisia Glaz. ex Oliv.; Xerxes J.R.Grant

Genus of flowering plants

Heterocoma is a genus of flowering plants in the family Asteraceae.

Heterocoma was believed for many years to contain only one species, until 2013, when two new species were described and the three genera Bishopalea, Sipolisia, and Xerxes were merged into Heterocoma. All are endemic to the Brazilian Highlands.

Species:

- Heterocoma albida
- Heterocoma ekmaniana
- Heterocoma erecta
- Heterocoma gracilis
- Heterocoma lanuginosa
- Heterocoma robinsoniana

formerly included

Heterocoma bifrons (DC. ex Pers.) DC. – Chronopappus bifrons (DC. ex Pers.) DC.
