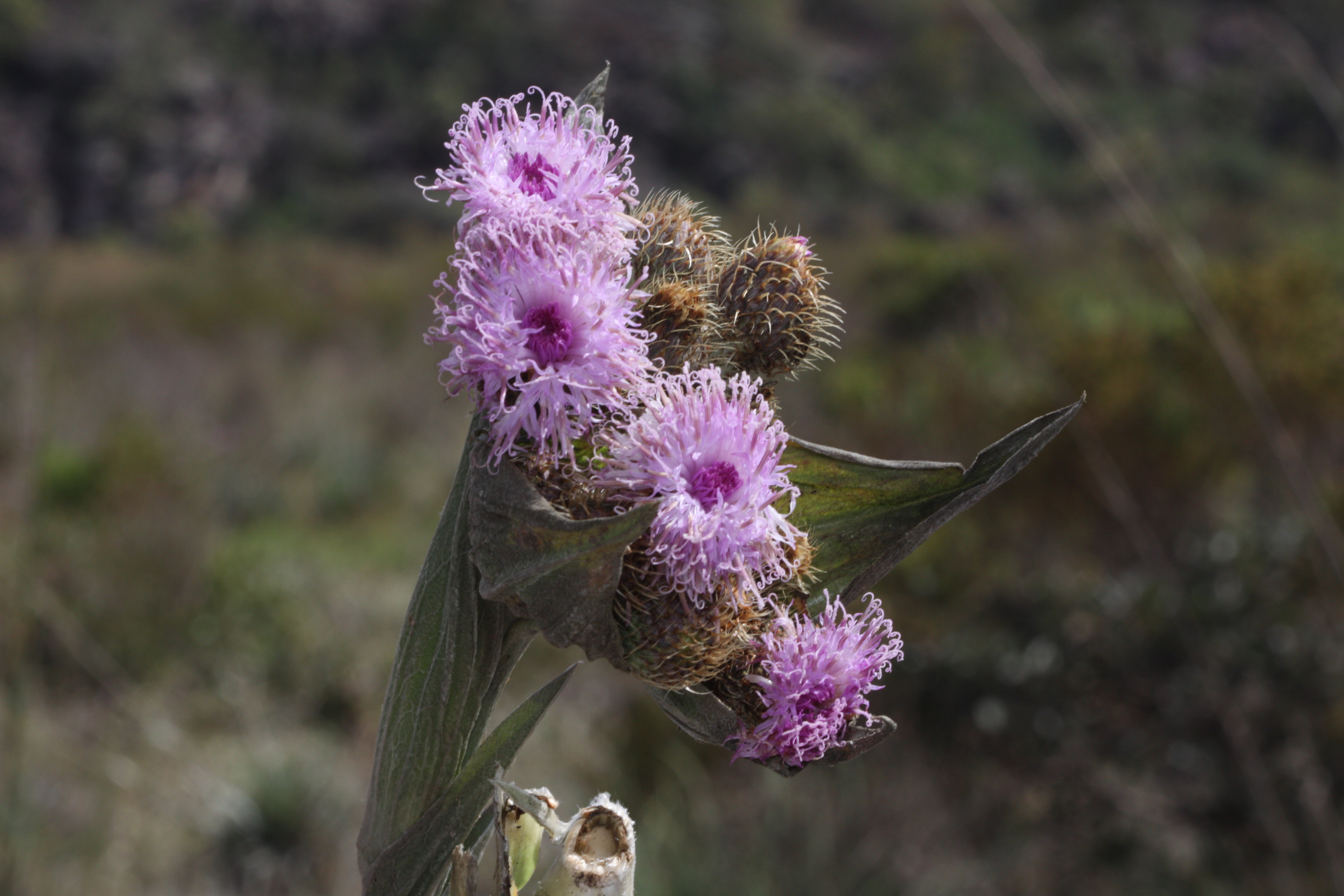

Scientific classification
- Kingdom: Plantae
- Clade: Tracheophytes
- Clade: Angiosperms
- Clade: Eudicots
- Clade: Asterids
- Order: Asterales
- Family: Asteraceae
- Genus: Proteopsis
- Species: P. argentea

Binomial name
- Proteopsis argentea Mart. & Zucc. ex Sch. Bip

Synonyms
- Proteopsis argentea Mart. & Zucc. ex DC.; Vernonia proteopsis DC.

= Proteopsis argentea =

Species of flowering plant

Proteopsis argentea is a species of flowering plant in the family Asteraceae. It is native to Brazil.
