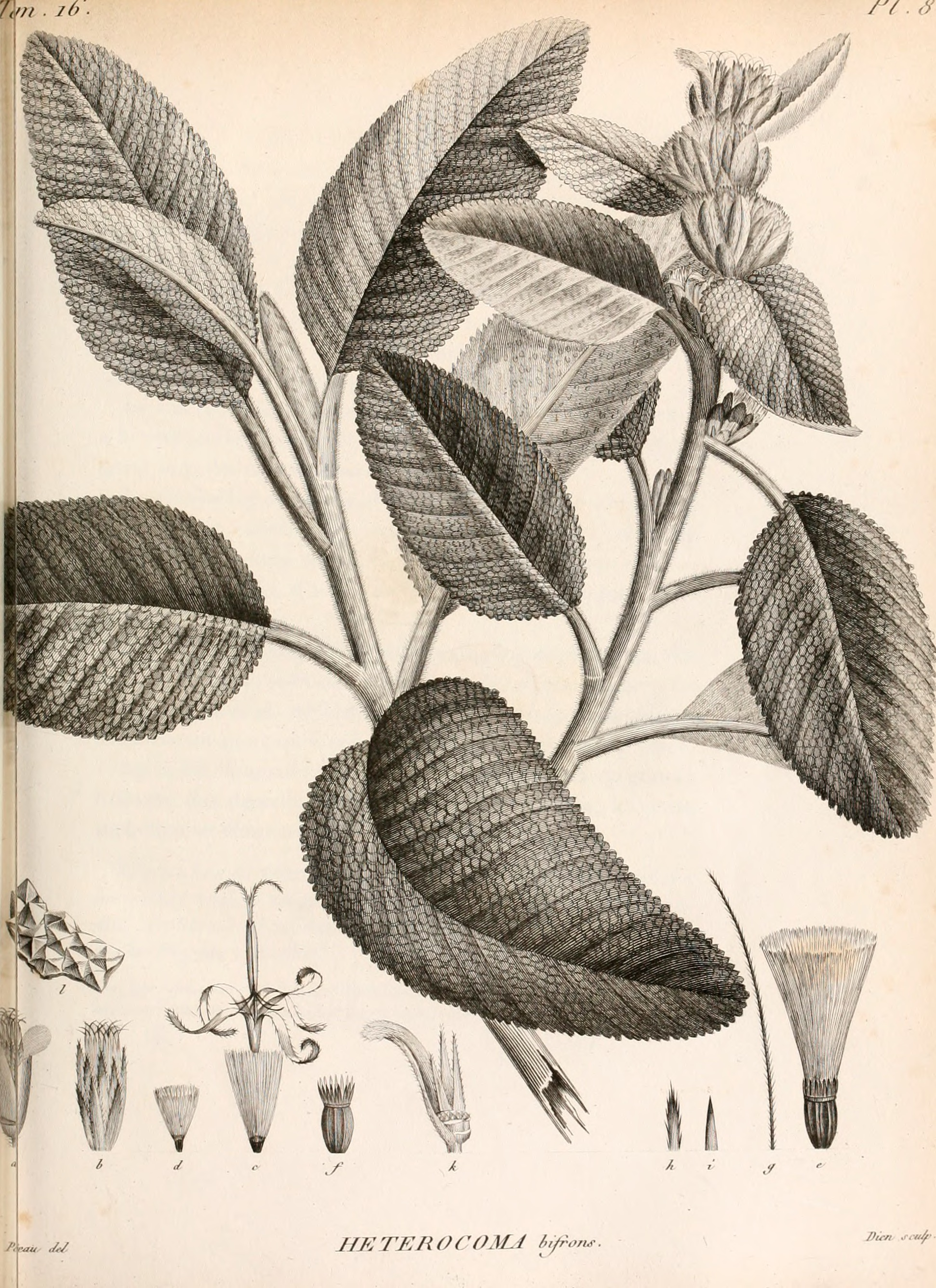
- 1810 botanical drawing of Heterocoma bifrons (now Chronopappus bifrons)

Scientific classification
- Kingdom: Plantae
- Clade: Tracheophytes
- Clade: Angiosperms
- Clade: Eudicots
- Clade: Asterids
- Order: Asterales
- Family: Asteraceae
- Subfamily: Cichorioideae
- Tribe: Vernonieae
- Genus: Chronopappus; DC.

Species
- See text.

= Chronopappus =

Genus of flowering plants

Chronopappus is a genus of flowering plants in the family Asteraceae.

As of May 2024, Plants of the World Online accepted two species, both native to southeast Brazil:

- Chronopappus bifrons (Pers.) DC.
- Chronopappus lanatus Loeuille, Semir & Pirani
