= Águas Claras, Federal District =

Águas Claras
- Administrative region
- Região Administrativa de Águas Claras; Administrative Region of Águas Claras
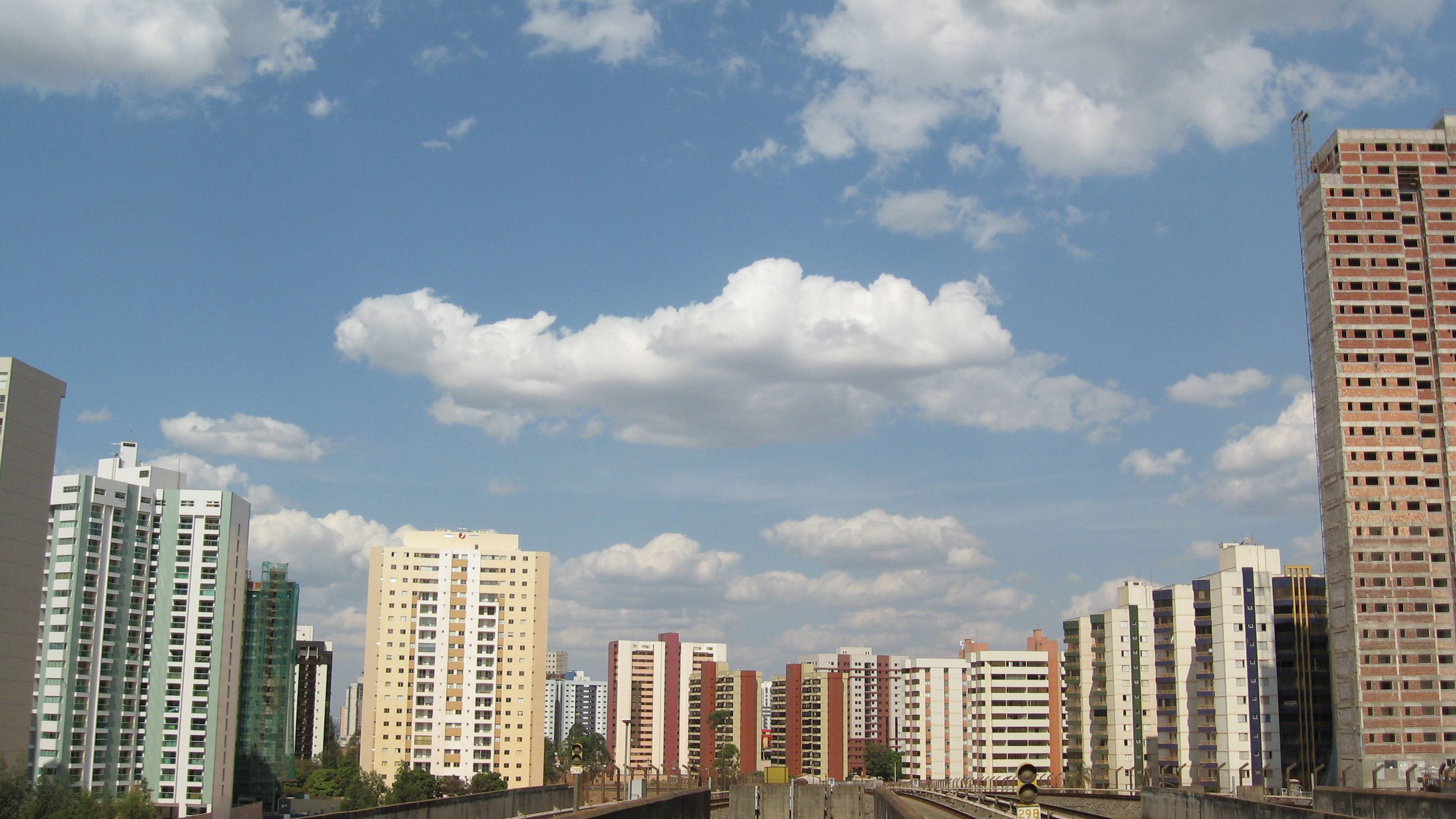
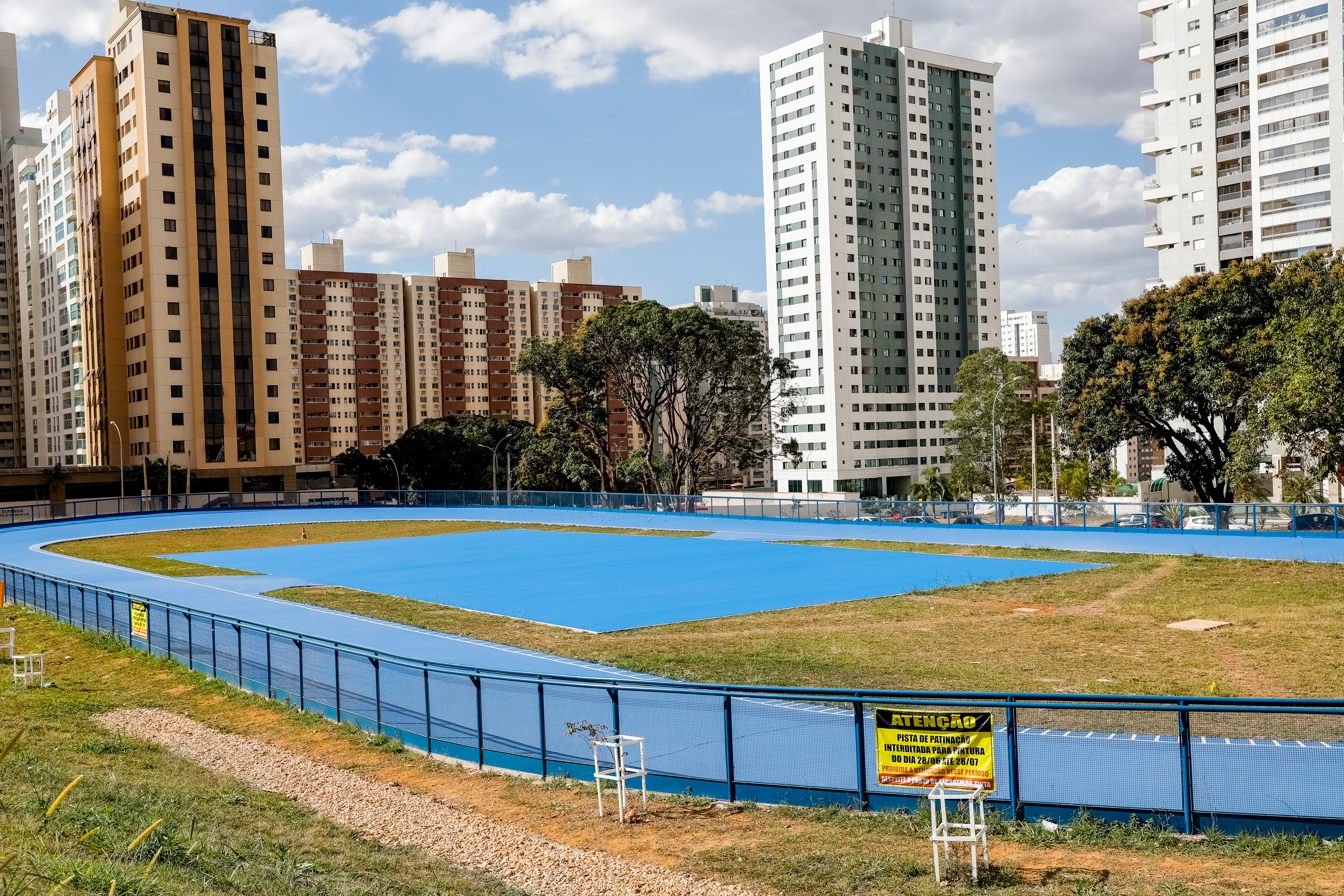
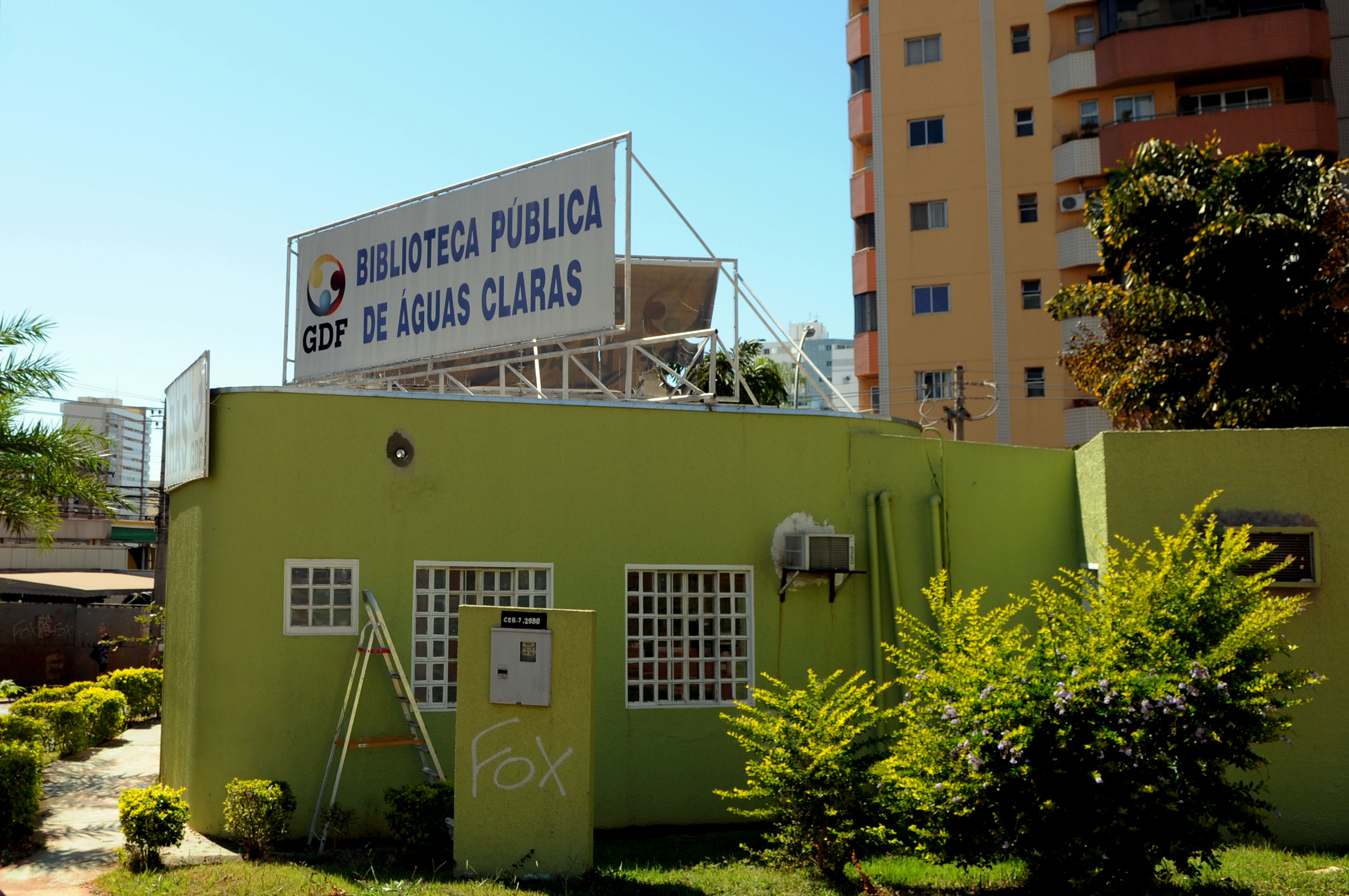
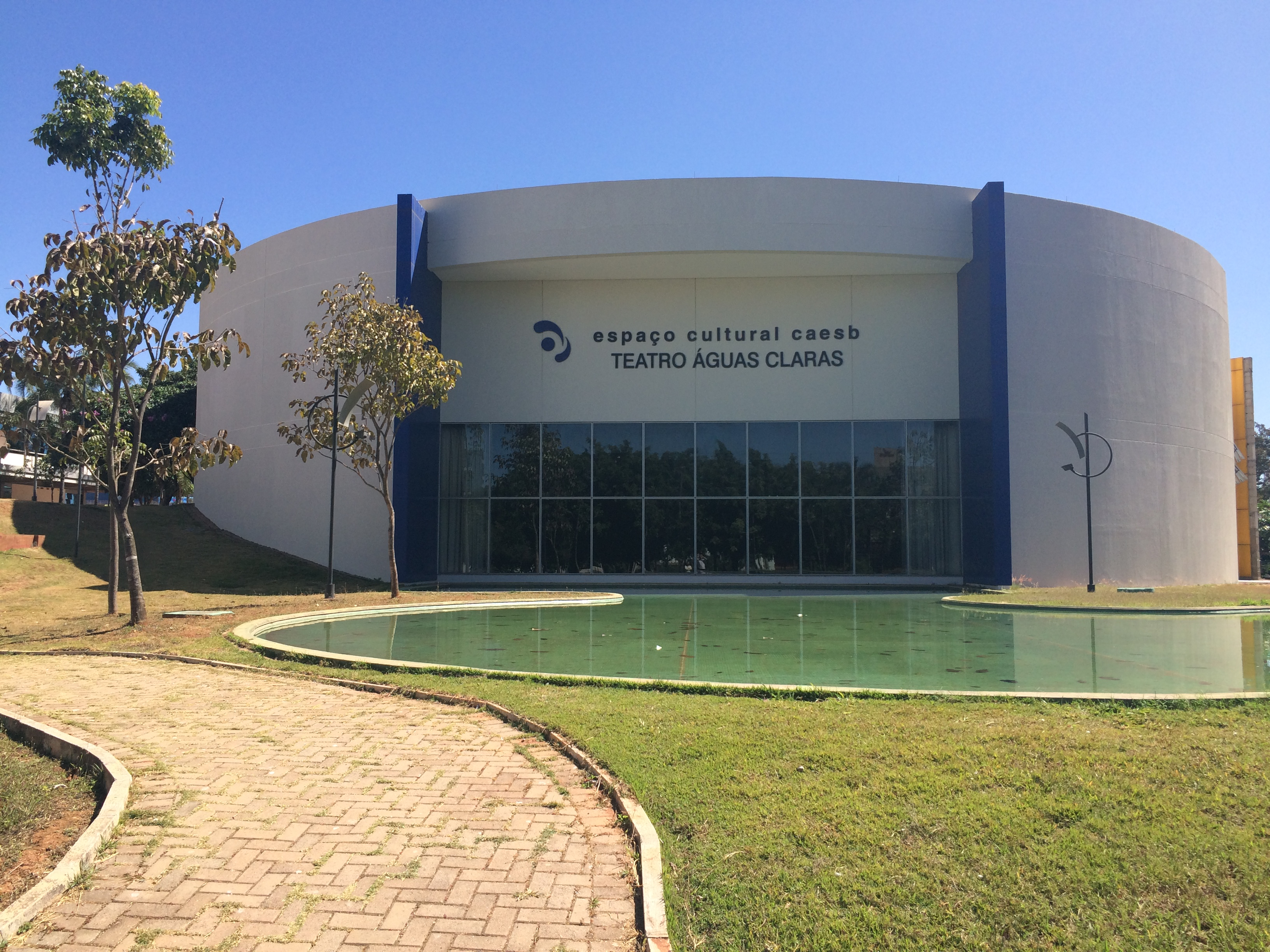
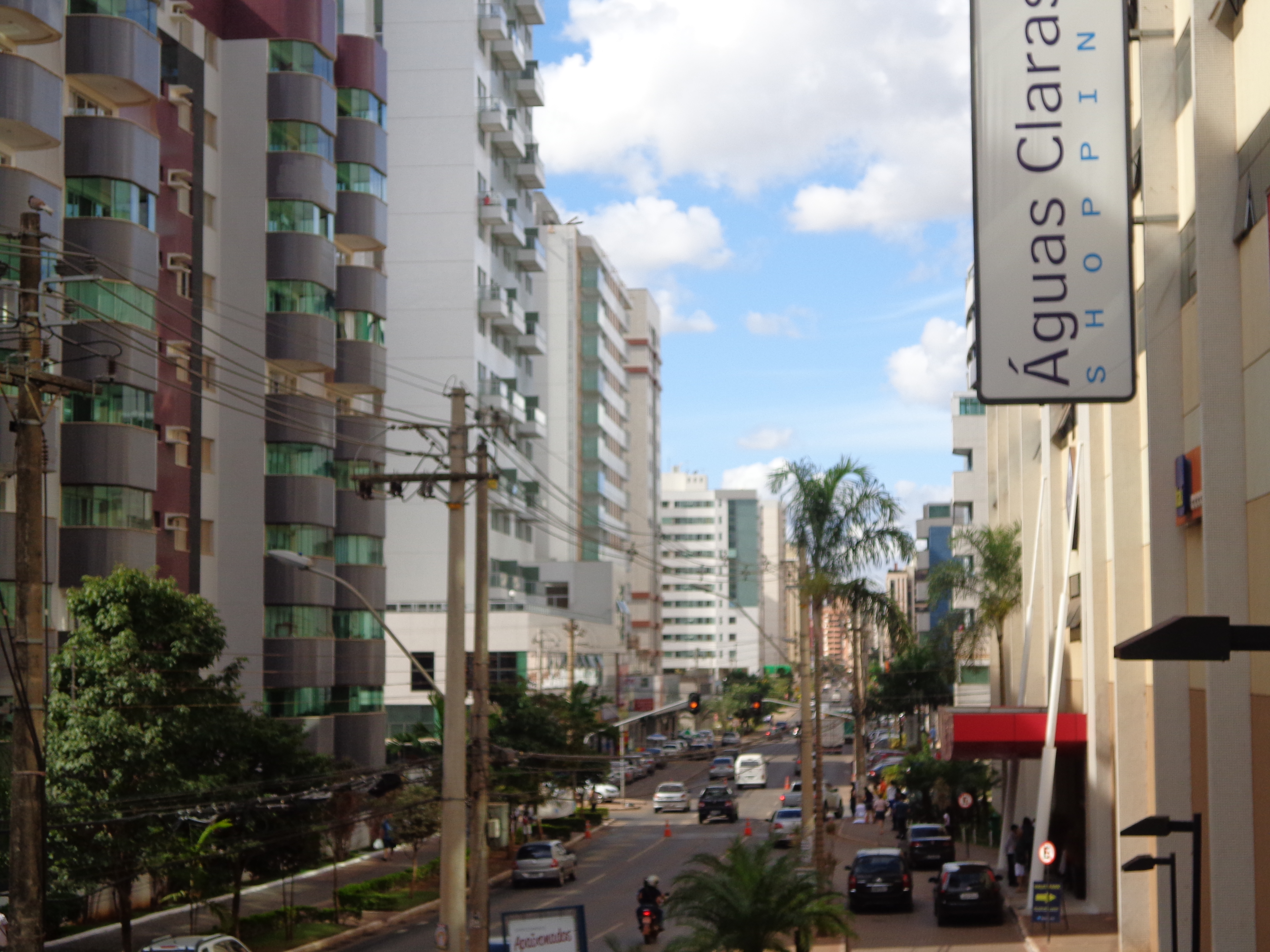
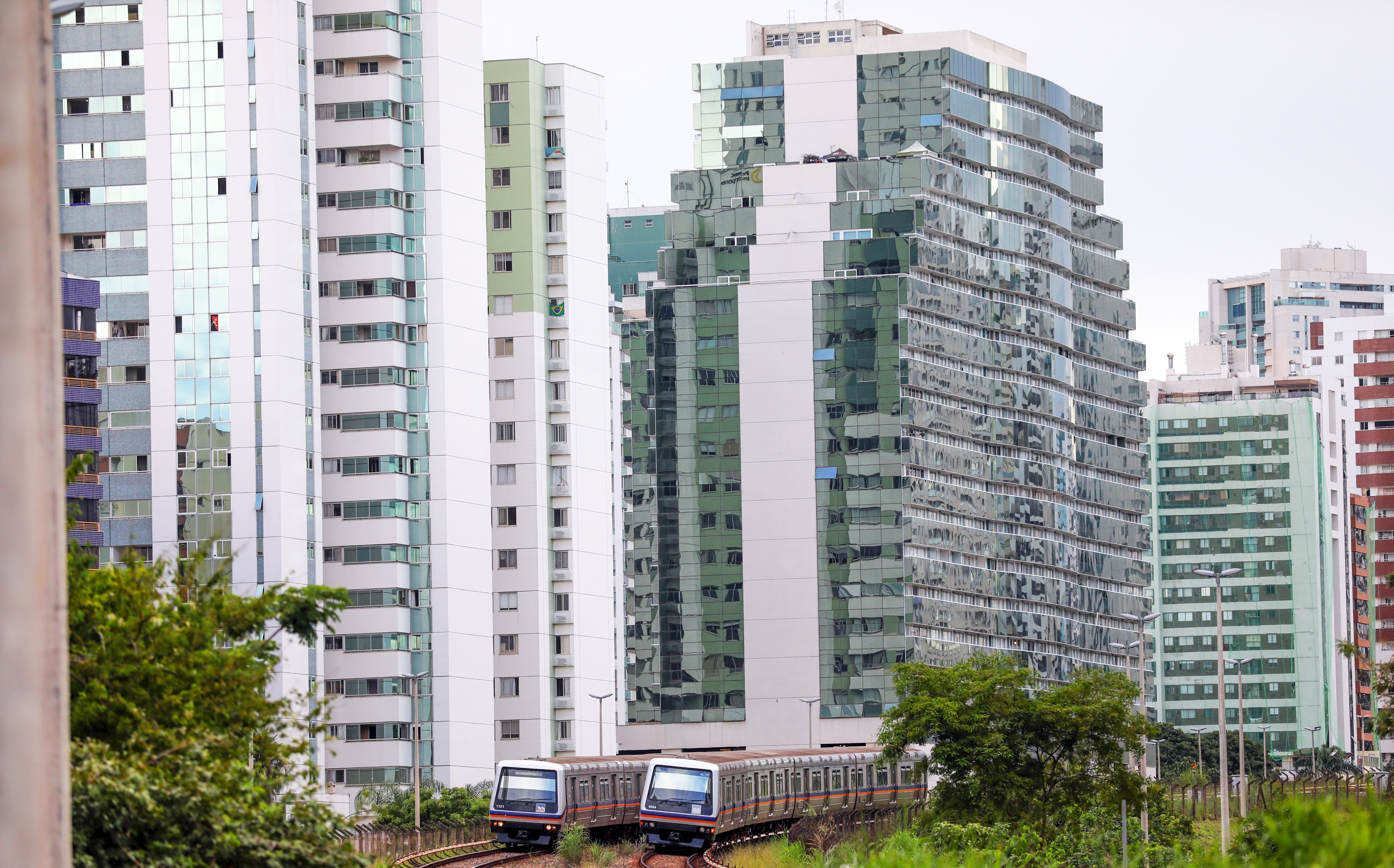
- Clockwise from top: Skyline from the Metro station, Águas Claras Public Library, Castanheiras Ave., Metro, Águas Claras Theatre, Parque Sul

- Location in the Federal District
- Coordinates: 15°50′25″S 48°01′40″W
- Country: Brazil
- Region: Central-West
- State: Federal District
- Founded: December 16, 1992

Government
  - Regional administrator: Manoel Valdeci Machado Elias

Area
  - Total: 31.5 km^{2} (12.2 sq mi)

Population (2010)
  - Total: 135,685
  - Density: 4,307/km^{2} (11,160/sq mi)
- Time zone: UTC−3 (BRT)
- Area code: +55 61
- Website: www.aguasclaras.df.gov.br

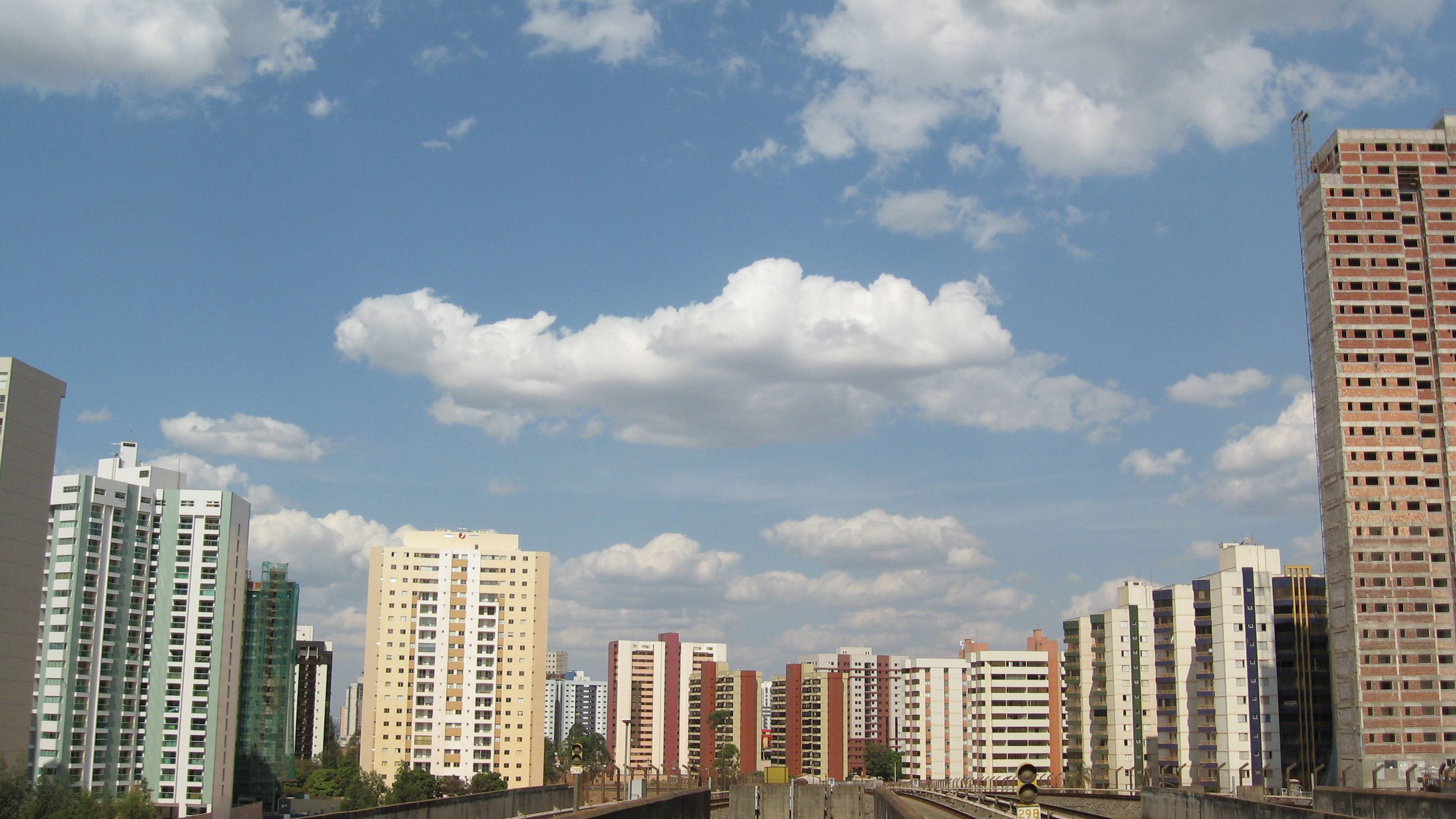
View from the subway station

Águas Claras (Portuguese pronunciation: [ˈa.ɡuɐs ˈkla.ɾɐs]) is an administrative region in the Federal District in Brazil. It is bordered by Vicente Pires to the north, Guará and Park Way to the east, Arniqueira to the south, and Taguatinga to the west.

== Etymology ==
The region's name, Portuguese for clear waters, is a reference to the stream within the region which flows into the Paranoá Lake.

== History ==
=== Early history ===
On December 16, 1992, District Law 385 authorized the implementation of Águas Claras, then part of Taguatinga; its occupation plan was approved later that same year. Designed by architect and urbanist Paulo Zimbres, Águas Claras began construction shortly afterwards. Águas Claras was founded on December 16, 1992, receiving the status of administrative region, according to Law 3153, of May 6, 2003. Which separated it from Taguatinga.

Águas Claras was notable for its accelerated growth, with large and diversified real estate developments.

Águas Claras has an area of approximately 31.5 km^{2} and a population of just over 135 thousand.

== Geography ==
Águas Claras is located in the Brazilian highlands, in the Central-West region of Brazil.

== Subdivisions ==
Águas Claras is divided into the areas of Águas Claras Vertical (with buildings with up to 32 floors), Areal, Setor Habitacional Arniqueiras (comprising the Arniqueiras, Vereda da Cruz and Vereda Grande housing developments) and Área de Desenvolvimento Econômico (ADE) (Economic Development Area), being formed by residential and commercial blocks.

== Economy ==
The administrative region was the 6th region with the most expensive launches in Brazil in 2012, according to Lopes' "Anuário do Mercado Imobiliário Brasileiro da Lopes", with nine developments, totaling 1,607 units and 619 million reais in "General Sales Value." Comparatively, the Federal District was the fourth largest national market in 2012, with launches totaling a 3.3 billion reais GVS.

== Infrastructure ==
=== Metro ===
Águas Claras is split into two areas by the Federal District Metro lines and has four stations: Arniqueiras, Águas Claras, Concessionárias, and Estrada Parque. The city is served by regular bus lines to Plano Piloto, Taguatinga and Ceilândia. With the inauguration of a set of four viaducts on January 24, 2009, the Araucárias and Castanheiras Avenues and the Boulervards bordering the subway line became one-way streets, thus promoting the fluidity of the local traffic.

=== Roads ===
The renovation of the Taguatinga Park Road (EPTG), partially delivered to the population in November 2010, reduced the travel time between Águas Claras and the central region of Brasília. With more lanes and marginal roads to help the flow of vehicles, the EPTG is now part of the "Green Line", part of the Integrated Brasília project. Planned in the initial project, the EPTG bike lane was only partially delivered in 2019. The project also foresees the implementation of an exclusive bus lane, the BRT-Oeste.

Another project planned for the region is the construction of the Estrada Parque Interbairros (EPIB), which will connect the central region of Brasília to Samambaia, passing next to Águas Claras.

Public transportation is still insufficient, repeating a chronic problem present throughout the Federal District. Many bus stops in Águas Claras still have no shelters, causing inconvenience to users. Due to the expansion of the line and the inauguration of new subway stations in Ceilândia, in 2008, the subway system began to show signs of exhaustion, with delays and overcrowding of trains, jeopardizing one of the main means of connection between Águas Claras and other locations in the Federal District.

=== Health, education and safety ===
Águas Claras still lacks a hospital and public schools. In vertical Águas Claras there is a public daycare center. The 21st Police Station, which serves the region, is located in Areal. Since 2008, Military Police stations have been opened near Avenida Araucárias and Avenida Castanheiras. The lack of infrastructure for public services makes the population resort to existing services in Taguatinga or in the central region of Brasília.

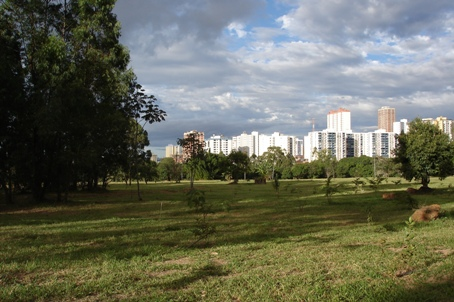
Park in Águas Claras

== See also ==
- List of administrative regions of the Federal District
