= Heterocoma ekmaniana =

Scientific classification
- Kingdom: Plantae
- Clade: Tracheophytes
- Clade: Angiosperms
- Clade: Eudicots
- Clade: Asterids
- Order: Asterales
- Family: Asteraceae
- Genus: Heterocoma
- Species: H. ekmaniana

Binomial name
- Heterocoma ekmaniana (Philipson) Loeuille, J.N.Nakaj. & Semir

Synonyms
- Alcantara ekmaniana (Philipson) H.Rob.; Proteopsis ekmaniana Philipson; Xerxes ekmanianum (Philipson) J.R.Grant; Alcantara isabellae Glaz.; Alcantara petroana Glaz. ex G.M.Barroso

Species of plant

Heterocoma ekmaniana is a species of flowering plant in the family Asteraceae. It is endemic to Brazil, and known from the states of Goiás and Minas Gerais.
