= Vicente Pires =

- Administrative region
- Região Administrativa de Vicente Pires; Administrative Region of Vicente Pires
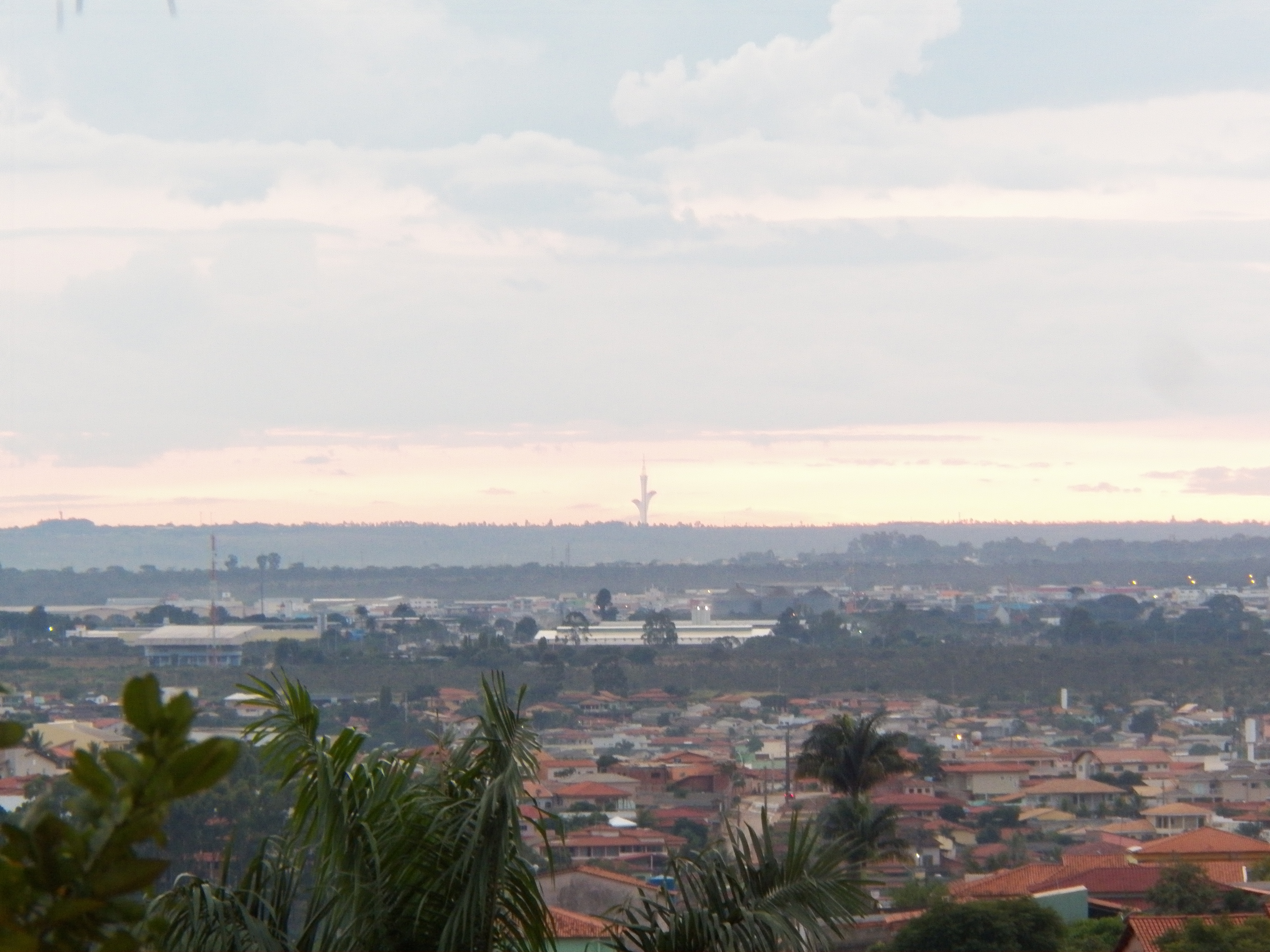
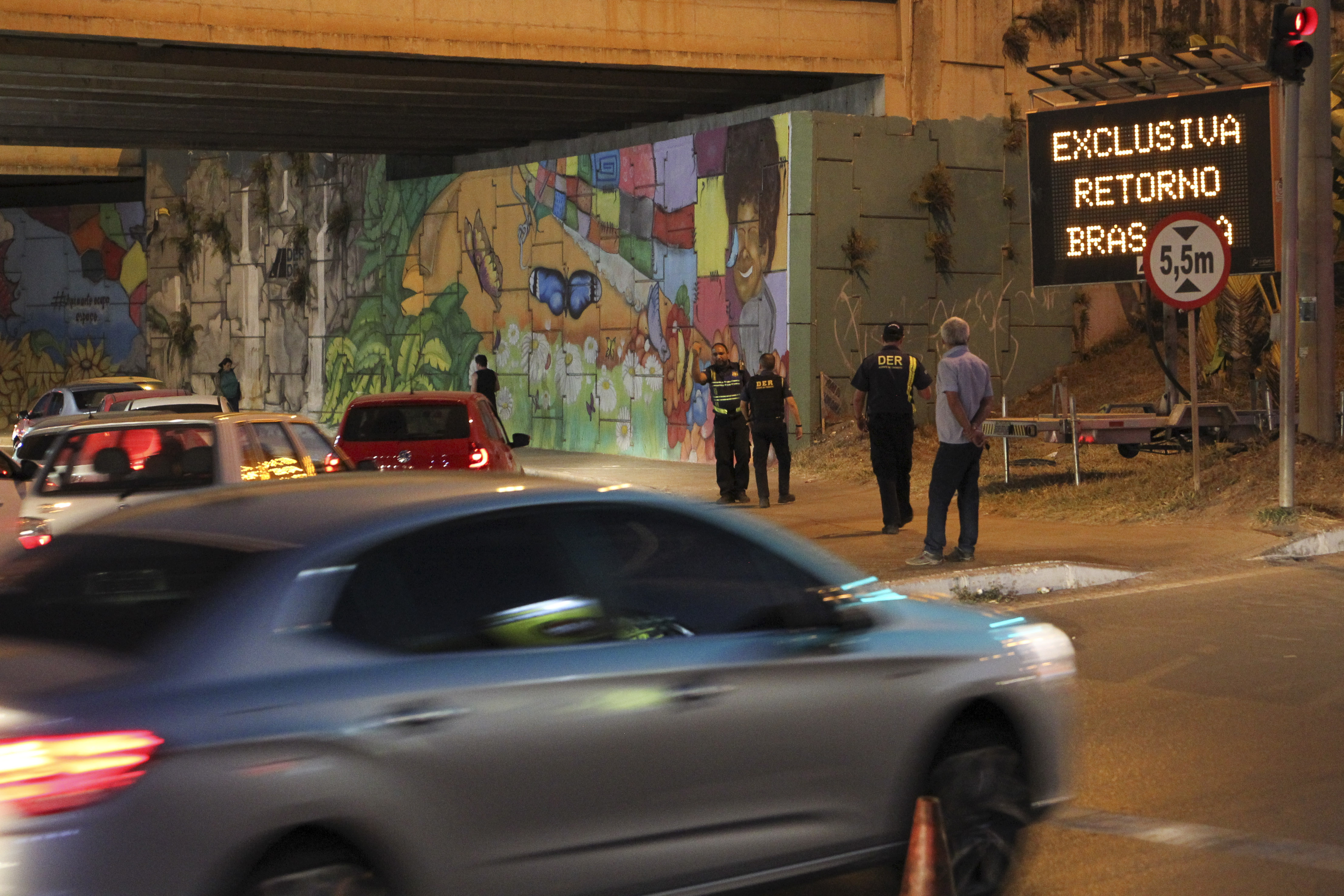
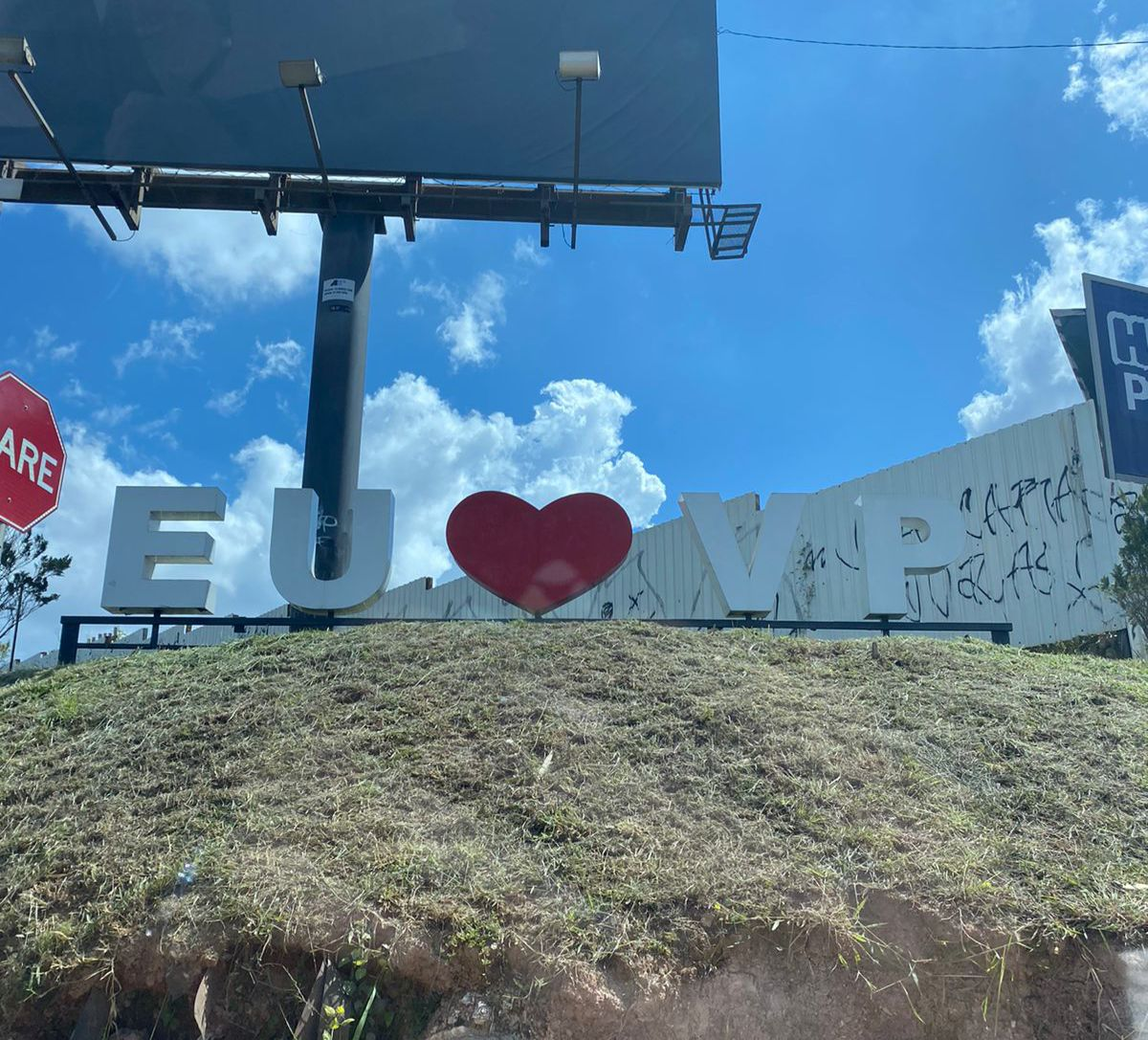
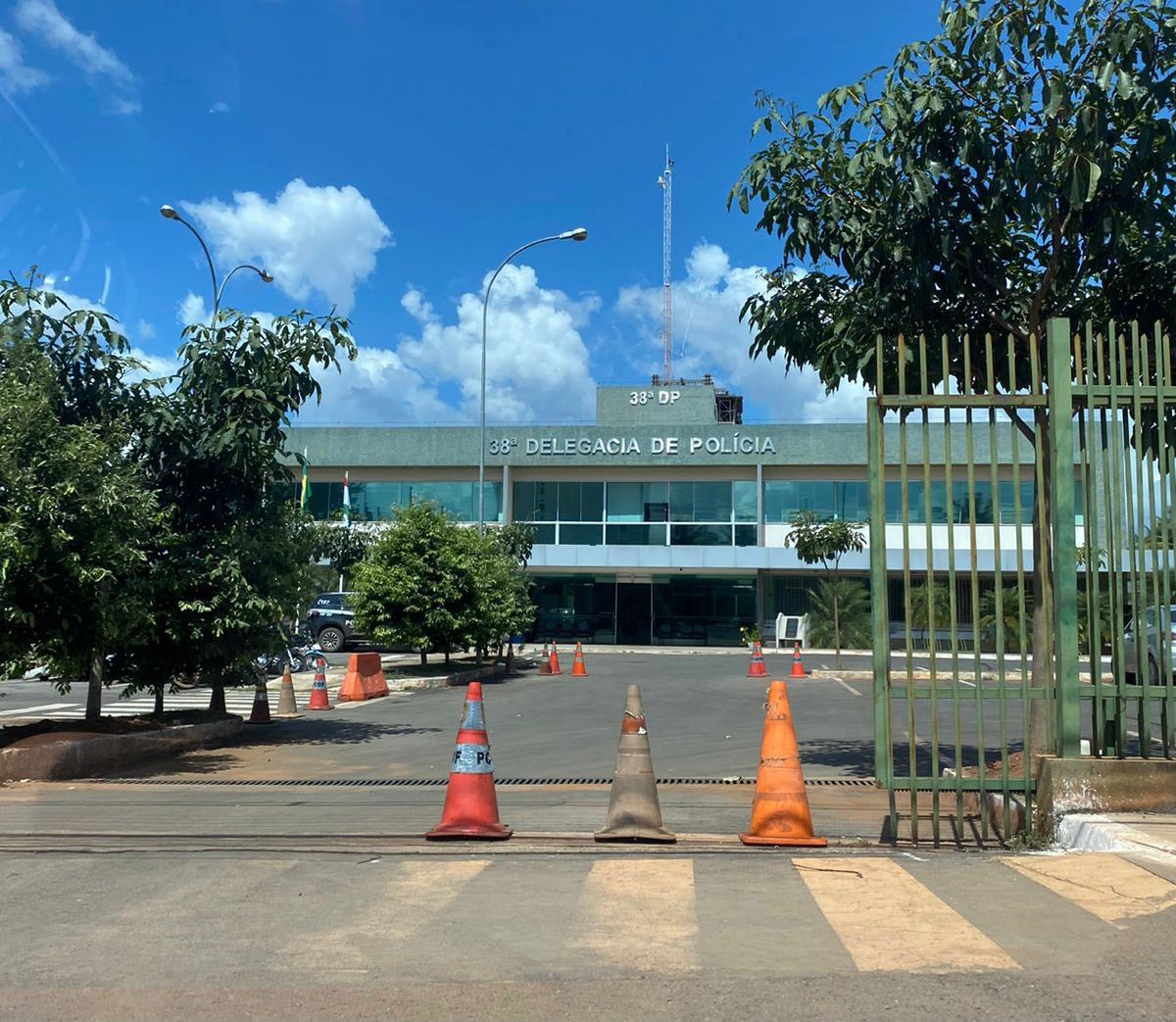
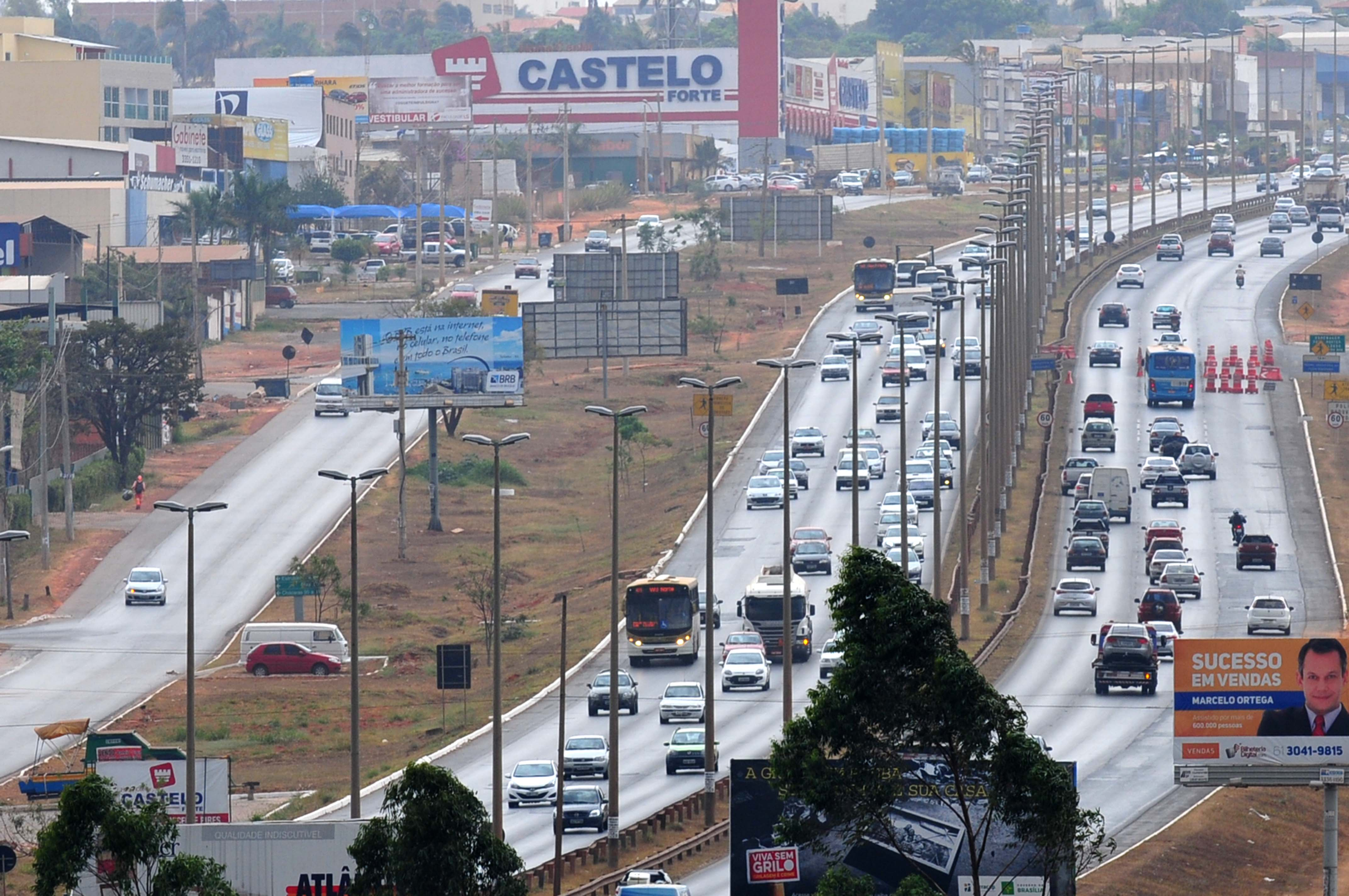
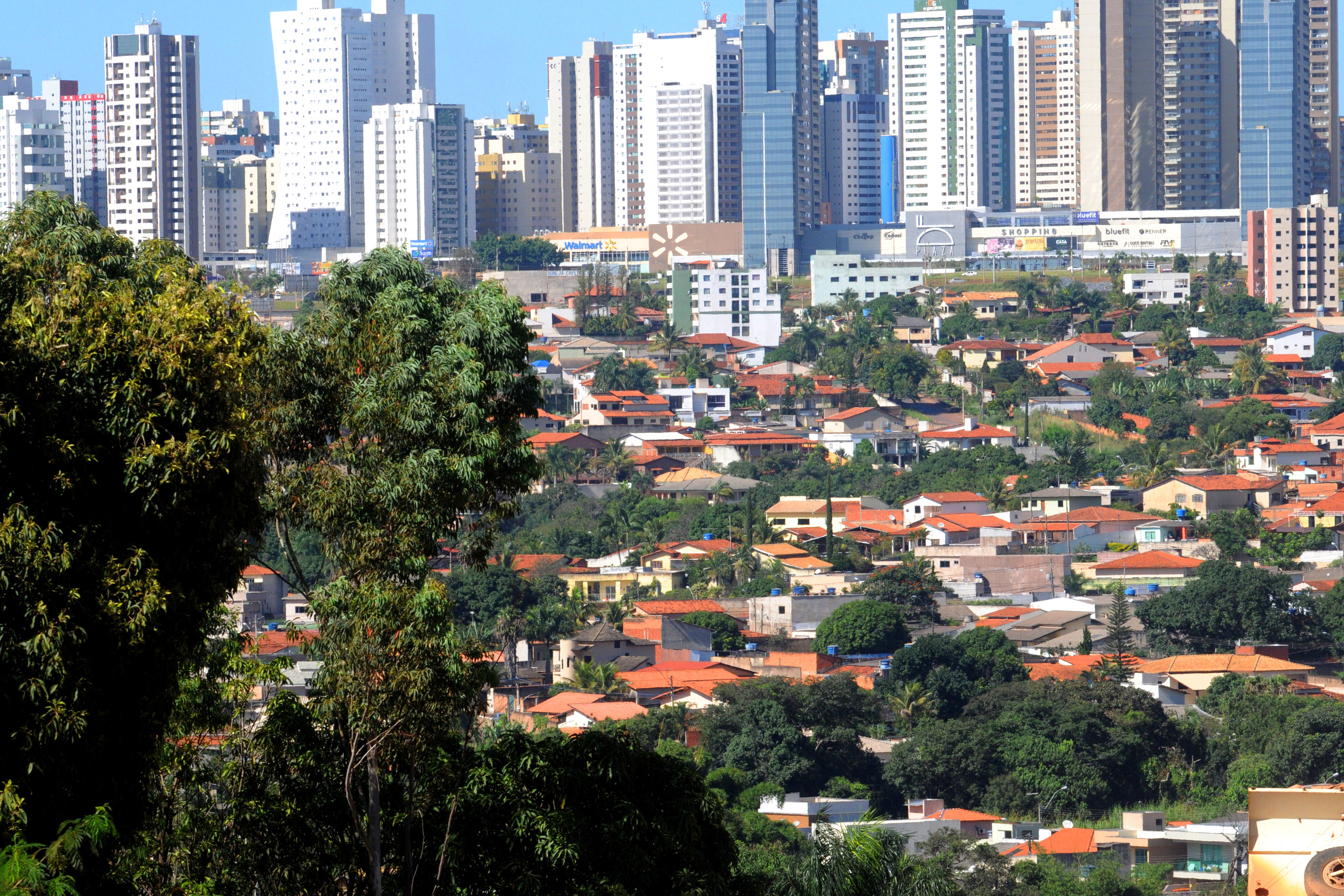
- Clockwise from top: City skyline, I love VP sign, 38th Police Station, Israel Pinheiro Viaduct, DF-095

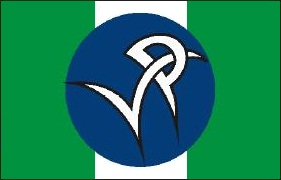
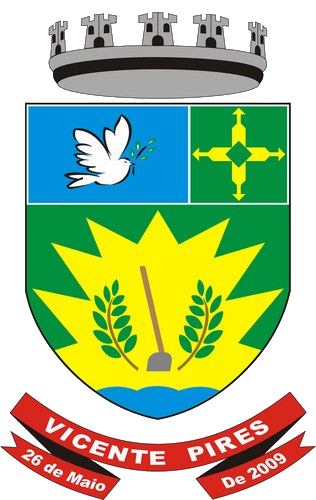
- Flag Coat of arms
- Nicknames: Buraco Pires, Vicentão
- Motto: Eu Amo Vicente Pires
- Location of Vicente Pires within Federal District
- Coordinates: 15°48′12″S 48°01′48″W
- Country: Brazil
- Region: Central-West
- State: Federal District
- Founded: 26 May 1989

Government
  - Regional administrator: Gilvando Galdino Fernandes

Area
  - Total: 25.74 km^{2} (9.94 sq mi)

Population (2016)
  - Total: 72,879
- Time zone: UTC−3 (BRT)
- Area code: +55 61
- Website: www.vicentepires.df.gov.br

Vicente Pires is an administrative region in the Federal District in Brazil. It is bordered by Taguatinga to the west, Águas Claras to the south, Guará to the southeast, Brasília to the north, and Brazlândia to the northwest. According to a 2016 report, Vicente Pires has a population of 72,879. Vicente Pires is the 16th largest administrative region by population.

== Etymology ==
The name for Vicente Pires is largely believed to have originated from Vicente Pires da Mota, who owned the Vicente Pires Agricultural Colony. The official origin for the name of the colony is from a stream in the region.

== History ==
The future lands of Vicente Pires were previously inhabited by Indians, and in the 70s by farmers. In 1989, the then Governor José Aparecido, decided to centralize the process of expanding the rural production area of the Águas Claras Agricultural Colony to the Agricultural Colonies of Vicente Pires, Samambaia and São José. Through an agreement intermediated by the GDF and carried out by means of the Zoobotanic Foundation, a land use contract for agricultural production was made with about 360 farmers, with a term of use stipulated in 30 years.

Vicente Pires was founded on May 26, 1989, receiving the status of administrative region, according to Law 4327, of May 26, 2009. Was dismembered from Taguatinga and started to have its own administration. This occurred 20 years after the first farms in the former agricultural colony were established. Vicente Pires then comes to comprise the Vicente Pires Housing Sector, Samambaia Housing Sector, São José Housing Sector and Cana-do-Reino Housing Sector.

Some streets were restored, but the population still suffers with the lack of proper road infrastructure and potholes. More recently, there have been investments to the administrative region's road infrastructure.

In May 2010, the Regional Administration of Vicente Pires held a contest among the public and private schools of the administrative region with students from 1st to 9th grade of elementary school to choose their civic symbols (flag, anthem and coat of arms). The name of the winners and their respective symbols can be found in the Diário Oficial do Distrito Federal (section 01-171 3 September 2010).

The regions of the Colonias Agrícolas Vicente Pires are part of the Urban Qualification and Expansion Zone, these are areas initially intended for rural use that have undergone urban occupation through the implementation of informal settlements, which have been slowly fought against.

== Geography ==
Vicente Pires is located in the Brazilian Highlands, in the Central-West region of Brazil. The Administrative Region is bordered by Taguatinga, Águas Claras, Guará, SCIA, SAI, Brazlândia and Brasília. Vicente Pires comprises 25.74 km^{2} (9.94 sq mi) of land area.

=== Climate ===
Vicente Pires has a Tropical Savanna climate (Köppen: Aw). The climate has two distinct seasons, the rainy season, from October to April, and the dry season, from May to September. During the dry season, the city can have very low relative humidity levels, often below 30%. The average temperature is 21.4 °C (70.5 °F).

Climate data for Vicente Pires
Month	Jan	Feb	Mar	Apr	May	Jun	Jul	Aug	Sep	Oct	Nov	Dec	Year
Record high °C (°F)	32.6 (90.7)	32.0 (89.6)	32.1 (89.8)	31.6 (88.9)	31.6 (88.9)	31.6 (88.9)	30.8 (87.4)	33.0 (91.4)	35.7 (96.3)	36.4 (97.5)	34.5 (94.1)	33.7 (92.7)	36.4 (97.5)
Mean daily maximum °C (°F)	26.9 (80.4)	27.2 (81.0)	27.0 (80.6)	26.8 (80.2)	26.0 (78.8)	25.3 (77.5)	25.6 (78.1)	27.4 (81.3)	29.1 (84.4)	29.0 (84.2)	27.0 (80.6)	26.8 (80.2)	27.0 (80.6)
Daily mean °C (°F)	21.9 (71.4)	21.9 (71.4)	21.8 (71.2)	21.6 (70.9)	20.3 (68.5)	19.3 (66.7)	19.3 (66.7)	21.0 (69.8)	22.8 (73.0)	23.1 (73.6)	21.7 (71.1)	21.7 (71.1)	21.4 (70.5)
Mean daily minimum °C (°F)	18.3 (64.9)	18.2 (64.8)	18.2 (64.8)	17.7 (63.9)	15.6 (60.1)	14.2 (57.6)	13.9 (57.0)	15.3 (59.5)	17.6 (63.7)	18.5 (65.3)	18.1 (64.6)	18.3 (64.9)	17.0 (62.6)
Record low °C (°F)	12.2 (54.0)	11.0 (51.8)	14.5 (58.1)	10.7 (51.3)	1.4 (34.5)	3.3 (37.9)	1.6 (34.9)	5.0 (41.0)	9.0 (48.2)	10.2 (50.4)	11.4 (52.5)	11.4 (52.5)	1.4 (34.5)
Average precipitation mm (inches)	206.0 (8.11)	179.5 (7.07)	226.0 (8.90)	145.2 (5.72)	26.9 (1.06)	3.3 (0.13)	1.5 (0.06)	16.3 (0.64)	38.1 (1.50)	141.8 (5.58)	253.1 (9.96)	241.1 (9.49)	1,478.8 (58.22)
Average precipitation days (≥ 1.0 mm)	16	14	15	9	3	1	0	2	4	10	17	18	109
Average relative humidity (%)	74.7	74.2	76.1	72.2	65.4	58.8	51.0	43.5	46.4	58.8	74.5	76.0	64.3
Mean monthly sunshine hours	159.6	158.9	168.7	200.8	237.9	247.6	268.3	273.5	225.7	191.3	138.3	145.0	2,415.6
Average ultraviolet index	14	14	14	12	9	7	8	10	12	13	14	14	12
Source 1: Instituto Nacional de Meteorologia
Source 2: Meteo Climat (record highs and lows)

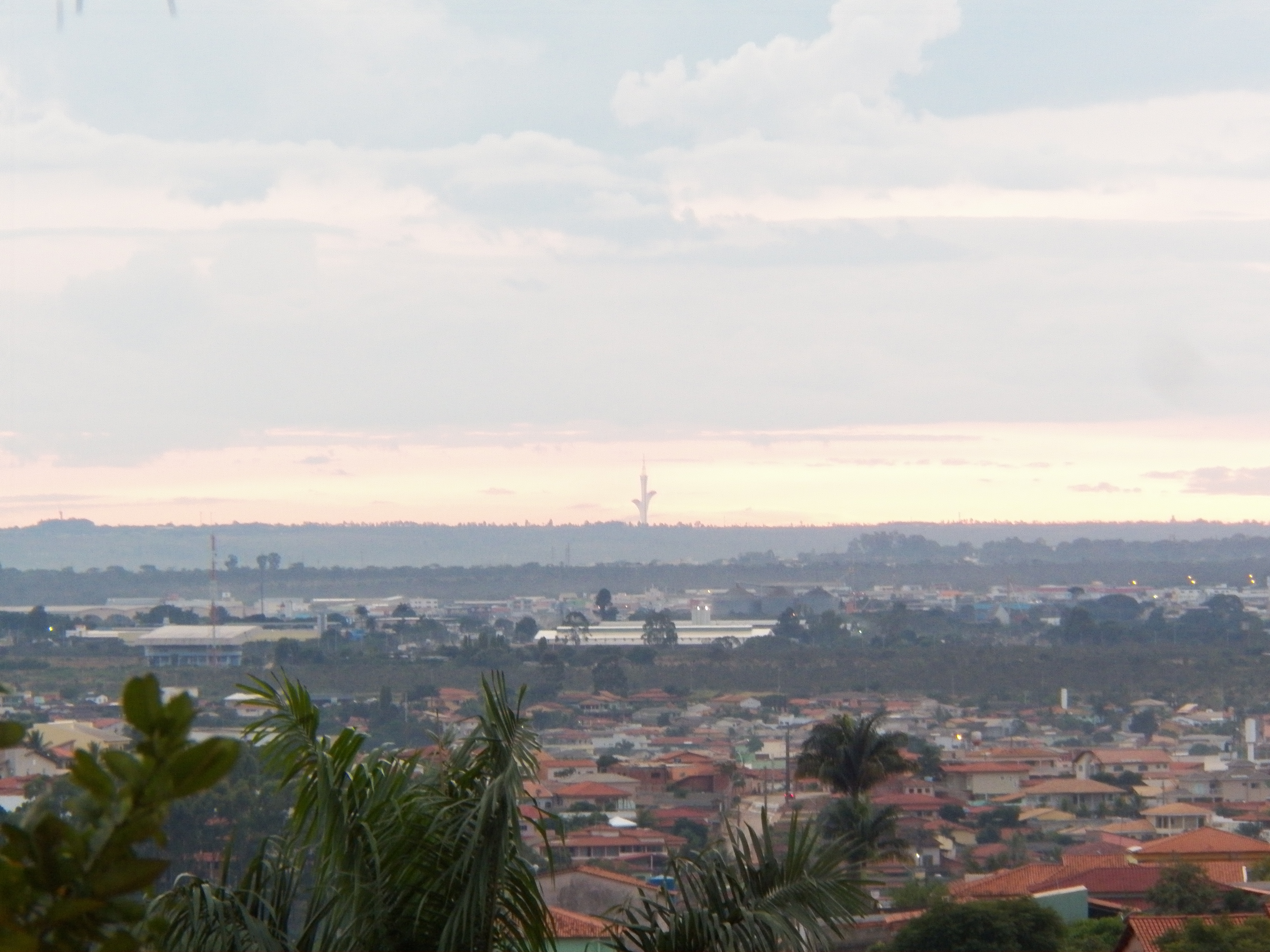
Vicente Pires skyline

== Government ==
The government of Vicente Pires is the Regional Administration. In a different fashion to municipalities, the Administrative Regions are administered by Regional Administrations, which are led by an administrator. Each administration is responsible for providing services to their respective regions, such as power, water, sanitation, and road infrastructure. The current administrator for Vicente Pires is Gilvando Galdino Fernandes.

== Infrastructure ==
Vicente Pires is served by a power grid, public lighting and asphalt paving, with projects for a water supply and sanitation system in the implementation phase. The region presents recurring problems regarding the maintenance of roads, being sensitive to flooding and easily deteriorating in periods with heavy rainfall. The lack of properly maintained roads has led to several craters being formed during rainy periods, which gave it the nickname "Buraco Pires". Vicente Pires is also an area with the possibility of natural disasters according to Brazil's Civil Police.

=== Transport ===
The main highways that give access to the administrative region are Estrada Parque Ceilândia – EPCL (DF-095), Estrada Parque Taguatinga – EPTG (DF-085) and Estrada Parque Vicente Pires – EPVP (DF-079). Vicente Pires does not have any rail transportation, instead its public transportation is based on bus lines, which are provided by the company Expresso São José.

== See also ==
- List of administrative regions of the Federal District
