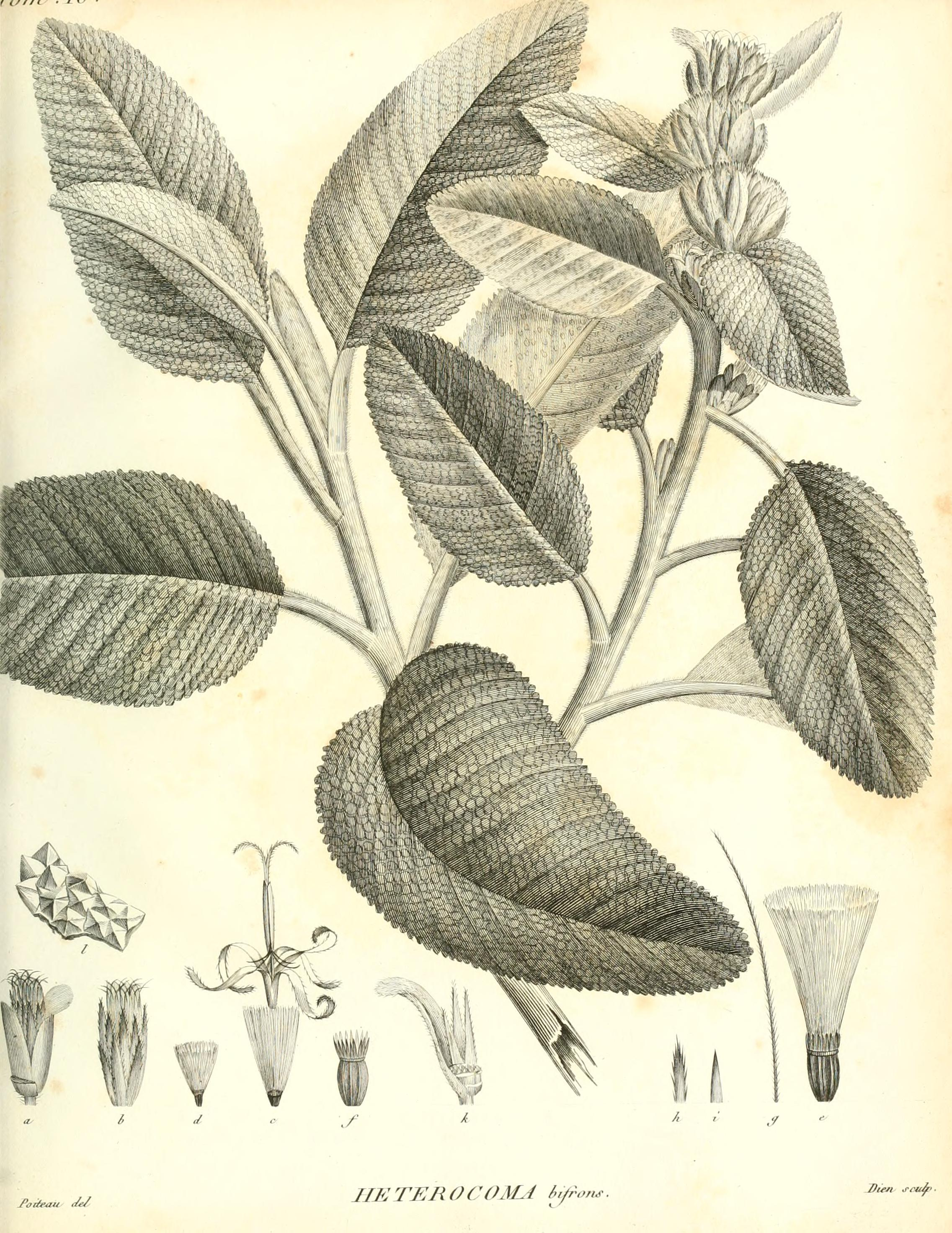
- 1810 botanical drawing of Heterocoma bifrons (now Chronopappus bifrons)

Scientific classification
- Kingdom: Plantae
- Clade: Tracheophytes
- Clade: Angiosperms
- Clade: Eudicots
- Clade: Asterids
- Order: Asterales
- Family: Asteraceae
- Genus: Chronopappus
- Species: C. bifrons

Binomial name
- Chronopappus bifrons (Pers.) DC.

Synonyms
- Heterocoma bifrons (Pers.) DC.; Serratula bifrons Pers.

= Chronopappus bifrons =

Species of plant

Chronopappus bifrons is a species of flowering plant in the family Asteraceae, native to southeast Brazil. It was first described by Christiaan Hendrik Persoon in 1807 as Serratula bifrons.
