= Sudoeste/Octogonal =

- Administrative region
- Região Administrativa de Sudoeste/Octogonal; Administrative Region of Sudoeste/Octogonal
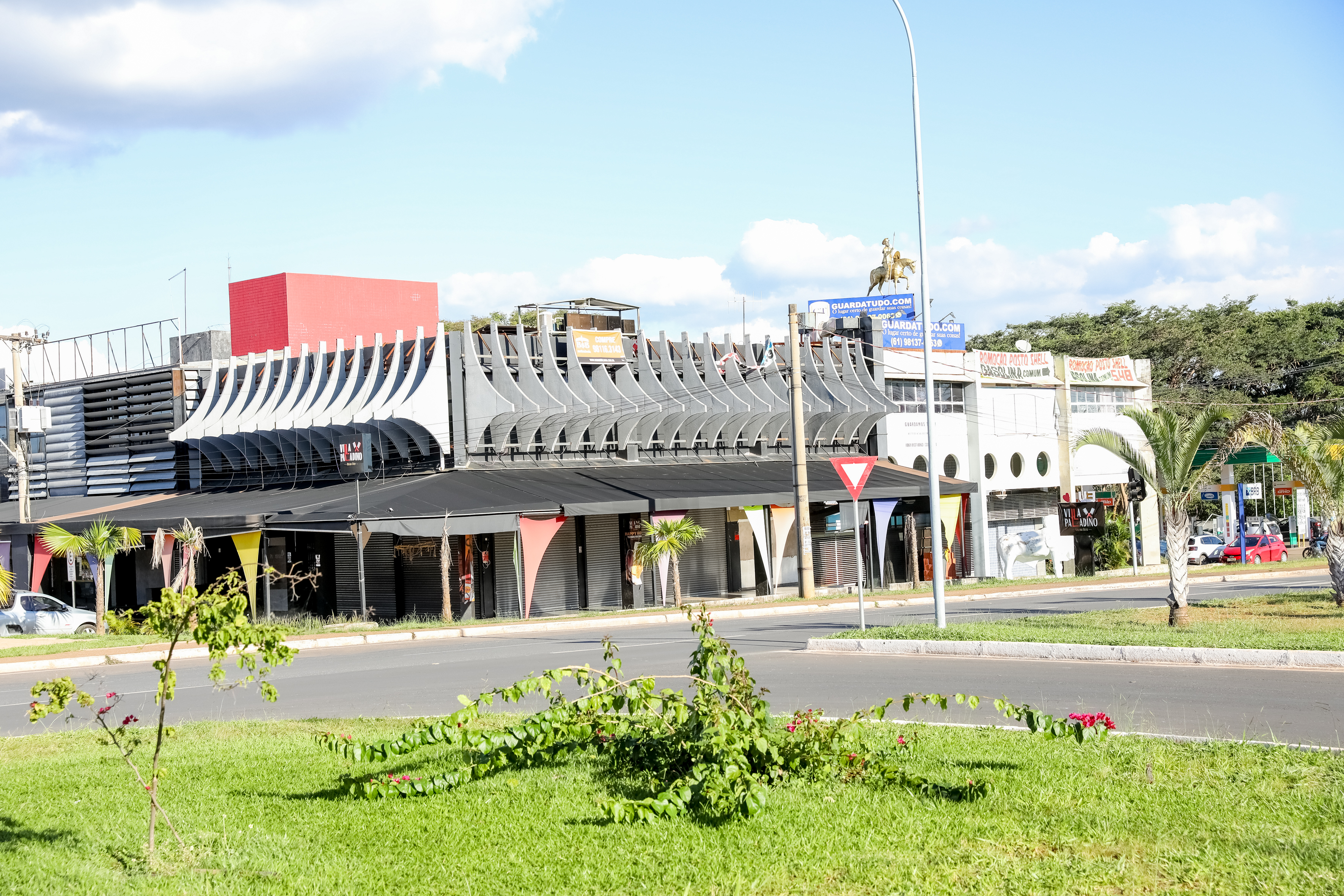
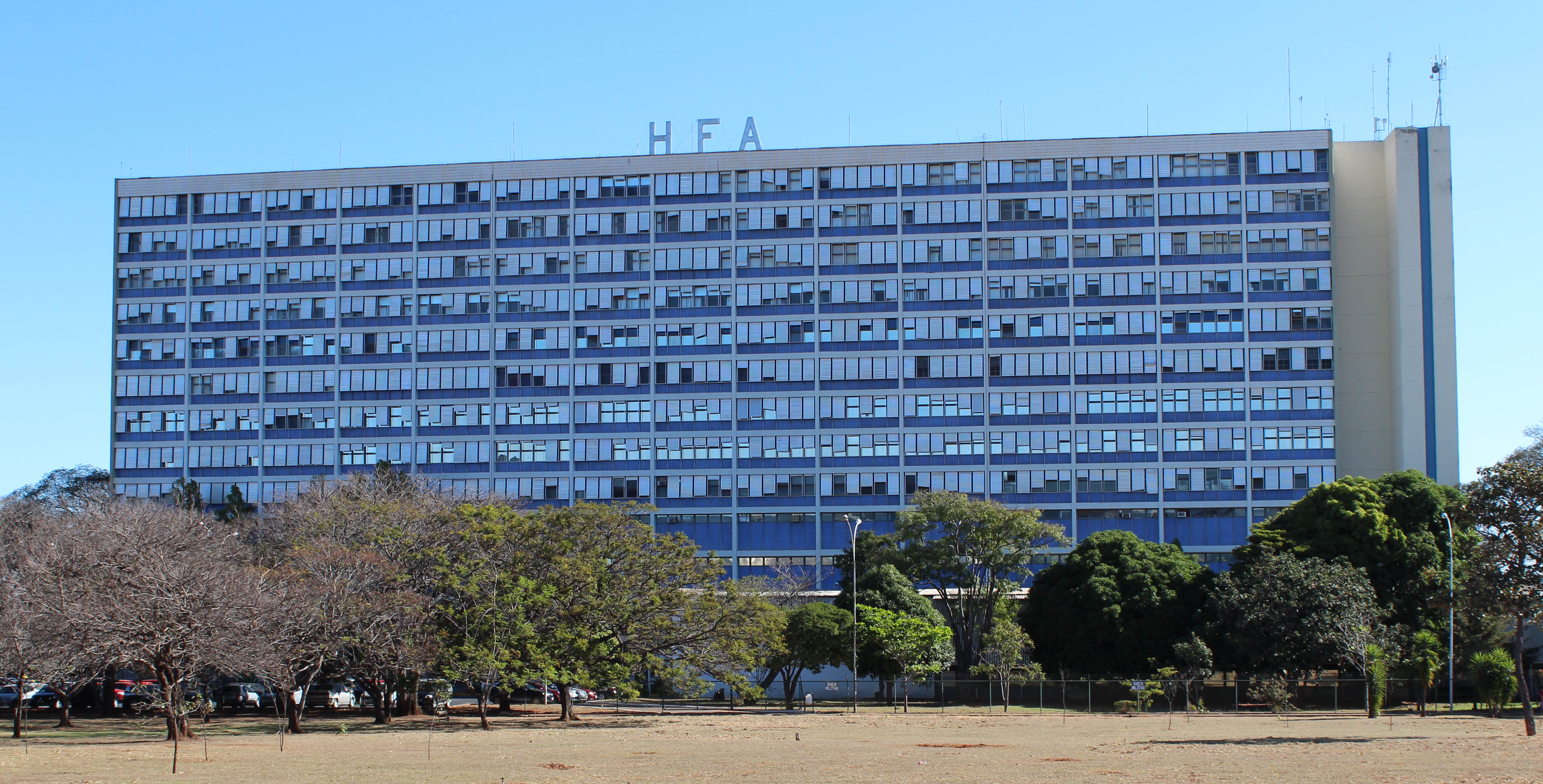
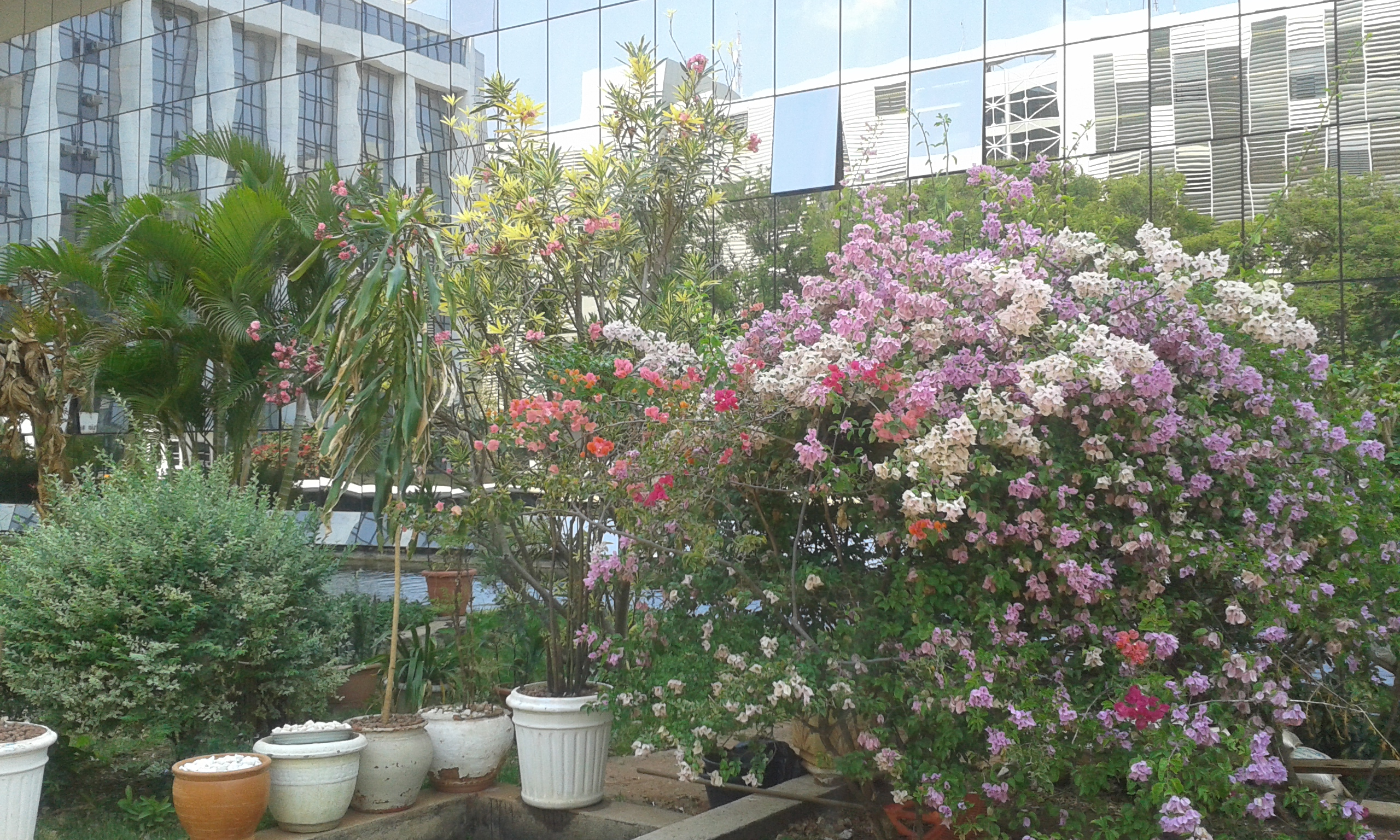
- Clockwise from top: Setor de Indústrias Gráficas; Hospital das Forças Armadas

- Location of Sudoeste/Octogonal in the Federal District
- Coordinates: 15°48′01″S 47°55′27″W
- Country: Brazil
- Region: Central-West
- State: Federal District
- Founded: July 10, 1989
- Time zone: UTC-3 (UTC-3)
  - Summer (DST): UTC-2 (UTC-2)
- Website: www.sudoeste.df.gov.br

Sudoeste/Octogonal is an administrative region in the Federal District in Brazil. It is largely surrounded by Brasília to the east, and bordered by SIA and Cruzeiro to the west. Sudoeste/Octogonal was founded on July 10, 1989, receiving the status of administrative region, according to Law 3153, of May 6, 2003.
