= Brazilian Highlands =

Geographic region

- Plateau
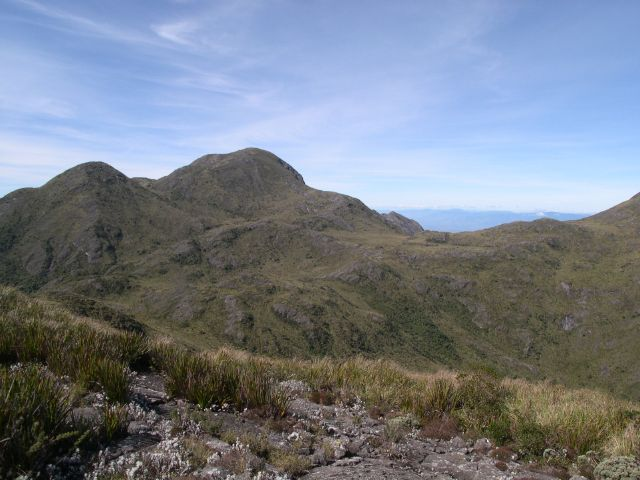
- Pedra da Mina, a mountain in the state of São Paulo, in 1997

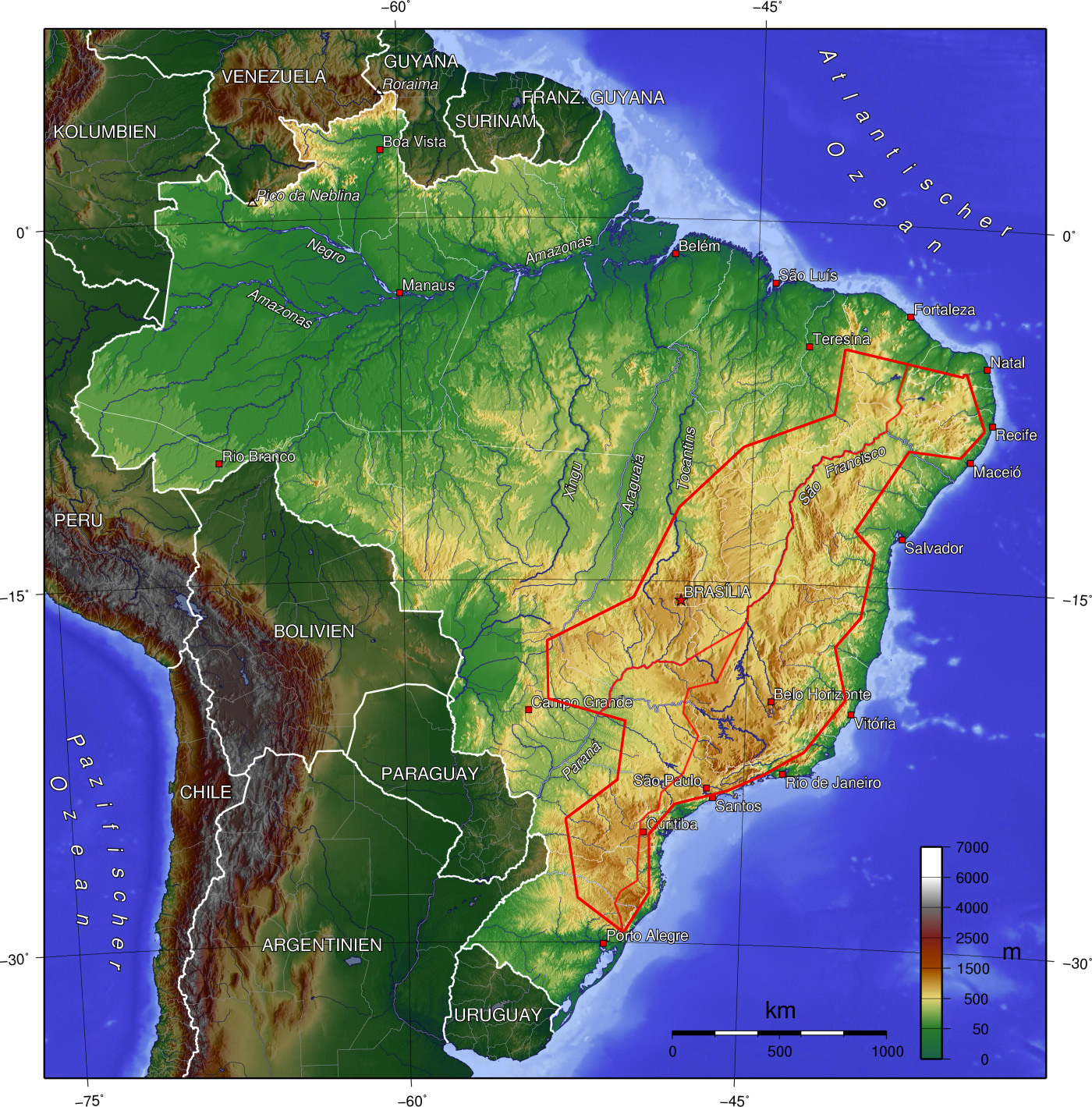
- Topographic map of Brazil. The Brazilian Highlands/Plateau is the large yellowish and brown area in the east, south and center of the country.
- Location: Caatinga and Cerrado, Brazil

Area
  - Total: 5,000,000 km^{2} (1,900,000 sq mi)

Dimensions
  - Length: 3,500 km (2,200 mi), SW x NE
- Highest elevation: 2,891 m (9,485 ft) (Pico da Bandeira)

The Brazilian Highlands or Brazilian Plateau (Portuguese: Planalto Brasileiro) is an extensive geographical region covering most of the eastern, southern and central portions of Brazil, in all some 4,500,000 km^{2} (1,930,511 sq mi) or approximately half of the country's land area. The vast majority of Brazil's population (203.062.512; 2022 census) lives in the highlands or on the narrow coastal region immediately adjacent to it.

Ancient basaltic lava flows gave birth to much of the region. However, the time of dramatic geophysical activity is long past, as there is now no seismic or volcanic activity. Erosion has also played a large part in shaping the Highlands, forming extensive sedimentary deposits and wearing down the mountains.

The Brazilian Highlands are recognized for its great diversity: within the region there are several different biomes, vastly different climatic conditions, many types of soil, and thousands of animal and plant species.

== Major divisions ==
Due to its size and diversity, the Brazilian Highlands is usually divided into three main areas:

- Atlantic Plateau extending all along the eastern coast of Brazil, and including several mountain ranges. It was once almost completely covered by the Atlantic Rainforest, one of the richest areas of biodiversity in the world, of which only 7.3% remains.
- Southern Plateau, advancing inland in the southern and southern-central portions of the country. Sedimentary rocks covered partially by basaltic lava spills form the fertile ground known as "purple land". Large portions of this region were also covered by the Atlantic Rainforest, while araucaria highland forest and cerrado grasslands take up much of the rest of the space.
- Central Plateau occupying the central portions of Brazil, with sedimentary and crystalline formations. Approximately 85% were once covered by cerrado vegetation, of which only a small portion remains intact.

In addition to the plateau regions, several adjoining or enclosed mountain ranges are considered to be part of the Brazilian Highlands. Some of the most important are (from north to south):

- Serra da Borborema
- Chapada Diamantina
- Serra do Espinhaço
- Serra do Caparaó
- Serra da Mantiqueira
- Serra do Mar
- Serra Geral

The highest point of the Brazilian Highlands is the Pico da Bandeira in the Serra do Caparaó, 2,891 meters (9,485 ft).

== See also ==
- Guiana Shield
- Serras de Sudeste
