= Park Way =

- Administrative region
- Região Administrativa de Park Way; Administrative Region of Park Way
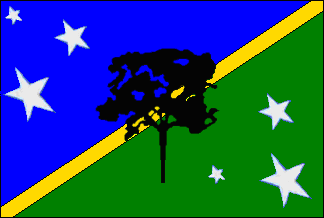
- Flag

- Location of Park Way in the Federal District
- Coordinates: 15°54′25″S 47°57′53″W
- Country: Brazil
- Region: Central-West
- State: Federal District
- Established: 13 March 1961

Government
  - Regional administrator: Abdon Luiz de Sousa de Barros

Area
  - Total: 76.47 km^{2} (29.53 sq mi)

Population
  - Total: 20,511
  - Density: 268.2/km^{2} (694.7/sq mi)
- Time zone: UTC−3 (BRT)
- Area code: +55 61
- Website: www.parkway.df.gov.br

Park Way is an administrative region in the Federal District in Brazil. It is located southwest of Paranoá Lake. Consisting of two separated portions, it is bordered clockwise by Águas Claras, Guará, Núcleo Bandeirante, and Arniqueira in its northern half; and Núcleo Bandeirante, Candangolândia, Lago Sul, Jardim Botânico, Santa Maria, Gama, Riacho Fundo and Riacho Fundo II in its southern half. Park Way was founded on 13 March 1961, receiving the status of administrative region, according to Law 3255, of 29 December 2003.

== See also ==
- List of administrative regions of the Federal District
