= Botanical Garden of Brasília =

Botanical garden in Brasília, Brazil

- Jardim Botânico de Brasília
- Interactive map of Botanical Garden of Brasília
- Type: Botanical Garden
- Location: Brasília, Federal District, Brazil
- Coordinates: 15°52′28″S 47°50′09″W
- Operator: Secretariat of Environment of the Federal District

The Botanical Garden of Brasília (Portuguese: Jardim Botânico de Brasília (JBB)) is a botanical garden in Brazil, located in the administrative region of Jardim Botânico, of the Federal District, located on the banks of Highway DF 035. It is open Tuesday to Sunday, from 9 am to 5 pm.

It was founded on March 8, 1985, although its location had already been planned since the construction of Brasília.

== Structures ==
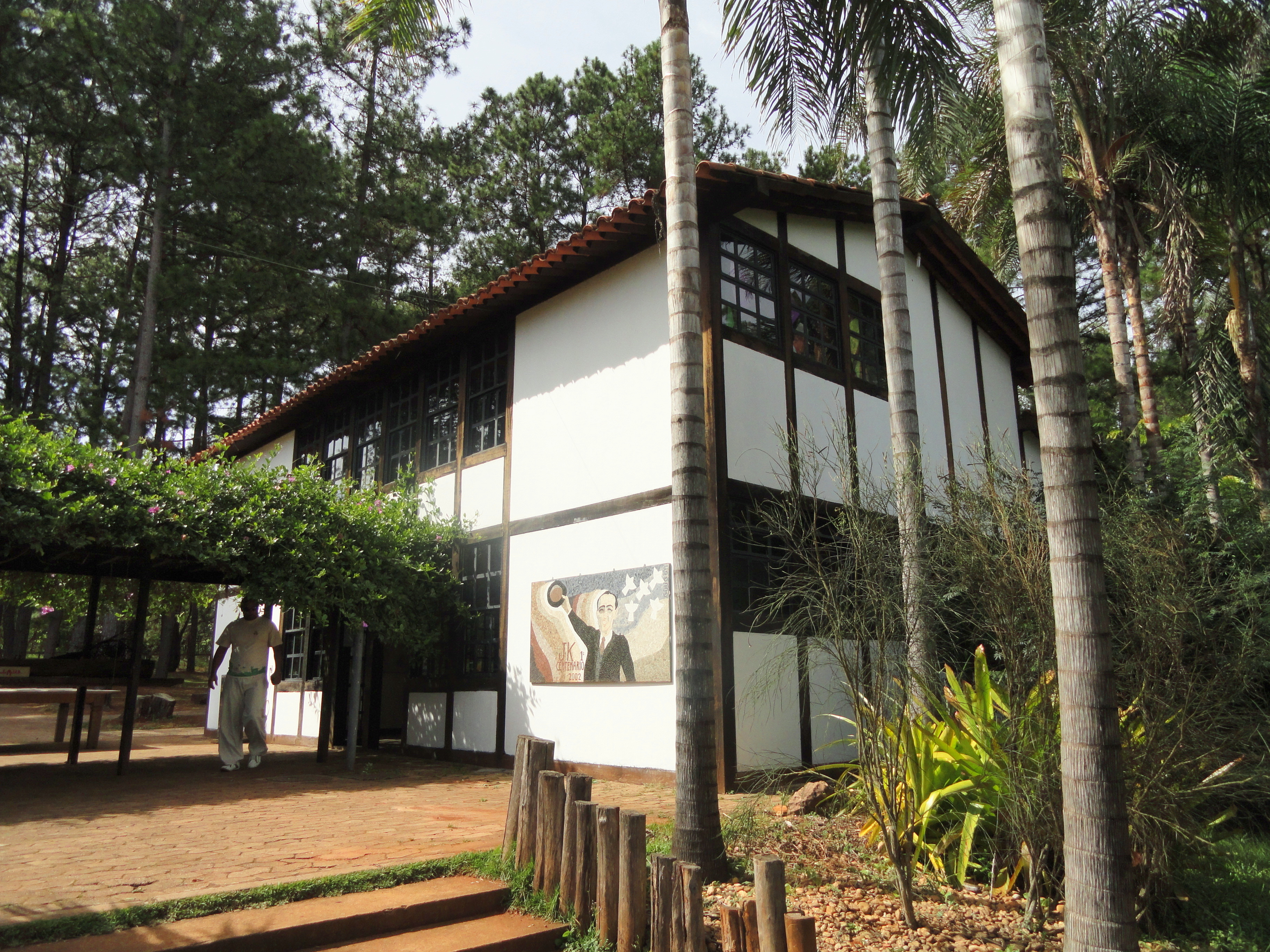
Visitor Center

=== Ampitheater ===
The ampitheater is located next to the Avenue of Nations and States and is geared towards large events. Eucalyptus and pine forestry experiments are located at the back of the site.

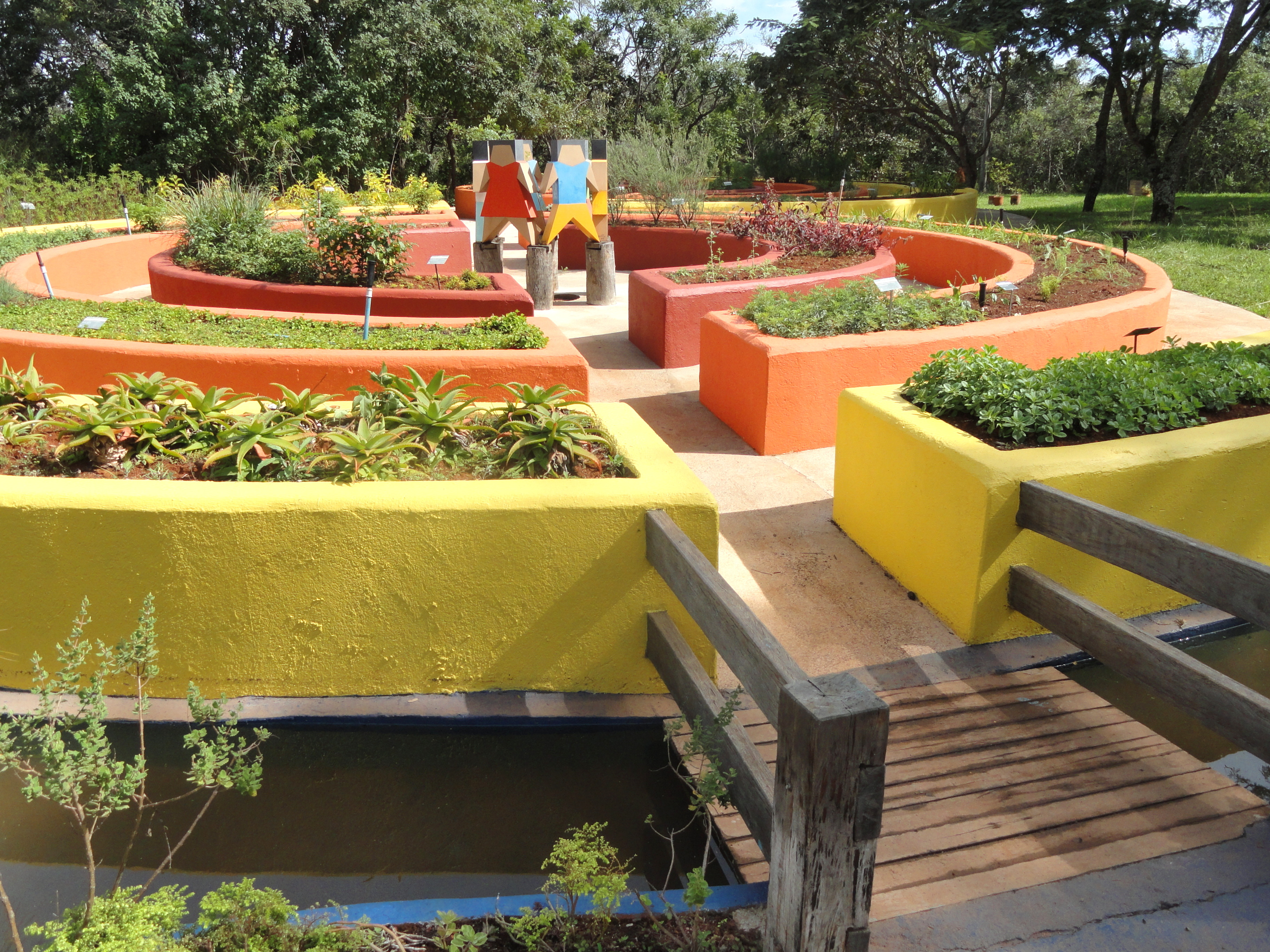
Sensory Garden

=== Permaculture House and Scented Garden ===
At the Permaculture House, used by educators to host meetings and art exhibitions, visitors can observe plants and their cyclical and evolutionary systems. There is also an agroforestry garden and a rainwater harvesting unit.

=== Garden Evolution ===
In a circular area of approximately 3 hectares, it presents the evolution of plants according to their reproductive system based on the Phylogenetic Model of the botanist George Ledyard Stebbins, being quite didactic, with the most evolved plants on the edges and the least evolved in the center.

== Publications ==
The Brasília Botanical Garden has published the scientific journal Heringeriana biannually since 1994, featuring original scientific articles, taxonomic monographs, annotated checklists, scientific notes, and opinions in various areas of biodiversity.
