= Federal Institute of Brasília =

Coordinates: 15.7546°S 47.8798°W

Federal Institute of Education, Science and Technology of Brasília
- Instituto Federal de Educação, Ciência e Tecnologia de Brasília
- Other names: IFB
- Type: Public university
- Established: December 29, 2008
- Rector: Luciana Miyoko Massukado
- Location: Brasília, DF, Brazil
- Campus: Urban, 3,950,579 m^{2} (42,523,680 sq ft)
- Website: ifb.edu.br

The Federal Institute of Brasília (Brazilian Portuguese: Instituto Federal de Brasília, IFB), or in full: Federal Institute of Education, Science and Technology of Brasília (Brazilian Portuguese: Instituto Federal de Educação, Ciência e Tecnologia de Brasília) is an Institute of Technology located at the capital of Brazil that offers different types of degrees and operating often at variable levels of the educational system. It is an institution of Higher education and professional vocational education, specializing in science, engineering, and technology or different sorts of technical subjects. It is also a secondary education school focused on vocational training and applied Scientific research.

IFB has the objective of forming ethical citizens and professionals and of being an institution involved with society. Its actions point toward the development of new technologies, cultural and social investments and the formation of critical citizens. The student's abilities are improved and testes through the courses, helping them to develop the "know-how", and values concerning all the areas.

The Federal Institute of Brasilia currently has ten campuses: Brasilia, Ceilândia, Estrutural, Gama, Planaltina, Recanto das Emas, Riacho Fundo, Samambaia, São Sebastião and Taguatinga. Of these, only the Planaltina Campus is located in a rural area.

== History ==
The IFB is public and federal Institute of Technology created on December 29, 2008, by federal law no. 11.892, which also created the Rede Federal de Educação Profissional, Científica e Tecnológica, a network of technological institutes covering all states of Brazil and directly vinculated to the Ministry of Education of Brazil (MEC).

When it was created, IFB had only one campus in the rural area of Planaltina, former known as Escola Técnica Federal de Brasília. Nowadays, it is a multicampus institution, based on the north-wing (Portuguese: Asa Norte) of Brasília, with other nine campuses at different administrative regions of the Federal District (Brazil): Ceilândia, Estrutural, Gama, Riacho Fundo, Samambaia, São Sebastião, Taguatinga, Taguatinga Centro, and Planaltina. The former is the only campus situated in a rural area.

== Campuses ==
IFB currently has ten campuses, those being:

- Brasília
- Ceilandia
- Estrutural
- Gama
- Planaltina
- Recanto das Emas
- Riacho Fundo
- Samambaia
- São Sebastião
- Taguatinga

== See also ==
- São Paulo Federal Institute of Education, Science and Technology
- Rio de Janeiro Federal Institute of Education, Science and Technology
- University of Brasília
- Universities and Higher Education in Brazil
