= Sobradinho, Federal District =

Sobradinho
- Administrative region
- Região Administrativa de Sobradinho; Administrative Region of Sobradinho
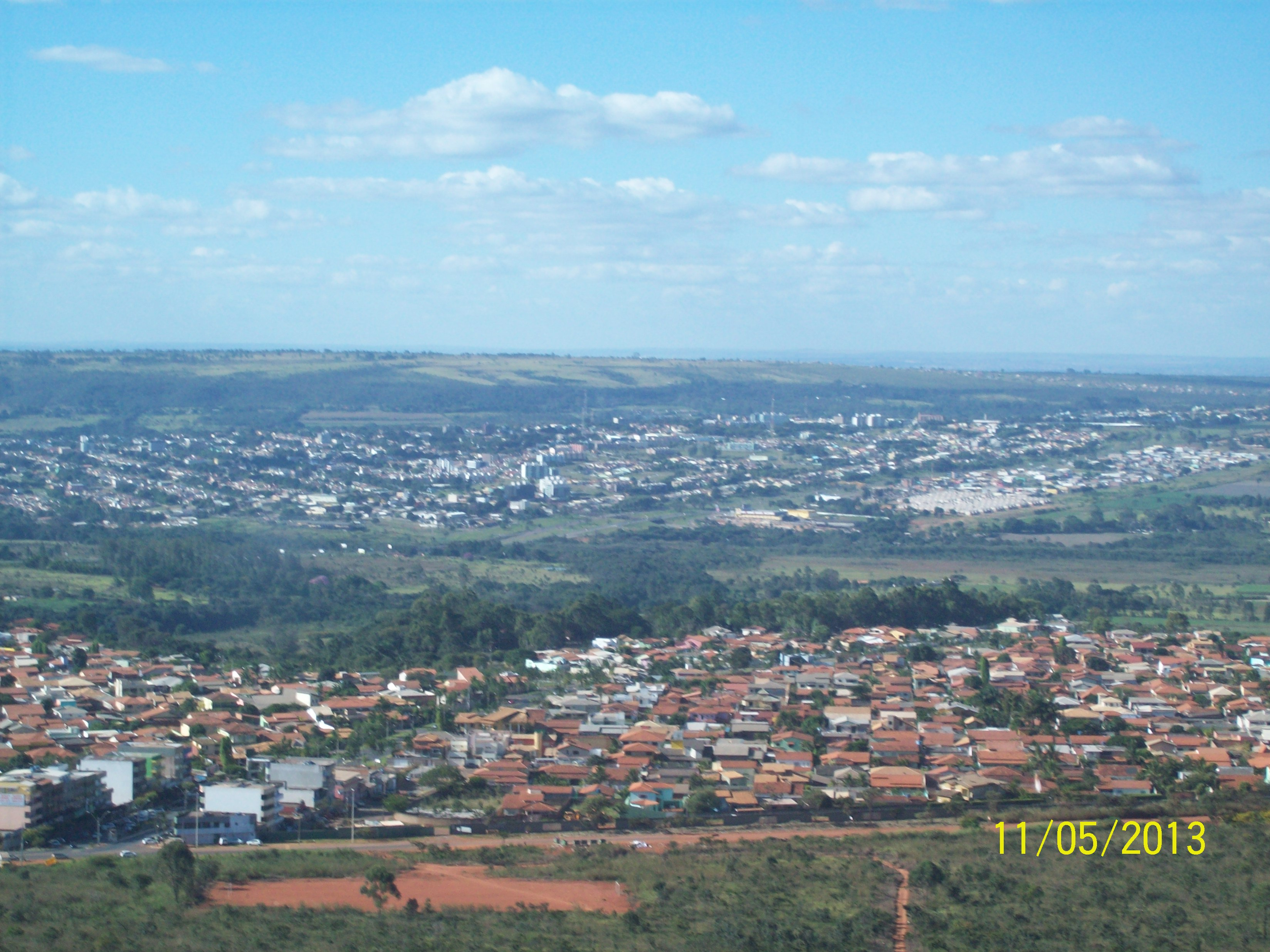
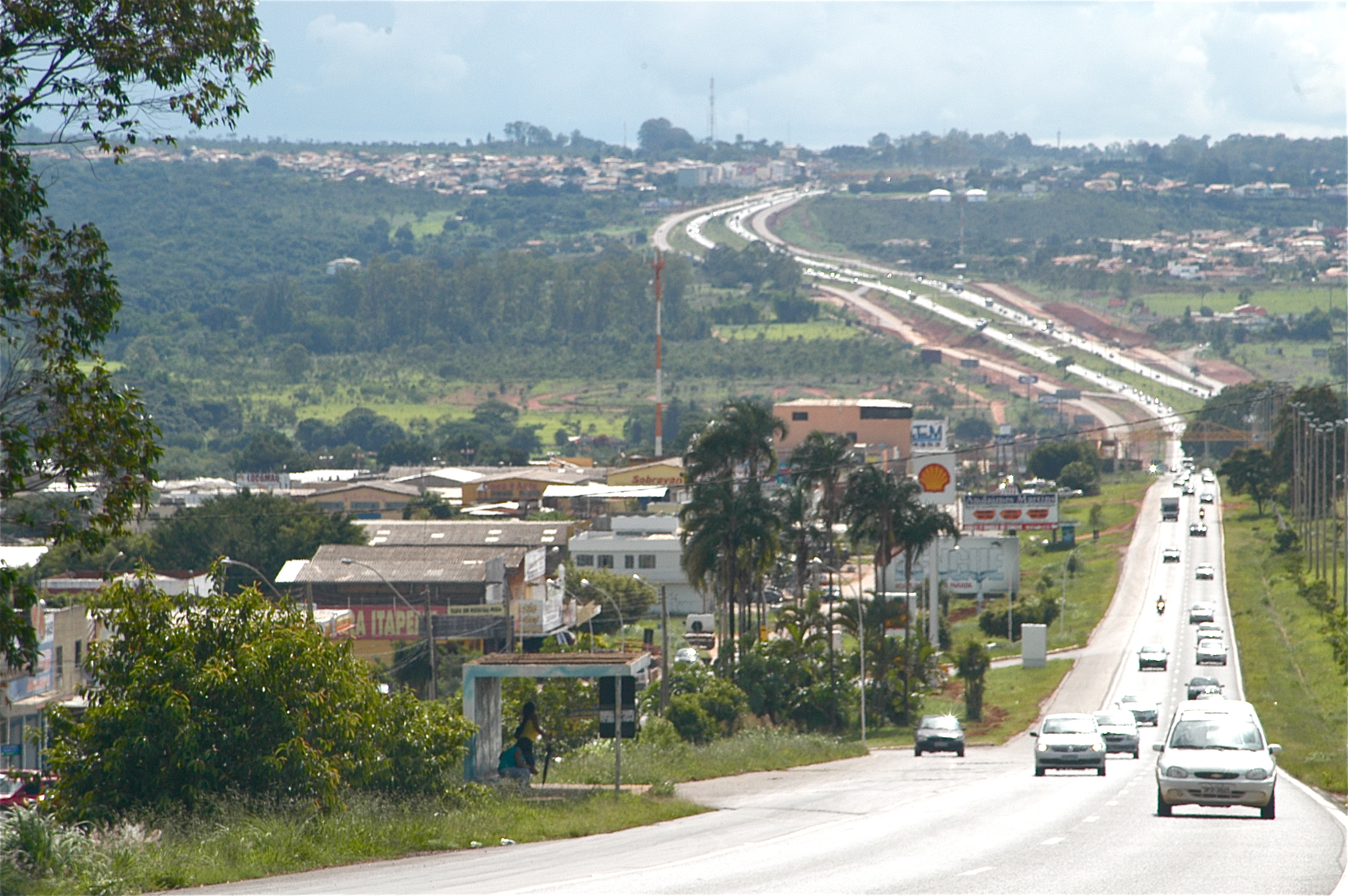

- Flag

- Location of Sobradinho in Federal District

- Location of Sobradinho in Brazil
- Coordinates: 15°39′11″S 47°47′29″W
- Country: Brazil
- Region: Central-West
- State: Federal District
- Founded: May 13, 1960

Government
  - Regional administrator: Valter Soares Leite

Area
  - Total: 28,760 km^{2} (11,100 sq mi)
- Elevation: 1,000 m (3,300 ft)

Population (2010)
  - Total: 85,491
  - Density: 3/km^{2} (7.8/sq mi)
- Demonym: Sobradinhense
- Time zone: UTC-3 (UTC-3)
  - Summer (DST): UTC-2 (UTC-2)
- Postal Code (CEP): 73000-000
- Area code: +55 61
- Website: www.sobradinho.df.gov.br

Sobradinho is an administrative region in the Federal District in Brazil. It is bordered by Fercal to the north, Planaltina to the east, Itapoã to the south, and Lago Norte and Sobradinho II to the west.

== History ==
Sobradinho began with a ranch of that name belonging to the municipality of Formosa, Goiás. According to popular history the name came from the existence of an old cross built long before 1850 along the banks of a stream near the ranch. On one of the arms of the cross were two little nests of a bird called joão de barro (Rufous hornero – Furnarius rufus), one on top of the other, forming a little two-story house—a sobradinho in Portuguese. This phenomenon attracted the attention of passersby who took it as a reference point with the name Cross of Sobradinho or Sobradinho of the Cross. As time went by the local stream was called Sobradinho Stream.

Because of the need to house the migrant families from the Northeast, Goiás, Bahia and other states, Sobradinho was created along the old highway that linked the city of Planaltina, Goiás and the Federal Capital being built (1959). Today that old highway is a four-lane motorway and residents of Sobradinho can be in Brasília in a few minutes time. Sobradinho was founded on May 13, 1960, receiving the status of administrative region, according to Law 4545, of December 10, 1964.

Sobradinho has a population of 85,491 as of 2010.

== Etymology ==
The name comes from a style of building called Sobrado, according to the oldest residents, on the farm that originated the region there was a house of joão-de-barro, a bird known for making its nest out of clay. But this one was built as if it were a townhouse (in Portuguese: Sobrado), with two floors, hence the name.

== See also ==
- List of administrative regions of the Federal District
