= Sol Nascente/Pôr do Sol =

- Administrative region
- Região Administrativa de Sol Nascente/Pôr do Sol; Administrative Region of Sol Nascente/Pôr do Sol
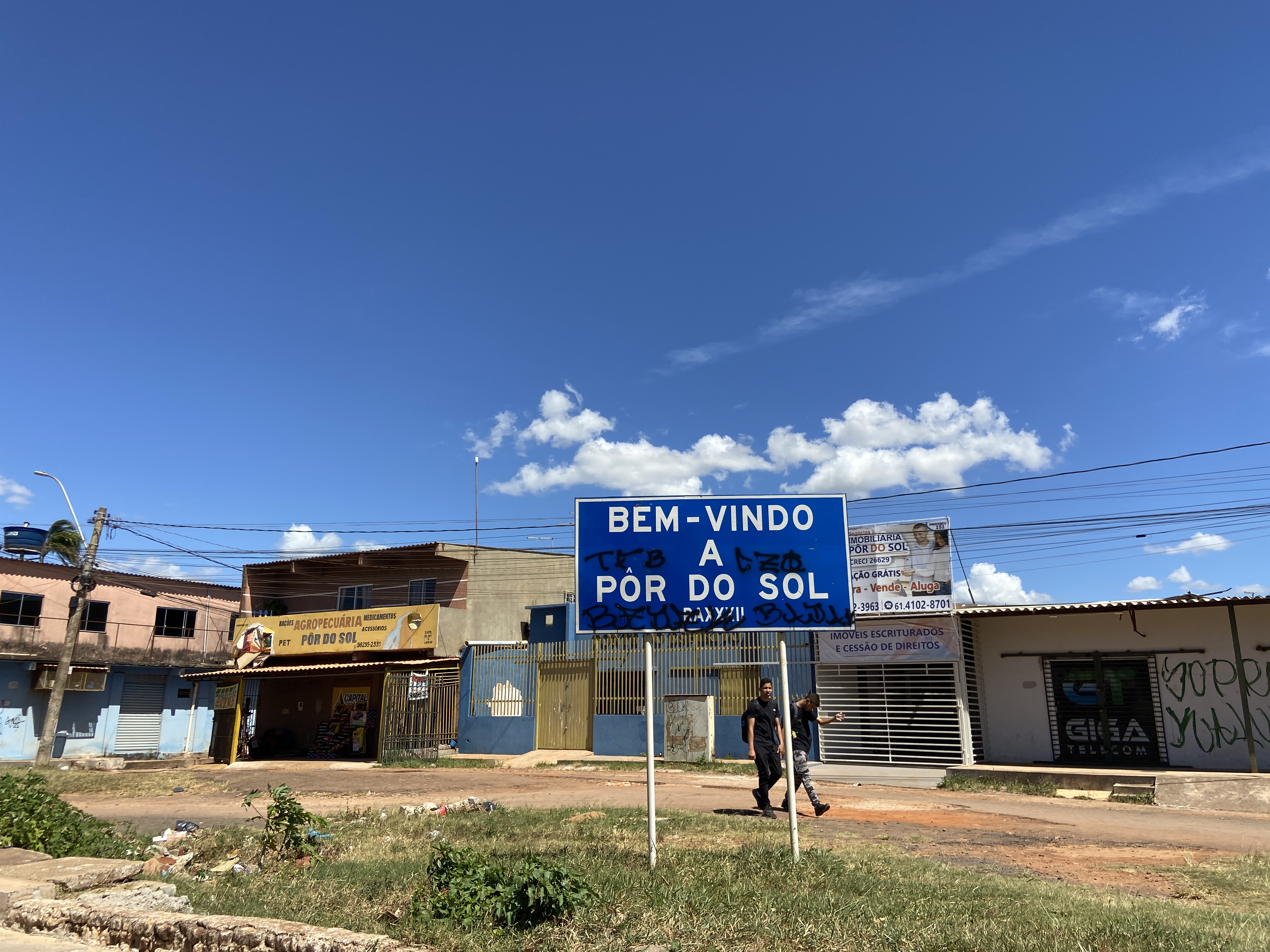

- Location of Sol Nascente/Pôr do Sol in the Federal District
- Country: Brazil
- Region: Central-West
- State: Federal District
- Founded: August 14, 1999

Population (2018)
  - Total: 83,102
- Time zone: UTC-3 (BRT)
  - Summer (DST): UTC-2 (BRST)
- Area code: +55 61
- Website: www.solnascente.df.gov.br

Sol Nascente/Pôr do Sol is an administrative region in the Federal District in Brazil. For 20 years, Sol Nascente/Pôr do Sol was part of the administrative region of Ceilândia, until it was separated from the latter in 2019. It is composed of two distinct housing sectors (Sol Nascente and Pôr do Sol), whose urban spots do not touch, but are conurbated with Ceilândia.

== History ==
Sol Nascente/Pôr do Sol was a rural area until the beginning of the 1990s, being part of Setor P.Sul and Setor P.Norte, the name Sol Nascente refers to two situations where there was a Japanese farm and thus referred to the land of the Rising Sun, and also back in 1976 in Ceilandia, the capoeira group Sol Nascente by Mestre Romeu appeared, which operated in the 90s on the C 40 of P.Norte next to VC 311 stretch 2 of what is now Sol Nascente, when the fractionation began to occur land, a situation that intensified in the following decade, which caused the disorderly growth of the place, which for many years lived with minimal infrastructure conditions. Only in 2008 were the two major sectors that currently make up the region, Sol Nascente and Pôr do Sol, recognized as housing extensions in Ceilândia.

In 2010, when the region had more than 78 thousand inhabitants, the place could already be considered one of the largest irregular occupations in the country, surpassing the community of Rocinha in number of inhabitants. Two years earlier, through the sanction of Complementary Law No. 785, the regions were transformed into Social Interest Regularization Areas, and measures aimed at improving infrastructure for future regularization have been taken since then. Currently some stretches of the region are already regularized, and most of the others are in the process of regularization. Sol Nascente/Pôr do Sol was founded on August 14, 1999, receiving the status of administrative region, according to Law 6359, of August 14, 2019.

== Education ==
Sol Nascente/Pôr do Sol will receive a new Federal Institute of Brasília campus.

== See also ==
- List of administrative regions of the Federal District
