= Taguatinga, Federal District =

Taguatinga
- Administrative region
- Região Administrativa de Taguatinga; Administrative Region of Taguatinga
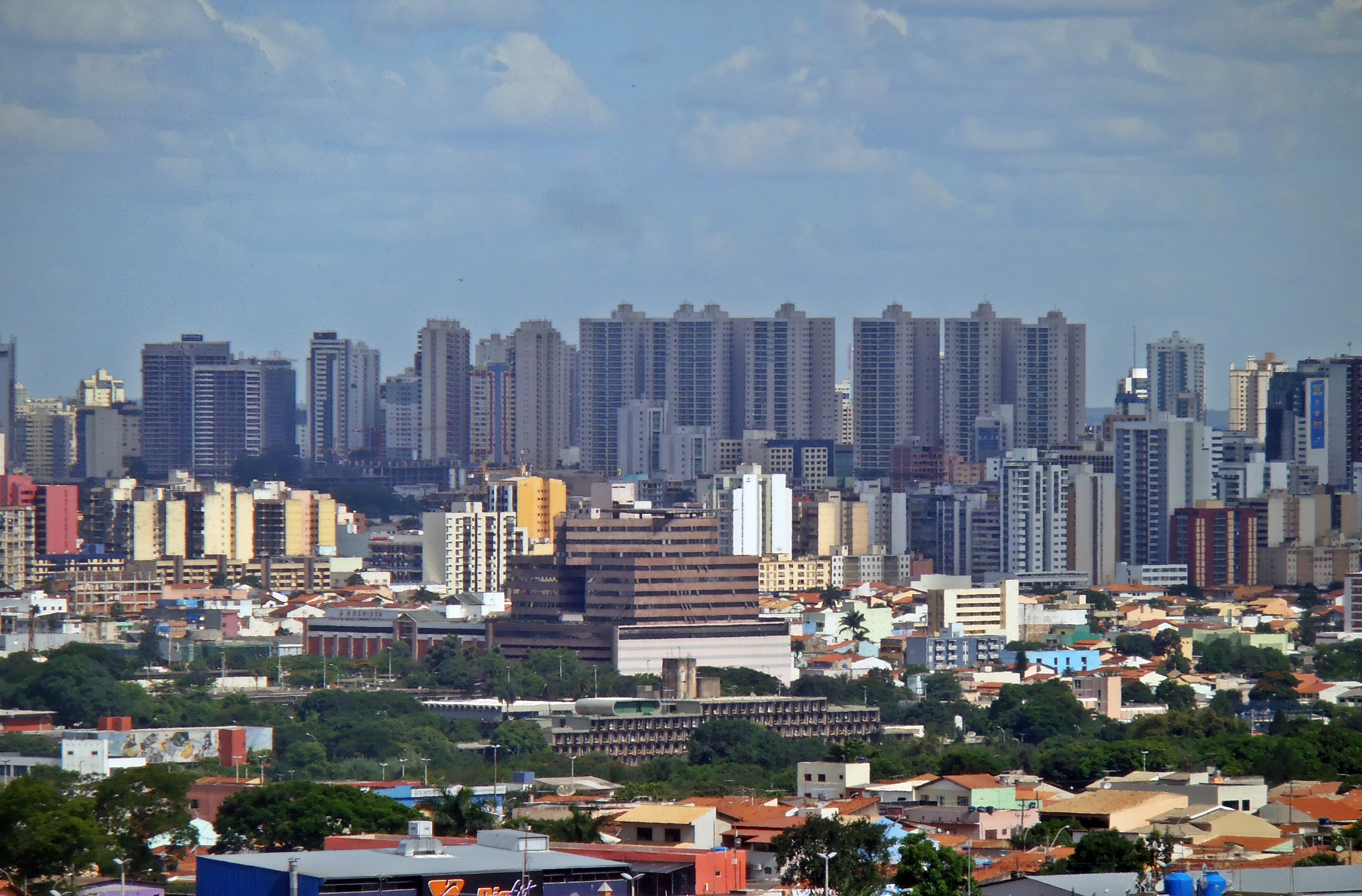
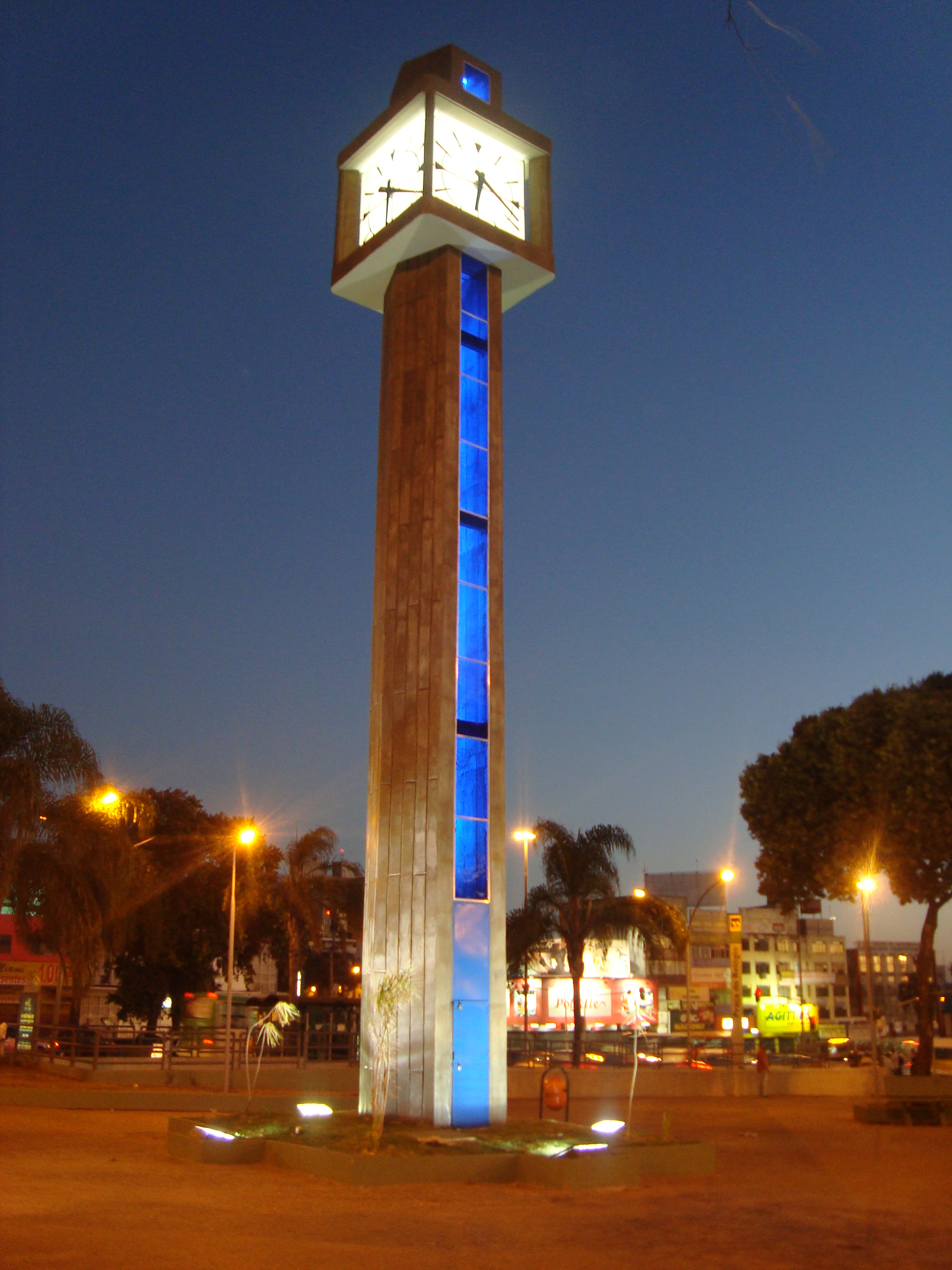
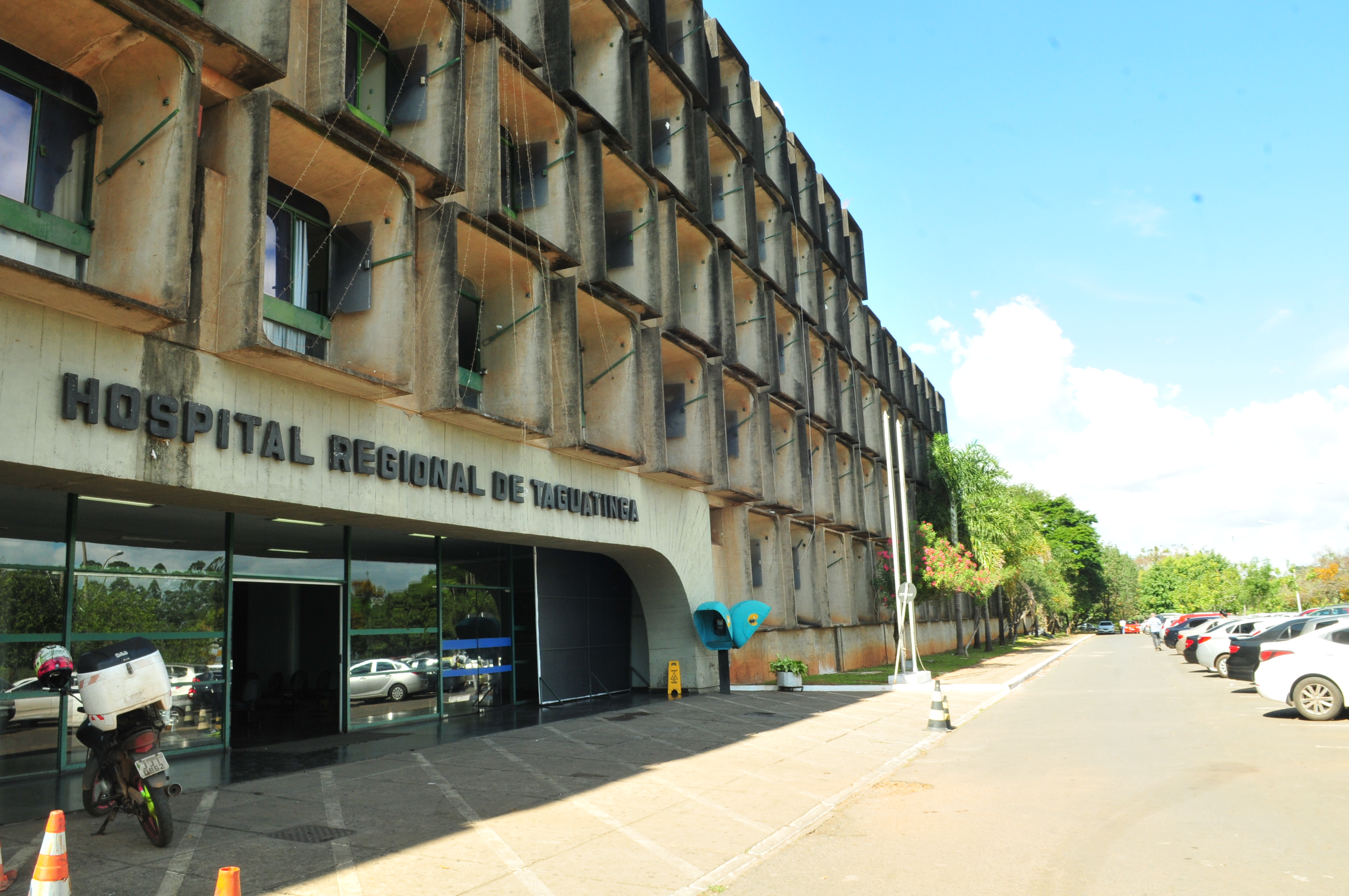
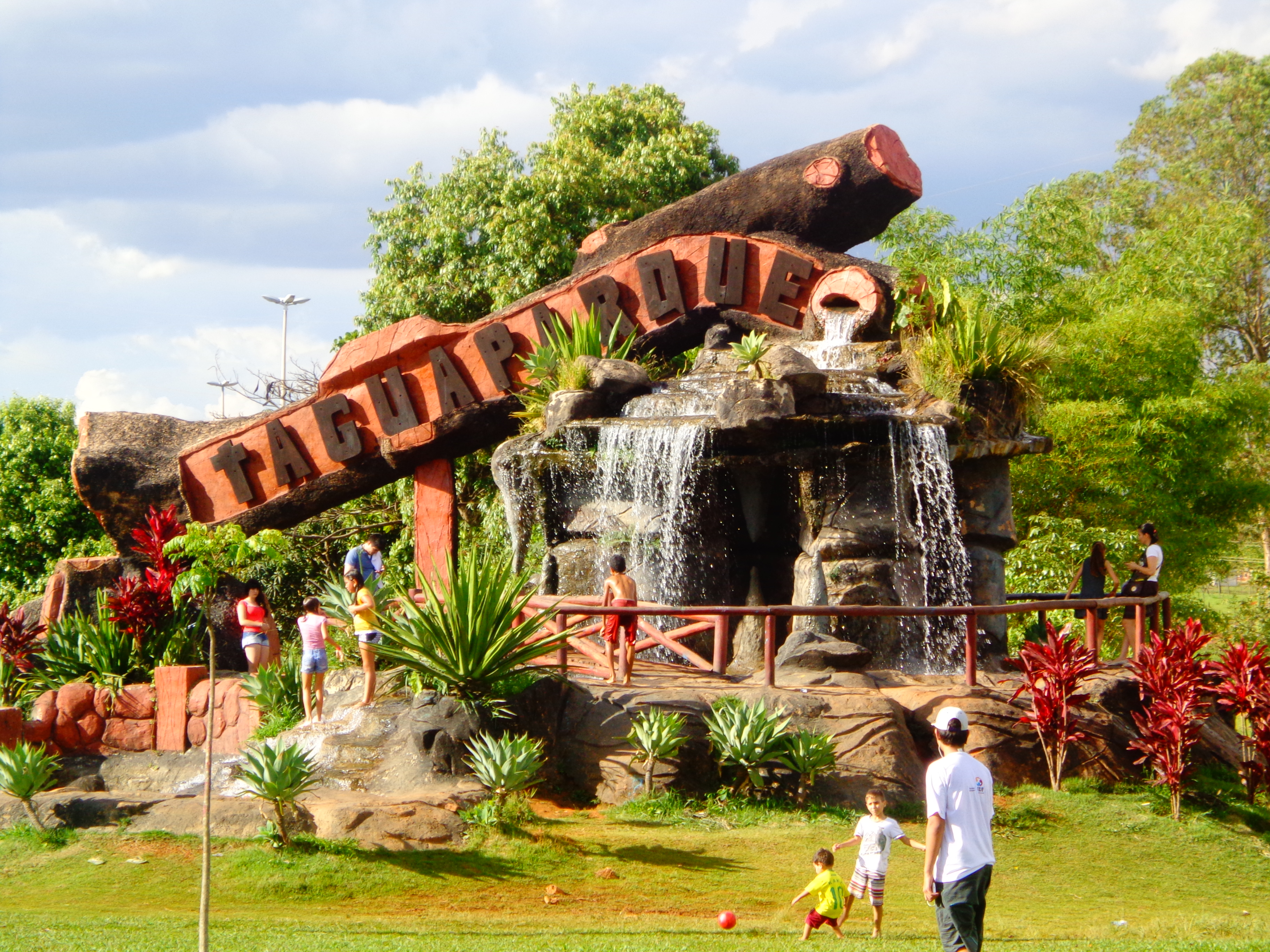
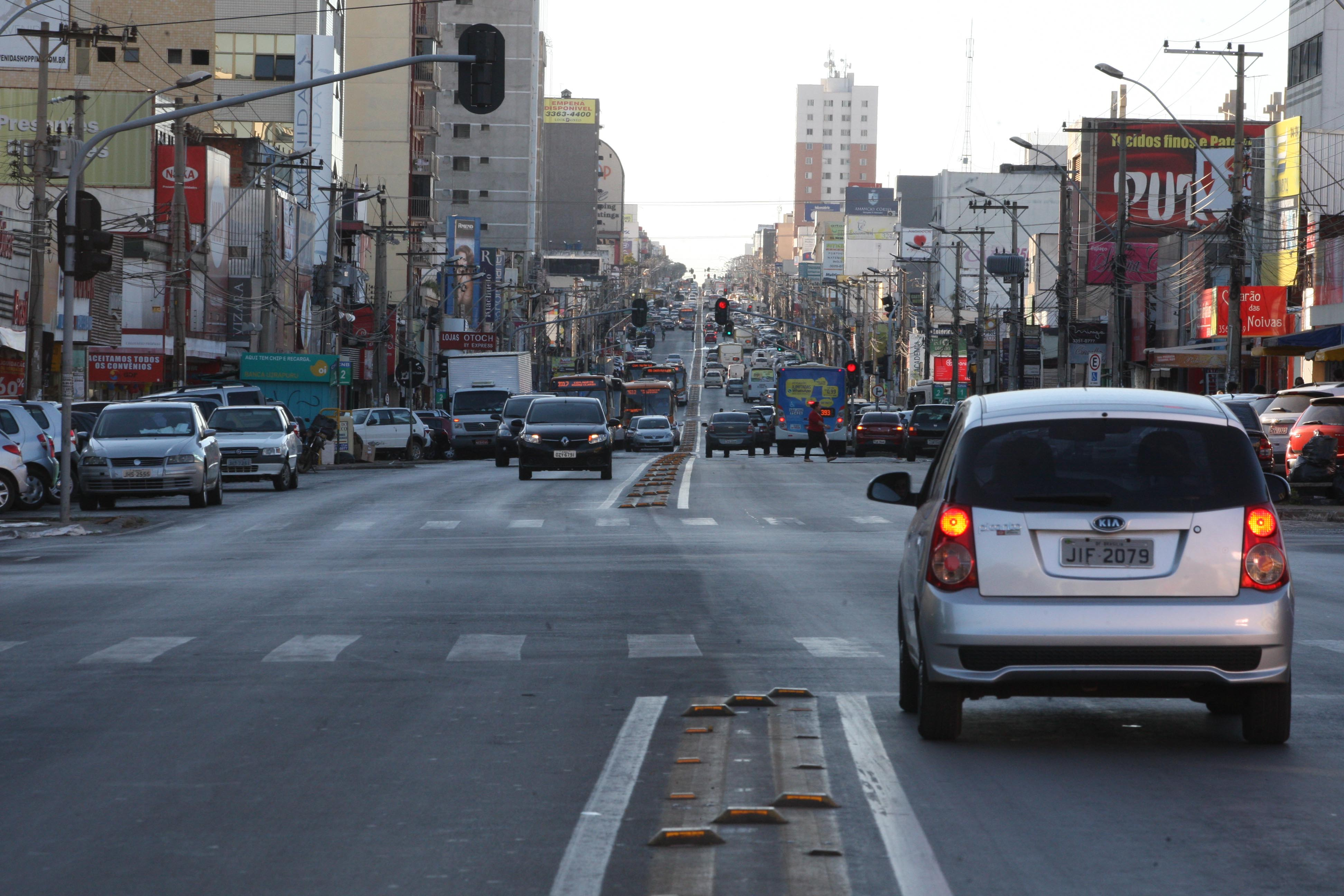
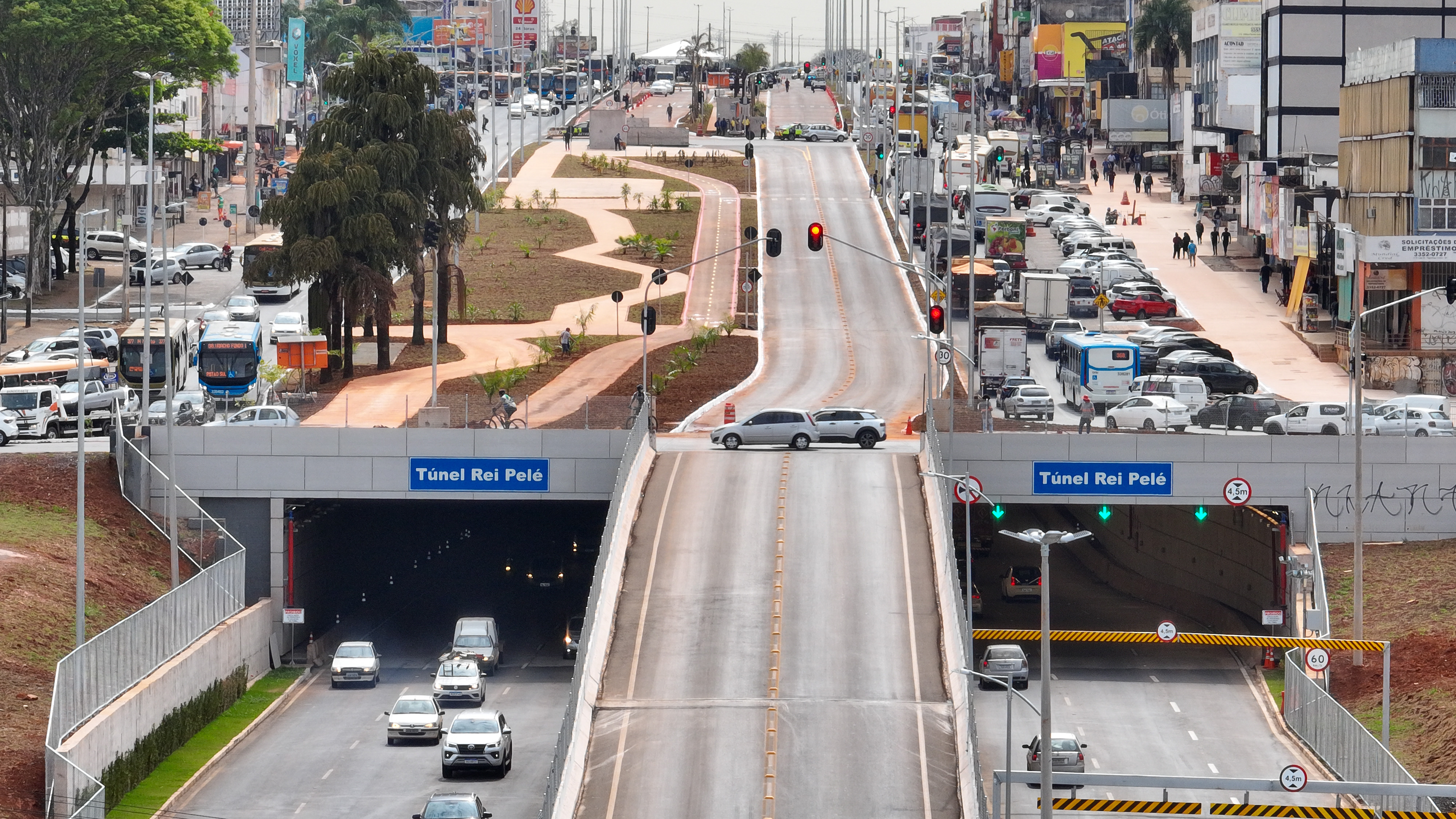
- Clockwise from top: Skyline, Taguatinga Regional Hospital, Commercial road, King Pelé Tunnel, Taguaparque, Praça do Relógio

- Flag
- Nickname: Taguá City
- Location of Taguatinga in the Federal District

- Location of Taguatinga in Brazil
- Coordinates: 15°50′00″S 48°03′23″W
- Country: Brazil
- Region: Central-West
- State: Federal District
- Founded: June 5, 1958

Government
  - Regional administrator: Karolyne Guimarães dos Santos

Area
  - Total: 121.34 km^{2} (46.85 sq mi)
- Elevation: 1,000 m (3,300 ft)

Population (2010)
  - Total: 221,909
  - Density: 1,828.8/km^{2} (4,737/sq mi)
- Demonym: Taguatinguense
- Time zone: UTC−3 (BRT)
- Postal Code (CEP): 72000-000
- Area code: +55 61
- Website: www.taguatinga.df.gov.br

Taguatinga is an administrative region in the Federal District in Brazil. It is bordered by Brasília to the north, Vicente Pires, Águas Claras, and Arniqueira to the east, Riacho Fundo and Riacho Fundo II to the south, Samambaia to the southwest, Ceilândia to the west, and Brazlândia to the northwest. Taguatinga has a population of 222,598, being the fourth largest administrative region by population.

== History ==
By around 1749, near the Córrego Cortado, a small settlement appeared, formed by pioneers and drovers who sought to establish allotments in the Captaincy of Goiás. This was the first arrival of Europeans in the land of the future city of Taguatinga, previously occupied by indigenous speakers of macro-Jê languages, which includes the Acroá, the Xakriabá, the Xavante, the Kayapo, and the Javaé. Some of these settlers were excited by the possibility of gold and diamonds nearby. On the banks of the same stream was installed the farmhouse Taguatinga, owned by Gabriel da Cruz Miranda. In 1781, the farm Taguatinga was sold to Antonio Couto de Abreu, son of the Bandeirante and Urban Couto e Menezes.

The consolidation of the city took place much later, almost two centuries after this period, mainly generated by large populations attracted by the construction of Brasília.

Taguatinga was founded on June 5, 1958, receiving the status of administrative region, according to Law 4545, of December 10, 1964. Initially, the city was called "Villa Sarah Kubitschek" but then its name was changed to "Santa Cruz de Taguatinga", leaving only "Taguatinga". Often it is called by locals simply of "Taguá".

A few months after the first residents have moved to Taguatinga, already worked in local schools; hospitals; shops, etc.

Taguatinga has developed especially in function of commerce and jobs that its population obtained. It became an important commercial center in the Federal District and pole of attraction for the population of nearby cities, harboring large shopping centers. Taguatinga today is one of the richest regions of the Federal District, today being is considered the economic capital of the Federal District.

Some cities that were formerly part of the administrative region of Taguatinga are: Ceilândia, Samambaia, Águas Claras and Vicente Pires.

The patron saint is Our Lady of Perpetual Help, which lithurgic celebration happens at June 27.

== Etymology ==
The suffix "-tinga" means "white" in Tupi. The prefix "ta'wa-", on the other hand, is quite controversial.

At first, "ta'wa" was translated as "bird", and "ta'wa'tinga" would mean "white bird". The Centro de Ensino Médio Ave Branca (CEMAB) has this name for this reason, and also for this reason a bird is part of the Taguatinga Flag, which was inspired by the poem Ta'Wa'Tiga by Antonio Garcia Muralha. Indeed, the scott hawk - predominantly white - is very common in the region, although there is no record of the animal being known as "Taguatinga".

But Taguá, a kind of yellowish or red clay, comes from the Tupi word "ta'wa" (which may also have originated the word "taba", indigenous house). Thus, "ta'wa" means "clay", and "ta'wa'tinga" would mean "white clay" a geological occurrence that is found in the region, especially near the Taguatinga Stream and the Cortado Stream.

== Geography ==
=== Climate ===
The climate of Taguatinga is tropical (Aw in the Köppen Classification), with a humid summer and a dry winter.

Climate data for Taguatinga
Month	Jan	Feb	Mar	Apr	May	Jun	Jul	Aug	Sep	Oct	Nov	Dec	Year
Mean daily maximum °C (°F)	26.1 (79.0)	26.4 (79.5)	26.2 (79.2)	25.8 (78.4)	25.2 (77.4)	24.8 (76.6)	25.9 (78.6)	27.4 (81.3)	27.5 (81.5)	26.4 (79.5)	25.8 (78.4)	26.1 (79.0)	26.1 (79.0)
Daily mean °C (°F)	21.3 (70.3)	21.5 (70.7)	21.2 (70.2)	20.4 (68.7)	19.2 (66.6)	18.5 (65.3)	19.5 (67.1)	20.9 (69.6)	21.9 (71.4)	21.5 (70.7)	21.2 (70.2)	21 (70)	20.7 (69.3)
Mean daily minimum °C (°F)	19.4 (66.9)	19.6 (67.3)	18.9 (66.0)	17.5 (63.5)	14.7 (58.5)	13.5 (56.3)	12.8 (55.0)	13.3 (55.9)	14.9 (58.8)	16.5 (61.7)	17.3 (63.1)	18.7 (65.7)	15.3 (59.5)
Average precipitation mm (inches)	263 (10.4)	199 (7.8)	219 (8.6)	124 (4.9)	34 (1.3)	7 (0.3)	10 (0.4)	16 (0.6)	47 (1.9)	165 (6.5)	230 (9.1)	251 (9.9)	1,565 (61.6)

== Economy ==
The main commercial centers of the city are the Avenida Comercial (divided into North and South), Avenida Central and Avenida Hélio Prates, the Alameda Shopping and the so-called Pistão Sul, where the Taguatinga Shopping, hypermarkets, a fashion fair, a business center, several colleges, a soft drink factory, and numerous car dealers, among other establishments, are located.

A small industrial center (the QI) is located between Avenida Samdu Norte and Avenida Hélio Prates. There is another important industrial area near BR-060.

The region known as "Sector H Norte", near BR-070, concentrates a large variety of workshops and auto-parts stores. In the QNL sector, near Avenida Elmo Serejo, there is a small printing industry sector (SIGT).

The city was the 12th region with the most expensive launches in Brazil in 2012, according to the "Anuário do Mercado Imobiliário Brasileiro da Lopes", with eight developments, 1,192 units and 639 million reais in "Overall Sales Value". Comparatively, the DF was the fourth largest national market in 2012, with launches totaling a VGV of 3.3 billion reais.

== Transport ==
=== Roads ===
The so-called "Park Roads" connect Taguatinga to the Plano Piloto. There are three access roads:

- DF-075 (Estrada Parque Núcleo Bandeirante - EPNB);
- DF-085 (Estrada Parque Taguatinga - EPTG, or "Green Line");
- DF-095 (Ceilândia Park Road - EPCL, or "Via Estrutural").

The BR-070 federal highway, which borders the northern sector of Taguatinga, gives access to the Goiás municipalities of Águas Lindas de Goiás and Pirenópolis.

Some of Taguatinga's main internal roads are:

- Avenida Comercial (North and South);
- Avenida Samdu (North and South);
- Avenida Hélio Prates;
- Pistão (North and South), local name for DF-001 (Estrada Parque Contorno - EPCT);
- Avenida Central, local name for the EPTG between Pistão and Samdu;
- Avenida Elmo Serejo (which gives access to the Elmo Serejo Farias Stadium), the local name for the EPTG after Samdu until it ends at P5 do P Sul.

=== Metro ===
Taguatinga is served by three stations of the Federal District Metro:

- Praça do Relógio Station;
- Taguatinga Sul Station;
- Centro Metropolitano Station.

There are several urban bus terminals, as well as the Taguatinga Bus Station, from where interstate buses depart.

=== Rei Pelé tunnel ===
The Rei Pelé tunnel, inaugurated on July 5, 2023, is 1,010 meters long on each side. The name was announced by the then governor of the Federal District, Ibanês Rocha, on the day of the renowned soccer star's burial. Although it was admired by a large part of the population, the name didn't please everyone, generating movements on social networks that proposed other icons truly related to the Federal District, such as Renato Russo, or simply calling it the Taguatinga Tunnel. The project cost a total of 640 million reais.

== See also ==
- List of administrative regions of the Federal District
