= Varjão, Federal District =

Varjão
- Administrative region
- Região Administrativa de Varjão; Administrative Region of Varjão
- Location of Varjão in the Federal District
- Coordinates: 15°42′35″S 47°52′44″W
- Country: Brazil
- Region: Central-West
- State: Federal District
- Established: 19 April 1991

Government
  - Regional administrator: Prof. Daniel Crepaldi

Area
  - Total: 1.5 km^{2} (0.58 sq mi)

Population
  - Total: 5,371
  - Density: 3,600/km^{2} (9,300/sq mi)
- Time zone: UTC−3 (BRT)
- Area code: +55 61
- Website: www.varjao.df.gov.br

Varjão is an administrative region in the Federal District in Brazil. Varjão was founded on 19 April 1991, receiving the status of administrative region, according to Law 3153, of 6 May 2003.

== See also ==
- List of administrative regions of the Federal District
