= Brazlândia =

- Administrative region
- Região Administrativa de Brazlândia; Administrative Region of Brazlândia
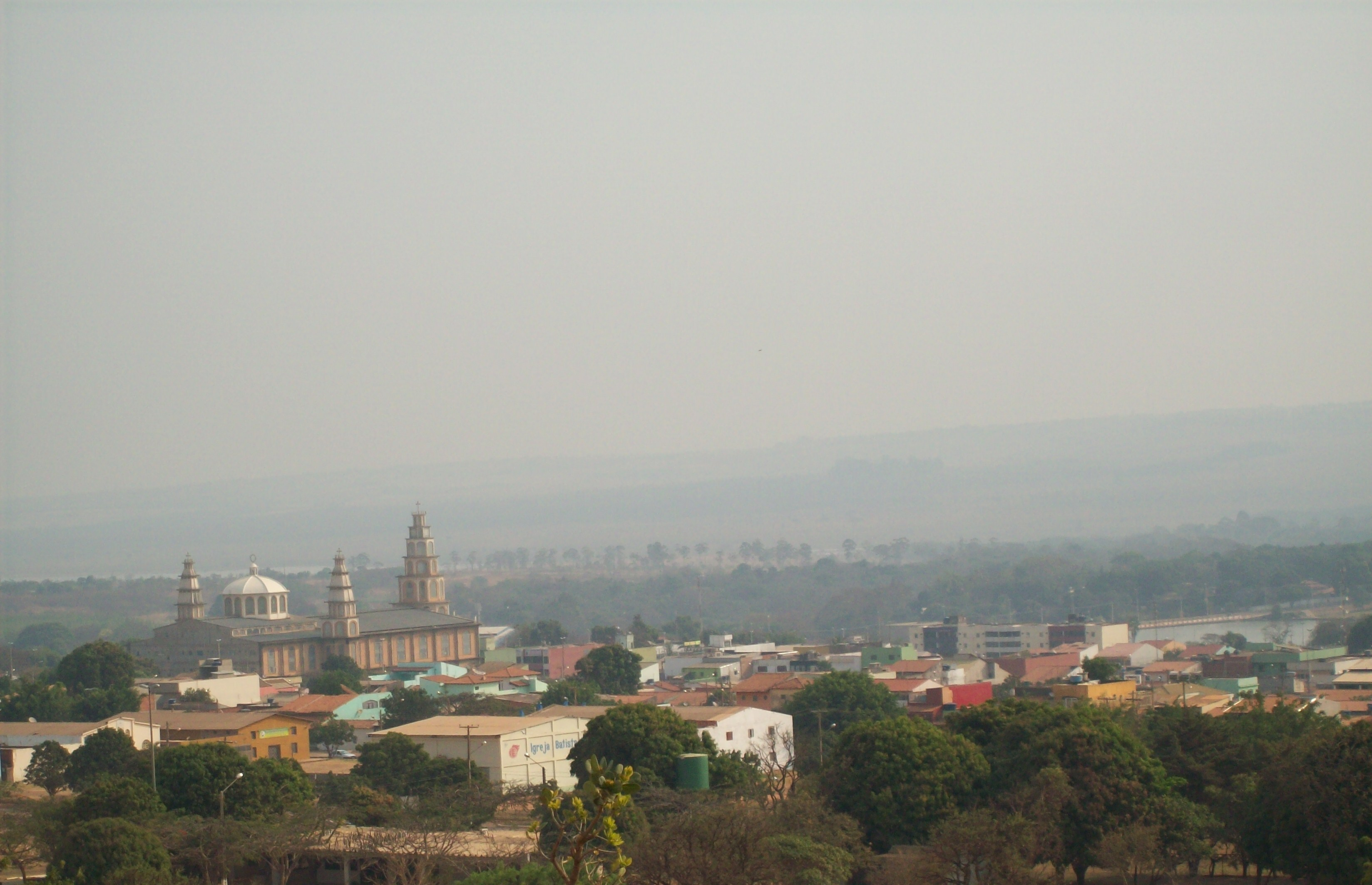
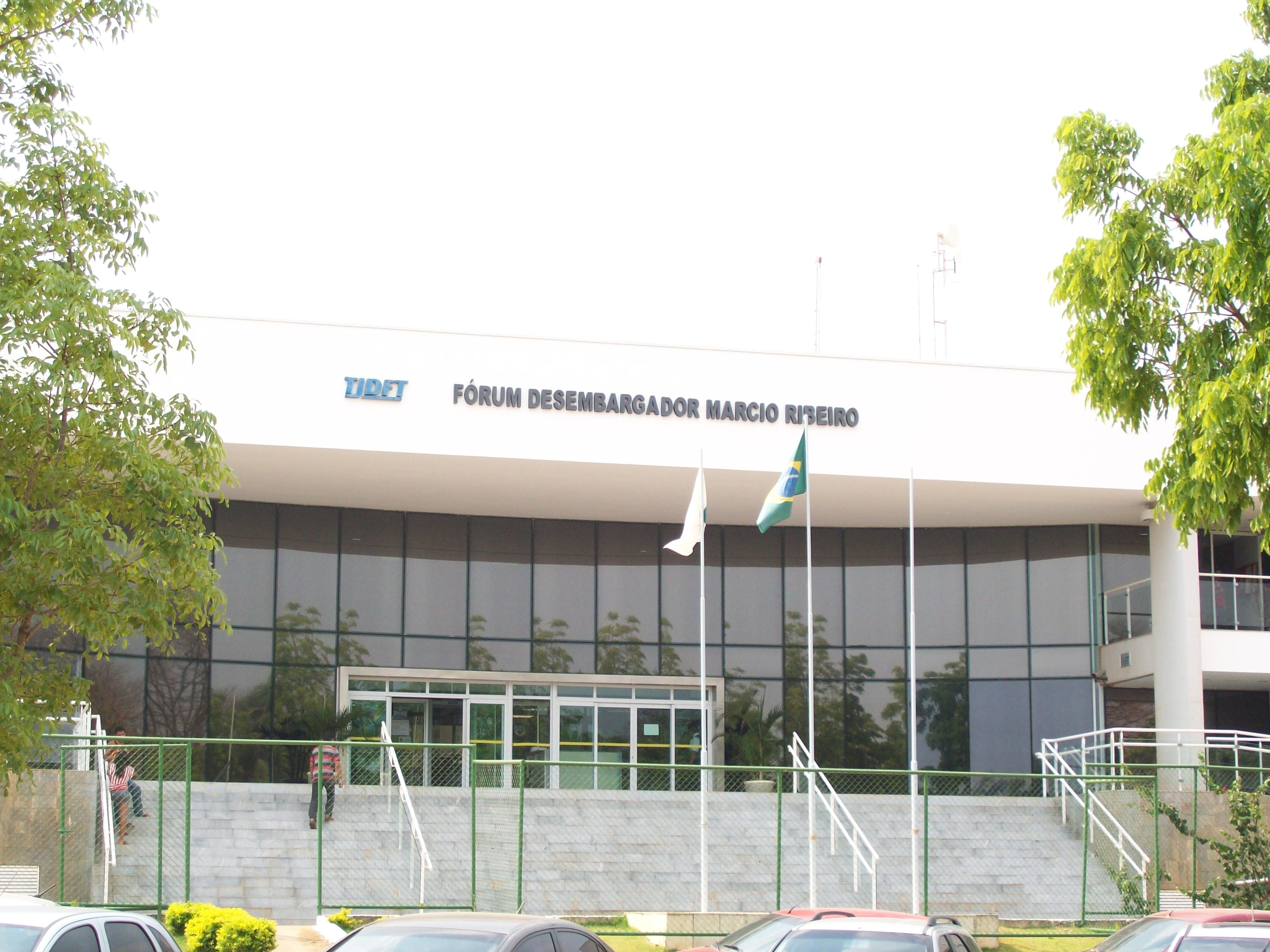
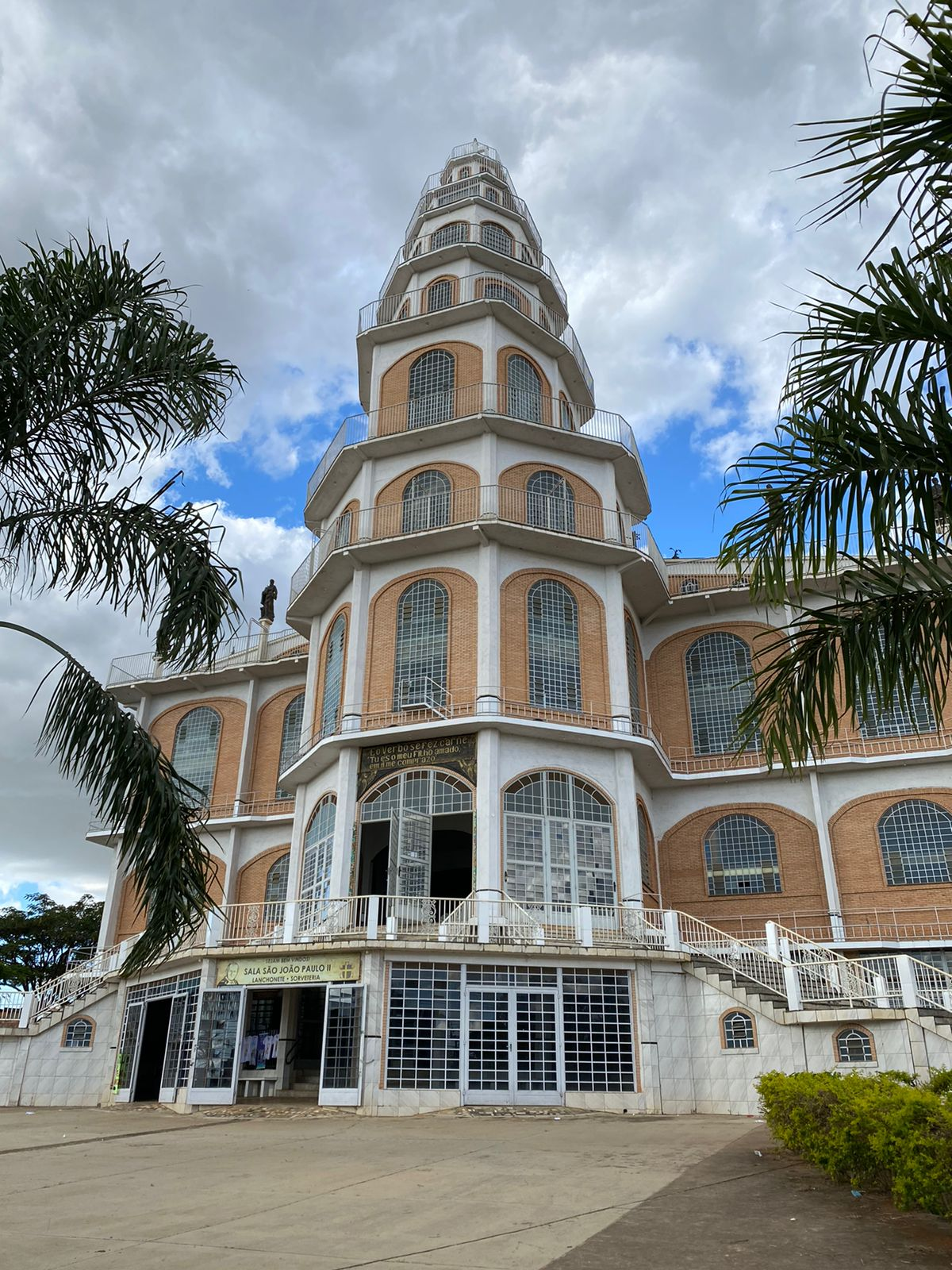
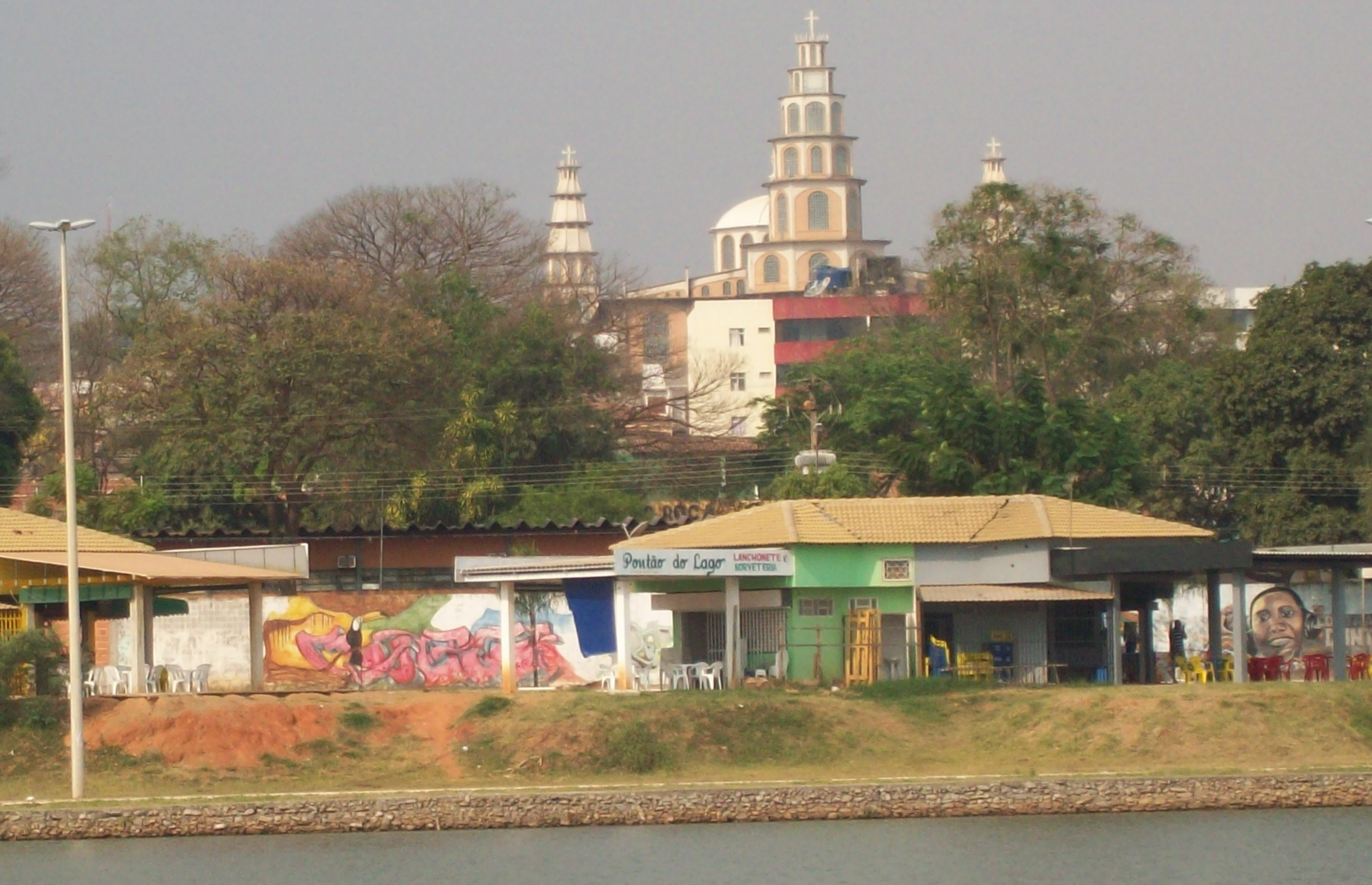
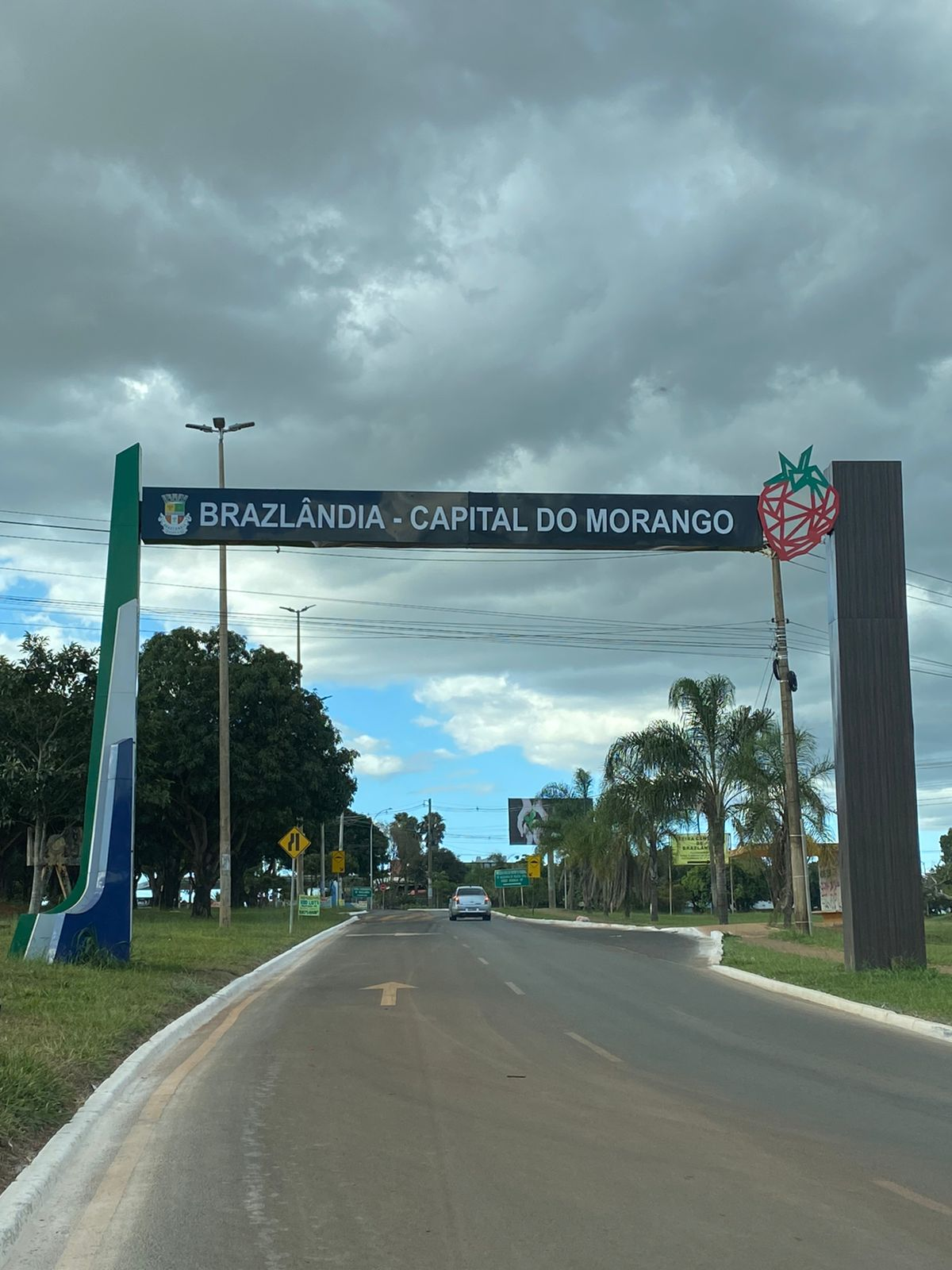
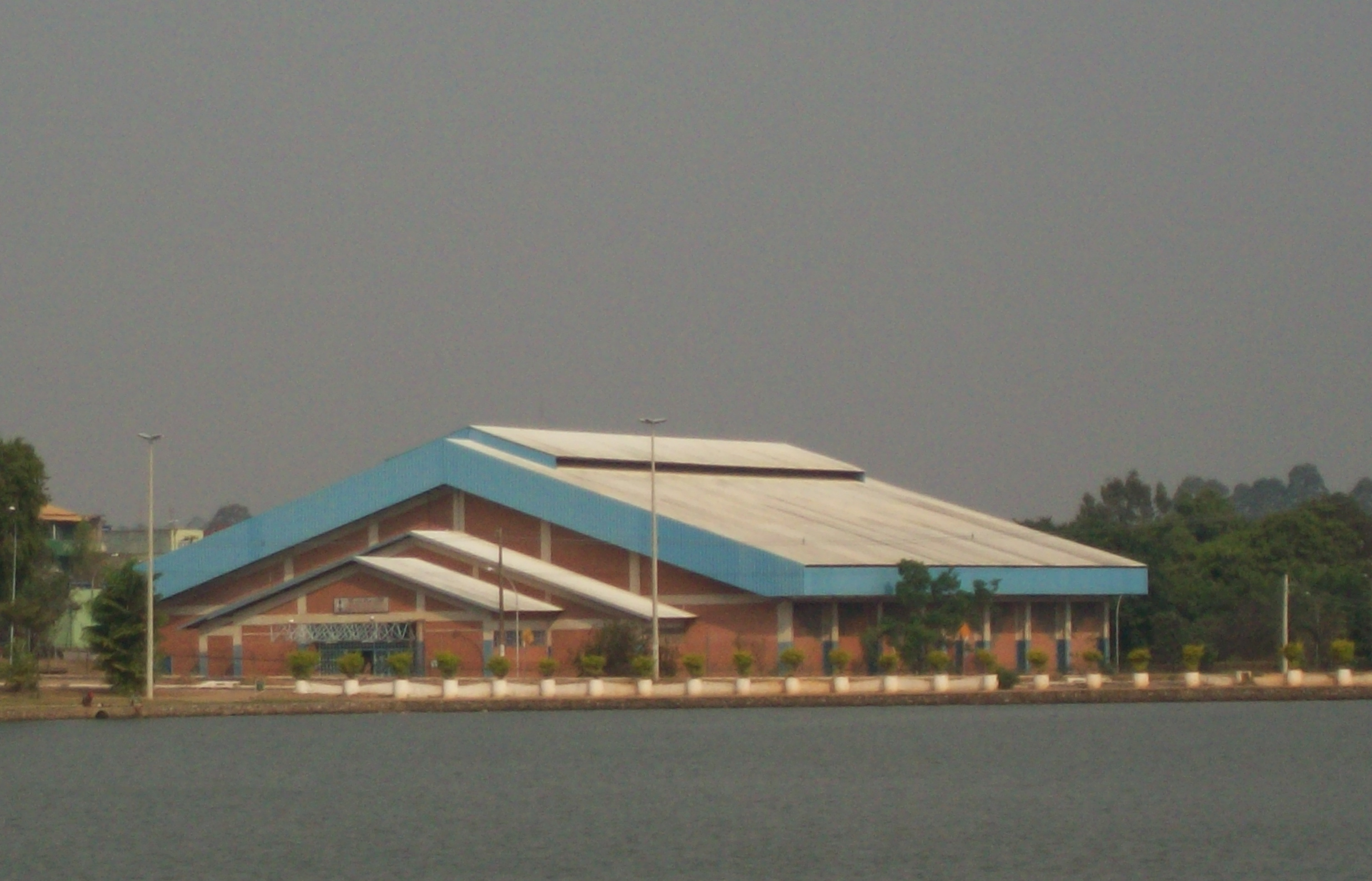
- Clockwise from top: Skyline, Sanctuary of Menino Jesus, Entrance to the region, Sports center, Lago Veredinha, Forum Desembargador Márcio Ribeiro

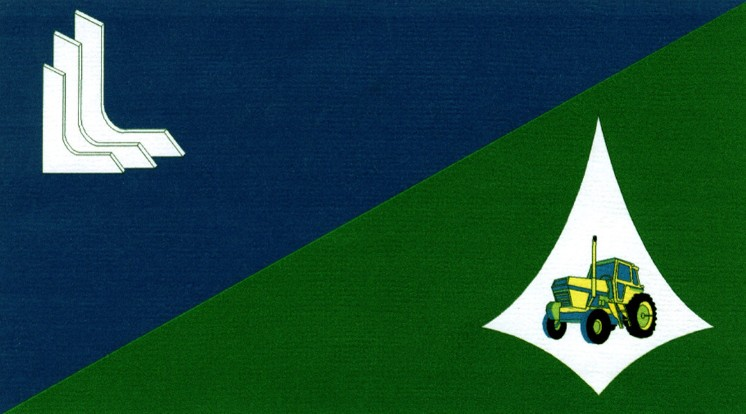
- Flag

- Localization of Brazlândia in Federal District
- Coordinates: 15°40′30″S 48°12′03″W
- Country: Brazil
- Region: Central-West
- State: Federal District
- Founded: June 5, 1933

Government
  - Regional administrator: Devanir Gonçalves de Oliveira

Area
  - Total: 474.83 km^{2} (183.33 sq mi)

Population (2010)
  - Total: 53.874
- Time zone: UTC−3 (BRT)
- Postal Code (CEP): 72700-000
- Area code: +55 61
- Website: www.brazlandia.df.gov.br

Brazlândia (Portuguese pronunciation: [bɾazˈlɐ̃n.dʒiɐ]) is the second oldest administrative region in the Federal District in Brazil. It is bordered by Sobradinho II to the northeast, Brasília to the east, and Taguatinga and Ceilândia to the south. Brazlândia was founded on June 5, 1933, receiving the status of administrative region, according to Law 4545, of December 10, 1964. Its current administrator is Devanir Gonçalves de Oliveira. It has a population of approximately 55,000 people.

== Geography ==
Brazlandia has a tropical savanna climate (Aw, according to the Köppen climate classification). In general, the temperature ranges from 14 to 30 °C (57 to 86 °F) and is rarely lower than 10 °C (50 °F) or higher than 30 °C (86 °F). Most of the year the climate is warm and pleasant, and this continues between August and October, with an average daily maximum temperature of over 22 °C (72 °F). The hottest month of the year is October, with a maximum of 29 °C (84 °F) and a minimum of 18 °C (64 °F) on average.

== Transportation ==
The main access road to Brazlândia is the Expresso São José 27, and the main highways that access the administrative region are the Estrada Parque do Contorno - EPCT (DF-001), DF-170, DF-180, DF-206, DF-220 and DF-240, BR-251, as well as the Federal Highway BR-080 which connects to the Belém-Brasília highway, shortening access to the north and south of the country by approximately 300 km (190 mi). In other words, Brazlândia is a hub for the country's North and South National Integration Hubs.

== See also ==
- List of administrative regions of the Federal District
