= Administrative regions of the Federal District (Brazil) =

Overview of administrative divisions of Federal District, Brazil

Map of the current Administrative Regions

The administrative regions of the Federal District (Portuguese: regiões administrativas do Distrito Federal, RADF or RA) are administrative divisions of the Federal District, Brazil. They have similar jurisdiction to municipalities, albeit with a much lesser degree of autonomy. However, administrators are not directly elected, but appointed by the Governor of the Federal District. Moreover, administrative regions have no specific legislative representation apart from the district-wide Legislative Chamber of the Federal District.

== History ==
The Federal District was first divided into administrative regions by a 1964 federal law. Prior to this, the regions were not officially defined, but the seven oldest seats of government (Gama, Taguatinga, Brazlândia, Sobradinho, Planaltina, Paranoá, and Núcleo Bandeirante) already existed and were often called satellite cities (Portuguese: cidades satélites) to the capital Brasília, located in the Brasília administrative region.

The 1988 Constitution of Brazil divides the country into federated states and these into municipalities with a degree of autonomy, headed by an elected mayor, but explicitly forbids the Federal District to divide into municipalities. It is instead divided into administrative regions headed by a regional administrator who is appointed by the Governor of the Federal District , as opposed to the elected mayors of municipalities.

Regional administrations are tasked with representing the government of the Federal District and coordinating local public services, and carry out most tasks reserved for municipalities, except for matters exclusive to states, which are handled by the governor themself.

== List of administrative regions ==
As of December 2023, there were 35 administrative regions in the Federal District.

| Number | Administrative region | Administrator | Foundation (Note: Establishment date of main settlement in region) | Legalization |
|---|---|---|---|---|
| I | Brasília | Valdemar Medeiros | 21 April 1960 | 10 December 1964 |
| II | Gama | Joseane Araújo Feitosa | 12 October 1960 | 10 December 1964 |
| III | Taguatinga | Renato Andrade dos Santos | 5 June 1958 | 10 December 1964 |
| IV | Brazlândia | Marcelo Gonçalves da Cunha | 5 June 1933 | 10 December 1964 |
| V | Sobradinho | Gutemberg Tosatte Gomes | 13 May 1960 | 10 December 1964 |
| VI | Planaltina | Wesley Fonseca Fraga | 19 August 1859 | 10 December 1964 |
| VII | Paranoá | Wellington Cardoso de Santana | 25 October 1957 | 10 December 1964 |
| VIII | Núcleo Bandeirante | Cláudio Márcio de Oliveira | 19 December 1956 | 10 December 1964 |
| IX | Ceilândia | Dilson Resende de Almeida | 27 March 1971 | 25 October 1989 |
| X | Guará | Artur da Cunha Nogueira | 5 May 1969 | 25 October 1989 |
| XI | Cruzeiro | Gustavo de Almeida Aires | 30 November 1959 | 25 October 1989 |
| XII | Samambaia | Marcos Leite de Araújo | 25 October 1989 | 25 October 1989 |
| XIII | Santa Maria | Marileide Alves da Silva Romão | 10 February 1991 | 4 November 1992 |
| XIV | São Sebastião | Roberto Medeiros Santos | 25 June 1993 | 25 June 1993 |
| XV | Recanto das Emas | Carlos Dalvan Soares de Oliveira | 28 July 1993 | 28 July 1993 |
| XVI | Lago Sul | Rubens Santoro Neto | 30 August 1960 | 10 January 1994 |
| XVII | Riacho Fundo | Fernando Siqueira Guimarães | 13 March 1990 | 15 December 1993 |
| XVIII | Lago Norte | Marcelo Ferreira da Silva | 10 January 1960 | 10 January 1994 |
| XIX | Candangolândia | Pablo de Sousa Valente Lima | 3 November 1956 | 27 January 1994 |
| XX | Águas Claras | Mário Henrique Furtado Rocha de Sousa | 16 December 1992 | 6 May 2003 |
| XXI | Riacho Fundo II | Ana Maria da Silva | 6 May 1995 | 6 May 2003 |
| XXII | Sudoeste/Octogonal | Alcidino Vieira Júnior | 10 July 1989 | 6 May 2003 |
| XXIII | Varjão | Daniel Damasceno Crepaldi | 19 April 1991 | 6 May 2003 |
| XXIV | Park Way | Deusdete Soares Benevides | 13 March 1961 | 29 December 2003 |
| XXV | SCIA | Alceu Prestes de Mattos | 25 October 1989 | 27 January 2004 |
| XXVI | Sobradinho II | Diego Rodrigues Rafael Matos | 11 October 1991 | 27 January 2004 |
| XXVII | Jardim Botânico | Aderivaldo Martins Cardoso | 13 December 1999 | 31 August 2004 |
| XXVIII | Itapoã | Raimundo Risonaldo Paz | 3 January 2005 | 3 January 2005 |
| XXIX | SIA | Raphael Eugênio Marques | 21 April 1969 | 14 July 2005 |
| XXX | Vicente Pires | Gilvando Galdino Fernandes | 26 May 1989 | 26 May 2009 |
| XXXI | Fercal | Fernando Gustavo Lima | 11 September 1956 | 29 January 2012 |
| XXXII | Sol Nascente/Pôr do Sol | Cláudio Ferreira Domingues | 14 August 1999 | 14 August 2019 |
| XXXIII | Arniqueira | Telma Rufino | 30 September 1999 | 30 September 2019 |
| XXXIV | Arapoanga | Sérgio de Araújo | 21 December 1992 | 21 December 2022 |
| XXXV | Água Quente | Lúcia Gomes da Silva | 21 December 1992 | 21 December 2022 |

== See also ==
- Administrative region (Brazil)
- Geography of Brazil
- List of cities in Brazil
