= Roncador (disambiguation) =

Roncador can refer to:

Brazil

- Roncador, Paraná, municipality in Paraná, Brazil
- Roncador Ecological Reserve, protected area near Brasilia
- Roncador Oil Field, oil field off Brazilian coast, site of Petrobras 36 Oil Platform
- Pico do Roncador, highest mountain of the Federal District

Colombia

- Roncador Bank, Colombia
- Roncador Cay, Colombia

Solomon Islands

- Roncador Reef, Solomon Islands

Other

- Spotfin croaker (Roncador stearnsii), Pacific fish
- USS Roncador (SS-301), World War II submarine
