= Coat of arms of the Federal District (Brazil) =

- Armiger: Ibaneis Rocha, Governor of the Federal District
- Adopted: 12 September 1960
- Motto: Venturis ventis

The coat of arms of the Federal District is one of the official symbols of the Federal District of Brazil. It was created by the poet Guilherme de Almeida and instituted on 12 September 1960. Avoiding traditional heraldry, the design features innovative shapes, similar to the architecture of the Brazilian capital created by Oscar Niemeyer.

The shield, whose format is based on the columns of the Palácio da Alvorada, is divided into green and gold. The colours, however, are not of the shade of the Brazilian flag, resembling more the ones used on the flag of the Federal District. It bears, in the center, a green shield with the so-called Cross of Brasília, formed of four diverging arrows that symbolize the action of power, topped by a meeting table, indicating to be there the place of the National Congress of Brazil. Below, in Latin, the motto of the Federal District: venturis ventis ("to the coming winds").
