= São Sebastião, Federal District =

São Sebastião
- Administrative region
- Região Administrativa de São Sebastião; Administrative Region of São Sebastião
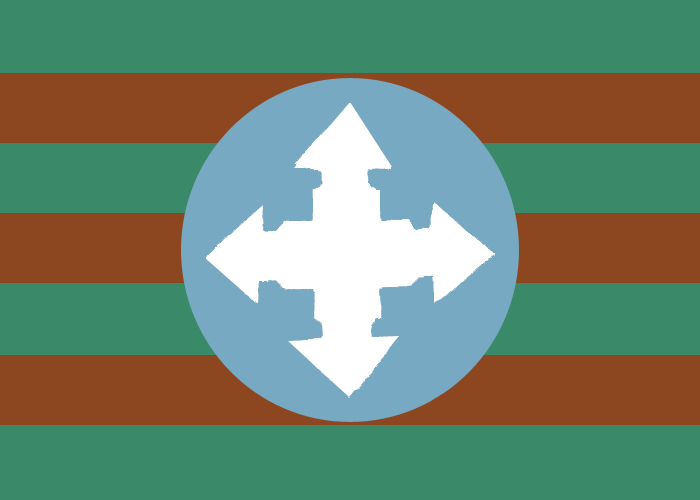
- Flag

- Location of São Sebastião in the Federal District
- Coordinates: 15°54′02″S 47°46′46″W
- Country: Brazil
- Region: Central-West
- State: Federal District
- Established: June 25, 1993

Government
  - Regional administrator: Alan José Valim Maia

Area
  - Total: 262.7 km^{2} (101.4 sq mi)

Population
  - Total: 119,293
  - Density: 454.1/km^{2} (1,176/sq mi)
- Time zone: UTC-3 (UTC-3)
  - Summer (DST): UTC-2 (UTC-2)
- Area code: +55 61
- Website: www.saosebastiao.df.gov.br

São Sebastião is an administrative region in the Federal District in Brazil. São Sebastião was founded on June 25, 1993, receiving the status of administrative region, according to Law 467, of June 25, 1993.

== See also ==
- List of administrative regions of the Federal District
