= Santa Maria, Federal District =

Santa Maria
- Administrative region
- Região Administrativa de Santa Maria; Administrative Region of Santa Maria
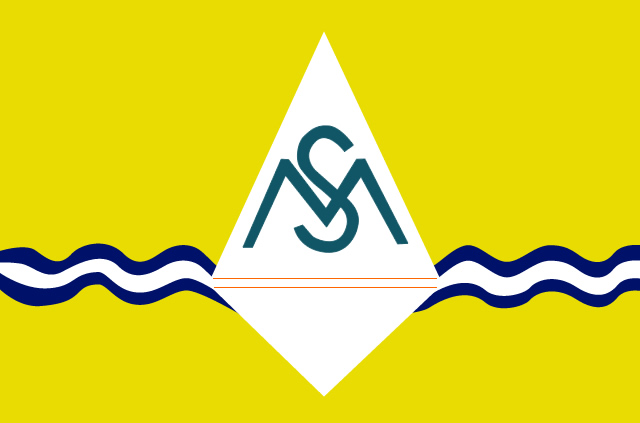
- Flag

- Location of Santa Maria in the Federal District
- Coordinates: 16°00′55″S 48°00′47″W
- Country: Brazil
- Region: Central-West
- State: Federal District
- Established: 10 February 1991

Government
  - Regional administrator: Marileide Romão

Area
  - Total: 215.86 km^{2} (83.34 sq mi)

Population
  - Total: 115,607
  - Density: 535.56/km^{2} (1,387.1/sq mi)
- Time zone: UTC-3 (UTC-3)
  - Summer (DST): UTC-2 (UTC-2)
- Area code: +55 61
- Website: www.santamaria.df.gov.br

Santa Maria is an administrative region in the Federal District in Brazil. Santa Maria was founded on 10 February 1991, receiving the status of administrative region, according to Law 348, of 4 November 1992.

== Notable people ==
- Felipe Anderson Football player

== See also ==
- List of administrative regions of the Federal District
