= Pico do Roncador =

Tallest mountain in Federal District, Brazil

- Location within Brazil

Highest point
- Elevation: 1,341 m (4,400 ft)
- Listing: List of mountains in Brazil
- Coordinates: 15°35′S 48°07′W

Geography
- Location: Federal District, Brazil
- Parent range: Brazilian Highlands

Pico do Roncador is the highest mountain of the Federal District, Brazil, reaching 1,341 metres (4,400 ft) above sea level. It is located in Brazlândia, to the northwest of Brasília.
