= Sobradinho II =

- Administrative region
- Região Administrativa de Sobradinho II; Administrative Region of Sobradinho II
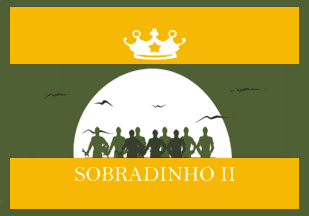
- Flag

- Location of Sobardinho II in the Federal District
- Coordinates: 15°38′37″S 47°49′33″W
- Country: Brazil
- Region: Central-West
- State: Federal District
- Established: 11 October 1991

Population
  - Total: 105,363
- Time zone: UTC-3 (UTC-3)
  - Summer (DST): UTC-2 (UTC-2)
- Website: www.sobradinhoii.df.gov.br

Sobradinho II is an administrative region in the Federal District in Brazil. It is located to the northeast of Brasília. Sobradinho II is bordered by Fercal to the north, Sobradinho to the east, and Brasília to the southwest. Sobradinho II was founded on 11 October 1991, receiving the status of administrative region, according to Law 3314, of 27 January 2004.
