= Riacho Fundo II =

- Administrative region
- Região Administrativa de Riacho Fundo II; Administrative Region of Riacho Fundo II
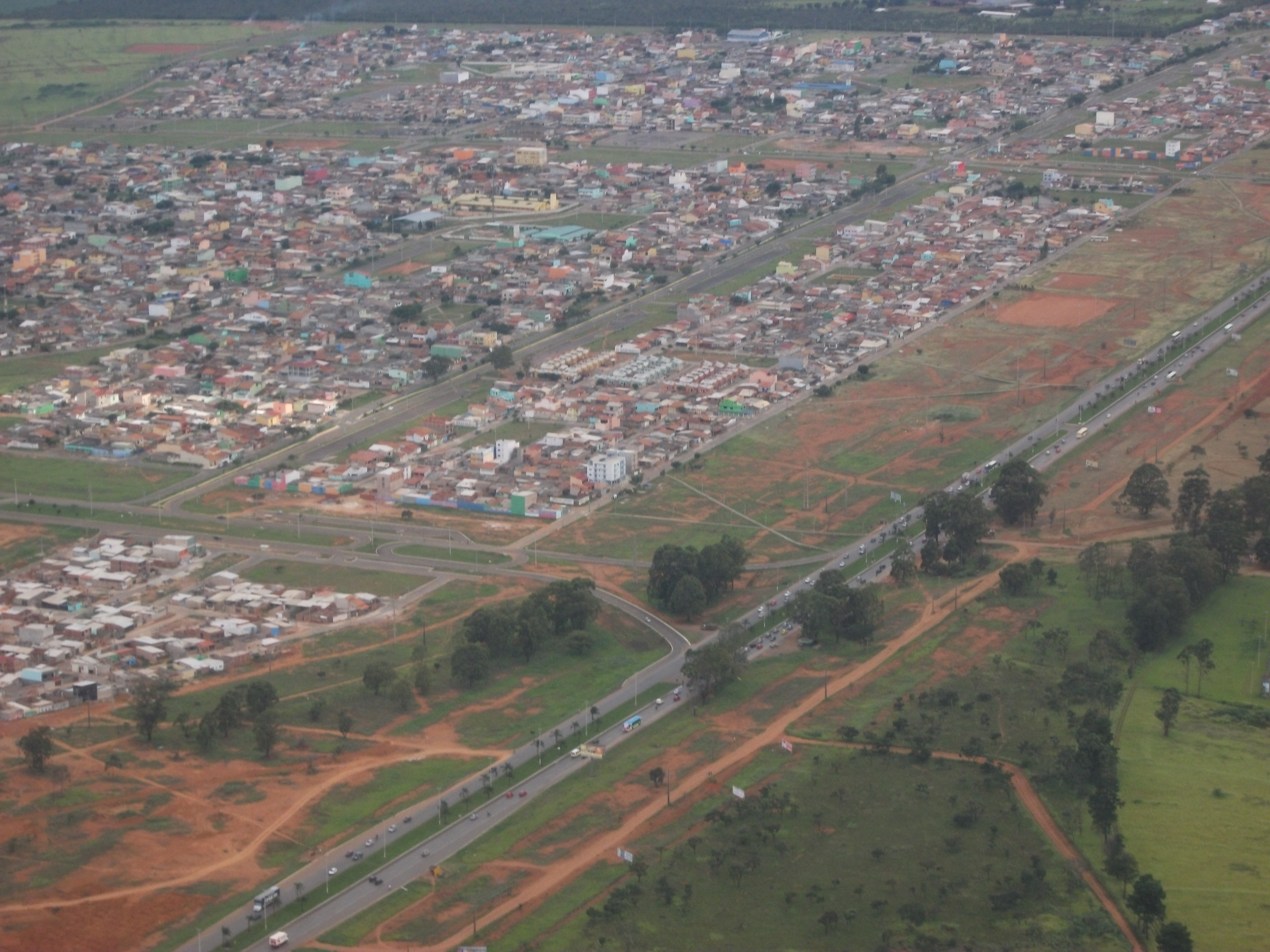

- Location of Riacho Fundo II in the Federal District
- Coordinates: 15°53′57″S 48°02′58″W
- Country: Brazil
- Region: Central-West
- State: Federal District
- Established: May 6, 1995

Government
  - Regional administrator: Ana Maria da Silva

Area
  - Total: 30.60 km^{2} (11.81 sq mi)

Population
  - Total: 85,658
  - Density: 2,799/km^{2} (7,250/sq mi)
- Time zone: UTC−3 (BRT)
- Website: www.riachofundoii.df.gov.br

Riacho Fundo II is an administrative region in the Federal District in Brazil. Riacho Fundo II was founded on May 6, 1995, receiving the status of administrative region, according to Law 3153, of May 6, 2003. It is bordered by Samambaia to the north, Riacho Fundo to the northeast, Park Way to the southeast, and Gama and Recanto das Emas to the southwest.
