= Jardim Botânico, Federal District =

Jardim Botânico
- Administrative region
- Região Administrativa de Jardim Botânico; Administrative Region of Jardim Botânico
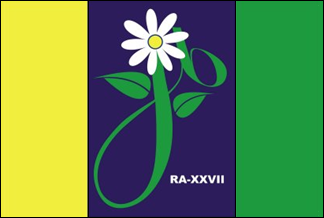
- Flag

- Location of Jardim Botânico in the Federal District
- Coordinates: 15°52′00″S 47°47′21″W
- Country: Brazil
- Region: Central-West
- State: Federal District
- Established: December 13, 1999

Government
  - Regional administrator: Aderivaldo Martins Cardoso

Area
  - Total: 292 km^{2} (113 sq mi)

Population
  - Total: 51,650
- Time zone: UTC−3 (BRT)
- Area code: +55 61
- Website: www.admjardimbotanico.df.gov.br

Jardim Botânico is an administrative region in the Federal District in Brazil. The administrative region is basically made up of gated communities. The area formerly belonged to the Taboquinha and Papuda farms, although there is controversy regarding the correct delimitation of each. Jardim Botânico was founded on December 13, 1999, receiving the status of administrative region, according to Law 3435, of August 31, 2004.

== See also ==
- List of administrative regions of the Federal District
