= Federal District (Brazil) =

Smallest federal unit of Brazil, containing Brasília

- Federal district
- Flag Coat of arms
- Motto: Venturis Ventis (Latin) "To the coming winds"
- Location in Brazil
- Interactive map of Federal District
- Coordinates: 15°47′42″S 47°45′28″W
- Country: Brazil
- Region: Central-West
- Seat of government: Brasília

Government
  - Type: Unitary state
  - Governor: Celina Leão (PP)
  - Vice Governor: Vacant
  - Senators: Damares Alves (Republicanos); Izalci Lucas (PL); Leany Lemos (PSB)
  - Legislature: Legislative Chamber of the Federal District

Area
  - Total: 5,760 km^{2} (2,220 sq mi)
  - Rank: 27th

Population (2024 estimate)
  - Total: 2,982,818
  - Rank: 20th
  - Density: 518/km^{2} (1,340/sq mi)
  - Rank: 1st
- Demonym: Candango

GDP (2024)
  - Total: R$382.238 billion (US$70.93 billion)

HDI
- Time zone: UTC−03:00 (BRT)
- Postal Code: 70000-000 to 73690-000
- ISO 3166 code: BR-DF
- HDI (2024): 0.866 (1st) – very high
- Website: www.df.gov.br

The Federal District (Portuguese: Distrito Federal [dʒisˈtɾitu fedeˈɾaw]) is one of 27 federative units of Brazil. Located in the Center-West Region, it is the smallest Brazilian federal unit and the only one that has no municipalities, being divided into 35 administrative regions. The federal capital of Brazil, Brasília, which is also the seat of government of the Federal District, is located in its territory. The Federal District shares a small border with Minas Gerais and is otherwise surrounded by the state of Goiás.

Historical population
| Year | Pop. | ±% |
|---|---|---|
| 1970 | 141,742 | — |
| 1980 | 546,015 | +285.2% |
| 1991 | 1,203,333 | +120.4% |
| 2000 | 1,598,415 | +32.8% |
| 2010 | 2,570,160 | +60.8% |
| 2024 | 2,982,818 | +16.1% |

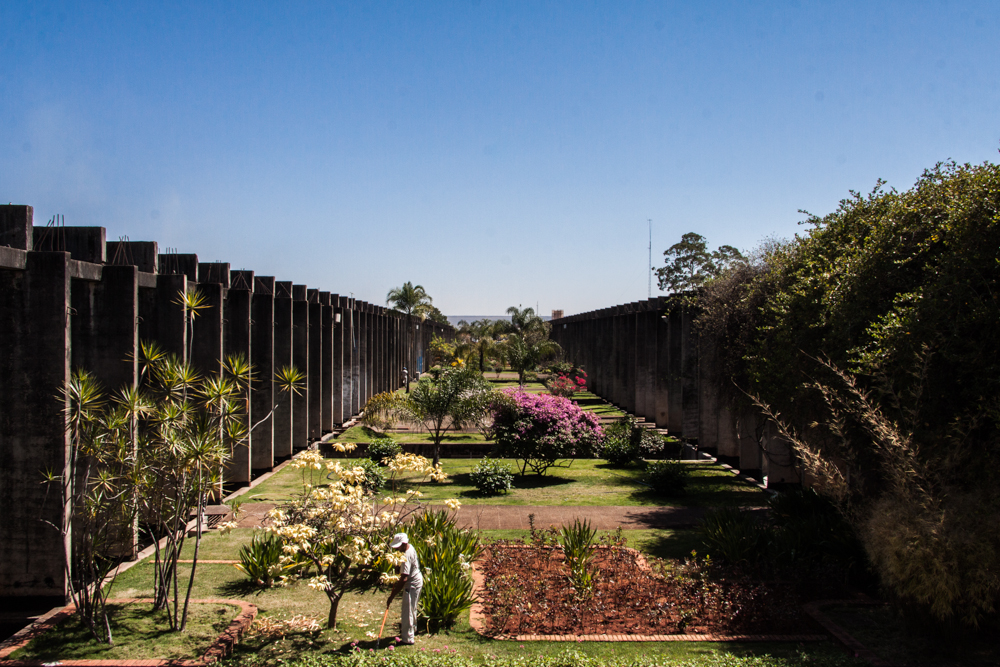
University of Brasília's Central Institute of Sciences

== History ==
From the first republican constitution there was already a device that foresaw the move of the federal capital from Rio de Janeiro, at that time in the former Federal District (1889–1960), to the interior of the country. In 1891 the Exploration Commission of the Central Highlands of Brazil was appointed, led by astronomer Luiz Cruls and composed of doctors, geologists and botanists, who made a study on topography, climate, geology, flora, fauna and other material resources of the region of the Central Highlands The area was known as Quadrilateral Cruls and was presented in 1894 to the Republican Government.

In 1922 a commission of the Federal Government established the location in Goiás, but the project was shelved. Only in 1955, during that year's presidential election, was the idea revived. Then presidential candidate Juscelino Kubitschek said he would transfer the capital during a campaign rally in the city of Jataí if he was elected. Elected president, he established the construction of Brasília as a meta-synthesis of his Plano de Metas.

In 1956, after being elected to the presidency, Kubitschek on his own initiative, sent a message to Congress proposing the creation of the New Capital Urbanization Company (Novacap). After the congress approved the project, in September of the same year, the president signed the law that created the company.

As a result, Novacap, a public company, was given the task of planning and executing the construction of the federal capital in the region delimited by General José Pessoa. After a public competition to select the city's pilot plan, a judging committee chose the urban design by architect Lúcio Costa, which was unanimously approved by the Chamber of Deputies and the Senate. This also made the name "Brasília" official, as well as the choice of Oscar Niemeyer as architect and Joaquim Cardozo as structural engineer.

Construction began that same year, under the supervision of Niemeyer and Israel Pinheiro. The Bandeirante Nucleus was then formed, with candangos (workers who worked on the construction of Brasília, initially from Goiás, Minas Gerais and mainly the Northeast). Earthworks began in November 1956. Thirty thousand workers built Brasília in 41 months. Pinheiro was appointed the first mayor of the Federal District on April 17, 1960, shortly before its inauguration on April 21, 1960, the date chosen by Kubitschek in honor of Tiradentes.

The capital of Brazil was transferred from Rio de Janeiro to Brasília on 21 April 1960 and its new territory, split off from Goiás state on the border with the Minas Gerais state, became the current Federal District. After the transfer the old Federal District, containing the city of Rio de Janeiro, became the state of Guanabara. This state existed from 1960 until 1975, when it merged with the state of Rio de Janeiro. With the merger the capital of Rio de Janeiro state was transferred back from Niterói to Rio de Janeiro itself (as it had been until 1834 when the empire created the Neutral Municipality).

== Demographics ==
According to the IBGE census of 2007, there were 2,393,000 people residing in the Federal District. The population density was 410.9 inhabitants per square kilometre (1,064/sq mi).

- Urbanization: 94% (2006).
- Population growth: 2.8% (1991–2000).
- Houses: 697,000 (2006).

=== Subdivisions ===
The Federal District is subdivided into 35 administrative regions.

| Number | Administrative region |
|---|---|
| I | Plano Piloto |
| II | Gama |
| III | Taguatinga |
| IV | Brazlândia |
| V | Sobradinho |
| VI | Planaltina |
| VII | Paranoá |
| VIII | Núcleo Bandeirante |
| IX | Ceilândia |
| X | Guará |
| XI | Cruzeiro |
| XII | Samambaia |
| XIII | Santa Maria |
| XIV | São Sebastião |
| XV | Recanto das Emas |
| XVI | Lago Sul |
| XVII | Riacho Fundo |
| XVIII | Lago Norte |
| XIX | Candangolândia |
| XX | Águas Claras |
| XXI | Riacho Fundo II |
| XXII | Sudoeste/Octogonal |
| XXIII | Varjão |
| XXIV | Park Way |
| XXV | SCIA |
| XXVI | Sobradinho II |
| XXVII | Jardim Botânico |
| XXVIII | Itapoã |
| XXIX | SIA |
| XXX | Vicente Pires |
| XXXI | Fercal |
| XXXII | Sol Nascente/Pôr do Sol |
| XXXIII | Arniqueira |
| XXXIV | Arapoanga |
| XXXV | Água Quente |

=== Education ===
==== Educational institutions ====
- Universidade de Brasília (UnB) (University of Brasília)
- Universidade Católica de Brasília (UCB) (Catholic University of Brasília)
- Centro Universitário de Brasília (UniCEUB)
- Centro Universitário do Distrito Federal (UniDF)
- Centro Universitário Euroamericano (UNIEURO)
- Instituto de Educação Superior de Brasília (IESB)
- Escola Superior de Ciências da Saúde (ESCS)
- União Pioneira da Integração Social (UPIS)
- Universidade Paulista (UniP) (Paulista University)
- Federal Institute of Brasília (IFB)

== Geography ==
The Federal District is located in the Brazilian Highlands, having an altitude between 600 and 1,100 meters above sea level, with its highest point being the Pico do Roncador, in Serra do Sobradinho. In area, the Federal District is more than double the size of Tokyo (Japan) or the island of Maui (Hawaii, United States). Comparing dry land areas, it is slightly larger than French Polynesia, the US State of Rhode Island, or Cape Verde. It is slightly smaller than Bali (Indonesia) or Trinidad and Tobago. The District is surrounded in almost its entirety by Goiás except for a short stretch along the Preto River with Minas Gerais. The District's eastern boundary is marked by the aforementioned Preto River, an eventual tributary of the São Francisco, and its western boundary by the Descoberto, an eventual tributary of the Río de la Plata. The northern and southern boundaries are roughly straight lines.

=== Climate ===
The Federal District has a tropical savanna climate (Aw according to the Köppen system), with a rainy season from October to April, and a dry season from May to September. The altitude moderates temperatures, which throughout the year are very warm rather than uncomfortably hot: maxima range from 25 to 28 °C or 77 to 82 °F throughout the year. During the dry season (winter), the humidity can reach very low level with dangerous fire risks, mainly during the peak hours of the hottest days. The artificial Paranoá Lake, with almost 40 km^{2} (15 sq mi) and 500 million cubic metres (410,000 acre⋅ft) of water, was built to minimize the severe drought and consequent flammability of the dry season in the cerrado region.

== Government and politics ==
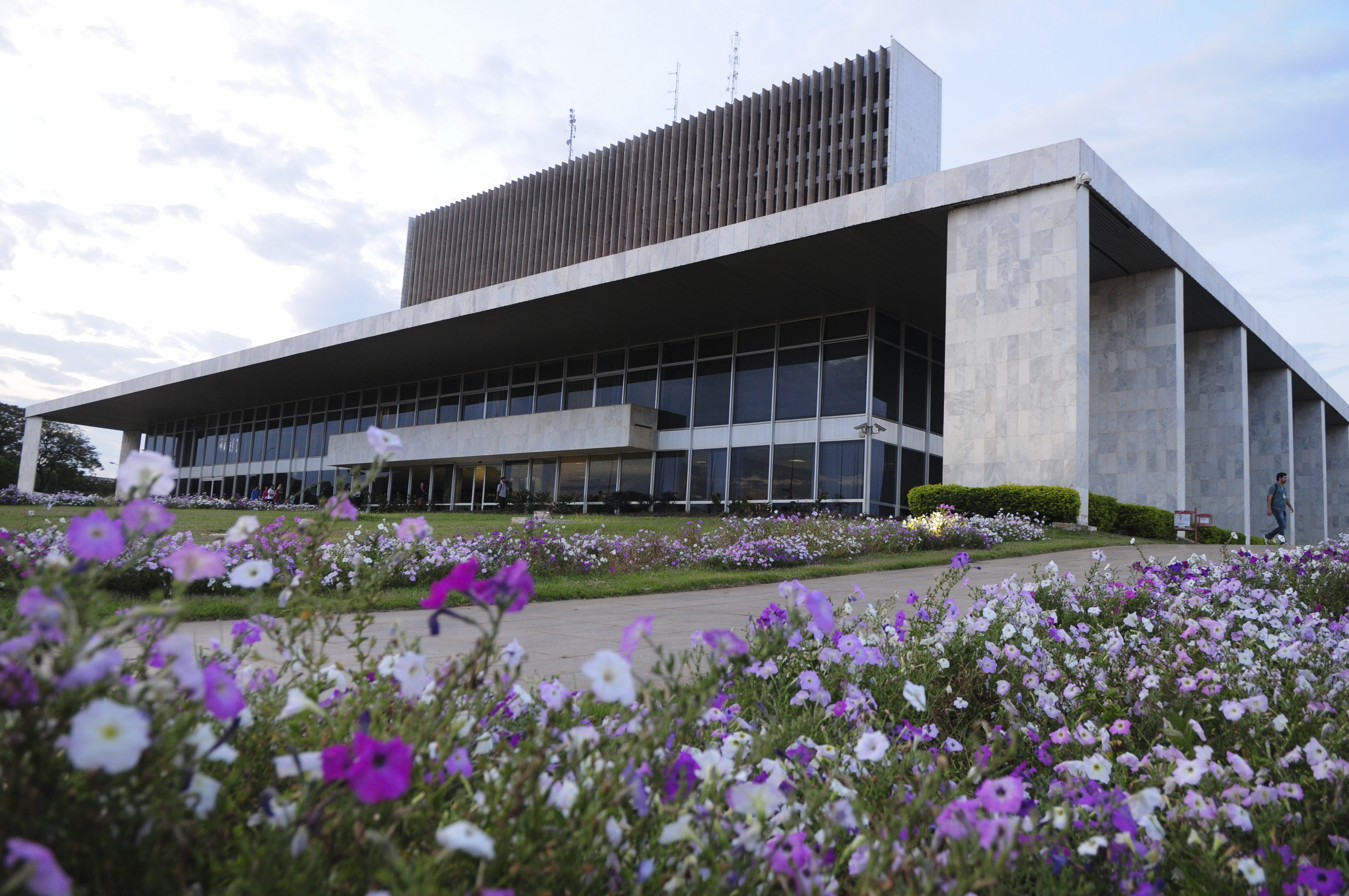
Buriti Palace, seat of the government of the Federal District

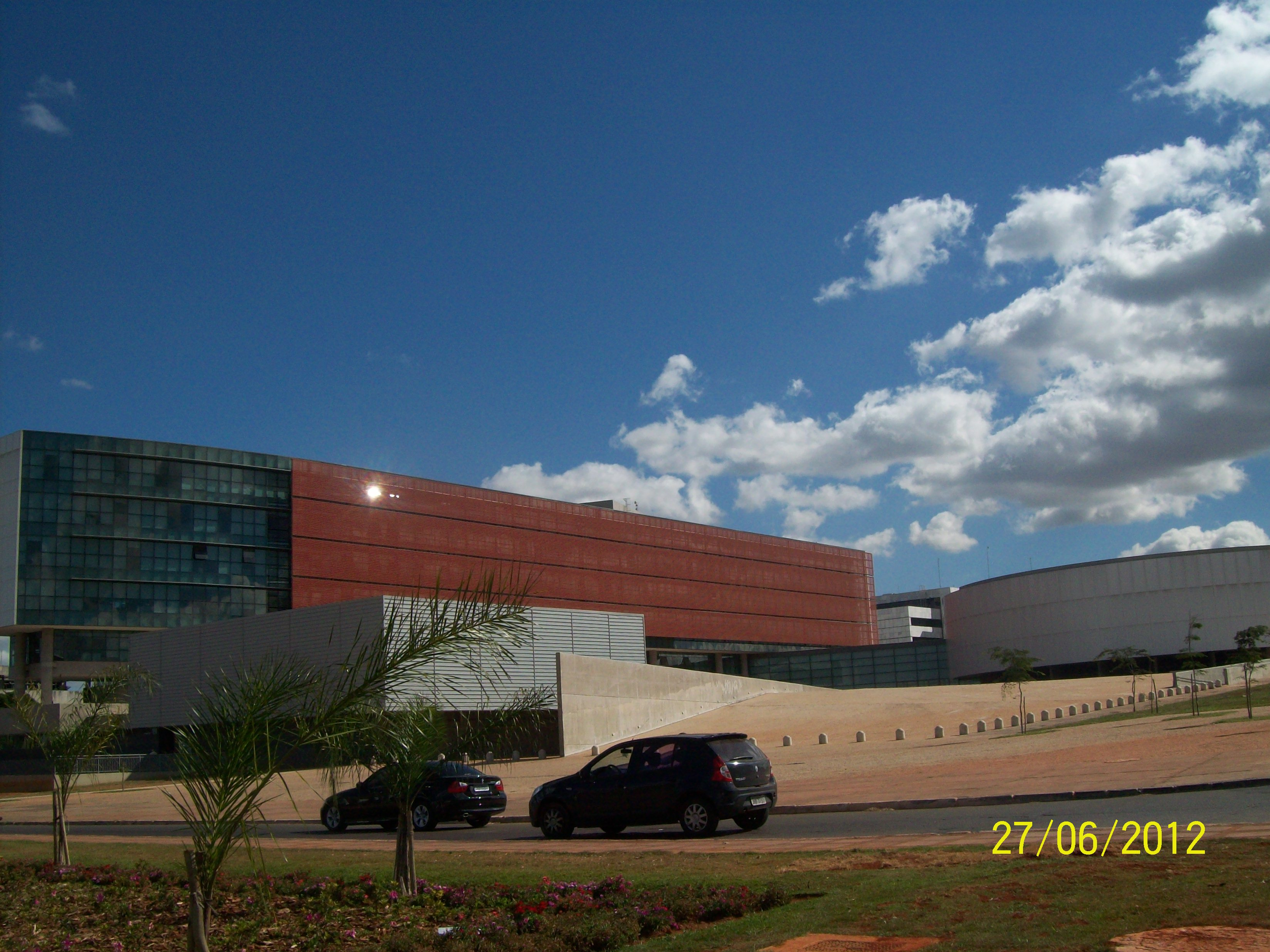
Headquarters of the Legislative Chamber of the Federal District

The politics and administration of the Federal District are distinguished from the other units of the federation in some particular points, as defined in the Brazilian Constitution of 1988:

- The Federal District is governed by an organic law, typical of municipalities, and not by a state constitution. It builds up the legislative powers reserved to states and municipalities, which are not forbidden by the Constitution.
- The hybrid character of the Federal District is observable by its Legislative Chamber, a mixture of Municipal Chamber and Legislative Assembly.
- The Legislative Power of the Federal District is exercised by the Legislative Chamber, with 24 elected district deputies; being that the head of the Executive Power is the governor.

The Federal District is a legal entity of internal public law, which is part of the political-administrative structure of Brazil, of a nature sui generis, because it is neither a state nor a municipality, but a special entity that accumulates the legislative powers reserved to the states and the municipalities, as provided in art. 32, § 1º of the CF, which gives it a hybrid nature of state and municipality.

Article 32 of the 1988 Brazilian Constitution expressly prohibits the Federal District from being divided into municipalities, being considered one. The executive power of the Federal District was represented by the mayor of the Federal District until 1969, when the position was transformed into governor of the Federal District.

The legislative power of the Federal District is represented by the Legislative Chamber of the Federal District, whose nomenclature represents a mixture of legislative assembly (legislative power of the other units of the federation) and municipal chamber (legislative of the municipalities). The Legislative Chamber is made up of 24 district deputies.

The judicial power which serves the Federal District also serves federal territories. Brazil does not have territories currently, therefore, the Court of Justice of the Federal District and of the Territories only serves the Federal District.

Part of the budget of the Federal District Government comes from the Constitutional Fund of the Federal District. In 2012, the fund totaled 9.6 billion reais. By 2015, the forecast was of 12.4 billion Reais, with more than half (6.4% of the total) billion for public security expenditures.

== Tourism and recreation ==
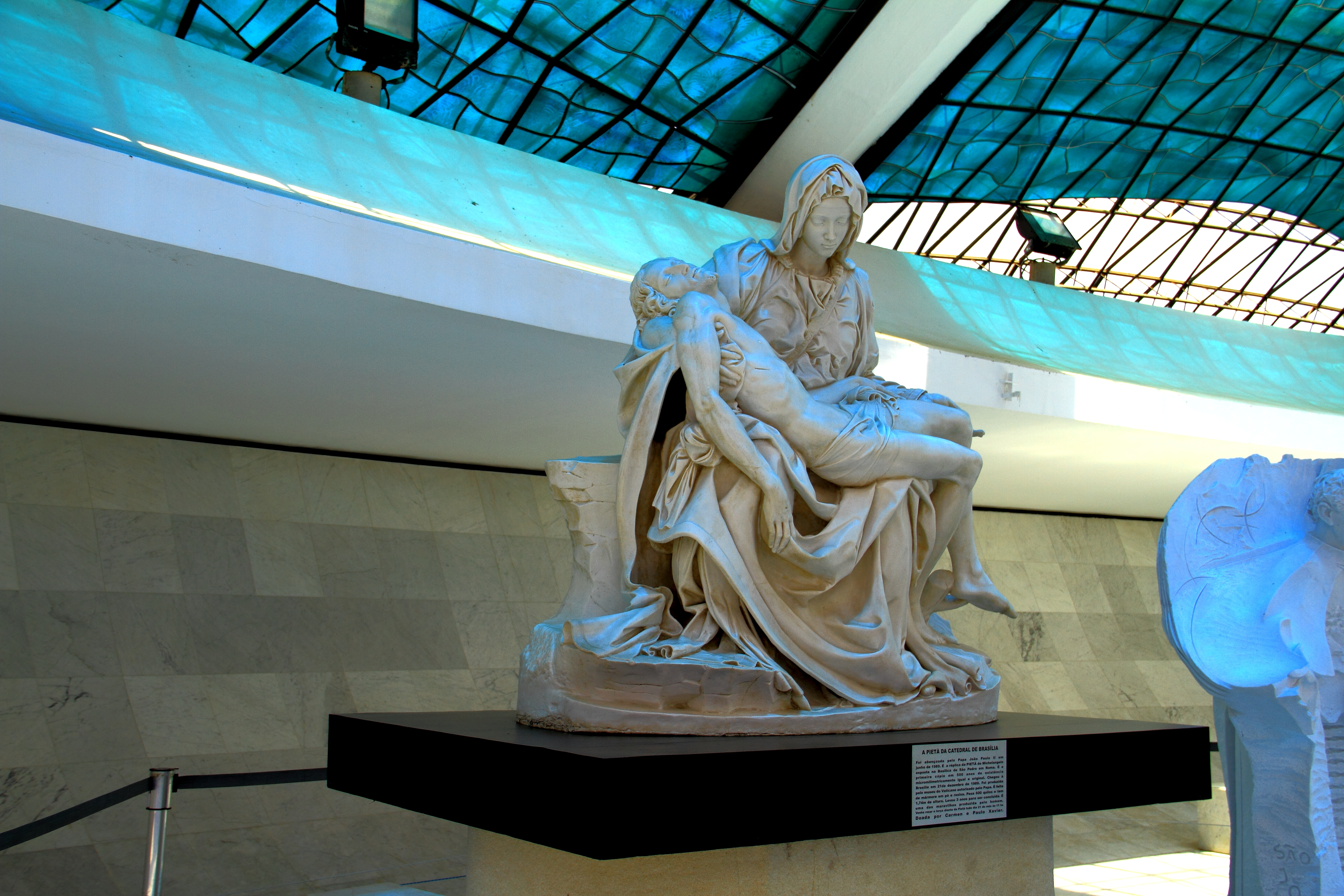
Brasília Metropolitan Cathedral

The Parque da Cidade

Located in Brasília, the "Parque da Cidade" ("City Park"), officially the "Parque da Cidade Sarah Kubitschek", is named after the wife of Brazilian president Juscelino Kubitschek, extends over four million square meters. It includes landscape works of Burle Marx, and wall tiles that decorate restrooms in the park designed by Athos Bulcão. Equipped with sports courts, a horse track, a racing kart track, skate tracks, playgrounds for children, bicycle tracks and trails for walks and jogging, the City Park attracts thousands of people everyday, specially on weekends. The park's main entrance is located in the Monumental Axis South, but there are secondary exits that lead to other areas in the city's south wing.

The Metropolitan Cathedral of Brasília

Designed by Oscar Niemeyer, it was inaugurated in 1970. Its shape is circular horizontally and structured around 16 curved pillars, forming a crown filled with futuristic and/or spatial stained-glass works in a triangular shape. The pillars evoke reversed praying hands that deconstruct the gothic traditional church window pattern, but conserves the triangular vaginal shape of the stained-glasses. The curves present in many of Niemeyer's works pay homage to the beautifully built bodies of Brazilian women.

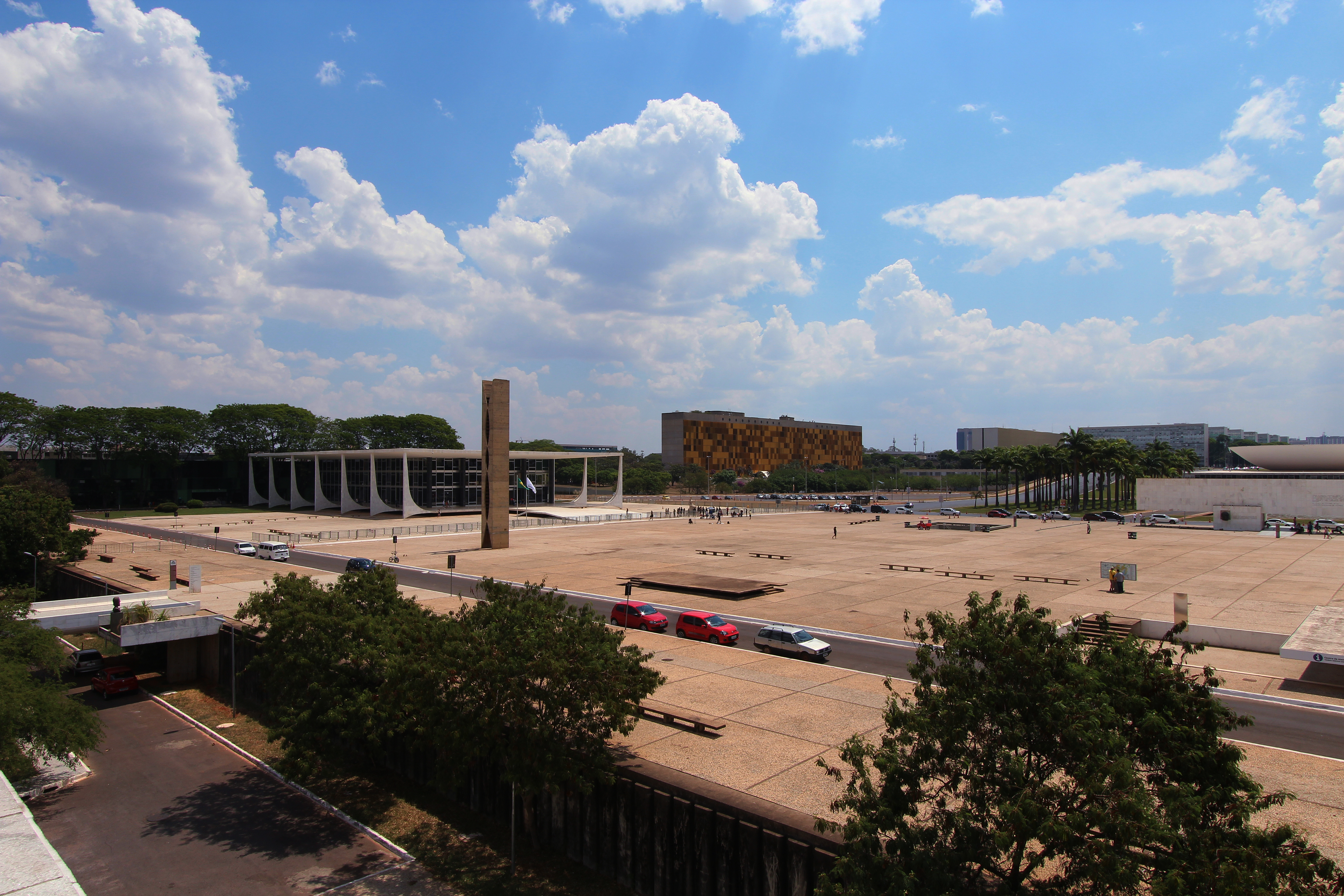
The Three Powers Square

The stained-glasses were designed by Marianne Peretti. Their disposition ensures natural lighting into the aisle, which was built below street level. Around the church, in the outside area, visitors can see Alfredo Ceschiatti's sculptures — the four evangelists — and inside, suspended angels. There are also paintings by Emiliano Di Cavalcanti, representing the stages of the Passion of Christ, and paintings by Athos Bulcão. The cathedral is located in the Eixo Monumental mall, at the entry to the Esplanada dos Ministérios, or Ministries Sector.

The "Three Powers Square"

Praça dos Três Poderes concentrates some of the most important and significant buildings in the work and career of Oscar Niemeyer — the Planalto Palace, headquarters of Brazilian Presidency; the National Congress, hosting the Chamber of Deputies and the Federal Senate; and the Higher Courts of Justice. The Square also hosts: the Panteão da Pátria (Pantheon of the Fatherland), the Lúcio Costa Space and three important sculptures — "Pombal", by Niemeyer; "Justice", by Alfredo Ceschiatti; and "Os Candangos", by Bruno Giorgi. In the central plaza, a giant Brazilian national flag 286 square meters (3,080 sq ft) is supported by a triangular black 100-meter (330 ft) and high pole. It is located at the end of the Esplanada dos Ministérios.

== Infrastructure ==
- Vehicles: 910,502 (March/2007)
- Mobile phones: 2.7 million (April/2007)
- Telephones: 884 thousand (April/2007)
- Cities: 31

== Economy ==
In addition to being the political center, the Federal District is also an important economic center, being the seventh federal unit with the highest gross domestic product (GDP) in Brazil (171.2 billion reais - 2012) and the highest GDP per capita in the country, 64,653 reais (2012).

The service sector is the largest component of GDP at 92.5%, followed by the industrial sector at 7.1%. Agriculture represents 0.4% of GDP (2004). Federal District exports: soybean 77.1% and gold 16.4% (2002). The Federal District's share of the Brazilian economy is 3.7% as of 2005.

== Transport ==
=== International Airport ===
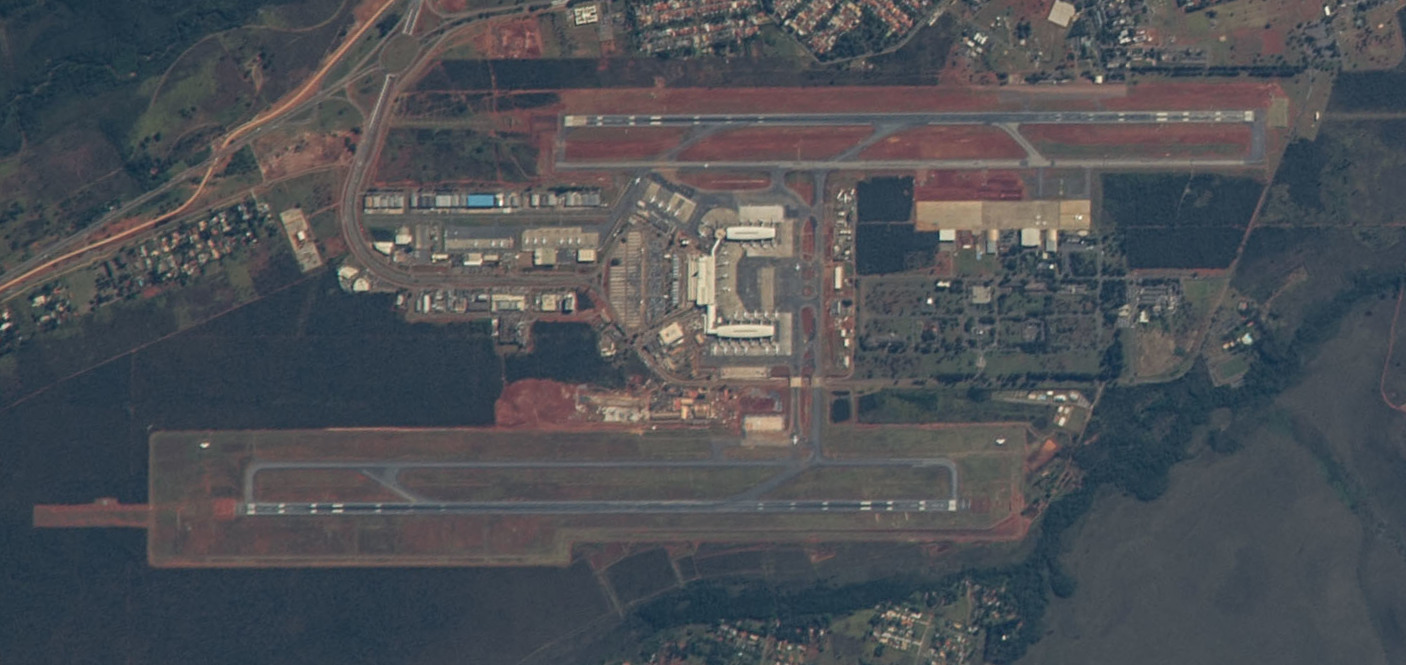
Brasília International Airport

Brasília International Airport is the third largest in Brazil in terms of passenger movement. Because of its strategic location it is considered a civil aviation hub for the rest of the country. This makes for a large number of takeoffs and landings and it is not unusual for flights to have to wait in the holding pattern to land. Following the airport's master plan, Infraero built a second runway in 2005. In 2003, the fourth phase of the passenger terminal expansion was completed. It raised its capacity to 7.4 million passengers a year. The third floor of the main building, with 12 thousand square meters, has a panoramic deck, a food court, shops, four movie theaters with total capacity of 500 people, and space for exhibitions. There are a total of 136 shop spots at the Brasília Airport.

=== Metro ===
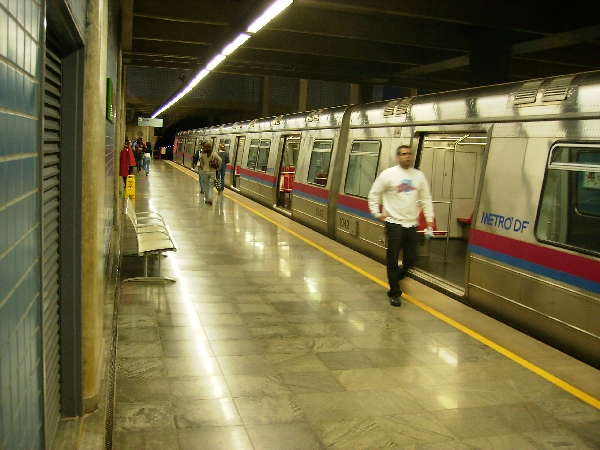
Federal District Metro

There is a rapid transit system, the Federal District Metro, serving some cities. It is operated by Companhia do Metropolitano do Distrito Federal (Metro Company of the Federal District) and was inaugurated in 2001. The system has 29 stations (24 in operation) on two lines, and operates from 06:00 to 23:30, Monday to Friday and from 07:00 to 19:00 on weekends. It serves the southern half of Brasília and the main cities to the west. Its main problem is the large distance between many of the stations caused by the low housing density for such a system. This makes it a small component in the Federal District transit system where a low-efficiency bus network is still predominant. Águas Claras is well served by the metro, making it one of the fastest growing areas and the most dense in the Federal District.

| Trains | 32 |
| Total extension | 42.38 km (26.33 miles) |
| Operational stations | 24 |
| Total stations | 29 |

The non-operational stations include stations under construction and mothballed stations (complete and under construction) awaiting higher density.

== Sports ==
The Federal District is home to two nationally-recognized football clubs: Brasiliense Futebol Clube (from Taguatinga) and Sociedade Esportiva do Gama (or simply Gama), both of which have played in the first division of the Campeonato Brasileiro Série A, the best result in their history being Brasiliense's runner-up finish in the 2002 edition of the Copa do Brasil. The main soccer stadiums are the Estádio Nacional de Brasília Mané Garrincha, the Estádio Elmo Serejo Farias (Serejão) and the Estádio Walmir Campelo Bezerra (Bezerrão). The Edson Arantes do Nascimento Stadium (Pelezão) was the city's first and main stadium at the time of its inauguration, but was abandoned and demolished in 2009.

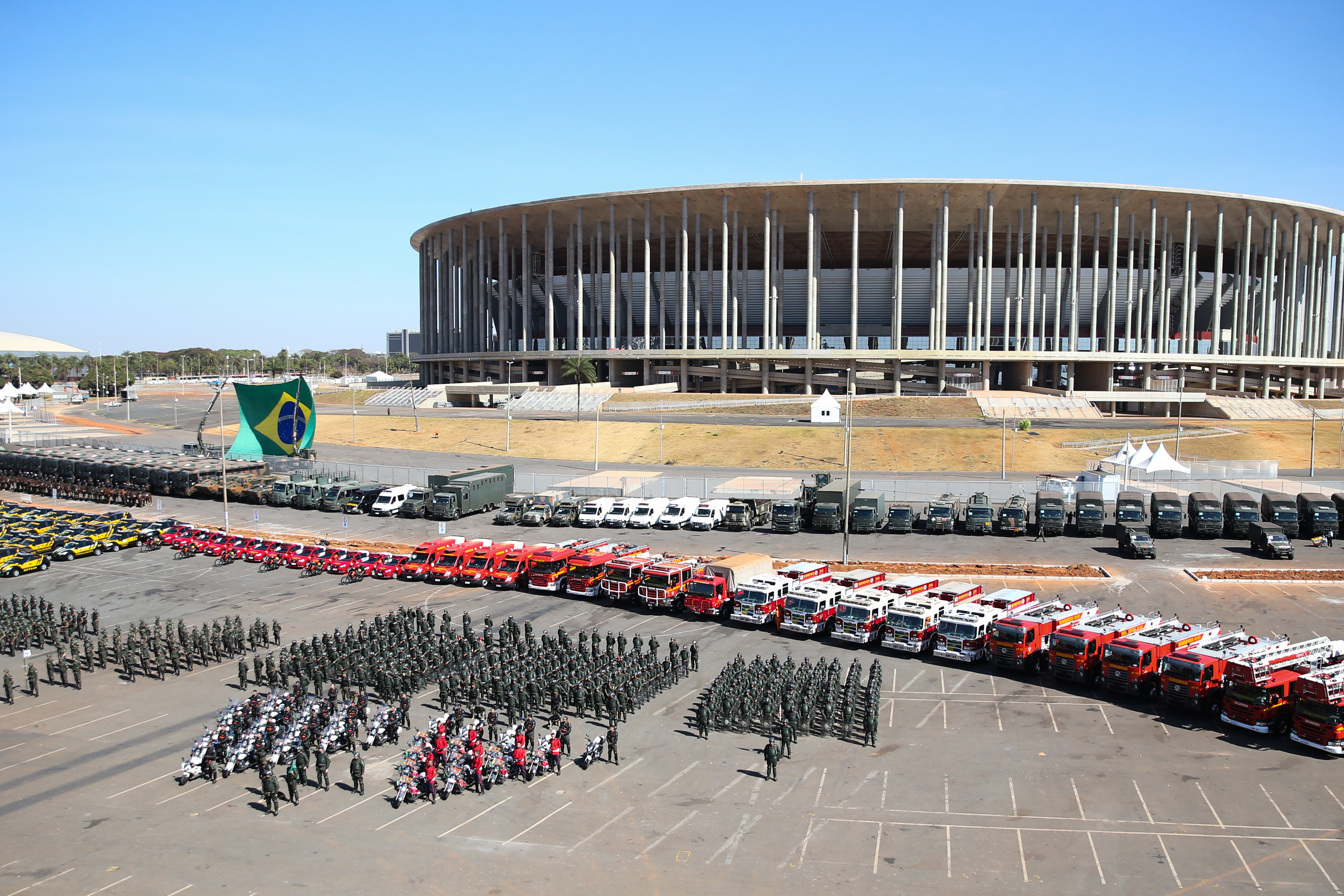
Brasília National Stadium

The Federal District is a departing point for the practice of free flying sports, a sport that may be practiced with hang gliding or paragliding wings. Practitioners of such sports say that because of the district's dry weather it offers strong thermal winds and great "cloud-streets" – which is also the name for a manoeuvre quite appreciated by practitioners. The district hosted the 14th Hang Gliding World Championship – one of the categories of free flying – in 2003. In August 2005, it hosted the 2nd stage of the Brazilian Hang Gliding Championship.

Brasília was one of the six host cities for the 2013 Confederations Cup matches and one of the twelve for the 2014 World Cup, whose matches took place at the Mané Garrincha National Stadium in Brasília. The stadium is located in the Ayrton Senna Multisport Complex (formerly the Sports Sector), which also includes the Nilson Nelson Sports Gymnasium, which has hosted matches for the men's and women's volleyball teams and the 2008 Futsal World Cup.

In the Federal District, the city of Brasília is the site of the Autódromo Internacional Nelson Piquet, which hosted a non-championship round of the 1974 Formula One Grand Prix season. An IndyCar race that was scheduled to occur at the circuit was cancelled at the last minute in 2015 due to financial problems. The track, which has been closed since 2015, is being renovated for the end of 2023 by the state-owned Banco de Brasília.

=== Domestic sports clubs ===
==== Association football ====
- Campeonato Brasileiro Série D (2)
  - Brasiliense FC
  - Ceilândia Esporte Clube

==== Basketball ====
- Novo Basquete Brasil
  - Brasília Basquete
  - Cerrado Basquete

=== Stadiums ===
==== Association football ====
- Bezerrão
- Estádio Nacional Mané Garrincha
- Serejão

==== Other ====
- Nilson Nelson Gymnasium

== Flag ==
The flag of the Federal District

The white background of the flag stands for peace, and gives the idea of infinity, or the vast Brazilian territory. The green and yellow colours in the middle refer to the most commonly used of the four colours of the national flag to represent Brazil. The four yellow arrows symbolize indigenous peoples of Brazil, whereas their pointing into the four cardinal directions of the compass stands for the centralized emanating political power of Brasília as the national capital. The yellow arrows also form a cross, which symbolizes both the Southern Cross, a constellation seen only in the Southern Hemisphere, and the Christian symbol of redemption brought by Pedro Álvares Cabral and under whose shadow the first Mass in Brazil was celebrated in 1500 in Bahia. The four arrows’ fletchings also form a lozenge in the middle as a nod to gold lozenge of the national flag symbolising Brazil's mineral riches.

The flag was created by the poet and herald Guilherme de Almeida, and was adopted by decree n.o 1090 on August 25, 1969.

== Voting rights ==
The Federal District has eight seats in the Chamber of Deputies and three in the Federal Senate. Its population also votes its governor and district deputies (which function as both state deputies and aldermen in the municipalities), but not regional administrators, which are appointed by the governor itself, respecting the government centrality of the Federal District.

== See also ==
- Administrative regions of the Federal District (Brazil)
