= Fercal =

- Administrative region
- Região Administrativa de Fercal; Administrative Region of Fercal
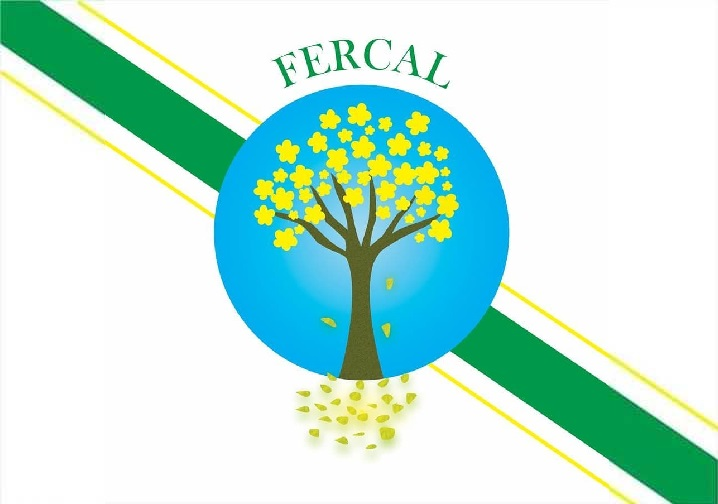
- Flag

- Location of Fercal in the Federal District
- Coordinates: 15°36′06″S 47°52′18″W
- Country: Brazil
- Region: Central-West
- State: Federal District
- Founded: September 11, 1956

Area
  - Total: 182 km^{2} (70 sq mi)

Population
  - Total: 8,536
  - Density: 46.9/km^{2} (121/sq mi)
- Time zone: UTC−3 (BRT)
- Area code: +55 61
- Website: www.fercal.df.gov.br

Fercal is an administrative region in the Federal District in Brazil. Fercal was founded on September 11, 1956, receiving the status of administrative region, according to Law 4745, of January 29, 2012.

== See also ==
- List of administrative regions of the Federal District
