= Flag of the Federal District (Brazil) =

Flag of the Brazilian Federal District

- Use: Civil and state flag
- Proportion: 7:10
- Adopted: August 25, 1969
- Design: A white flag representing peace, with the green stands for the vegetation of the region and Cross of Brasília
- Designed by: Guilherme de Almeida

The flag of the Federal District is the official flag of the Federal District. The flag was created by the poet Guilherme de Almeida, and officialized on August 25, 1969. The Cross of Brasília in the center symbolizes the indigenous heritage and the strength that hails in all directions.

The white background of the flag stands for peace, and gives the idea of infinity, or the vast Brazilian territory. The green and yellow colours in the middle refer to the most commonly used of the four colours of the national flag to represent Brazil. The four yellow arrows symbolize the native nations of Brazil, whereas their pointing into the four cardinal directions of the compass stands for the centralized emanating political power of Brasilia, as the capital of the country. The yellow arrows also form a cross, which symbolizes both the Southern Cross, a constellation seen only in the Southern Hemisphere and the Roman Catholic or Christian symbol of redemption brought by Pedro Álvares Cabral and under whose shadow the first Mass in Brazil was celebrated in 1500 in Bahia. With their feathers, the arrows form a lozenge in the middle, a reference to yellow lozenge of the national flag, that stands for Brazil's mineral riches.

7:10 Old Federal District flag (until 1969).

7:10 Flag of the governor of the Federal District.
