= Riacho Fundo =

- Administrative region
- Região Administrativa de Riacho Fundo; Administrative Region of Riacho Fundo
- Flag

- Location of Riacho Fundo in the Federal District

- Location of Riacho Fundo in Brazil
- Coordinates: 15°53′00″S 48°01′03″W
- Country: Brazil
- Region: Central-West
- State: Federal District
- Founded: March 13, 1990

Government
  - Regional administrator: Heitor Mitsuaki Kanegae

Area
  - Total: 56.02 km^{2} (21.63 sq mi)

Population (2013)
  - Total: 37,278
  - Density: 665.4/km^{2} (1,723/sq mi)
- Time zone: UTC−3 (BRT)
- Postal Code (CEP): 71800-000
- Area code: +55 61
- Website: www.riachofundo.df.gov.br

Riacho Fundo is an administrative region in the Federal District in Brazil. Riacho Fundo was founded on March 13, 1990, receiving the status of administrative region, according to Law 620, of December 15, 1993.

== See also ==
- List of administrative regions of the Federal District
