= Administrative region (Brazil) =

The Brazilian administrative region (Portuguese: região administrativa) are an administrative division of the Federal District, or of the municipality of Rio de Janeiro.

== Federal District ==
The Federal District is divided into 35 administrative regions.

== Rio de Janeiro ==
The municipality of Rio de Janeiro is divided into 33 administrative regions.

== See also ==
- Administrative regions of the Federal District (Brazil)
- List of Administrative Regions in Rio de Janeiro
- Region (administrative)
