= List of Federal District Metro (Brazil) stations =

This is a list of Federal District Metro (Brazil) stations, excluding abandoned, projected, planned stations, and those under construction.

== List of active stations ==
Lines		Name	Transfer	Opened
Orange	Green	Central		31 March 2001
Orange	Green	Galería		31 March 2001
Orange	Green	102 Sul		4 June 2009
Orange	Green	106 Sul Cine Brasília		16 September 2020
Orange	Green	108 Sul		12 April 2008
Orange	Green	110 Sul		16 September 2020
Orange	Green	112 Sul		9 may 2009
Orange	Green	114 Sul		31 March 2001
Orange	Green	Terminal Asa Sul		31 March 2001
Orange	Green	Shopping		31 March 2001
Orange	Green	Feira		31 March 2001
Orange	Green	Guará		10 May 2010
Orange	Green	Arniqueiras		6 February 2002
Orange	Green	Águas Claras	Separation between Orange and Green lines	10 May 2010
Orange		Taguatinga Sul		10 May 2010
Orange		Furnas		10 May 2010
Orange		Samambaia Sul		6 February 2002
Orange		Terminal Samambaia		10 May 2010
Green		Concessionárias		18 May 2004
Green		Estrada Parque		6 January 2020
Green		Praça do Relógio		6 February 2002
Green		Centro Metropolitano		November 2006
Green		Ceilândia Sul		November 2006
Green		Guariroba		16 April 2008
Green		Ceilândia Centro		16 April 2008
Green		Ceilândia Norte		16 April 2008
Green		Terminal Ceilândia		16 April 2008
