= 114 Sul station =

Federal District Metro station

114 Sul

General information
- Location: SQS 114, Asa Sul, Brasília; Federal District; Brazil
- Coordinates: 15°49′50.2″S 47°55′12.5″W
- System: Federal District Metro station
- Owner: Government of the Federal District (Brazil)
- Operator: Companhia do Metropolitano do Distrito Federal (Metrô DF)
- Lines: Orange line, Green line
- Platforms: 2
- Tracks: 2

Construction
- Structure type: Underground
- Accessible: Yes

Other information
- Station code: 114

History
- Opened: 31 March 2001; 25 years ago
Location

114 Sul is a Federal District Metro brazilian station on Orange and Green lines. It was opened on 31 March 2001 on the inaugural section of the line, from Central to Terminal Samambaia and Praça do Relógio. It is located between 112 Sul and Terminal Asa Sul.
