= Shopping station (Federal District Metro) =

Federal District Metro station

Shopping
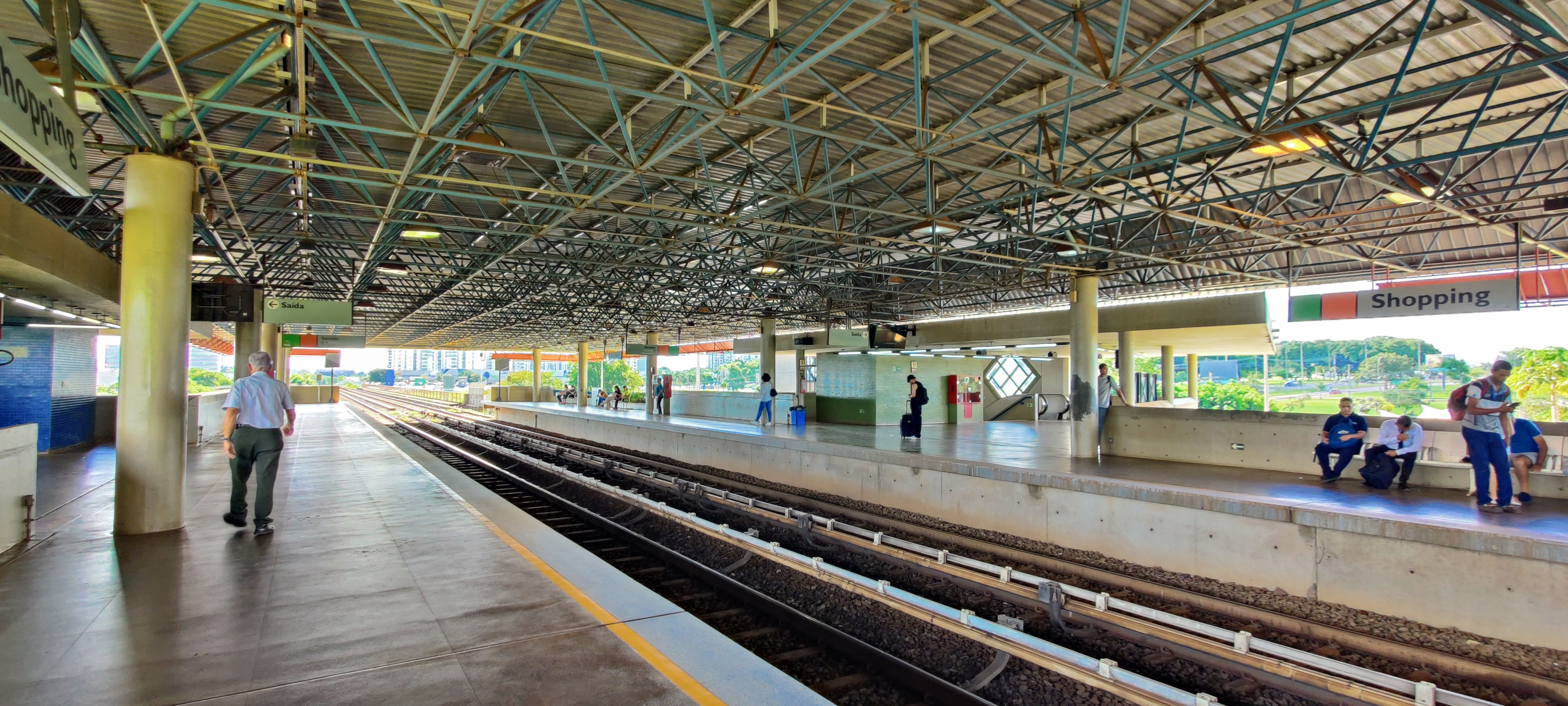

General information
- Location: SPO Trecho 3, Asa Sul, Brasília; Federal District; Brazil
- Coordinates: 15°49′56.7″S 47°57′02.3″W
- System: Federal District Metro station
- Owner: Government of the Federal District (Brazil)
- Operator: Companhia do Metropolitano do Distrito Federal (Metrô DF)
- Lines: Orange line, Green line
- Platforms: 2
- Tracks: 2

Construction
- Structure type: At-grade
- Accessible: Yes

Other information
- Station code: SHP

History
- Opened: 31 March 2001; 25 years ago
Location

Shopping (Station code: SHP) is a Federal District Metro station which is on the Orange and Green lines. It was opened on 31 March 2001 on the inaugural section of the line, from Central to Terminal Samambaia and Praça do Relógio. It is located between Terminal Asa Sul and Feira, near the Interstate Bus Terminal.
