= Arniqueiras station =

Federal District Metro station

Arniqueiras

General information
- Location: Boulevard Norte & Boulevard Sul; Águas Claras, Federal District; Brazil
- Coordinates: 15°50′12.2″S 48°01′01.4″W
- System: Federal District Metro station
- Owner: Government of the Federal District (Brazil)
- Operator: Companhia do Metropolitano do Distrito Federal (Metrô DF)
- Lines: Orange line, Green line
- Platforms: 2
- Tracks: 2

Construction
- Structure type: At-grade
- Accessible: Yes

Other information
- Station code: ARN

History
- Opened: 5 February 2002; 24 years ago
Location

Arniqueiras (Station code: ARN) is a Federal District Metro brazilian station on Orange and Green lines. It was opened on 5 February 2002 and added to the already operating section of the line, from Central to Terminal Samambaia and Ceilândia Sul. It is located between Guará and Águas Claras.
