= Feira station =

Federal District Metro station

Feira
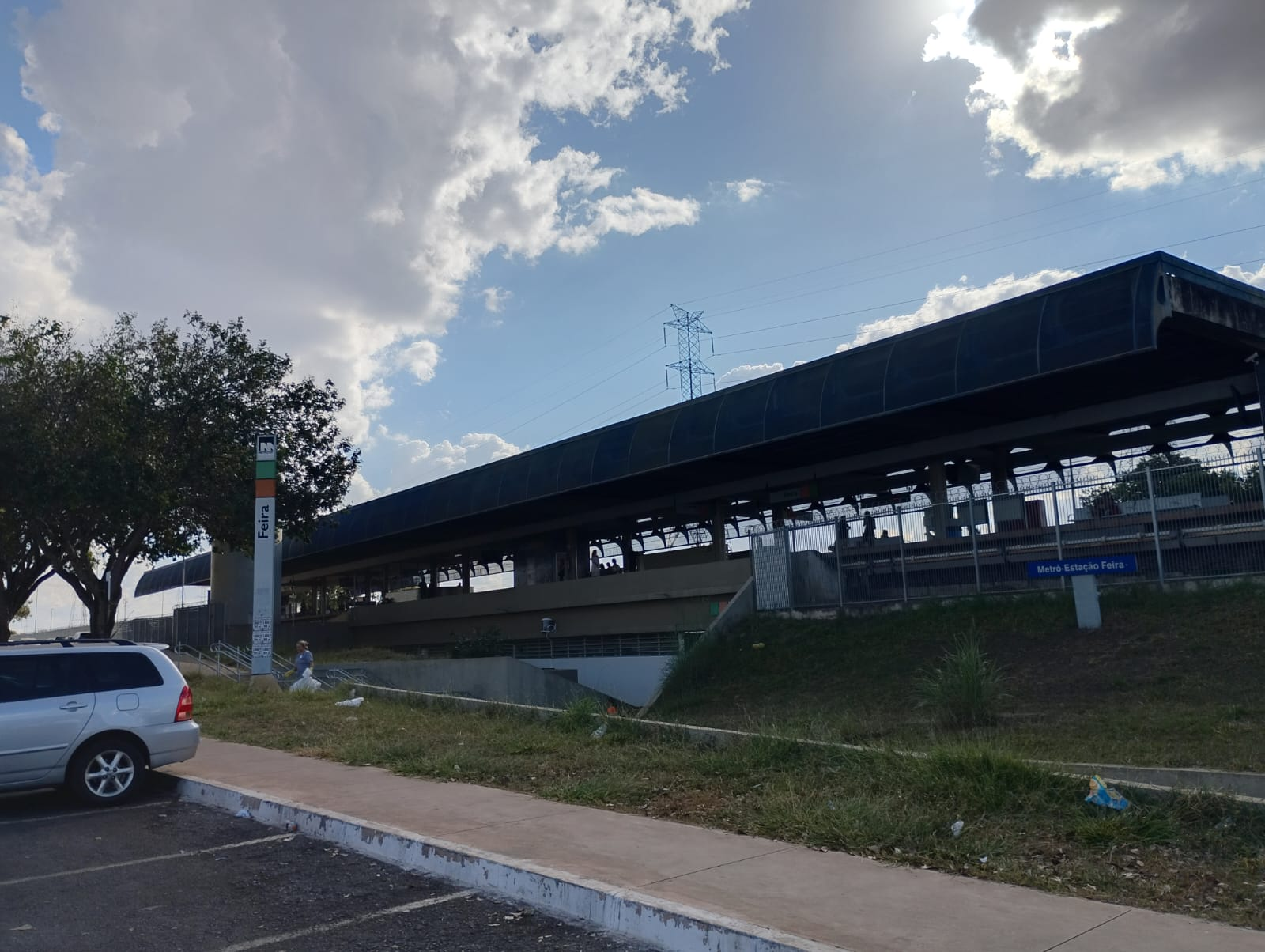
- A view of the station from the outside

General information
- Location: Guará II QE 25 - Guará; Federal District; Brazil
- Coordinates: 15°49′23.1″S 47°58′30″W
- System: Federal District Metro station
- Owner: Government of the Federal District (Brazil)
- Operator: Companhia do Metropolitano do Distrito Federal (Metrô DF)
- Lines: Orange line, Green line
- Platforms: 1
- Tracks: 2

Construction
- Structure type: At-grade
- Accessible: Yes

Other information
- Station code: FEI

History
- Opened: 31 March 2001; 25 years ago
Location

Feira or Feira do Guará (Station code: FEI) is a Federal District Metro Brazilian station on Orange and Green lines. It was opened on 31 March 2001 on the inaugural section of the line, from Central to Terminal Samambaia and Praça do Relógio. It is located between Shopping and Guará.
