= Taguatinga Sul station =

Federal District Metro station

Taguatinga Sul

General information
- Location: Setor D Sul Qsd 55, Taguatinga, DF; Federal District; Brazil
- Coordinates: 15°51′06.7″S 48°02′31.1″W
- System: Federal District Metro station
- Owner: Government of the Federal District (Brazil)
- Operator: Companhia do Metropolitano do Distrito Federal (Metrô DF)
- Line: Orange line
- Platforms: 1
- Tracks: 2

Construction
- Structure type: At-grade
- Accessible: Yes

Other information
- Station code: TAS

History
- Opened: 31 March 2001
Location

Taguatinga Sul is a Federal District Metro brazilian station on Orange line. It was opened on 31 March 2001 on the inaugural section of the line, from Central to Terminal Samambaia. It is located between Águas Claras and Furnas.
