= 112 Sul station =

Federal District Metro station

112 Sul

General information
- Location: SQS 112, Asa Sul, Brasília; Federal District; Brazil
- Coordinates: 15°49′36.2″S 47°54′53″W
- System: Federal District Metro station
- Owner: Government of the Federal District (Brazil)
- Operator: Companhia do Metropolitano do Distrito Federal (Metrô DF)
- Lines: Orange line, Green line
- Platforms: 2
- Tracks: 2

Construction
- Structure type: Underground
- Accessible: Yes

Other information
- Station code: 112

History
- Opened: 9 May 2008; 18 years ago
Location

112 Sul is a Federal District Metro station on Orange and Green lines. It was opened on 9 May 2009 and added to the already operating section of the line, from Central to Terminal Samambaia and Terminal Ceilândia. It is located between 110 Sul and 114 Sul.
