= Águas Claras station =

Federal District Metro station

Águas Claras
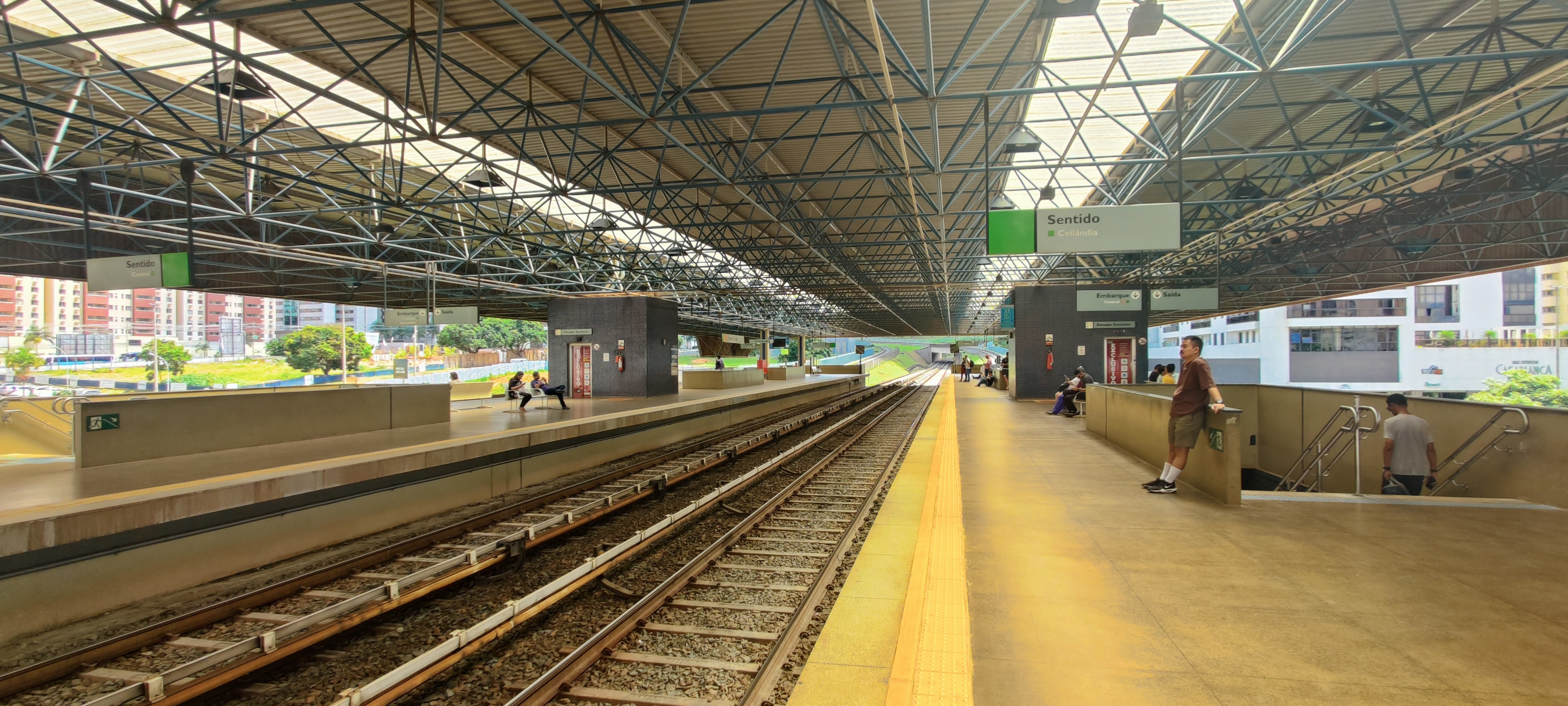
- Águas Claras metro station (2024)

General information
- Location: Boulevard Norte & Boulevard Sul; Águas Claras, DF; Brazil
- Coordinates: 15°50′24.1″S 48°01′41.5″W
- System: Federal District Metro station
- Owner: Government of the Federal District (Brazil)
- Operator: Companhia do Metropolitano do Distrito Federal (Metrô DF)
- Lines: Orange line, Green line
- Platforms: 2
- Tracks: 4

Construction
- Structure type: At-grade
- Accessible: Yes

Other information
- Station code: CLA

History
- Opened: 31 March 2001
Location

Águas Claras is a Federal District Metro Brazilian station on Orange and Green lines. It was opened on 31 March 2001 on the inaugural section of the line, from Central to Terminal Samambaia and Praça do Relógio. This is the westernmost joint station of Orange and Green lines. The adjacent stations are Arniqueiras (Orange and Green lines), Taguatinga Sul (Orange line), and Concessionárias (Green line).
