= Guará station =

Federal District Metro station

Guará
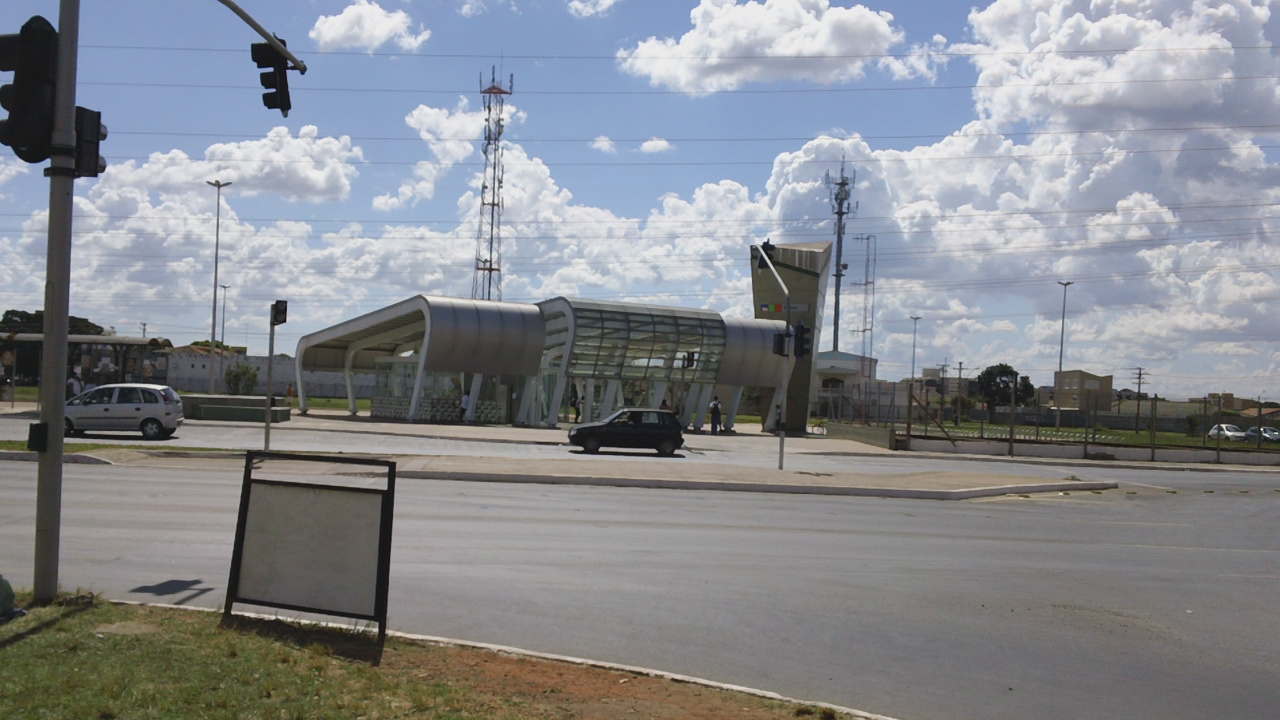
- Entrance to the station

General information
- Location: Sria II Qe 23, Guará; Federal District; Brazil
- Coordinates: 15°49′35.7″S 47°58′59.7″W
- System: Federal District Metro station
- Owner: Government of the Federal District (Brazil)
- Operator: Companhia do Metropolitano do Distrito Federal (Metrô DF)
- Lines: Orange line, Green line
- Platforms: 2
- Tracks: 2

Construction
- Structure type: Underground
- Accessible: Yes

Other information
- Station code: GUA

History
- Opened: 10 May 2010
Location

Guará (Station code: GUA) is a Federal District Metro station operating on the Orange and Green lines. It was opened on 10 May 2010 and added to the already operating section of the line, from Central to Terminal Samambaia and Terminal Ceilândia. It is located between Feira and Arniqueiras.
