= 102 Sul station =

Federal District Metro station

102 Sul
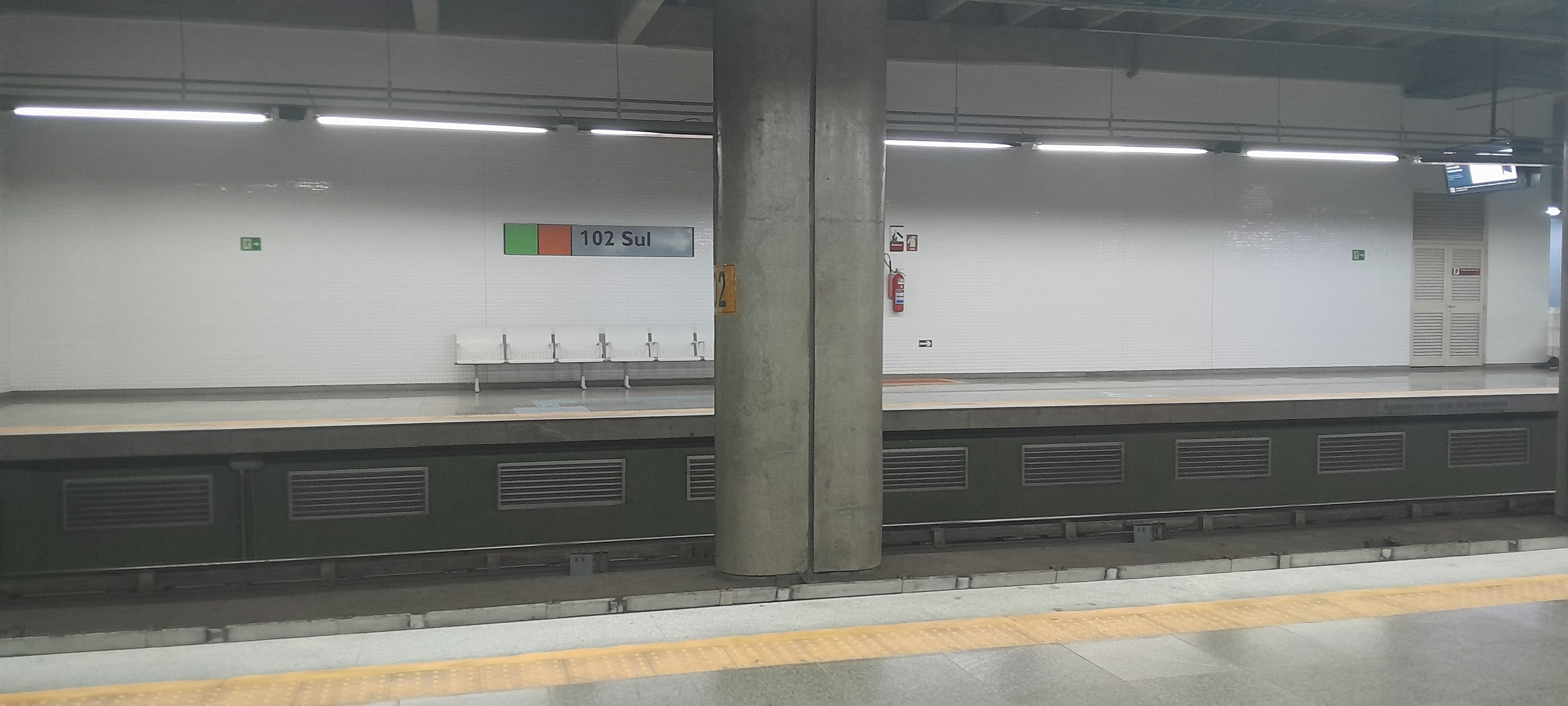
- The interior of the station

General information
- Location: SQS 102/CL5 102, Asa Sul, Brasília; Federal District; Brazil
- Coordinates: 15°48′20.5″S 47°53′21.6″W
- System: Federal District Metro station
- Owner: Government of the Federal District (Brazil)
- Operator: Companhia do Metropolitano do Distrito Federal (Metrô DF)
- Lines: Orange line, Green line
- Platforms: 2
- Tracks: 2

Construction
- Structure type: Underground
- Accessible: Yes

Other information
- Station code: 102

History
- Opened: 4 June 2009
Location

102 Sul is a Federal District Metro station which operates both the Orange and Green lines. It was opened on 4 June 2009 and added to the already operating section of the line, from Central to Terminal Samambaia and Terminal Ceilândia. It is located between Galería and 106 Sul Cine Brasília, in the city's South Wing.
