= Furnas station =

Federal District Metro station

Furnas

General information
- Location: QR 122, Conjunto 10 - Samambaia Sul; Samambaia, Federal District; Brazil
- Coordinates: 15°51′54″S 48°03′35.5″W
- System: Federal District Metro station
- Owner: Government of the Federal District (Brazil)
- Operator: Companhia do Metropolitano do Distrito Federal (Metrô DF)
- Line: Orange line
- Platforms: 1
- Tracks: 2

Construction
- Structure type: At-grade
- Accessible: Yes

Other information
- Station code: FUR

History
- Opened: 31 March 2001
Location

Furnas is a Federal District Metro brazilian station on Orange line. It opened on 31 March 2001 on the inaugural section of the line, from Central to Terminal Samambaia. It is located between Taguatinga Sul and Samambaia Sul.
