= 106 Sul Cine Brasília station =

Federal District Metro station

106 Sul
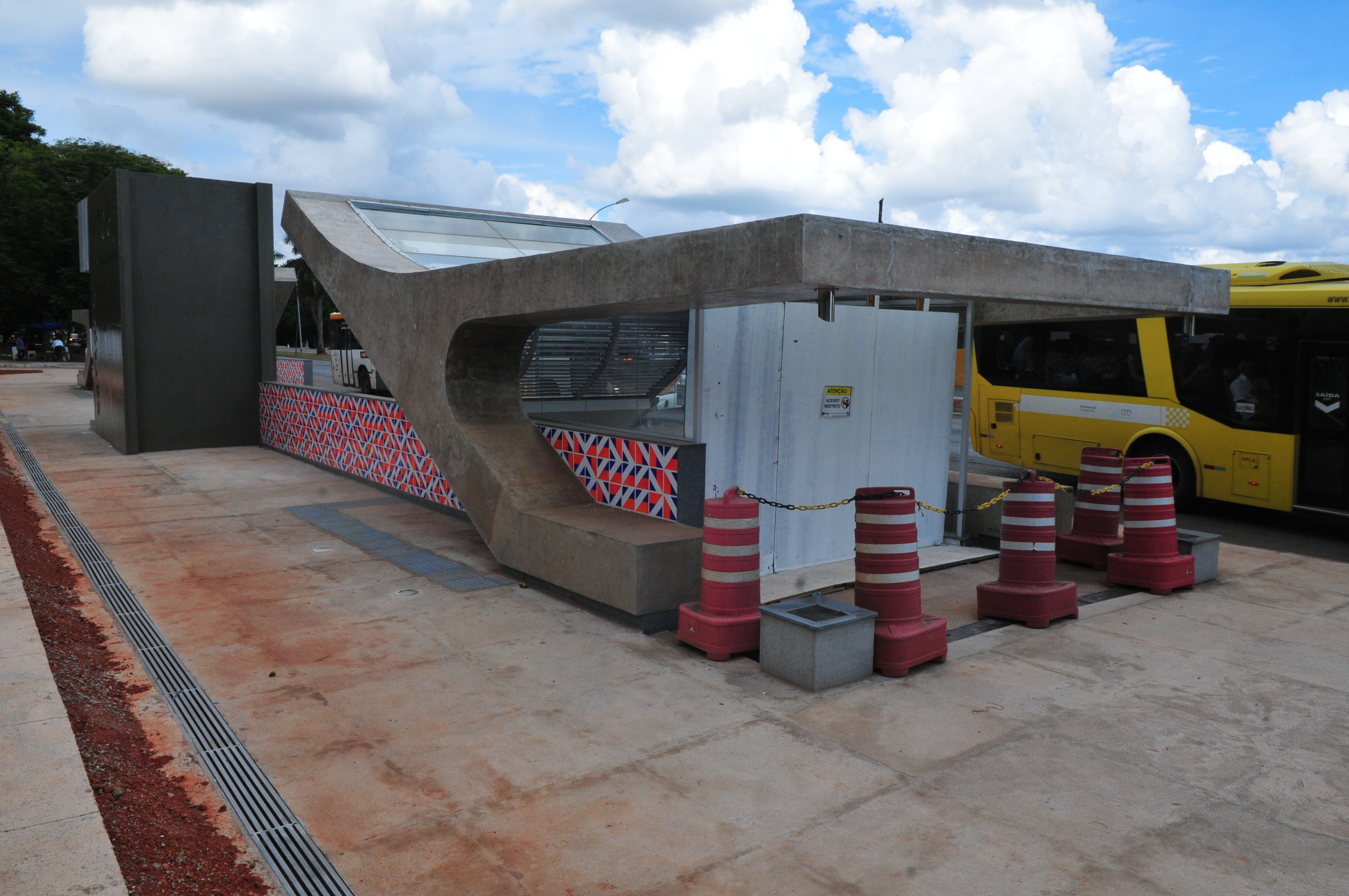
- Entrance to the station

General information
- Location: DF-002, Asa Sul, Brasília; Brazil
- Coordinates: 15°48′54.0″S 47°53′55.4″W
- System: Federal District Metro station
- Owner: Government of the Federal District (Brazil)
- Operator: Companhia do Metropolitano do Distrito Federal (Metrô DF)
- Lines: Orange line, Green line
- Platforms: 2
- Tracks: 2

Construction
- Structure type: Underground
- Accessible: Yes

Other information
- Station code: 106

History
- Opened: 16 September 2020; 5 years ago

Passengers
- 3,000/business day (estimated)
Location

106 Sul Cine Brasília is a Federal District Metro station on both the Orange and Green lines. It was opened on 16 September 2020 and added to the already operating section of the line, from Central to Terminal Samambaia and Terminal Ceilândia. It is located between 102 Sul and 108 Sul near the Cine Brasília, where the annual Brasília Film Festival takes place.

On August 29, 2017, the Companhia do Metropolitano do Distrito Federal made public the bidding process for the completion of the station's works. The contract had an estimated value of R$21.282 million and initially had a deadline of 18 months for completion from the signing of the contract. The station was inaugurated on September 17, 2020, along with the 110 Sul station.
