= Galería station =

Federal District Metro station

Galería
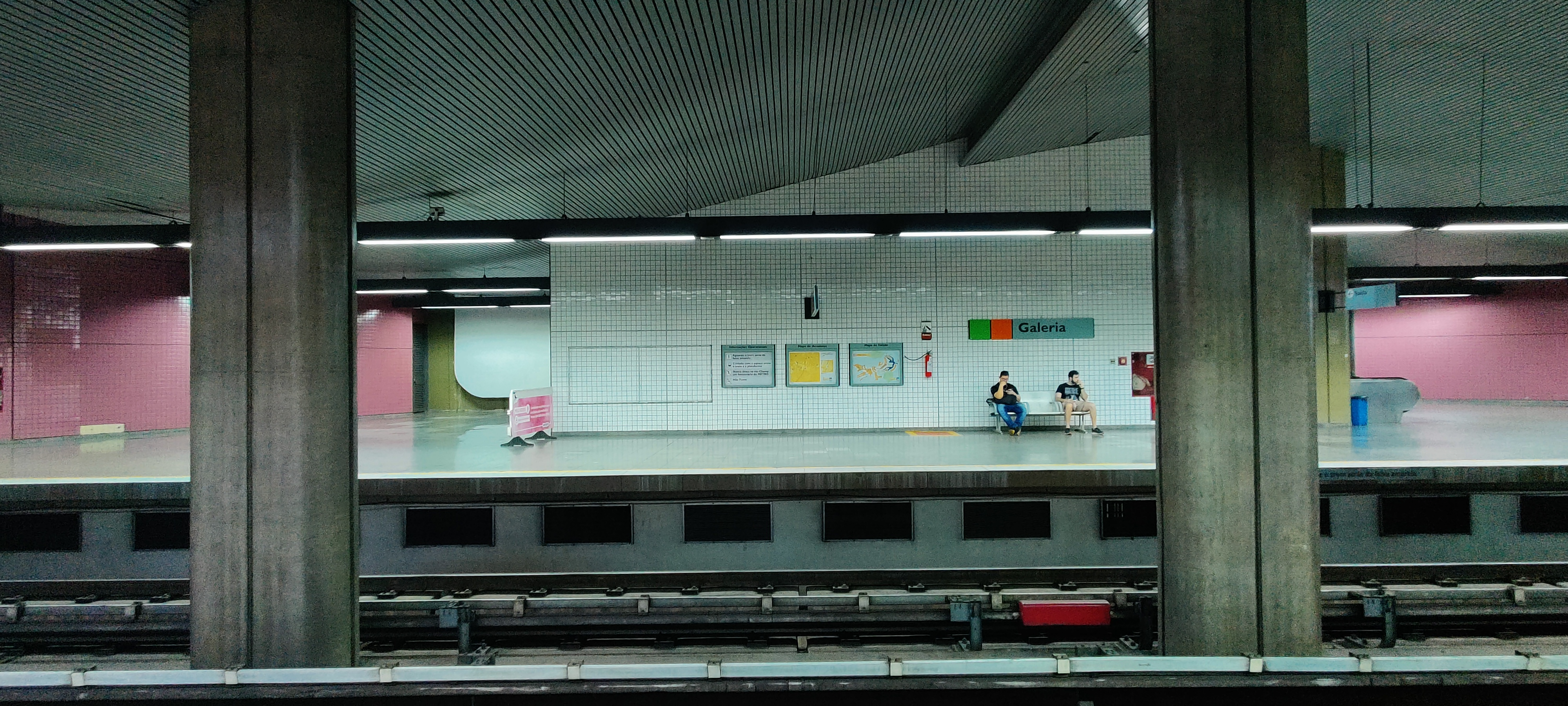
- The interior of the station

General information
- Location: South Commercial Sector Q. 1 - Asa Sul, Brasília; Federal District; Brazil
- Coordinates: 15°47′57″S 47°53′09″W
- System: Federal District Metro station
- Owner: Government of the Federal District (Brazil)
- Operator: Companhia do Metropolitano do Distrito Federal (Metrô DF)
- Lines: Orange line, Green line
- Platforms: 2
- Tracks: 2

Construction
- Structure type: Underground

Other information
- Station code: GAL

History
- Opened: 31 March 2001; 25 years ago
Location

Galería (Station code: GAL) is a Federal District Metro station on the Orange and Green lines. It was opened on 31 March 2001 as part of the inaugural section of the line, from Central to Terminal Samambaia and Praça do Relógio. It is located between Central and 102 Sul in Brasília's South Wing (Asa Sul), Brazil. The station got its name because it is located under the Galeria dos Estados, one of the main shopping areas in central Brasília, and also serves as a pedestrian crossing.

== Location ==
As well as the Galeria dos Estados, there are a number of sectors in the immediate vicinity, such as the SBS (South Banking Sector), the SCS (South Commercial Sector) and the SHS (South Hospital Sector).

== Access ==
In addition to stairs and escalators, the station can also be accessed by elevator, making it easier for people with disabilities to get around.

The South Access is the closest to the ticket counters and platforms, but is far from the Galeria dos Estados. In addition, there are several accesses near the South Commercial Sector.

== Lost and found ==
This station is home to the Central Lost and Found Objects Office, where objects found in any of the stations or trains of the Federal District Metro are kept for up to 30 days. After this period, the objects are donated to the Brasília Regional Administration while the documents are sent to the Correios.
