= 108 Sul station =

Federal District Metro station

108 Sul
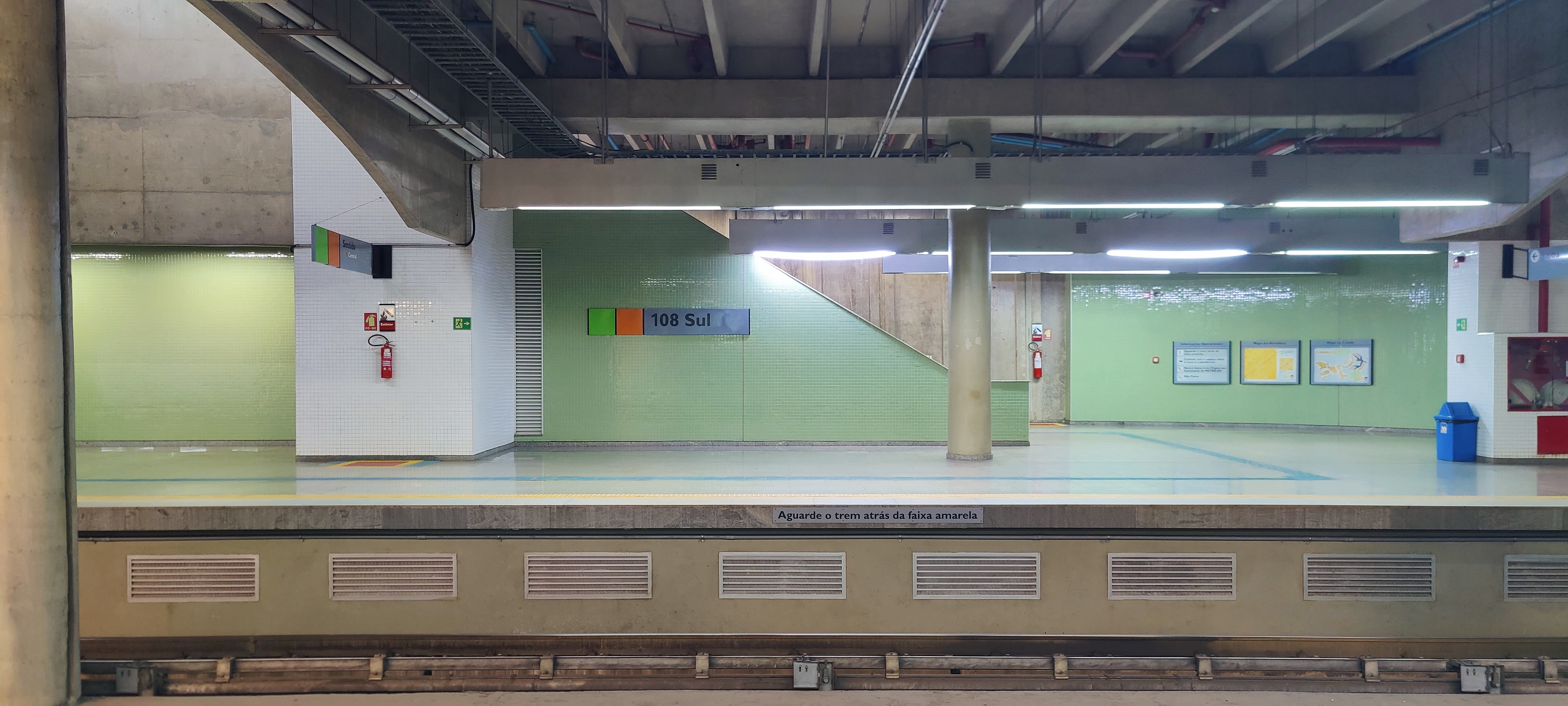
- The underground interior of the station

General information
- Location: SHCS - Asa Sul, Brasília; Federal District; Brazil
- Coordinates: 15°49′08.6″S 47°54′15.1″W
- System: Federal District Metro station
- Owner: Government of the Federal District (Brazil)
- Operator: Companhia do Metropolitano do Distrito Federal (Metrô DF)
- Lines: Orange line, Green line
- Platforms: 2
- Tracks: 2

Construction
- Structure type: Underground
- Accessible: Yes

Other information
- Station code: 108

History
- Opened: 12 April 2008; 18 years ago
Location

108 Sul is a Federal District Metro station on the Orange and Green lines. It was opened on 12 April 2008 and added to the already operating section of the line, from Central to Terminal Samambaia and Ceilândia Sul. It is located between 106 Sul Cine Brasília and 110 Sul, in Brasília's South Wing.
