= Estrada Parque station =

Federal District Metro station

Estrada Parque
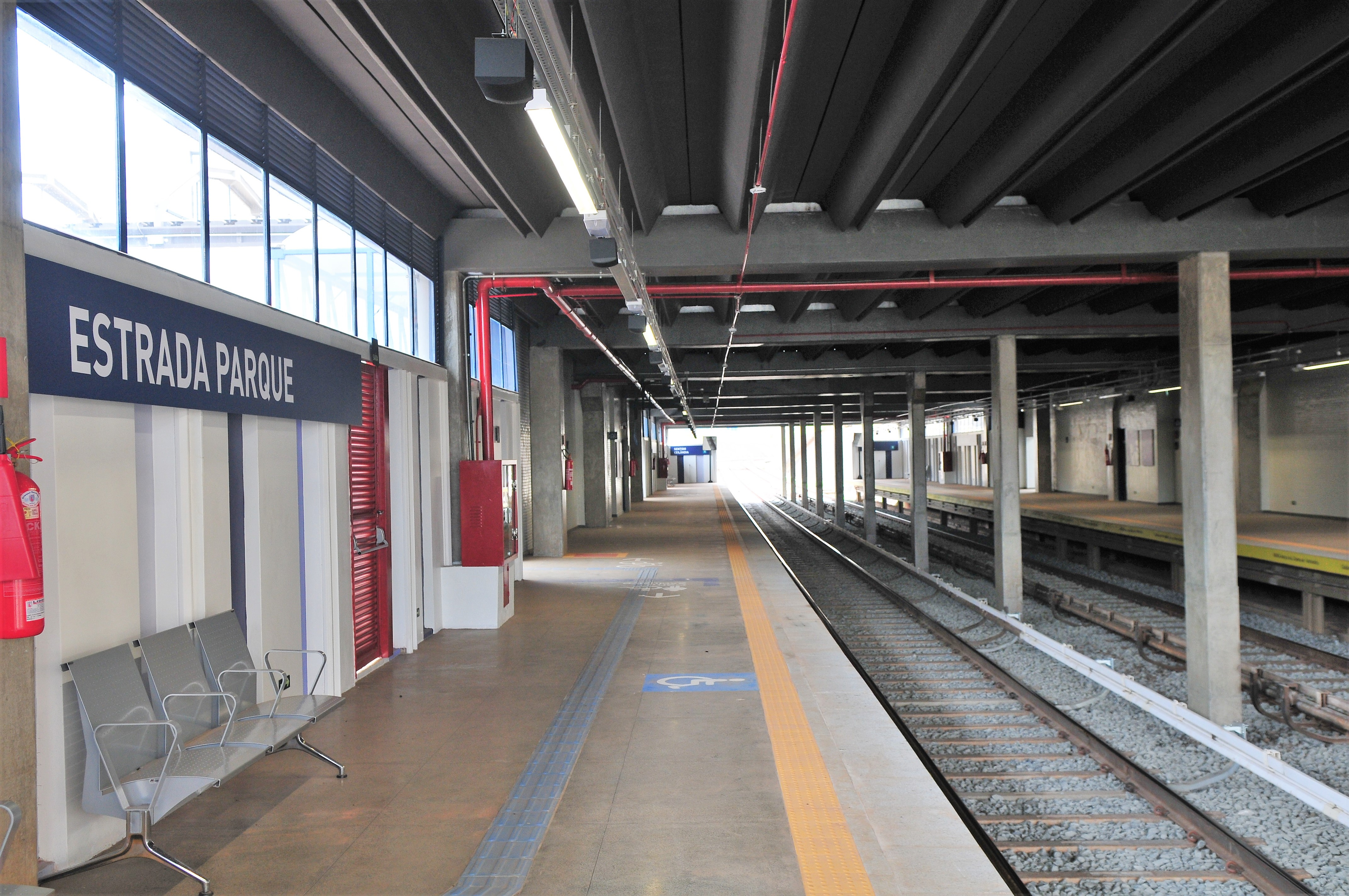

General information
- Location: Águas Claras, DF; Brazil
- Coordinates: 15°49′56.6″S 48°02′43″W
- System: Federal District Metro station
- Owner: Government of the Federal District (Brazil)
- Operator: Companhia do Metropolitano do Distrito Federal (Metrô DF)
- Line: Green line
- Platforms: 2
- Tracks: 2

Construction
- Structure type: At-grade
- Accessible: Yes

Other information
- Station code: EPQ

History
- Opened: 6 January 2020
Location

Estrada Parque is a Federal District Metro brazilian station on Green line. It was opened on 6 January 2020 on the already operating section of the line, from Central to Terminal Ceilândia. It is located between Concessionárias and Praça do Relógio.
