= 110 Sul station =

Federal District Metro station

110 Sul
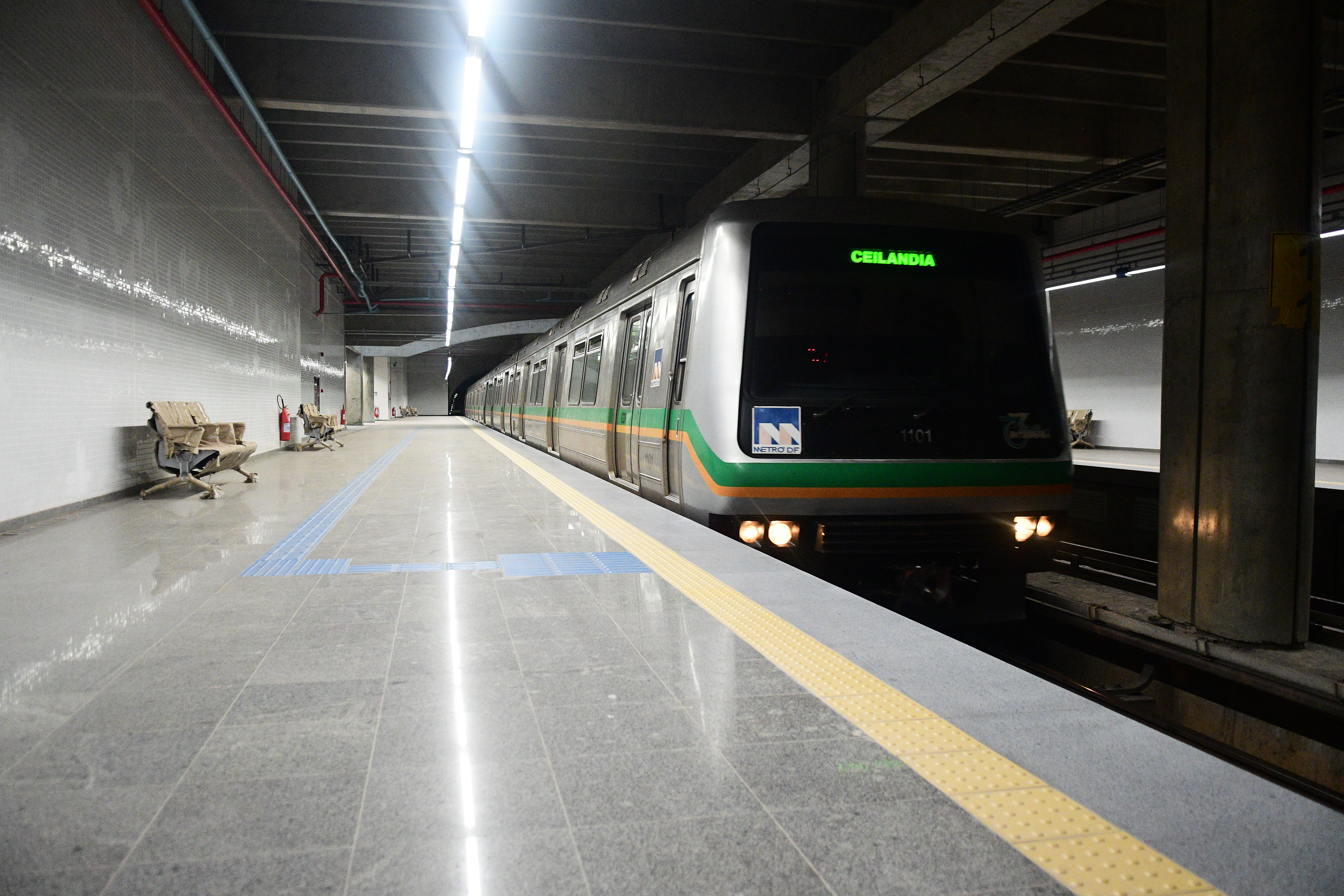
- Station photo

General information
- Location: SQS 110, Asa Sul, Brasília; Federal District; Brazil
- Coordinates: 15°49′22.6″S 47°54′33.7″W
- System: Federal District Metro station
- Owner: Government of the Federal District (Brazil)
- Operator: Companhia do Metropolitano do Distrito Federal (Metrô DF)
- Lines: Orange line, Green line
- Platforms: 2
- Tracks: 2

Construction
- Structure type: Underground
- Accessible: Yes

Other information
- Station code: 110

History
- Opened: 16 September 2020

Passengers
- 3,000/business day (estimated)
Location

110 Sul is a Federal District Metro station operating on the Orange and Green lines. It was opened on 16 September 2020, alongside 106 Sul Cine Brasília station, and added to the already operating section of the line, beginning in Central and ending at Terminal Samambaia and Terminal Ceilândia. It is located between 108 Sul and 112 Sul.
