= Concessionárias station =

Federal District Metro station

Concessionárias
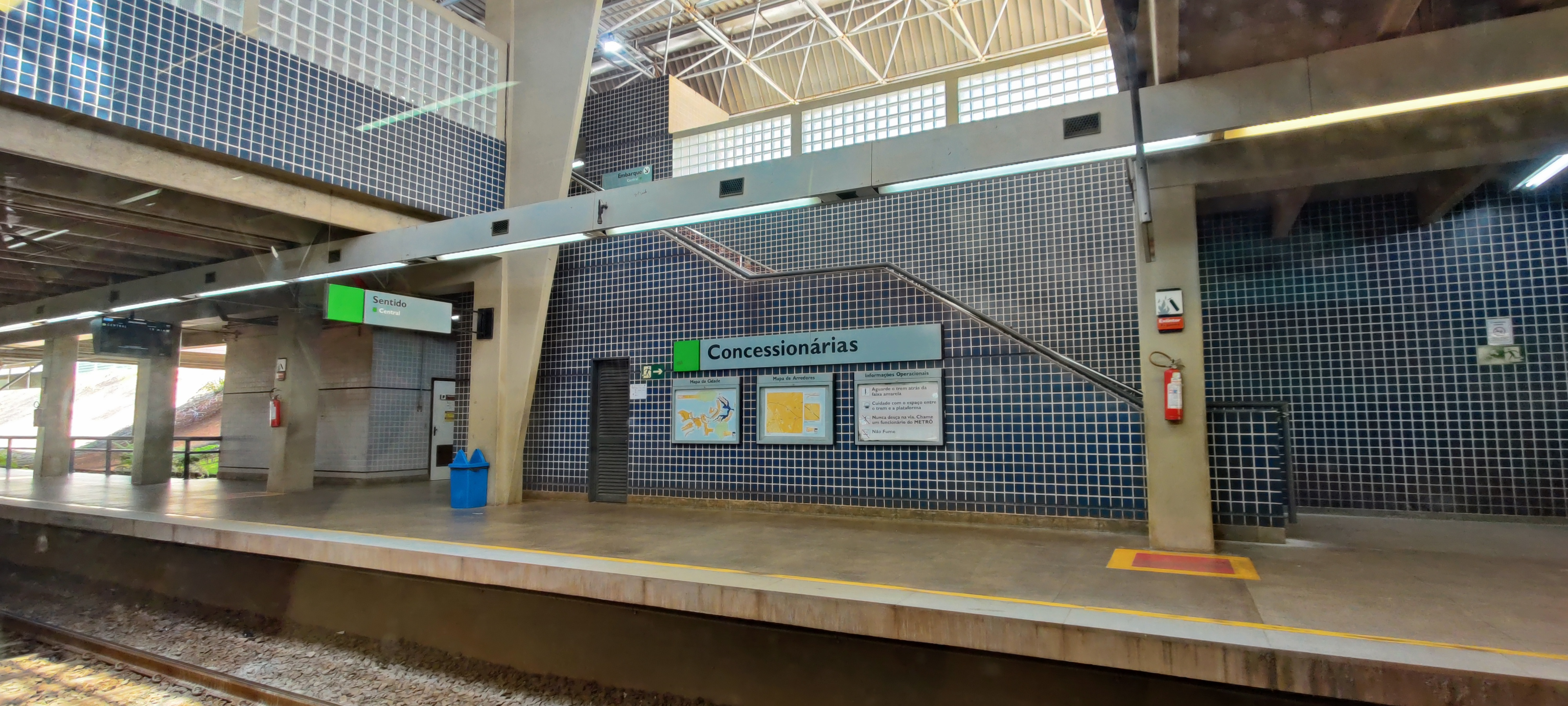
- The interior of the station

General information
- Location: Boulevard Norte & Boulevard Sul; Águas Claras, DF; Brazil
- Coordinates: 15°50′06.5″S 48°02′19.1″W
- System: Federal District Metro station
- Owner: Government of the Federal District (Brazil)
- Operator: Companhia do Metropolitano do Distrito Federal (Metrô DF)
- Line: Green line
- Platforms: 2
- Tracks: 2

Construction
- Structure type: At-grade
- Accessible: Yes

Other information
- Station code: CON

History
- Opened: 18 May 2004
Location

Concessionárias is a Federal District Metro station on the Green line. It was opened on 18 May 2004 on the already operating section of the line, from Central to Praça do Relógio. The adjacent stations are Águas Claras and Estrada Parque.
