= Terminal Asa Sul station =

Federal District Metro station

Terminal Asa Sul

General information
- Location: SPO, Brasília; Federal District; Brazil
- Coordinates: 15°50′13.5″S 47°55′57.7″W
- System: Federal District Metro station
- Owner: Government of the Federal District (Brazil)
- Operator: Companhia do Metropolitano do Distrito Federal (Metrô DF)
- Lines: Orange line, Green line
- Platforms: 2
- Tracks: 2

Construction
- Structure type: At-grade
- Accessible: Yes

Other information
- Station code: ASA

History
- Opened: 31 March 2001; 25 years ago
Location

Terminal Asa Sul is a Federal District Metro brazilian station on Orange and Green lines. It was opened on 31 March 2001 on the inaugural section of the line, from Central to Terminal Samambaia and Praça do Relógio. It is located between 114 Sul and Shopping.
