= Guariroba station =

Federal District Metro station

Guariroba

General information
- Location: QNN 14, Conjunto O - Guariroba; Ceilândia, DF; Brazil
- Coordinates: 15°49′50.2″S 48°06′26.2″W
- System: Federal District Metro station
- Owner: Government of the Federal District (Brazil)
- Operator: Companhia do Metropolitano do Distrito Federal (Metrô DF)
- Line: Green line
- Platforms: 1
- Tracks: 2

Construction
- Structure type: At-grade
- Accessible: Yes

Other information
- Station code: GBA

History
- Opened: 16 April 2008
Location

Guariroba is a Federal District Metro brazilian station on Green line. It was opened on 16 April 2008 as part of the section between Ceilândia Sul and Terminal Ceilândia. The station is located between Ceilândia Sul and Ceilândia Centro.
