= Ceilândia Centro station =

Federal District Metro station

Ceilândia Centro
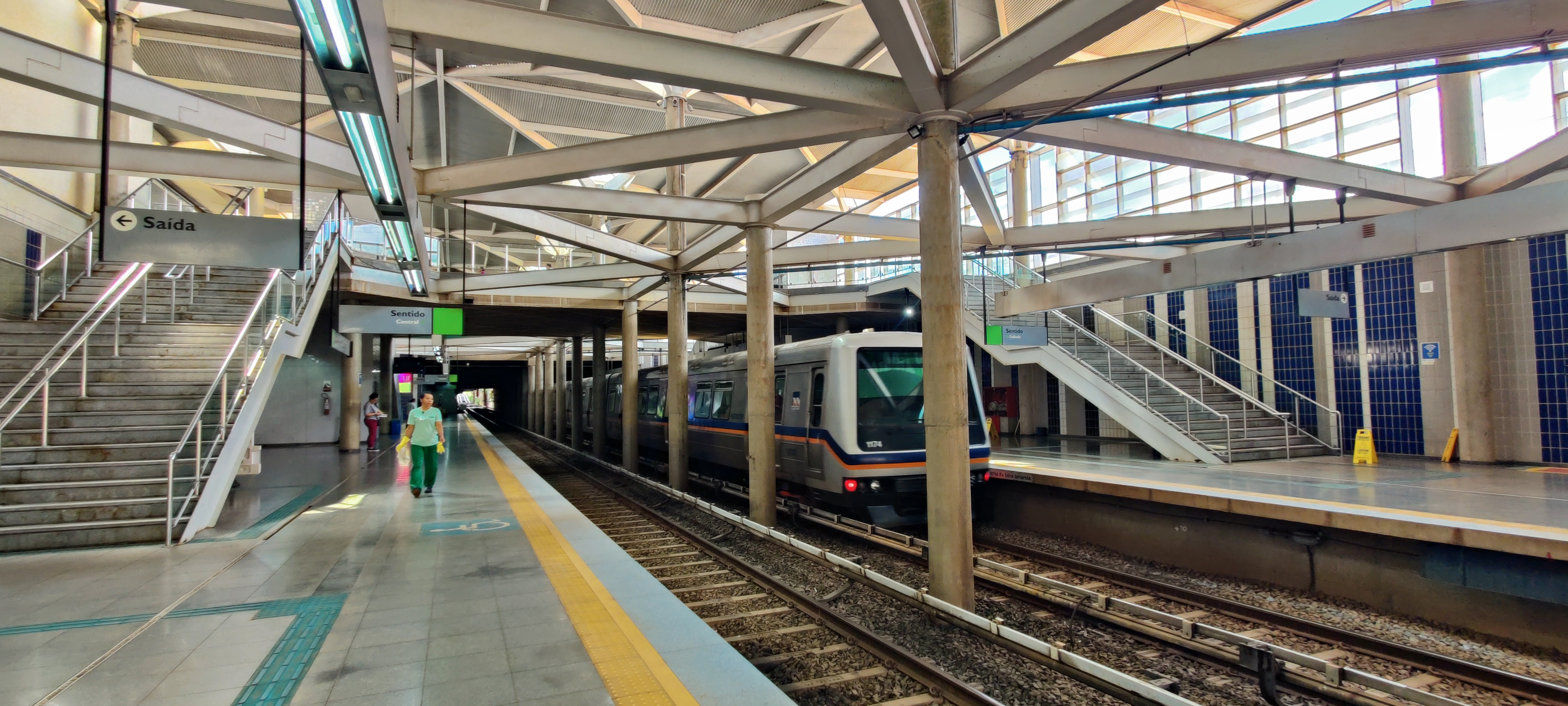
- The interior of the station

General information
- Location: Setor N Cnn 2 Bl A x Setor N Cnn 2 Conjunto H Ceilândia, DF; Brazil
- Coordinates: 15°49′20.3″S 48°06′42.7″W
- System: Federal District Metro station
- Owner: Government of the Federal District (Brazil)
- Operator: Companhia do Metropolitano do Distrito Federal (Metrô DF)
- Line: Green line
- Platforms: 2
- Tracks: 2

Construction
- Structure type: Underground
- Accessible: Yes

Other information
- Station code: CEC

History
- Opened: 16 April 2008; 18 years ago
Location

Ceilândia Centro (Station code: CEC) is a Federal District Metro station on the Green line. It was opened on 16 April 2008, as part of the section between Ceilândia Sul and Terminal Ceilândia. The station is located between Guariroba and Ceilândia Norte.

== Gallery ==
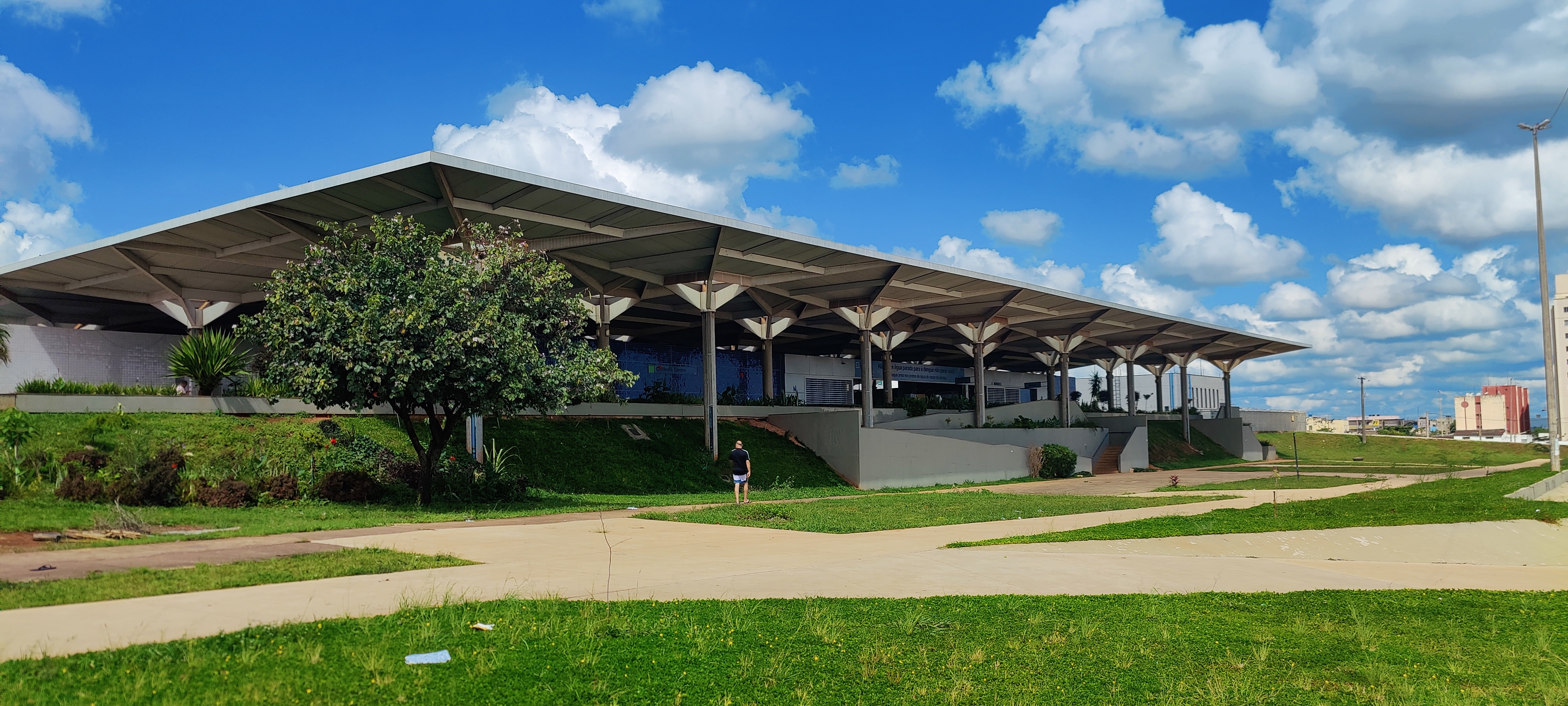
Station exterior

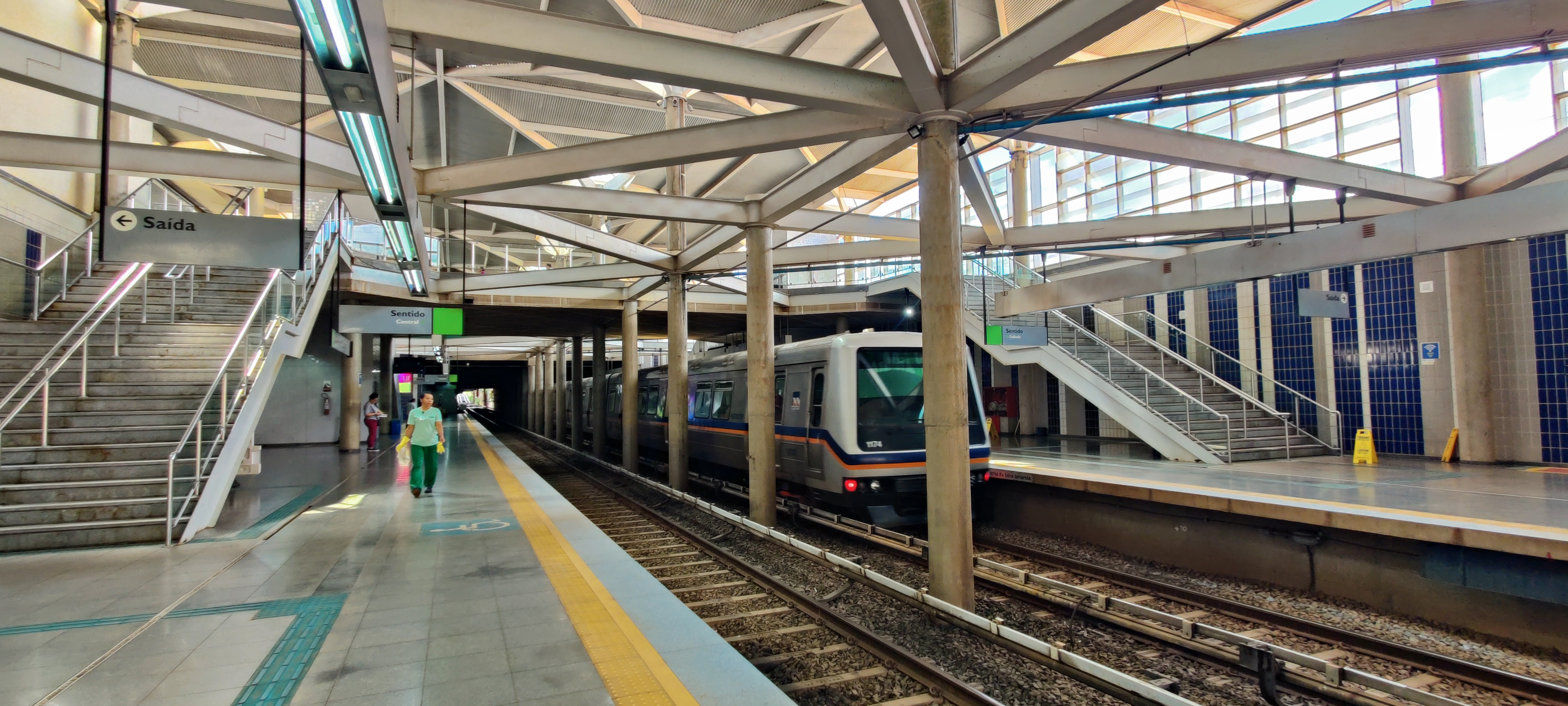
Platform

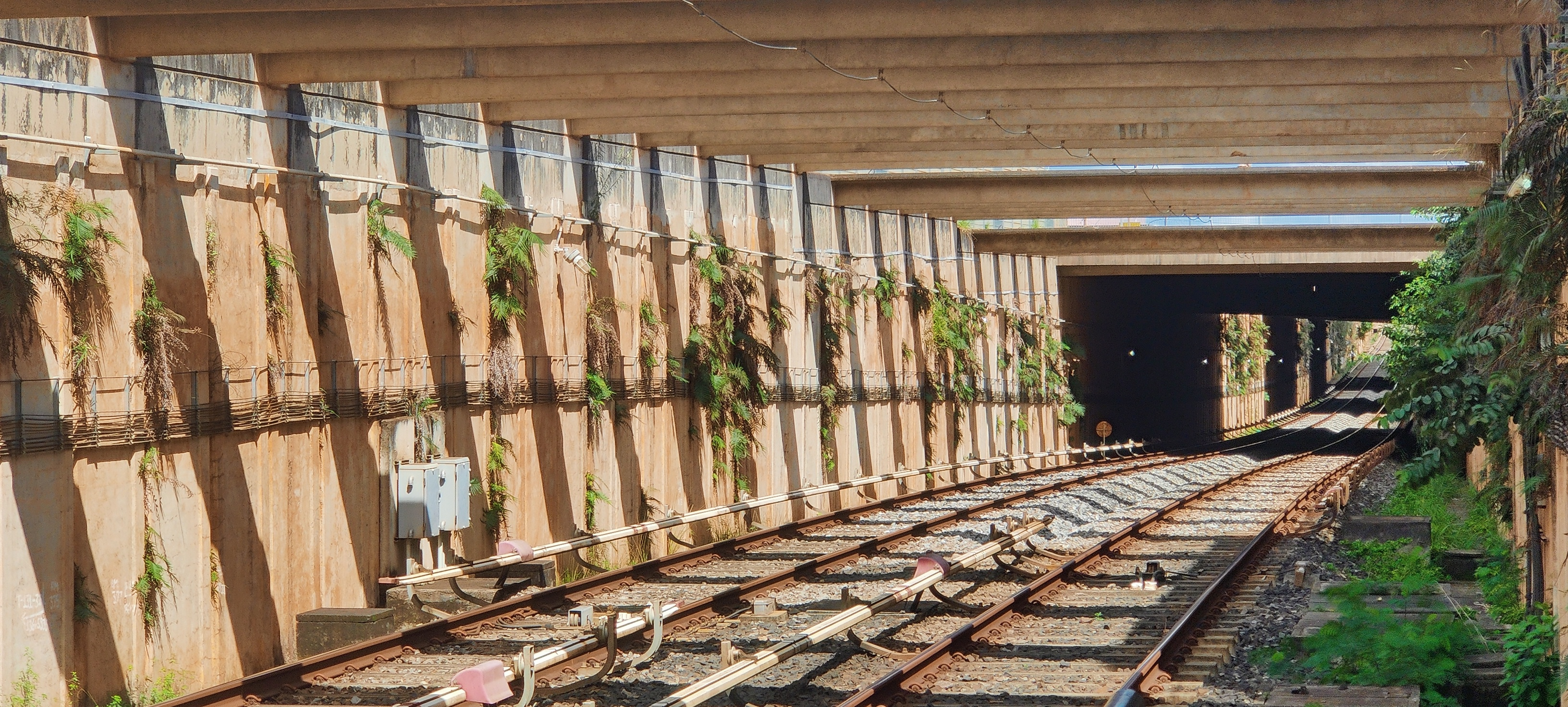
Tunnel
