= Centro Metropolitano station =

Federal District Metro station

Centro Metropolitano
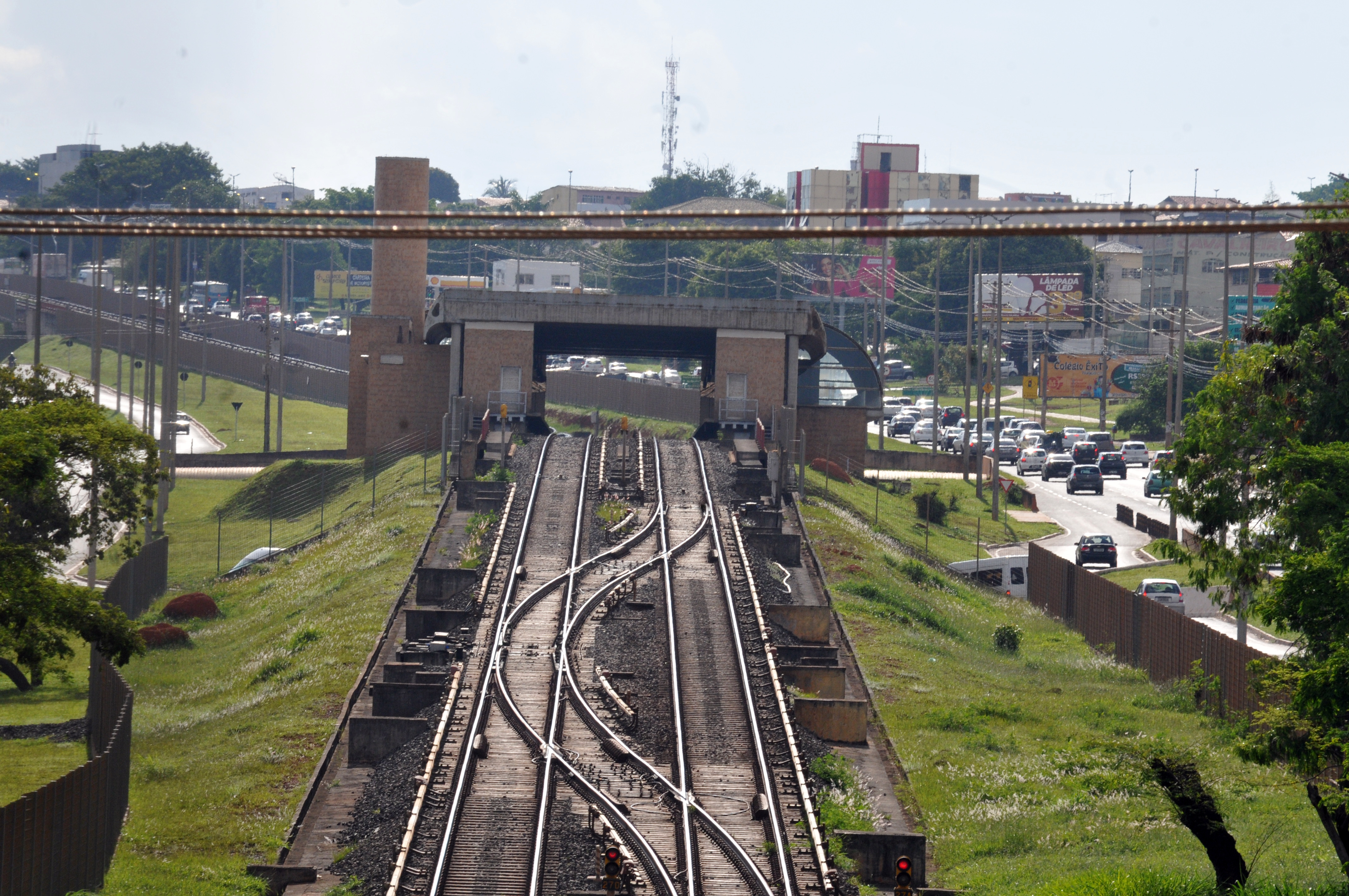
- Station view in 2020

General information
- Location: Av. Elmo Serejo; Taguatinga, Federal District; Brazil
- Coordinates: 15°50′07.6″S 48°05′10.3″W
- System: Federal District Metro station
- Owner: Government of the Federal District (Brazil)
- Operator: Companhia do Metropolitano do Distrito Federal (Metrô DF)
- Line: Green line
- Platforms: 2
- Tracks: 2

Construction
- Structure type: At-grade
- Accessible: Yes

Other information
- Station code: MET

History
- Opened: 23 April 2007
Location

Centro Metropolitano is a Federal District Metro brazilian station on the Green line. It was opened for full service on 23 April 2007 as part of the section between Praça do Relógio and Ceilândia Sul, though the shuttle service at this section started in November 2006. The station is located between Praça do Relógio and Ceilândia Sul. It is located on Avenida Elmo Serejo. It serves the administrative region of Taguatinga.

== Location ==
Nearby are the Taguatinga bus station and the Federal District Administrative Center, where passengers from interstate bus lines embark and disembark daily. It is also responsible for receiving fans who go to the Serejão Stadium (Boca do Jacaré), home of Brasiliense.
