= Ceilândia =

- Administrative region
- Região Administrativa de Ceilândia; Administrative Region of Ceilândia
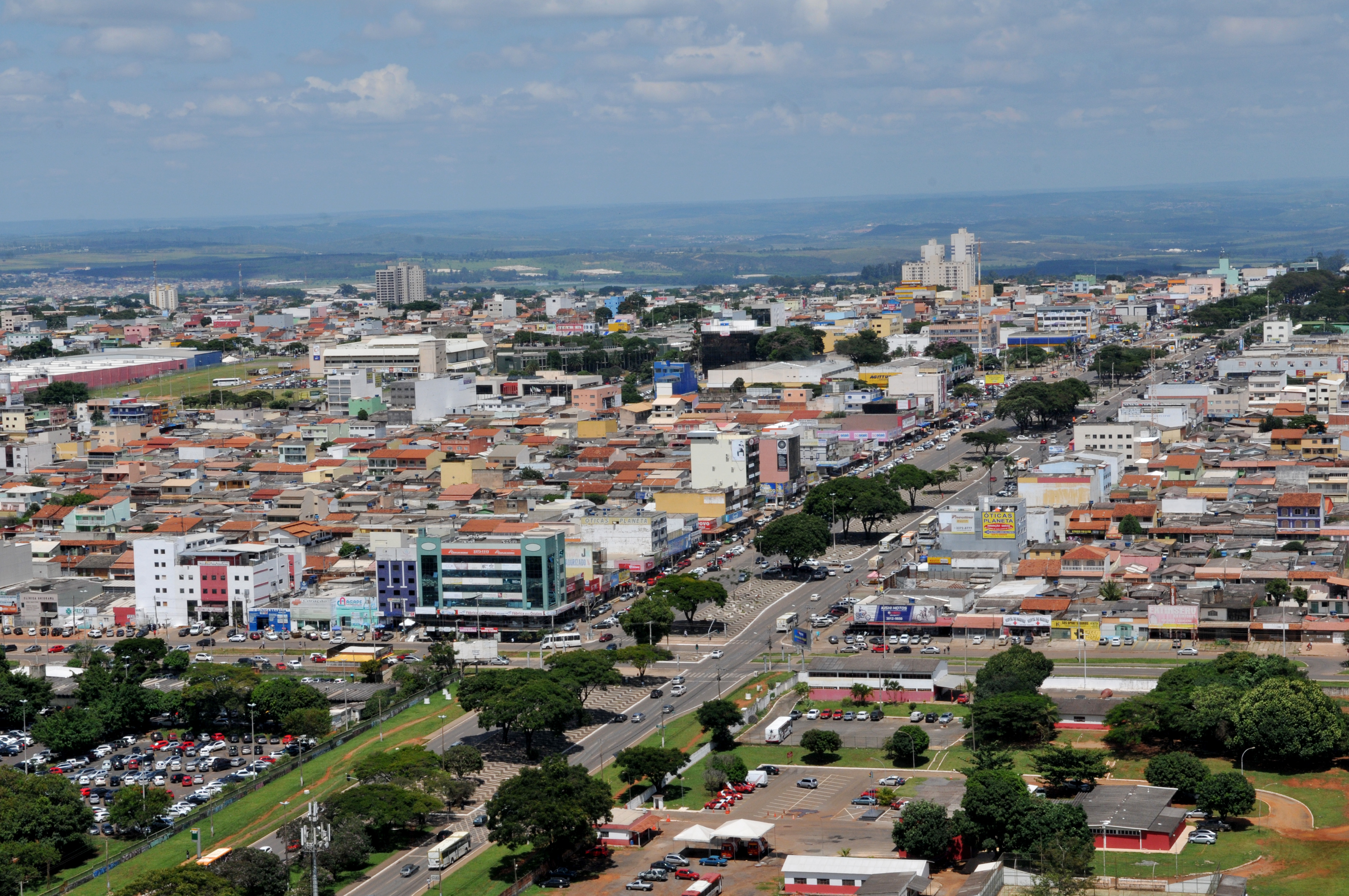
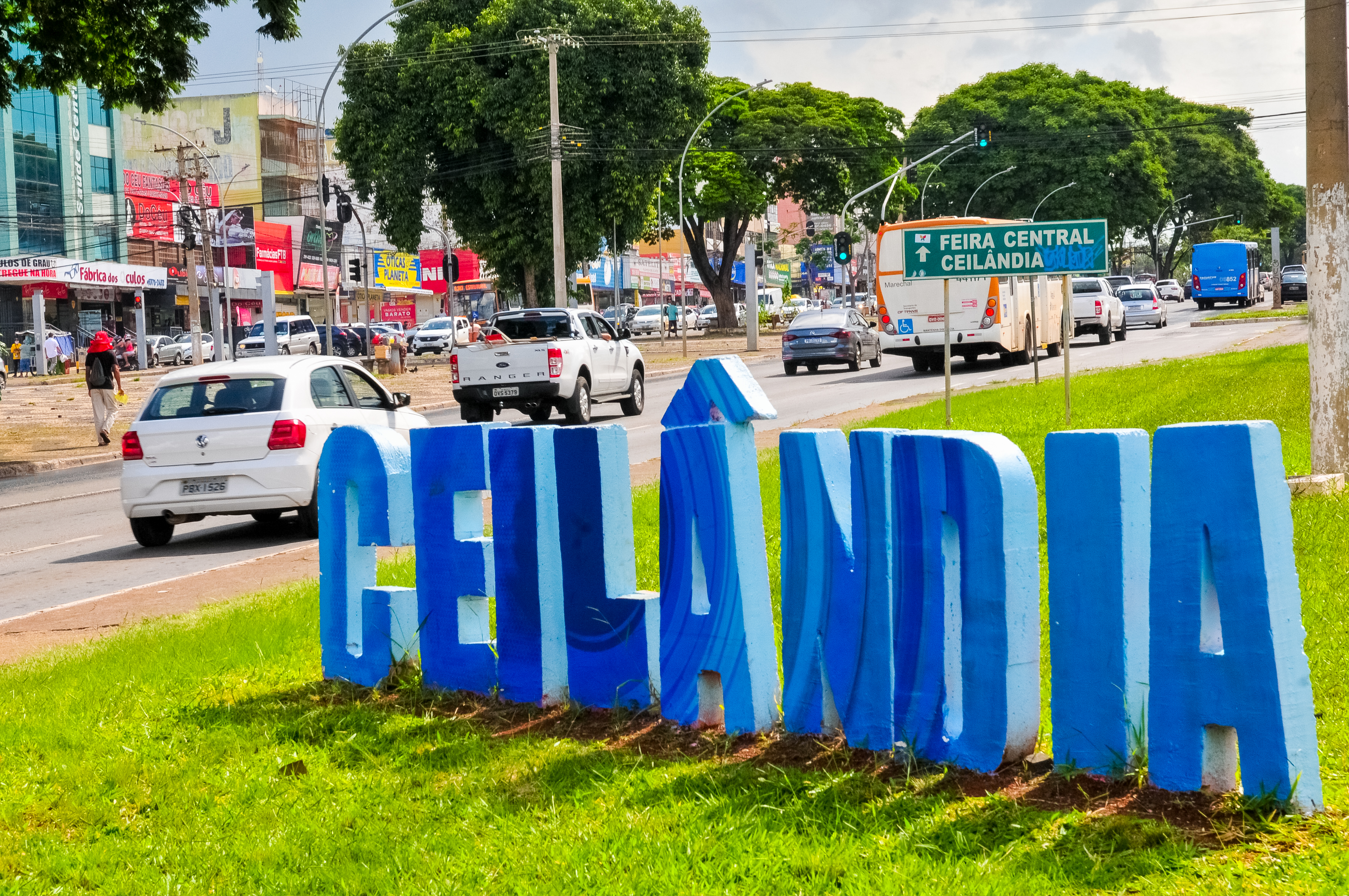
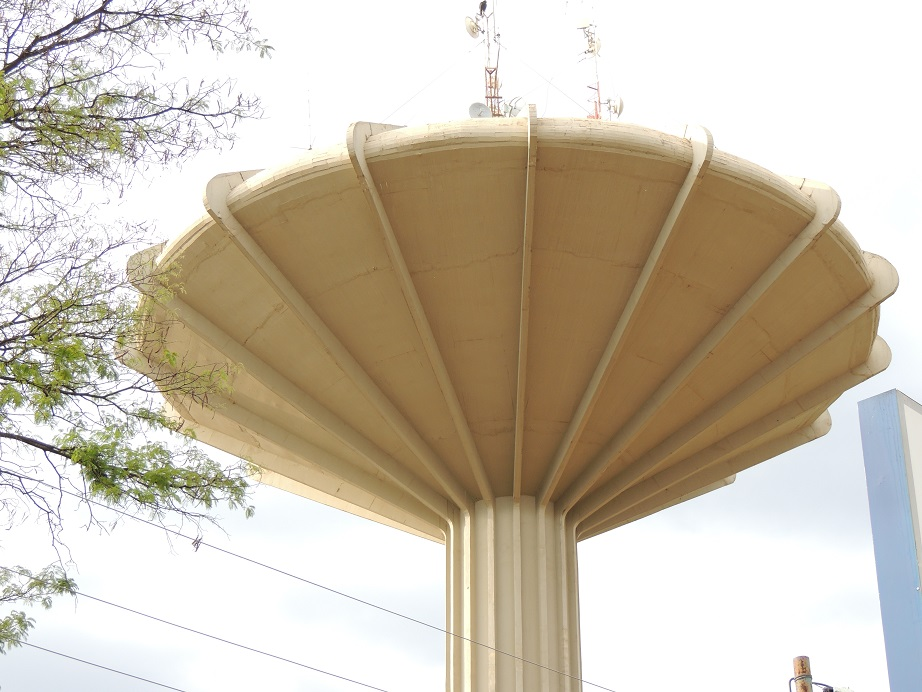
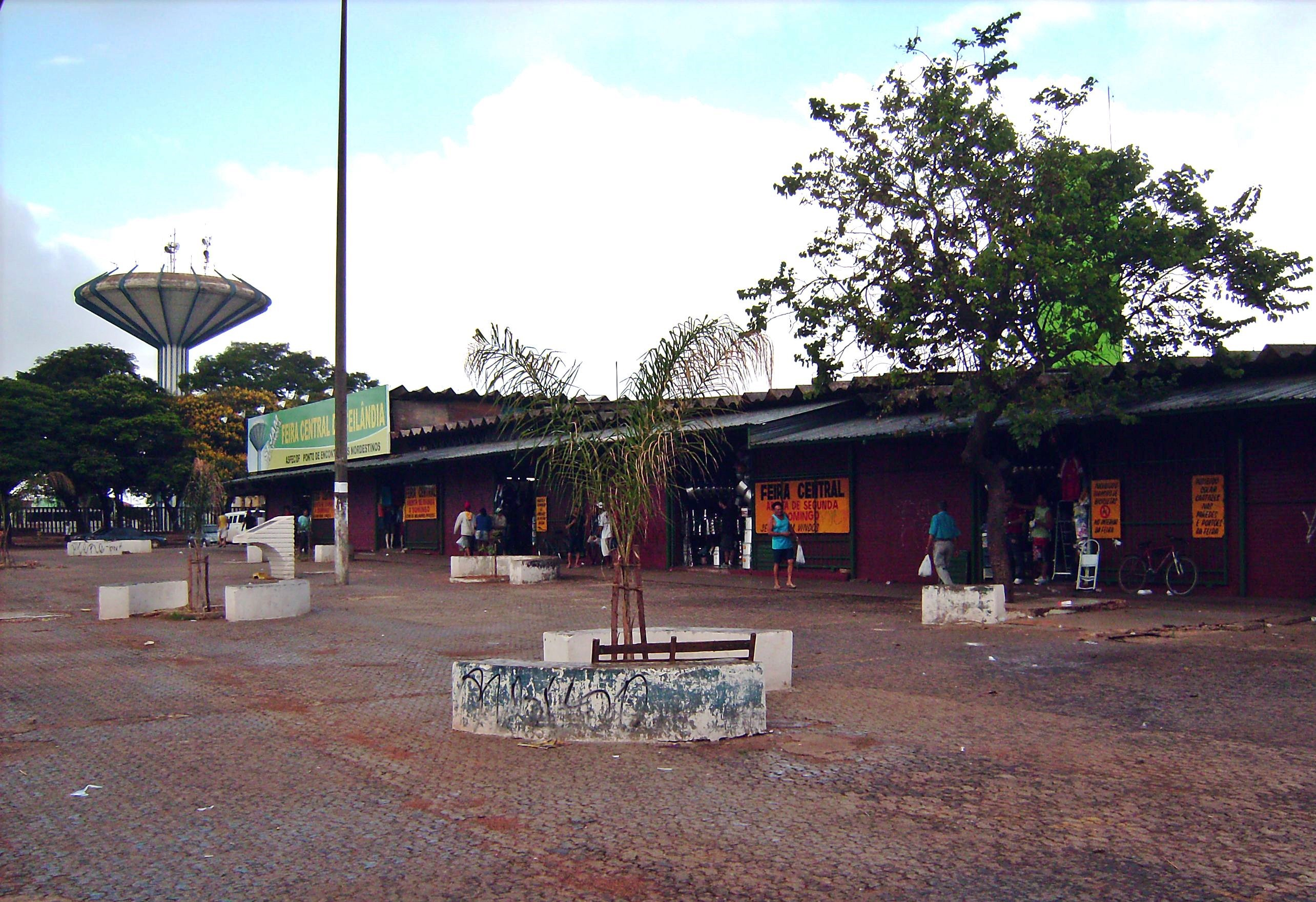
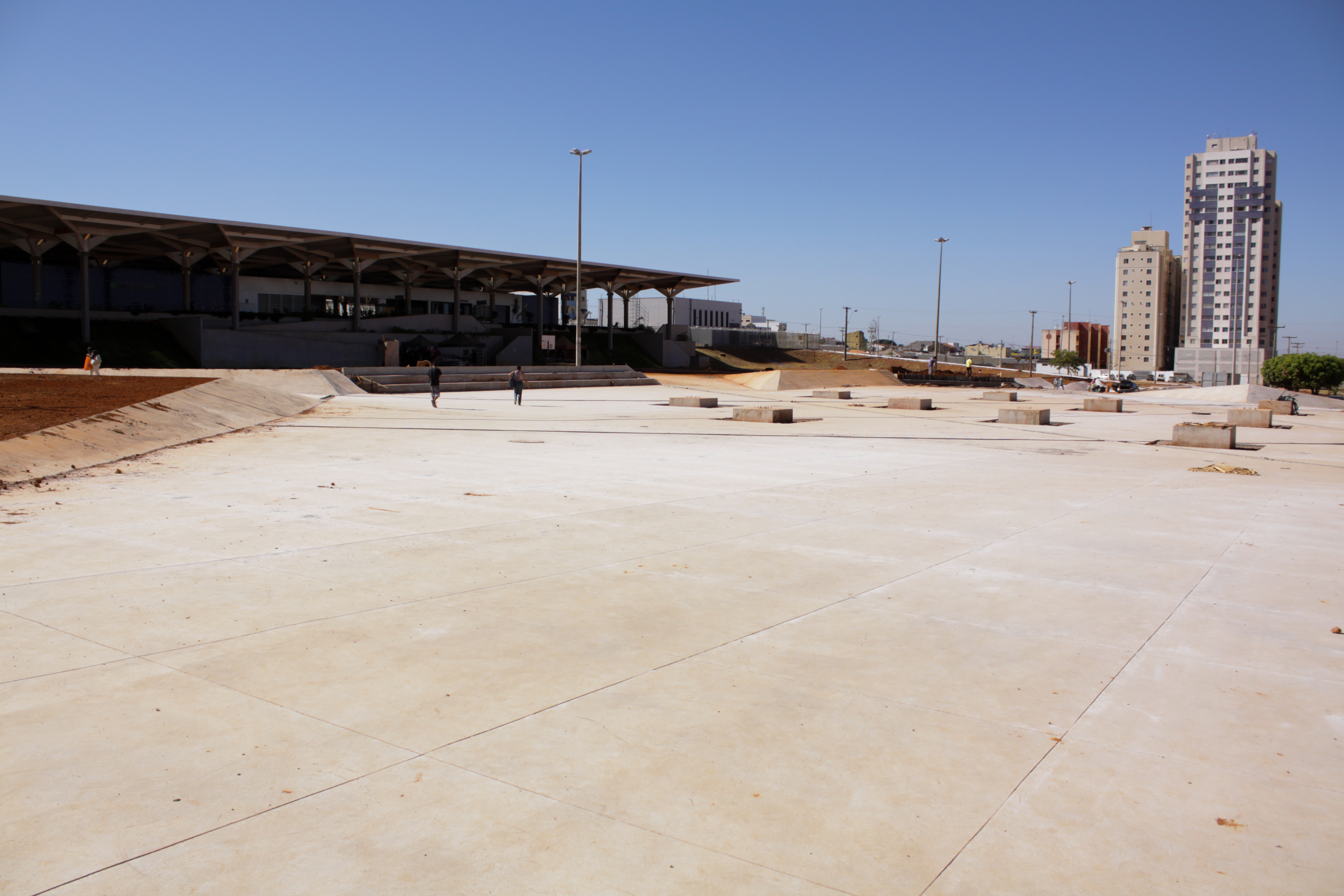
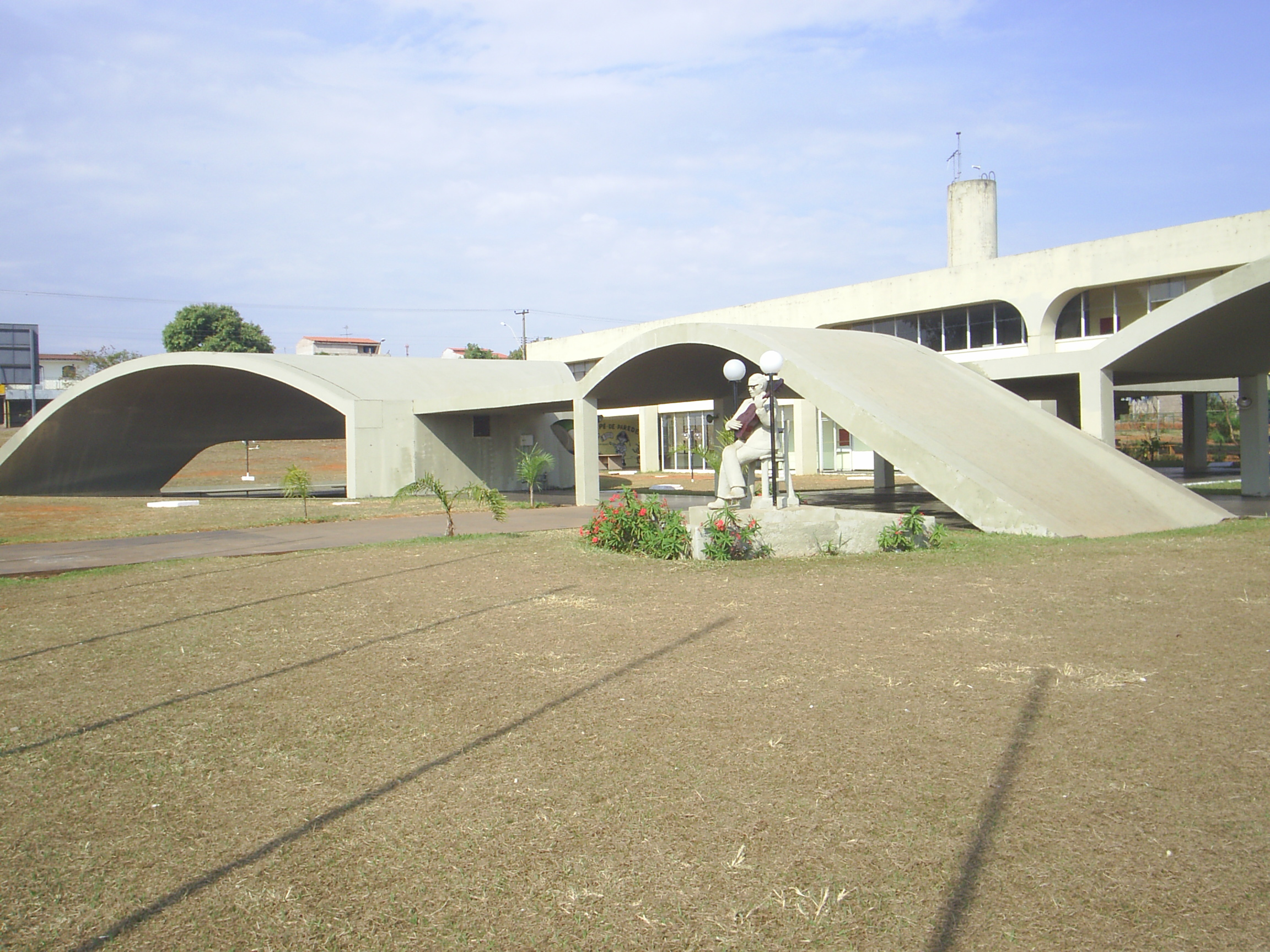
- Clockwise from top: City view, Water Tower, Bus terminal, Casa do Cantador, Fair, Ceilândia sign

- Flag
- Nickname: Cei
- Localization of Ceilândia in Federal District

- Localization of Ceilândia in Brazil
- Coordinates: 15°49′09″S 48°06′30″W
- Country: Brazil
- Region: Central-West
- State: Federal District
- Founded: March 27, 1971; 55 years ago

Government
  - Regional administrator: Vilson José de Oliveira

Area
  - Total: 230.30 km^{2} (88.92 sq mi)
- Elevation: 1,000 m (3,300 ft)

Population (2010)
  - Total: 398,374
  - Density: 1,729.8/km^{2} (4,480/sq mi)
- Demonym: Ceilandense
- Time zone: UTC−3 (BRT)
- Postal Code (CEP): 72200-000
- Area code: +55 61
- Website: www.ceilandia.df.gov.br

Ceilândia (Portuguese pronunciation: [sejˈlɐ̃dʒjɐ]) is an administrative region in the Federal District in Brazil. It is bordered by Brazlândia to the north, Taguatinga to the east, and Samambaia and Sol Nascente/Por do Sol to the south. With about 398,374 inhabitants, it is the administrative region of largest population in the Federal District. Ceilândia was created in 1971 by Hélio Prates da Silveira, originally created as the "CEI" (Portuguese: Campanha de Erradicação de Invasões, lit. 'Invasions Eradication Campaign') in 1969, a campaign to combat irregular settlements near Brasília.

== History ==
=== Early history ===
Ceilândia was originally created by the government in the 1970s as a campaign by then governor Hélio Prates da Silveira to keep people from moving into Brasília and setting up invasions. The root of the name Ceilândia is "CEI" (Portuguese: Campanha de Erradicação de Invasões: Invasions Eradication Campaign). The campaign was created by Hélio Prates da Silveira to prevent people from invading Brasilia, and to combat irregular settlements in the region.

In 1969, after only nine years of existence, the Federal District already had 79,128 people living in irregular occupations, out of a population of 500 thousand inhabitants in all of the Federal District. In that year a seminar took place in Brasília concerning social problems of the Federal District. Invasion dwellers were the most serious problem.

17619 lots were laid out and in 1970 the first construction began. In nine months the transfer of the families was concluded with the streets opening. The population had no water, no public lighting, and no public transport and struggled against dust, mud and flash floods.

Ceilândia was founded on March 27, 1971, receiving the status of administrative region, according to Law 49, of October 25, 1989.

=== Recent developments ===
Today Ceilândia is the largest electoral college of the Federal District and the most populous city, with more inhabitants than the Brasília. It occupies a total of 91 residential squares laid out like Brasília, intercalated by areas for local commerce, churches and schools. There are also some special areas that are set aside to provide community services.

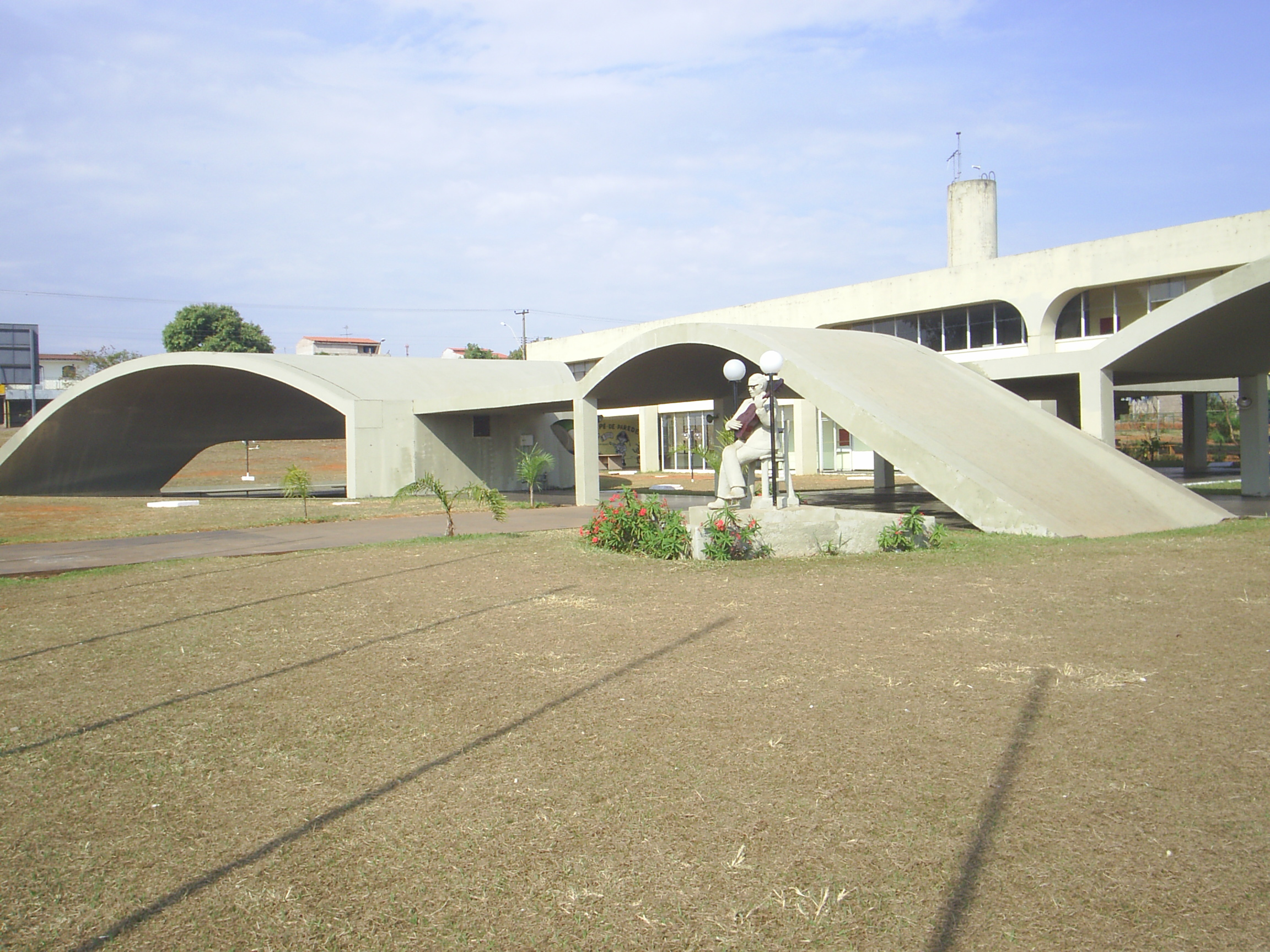
Partial view of the Casa do Cantador, one of its symbols

An active commercial center, it has 4,500 commercial establishments and 1,600 small industries. The economically active population is more than 160,000 people.

Two important locals of Ceilandia are the Caixa d'Água (Water Tower), and the Casa do Cantador (House of the Singer), a cultural center dedicated to the artists of Northeast Brazil. The building was designed by Oscar Niemeyer and completed in 1986.

== Ceilândia and its fairs ==
Ceilândia is considered the second largest "Northeastern city" outside the Brazilian Northeast Region (the first one is São Paulo). About 70% of the population is of Northeastern origin. The presence of the Northeast culture can be seen in the number of open-air fairs (13 in all). The fairs (feiras-livres) were also an alternative for the workers that did not find space in the economy of the Federal District. In most of them, fruits, foods, clothes and footwear are commercialized. The Fair of the Producer (Feira do Produtor e Atacadista de Ceilândia) sells wholesale and supplies almost 50% of the Federal District.

The Central Fair (Feira Permanente de Ceilândia), is the largest of all. It occupies an area of seven thousand square meters and sells household articles, tools, electric appliances, fruits, vegetables, and poultry. It is located next to the Caixa d'Água (Water Tower) - the symbol of Ceilândia. Another fair is the Feira do Rolo.

== Sports ==
=== Venues ===
- Estádio Maria de Lourdes Abadia

=== Clubs ===
- Football
  - Ceilândia Esporte Clube

== Transportation ==
Ceilândia is served by several highways connecting it to Brasília

- DF-075 (Estrada Parque Núcleo Bandeirante - EPNB);
- DF-085 (Estrada Parque Taguatinga - EPTG, or "Linha Verde");
- DF-095 (Estrada Parque Ceilândia - EPCL, or "Via Estrutural").

=== Metro ===
Ceilândia is served by the following Federal District Metro stations, and is expected to have two more stations.

- Ceilândia Sul station
- Ceilândia Centro station
- Ceilândia Norte station

== See also ==
- List of administrative regions of the Federal District
