= Ceilândia Sul station =

Federal District Metro station

Ceilândia Sul

General information
- Location: QNN 16, Conjunto P - Ceilândia Sul; Ceilândia, DF; Brazil
- Coordinates: 15°50′16.3″S 48°06′11.6″W
- System: Federal District Metro station
- Owner: Government of the Federal District (Brazil)
- Operator: Companhia do Metropolitano do Distrito Federal (Metrô DF)
- Line: Green line
- Platforms: 1
- Tracks: 2

Construction
- Structure type: At-grade
- Accessible: Yes

Other information
- Station code: CES

History
- Opened: 23 April 2007
Location

Ceilândia Sul is a Federal District Metro brazilian station on Green line. It was opened for full service on 23 April 2007 as the west terminus of the section between Praça do Relógio and Ceilândia Sul, though the shuttle service at this section started in November 2006. On 16 April 2008 the line was extended to Terminal Ceilândia. The station is located between Centro Metropolitano and Guariroba.
