= Praça do Relógio station =

Federal District Metro station

Praça do Relógio
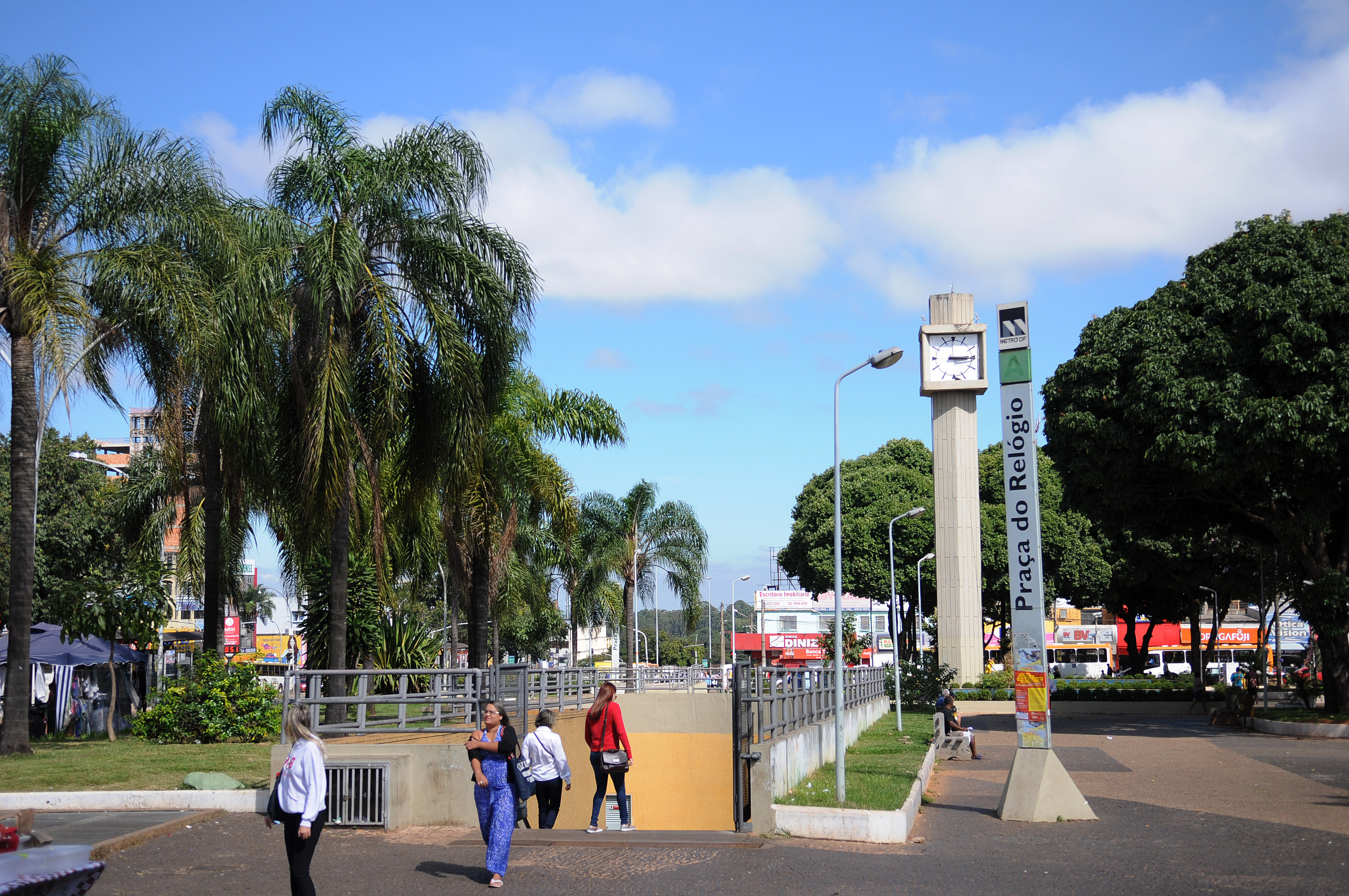
- The entrance to the station

General information
- Location: St. Central - Taguatinga; Federal District; Brazil
- Coordinates: 15°50′00.5″S 48°03′22.5″W
- System: Federal District Metro station
- Owner: Government of the Federal District (Brazil)
- Operator: Companhia do Metropolitano do Distrito Federal (Metrô DF)
- Line: Green line
- Platforms: 2
- Tracks: 2

Construction
- Structure type: Underground
- Accessible: Yes

Other information
- Station code: REL

History
- Opened: 31 March 2001
Location

Praça do Relógio (Station code: REL) is a Federal District Metro station operating on the Green line. It was opened on 31 March 2001 as the western terminus of the inaugural section of the line, from Central to Praça do Relógio. In November 2006, the line was extended to Ceilândia Sul as shuttle service, and on 23 April 2007, full service was opened. It is located between Estrada Parque and Centro Metropolitano. The station is named after Taguatinga's Praça do Relógio.
