= Terminal Ceilândia station =

Federal District Metro station

Terminal Ceilândia
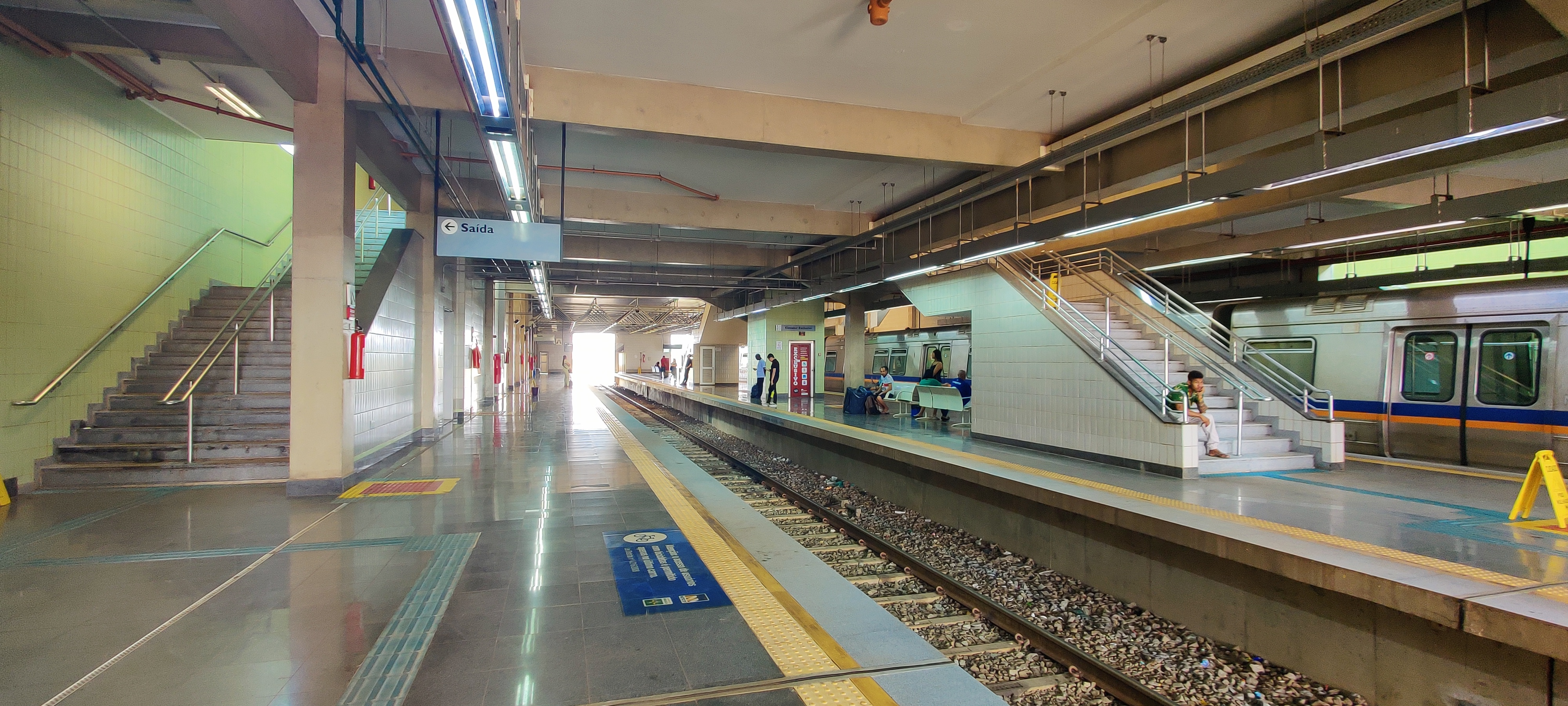
- The interior of the station

General information
- Location: Setor N Qnn 13 Conjunto P Ceilândia, DF; Brazil
- Coordinates: 15°48′18.9″S 48°07′17.4″W
- System: Federal District Metro station
- Owner: Government of the Federal District (Brazil)
- Operator: Companhia do Metropolitano do Distrito Federal (Metrô DF)
- Line: Green line
- Platforms: 3
- Tracks: 2

Construction
- Structure type: At-grade
- Accessible: Yes

Other information
- Station code: CEI

History
- Opened: 16 April 2008
Location

Terminal Ceilândia is a Federal District Metro station on the Green line, located in the administrative region of Ceilândia. The station is the western terminus of Green line. It was opened on 16 April 2008 as part of the section between Ceilândia Sul and Terminal Ceilândia. The adjacent station is Ceilândia Norte.
