= Federal District Metro (Brazil) =

Rapid transit system in the Federal District, Brazil

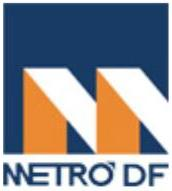

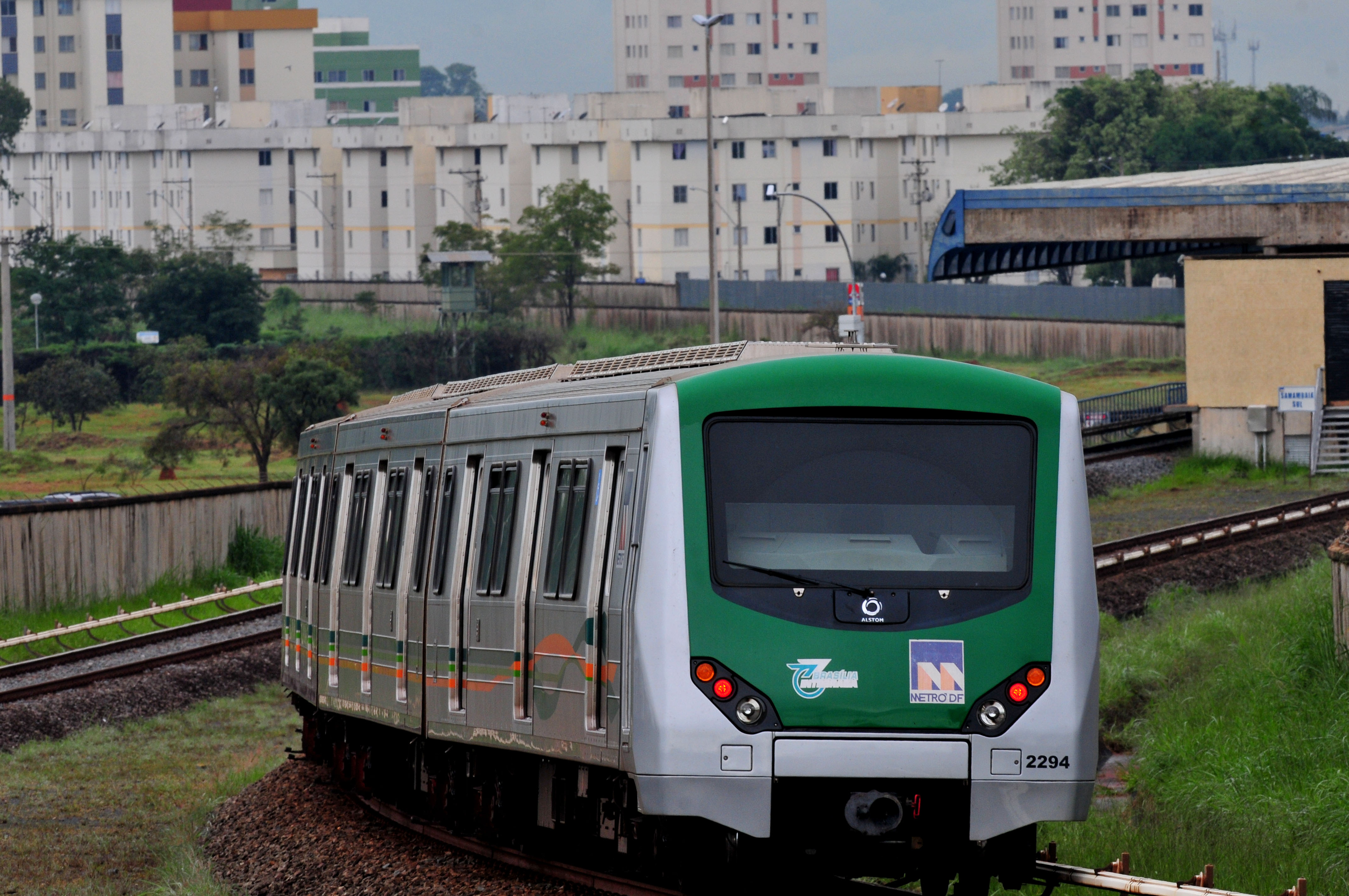
- TUE Série 2000 train of the Federal District Metro in Samambaia

Overview
- Native name: Metrô do Distrito Federal
- Locale: Federal District, Brazil
- Transit type: rapid transit
- Number of lines: 2
- Number of stations: 27 (+ 2 planned)
- Annual ridership: 39.1 million (2022)
- Website: Metrô-DF

Operation
- Began operation: 17 August 1998; 28 years ago (trial service); 24 September 2001; 25 years ago (revenue service)
- Operator: Companhia do Metropolitano do Distrito Federal (Metrô-DF)
- Number of vehicles: 32
- Train length: 4 cars

Technical
- System length: 42.4 km (26.3 mi)
- Track gauge: 1,600 mm (5 ft 3 in)
- Electrification: 750 V DC from third rail
- Average speed: 45 km/h (30 mph)
- Top speed: 80 km/h (50 mph)

The Federal District Metro (Portuguese: Metrô do Distrito Federal, commonly called Metrô DF) is the rapid transit system of the Federal District, in Brazil. It is operated by Companhia do Metropolitano do Distrito Federal and was opened in 2001. Currently, Federal District's Metro has 27 stations on two lines, and it runs for 42.38 kilometers (26.33 mi). The system passes through 6 Administrative regions of the Federal District, those being Brasília, Guará, Águas Claras, Taguatinga, Ceilândia, and Samambaia.

The metro covers the Federal District's main cities. Its main problem is the sheer distance between many stations (caused by overall low density, suburban profile for such system), making it only a small part of the transit system of the Federal District and mostly an intercity service, with exceptions in Brasília and Ceilândia. The administrative region of Águas Claras is well-served by the system, making it one of the fastest-growing areas of the Federal District and the most dense.

== History ==
The construction of the Federal District Metro began on 7 January 1992, and its first sections started operating in 1999, but because of a backlog of work, the metro was not opened at its originally-scheduled date and time (21 April 1994 at 17:00). Work was finally finished in the beginning of 2001, and commercial service began on 24 September of that year.

During the first months, the metro operated only from 10:00 to 16:00 over only 32 kilometers (20 mi) of the network of total of 41 kilometers (25 mi). Five more stations were opened in 2008: 108 South, Guariroba, Ceilândia Centro, Ceilândia Norte and Ceilândia Sul.

102 South and 112 South stations opened in 2009; Guará station opened in 2010. The 106 Sul Cine Brasília station and 110 Sul stations were opened on 16 September 2020.

== Operations ==
It operates from 06:00 to 23:30 Mondays to Saturdays, from 07:00 to 19:00 on Sundays. The metro's commercial speed is 45 kilometres per hour (28 miles per hour). The track gauge is 1,600 mm (5 ft 3 in) and powered by a third rail. Its stations are equipped with stairs and lifts.

=== Tickets and fares ===
The access to Metrô-DF is controlled by electronic entry and exit barriers. To travel on the metro, tickets are unitary, for a single trip, or by a magnetic card, which is inserted into the ticket barriers. The card can be recharged.

=== Lines ===
The Green and Orange Lines both begin at the Central station, under the Pilot Plan Bus Station in the centre of Brasília and run parallel up until the Águas Claras station. The Orange Line goes south to Samambaia. The Green Line follows to Ceilândia. The metro runs underground in Brasília (with the exception of the Asa Sul station) and through the Central Sector of Taguatinga, at Praça do Relógio station. Elsewhere, it runs on the surface.

| Line | Terminals | Opened | Length km (mi) | Stations | Length of trips (min) | Hours of operation |
|---|---|---|---|---|---|---|
| Green | Central ↔ Ceilândia | 17 August 1998 | 33.5 (20.8) | 23 | 40 | 05:30 to 23:30 Monday to Saturday; 07:00 to 19:00 on Sundays |
| Orange | Central ↔ Samambaia | 17 August 1998 | 28.0 (17.4) | 18 | 30 | 05:30 to 23:30 Monday to Saturday; 07:00 to 19:00 on Sundays |

=== Rolling stock ===
Its increasing use indicated the need to expand the original fleet of 20 four–car Alstom Metropolis trainsets. To deal with the increasing demand, 12 new four–car trainsets were purchased from Alstom, with the first arriving in the Federal District in June 2010, leading to a fleet of 32 trains in total.

All trains go through a period of engagement and dynamic tests, where all components of traction, braking, signaling and communication will be assessed. Therefore, it takes 30 days for effective operation of new cars. The new fleet incorporates a number of advanced technologies including a modern drive system, which reduces the technical flaws of trains and reduce the waiting time at stations. Before the Alstom trains were put into operation, the Federal District Metro carried about 160,000 passengers per day.

With the new Alstom Metropolis trainsets in operation, the Federal District Metro's headways can be reduced from four and a half minutes to three minutes, and its capacity will nearly double to 300,000 passengers per day. As of March 2011, all 12 of the new trainsets had been delivered and were in service. The Federal District Metro invested a total of R$ 325 million for the purchase of the new trains, modernizing the aging fleet, and purchasing spare parts. R$260 million was financed by BNDES, with the remainder being paid by the federal government.

== Expansion plans ==
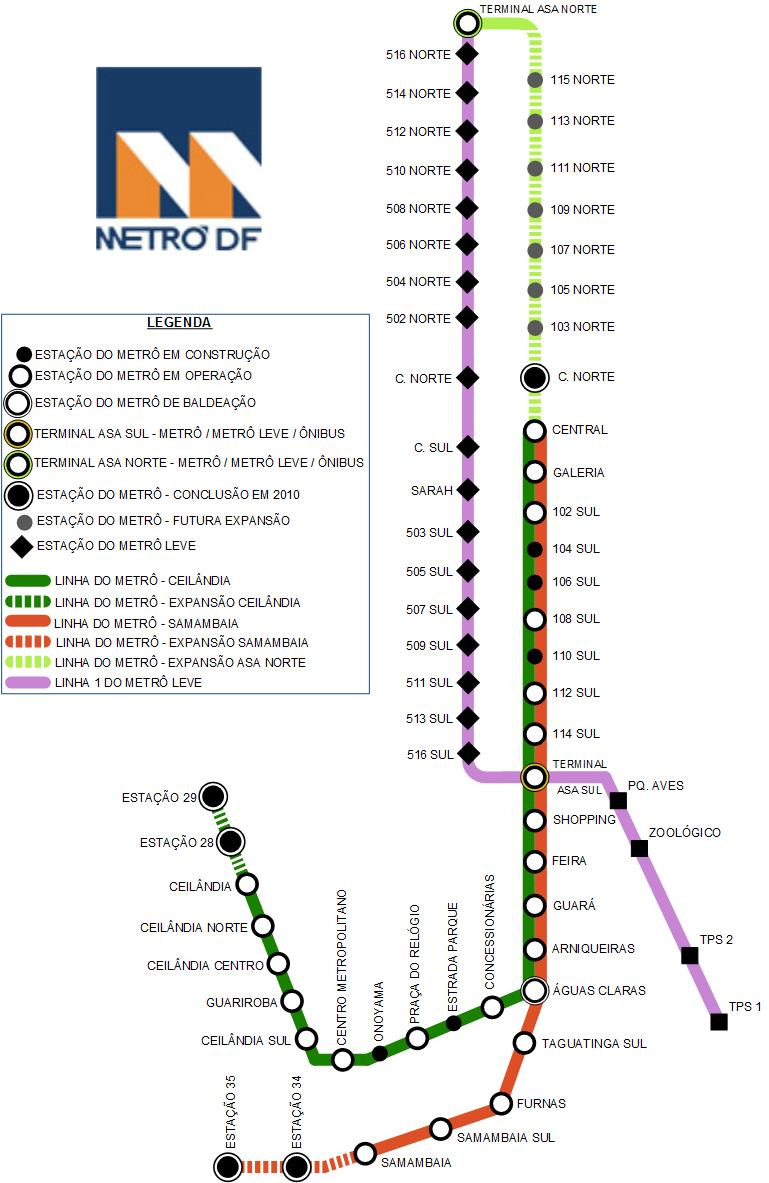
Map of the planned system. Black dots indicate unopened stations (as of 2010).

=== Metro ===
==== Line 1 ====
Under construction is a 3.6 kilometres (2.2 mi) extension of the Samambaia branch (Orange Line). Running in a trench west from the current Samambaia Terminal, construction includes three road viaducts, four pedestrian bridges, drainage and landscaping, three traction substations, associated signaling and communications, and two stations located near QR 111 and QR 117. Construction began in February 2025 at a cost of R$319 million. As of April 2026 the project was around 23% complete. The deadline for completion is May 2028. When complete it will be the final extent of the Samambaia branch and is estimated to serve an additional 12,000 to 15,000 daily passengers.

In September 2026 a R$844 million design-build contract was signed for a 2.3 kilometres (1.4 mi) extension to the Ceilândia branch (Green Line). The bidding process originally began in April 2024 but was suspended numerous times. Plans have the line to be built in a trench north from the current Ceilândia Terminal and includes nine viaducts and related roadworks, two traction substations, associated signaling and communications, and two stations located between QNO 5 and 13 and between QNO 7 and 15. Once construction begins there is a 45 month deadline to complete the project. When finished it will be the final extent of the Ceilândia branch and the full build-out of the original metro plan.

In addition to the extensions two underground infill stations are partially built and planned: 104 Sul in Brasília on the mainline and Onoyama in Taguatinga on the Ceilândia branch (Green Line). Also envisioned is an extension of the mainline past Central station along the North Wing with nine stations and a connection to VLT Line 1.

==== Line 2 ====
In September 2026 Governor Celina Leão announced advancement of a new metro line. Line 2 is proposed to be 79.8 kilometres (49.6 mi) long with 67 stations. The plan features a 40.1 kilometres (24.9 mi) mainline between Brasília and Santa Maria with two branches to Gama and Recanto das Emas.

The line is intended to connect the administrative regions of Brasília, Santa Maria, Gama, Recanto das Emas, Núcleo Bandeirante, Cruzeiro, Candangolândia, and Riacho Fundo II. Also identified are stations at Praça dos Três Poderes, National Congress Palace, Plano Piloto Bus Station, Catetinho, Polo JK industrial park, and Terminal Asa Sul station for interchange with Metro Line 1 and VLT Line 1.

The current proposal projects 240,000 daily passengers at cost of R$20.3 billion. Previous plans had envisioned the line as only 50 kilometres (31 mi) to 60 kilometres (37 mi) long with no branches, carrying an estimated 130,000 daily passengers, and costing between R$13.4 billion and R$20.4 billion.

=== Light rail (VLT) ===
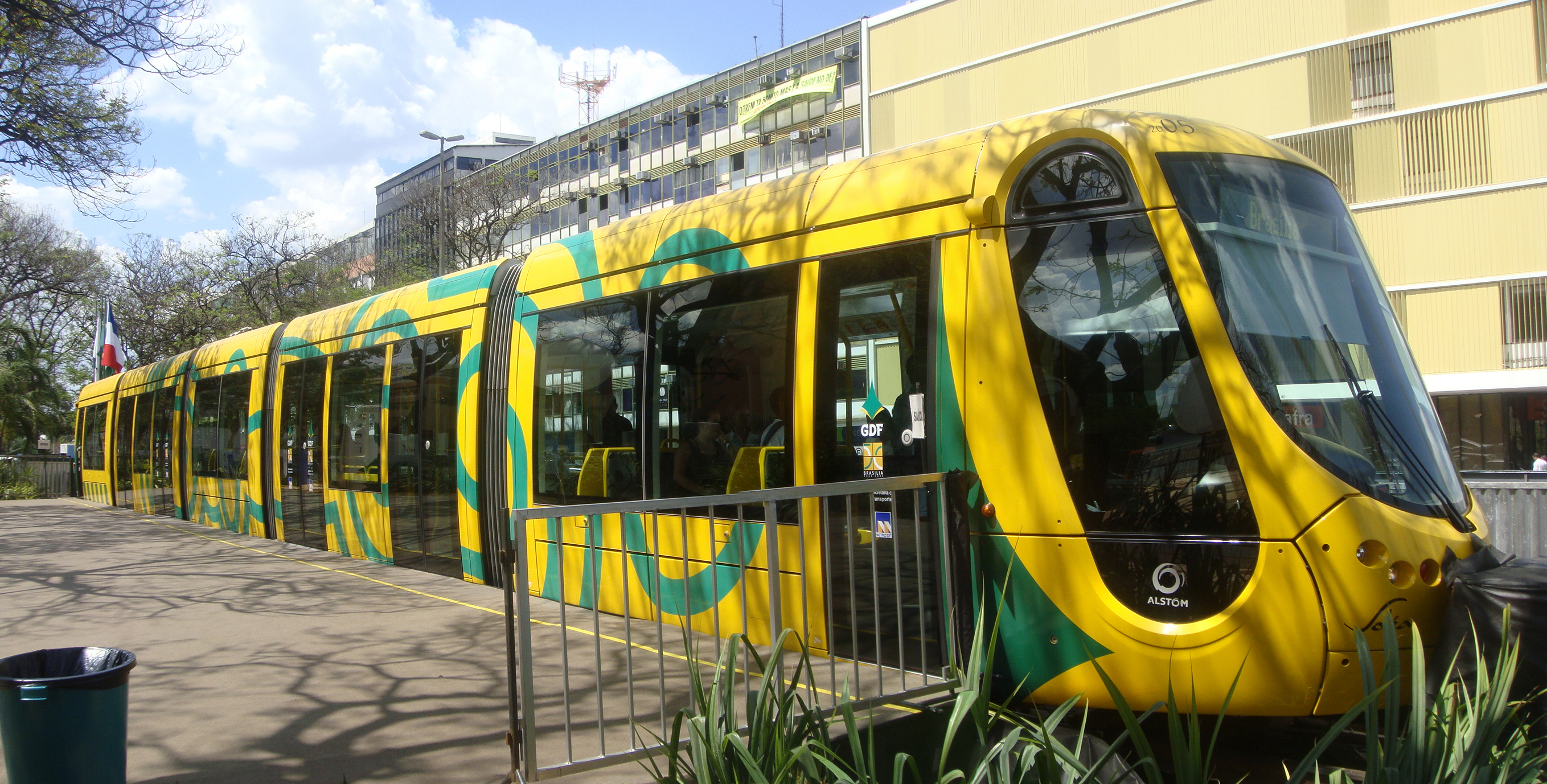
Federal District Light Rail is planned to connect the Federal District Metro to the International Airport.

==== Line 1 ====
In 2009, the originally-planned first stage of the new transport system in the Federal District was inaugurated. A metre gauge light rail line was planned to depart from rail Terminal South and cut over Estrada Parque Polícia Militar road and travel south to 502 Nouth, a distance of 8.7 kilometers (5.4 mi). It is one of three sections provided for in an online project to integrate a set of measures developed by the Government of the Federal District to revitalize the W3. The complete light rail line route would link rail Terminal North to the Brasília International Airport (Portuguese: Aeroporto Internacional Juscelino Kubitschek).

This original Terminal South stretch was planned to be ready for the 2014 FIFA World Cup. Work on this first phase started in 2009, under the company's management of the Federal District Metro. However, work on the line was suspended in April 2011 because of a fraudulent billing process, and the line was not ready for the 2014 FIFA World Cup, but it is still included in longer-term planning.

The more recent priority for the line rail line project was a planned 6.5-kilometer (4.0 mi), 7-station section including the section between rail Terminal South and the Brasília International Airport. The section was budgeted at R$276.9 million. The light rail line project was restarted, with the bidding process on the section from 2013.

== See also ==
- List of metro systems
- Rapid transit in Brazil
