= Terminal Samambaia station =

Federal District Metro station

Terminal Samambaia
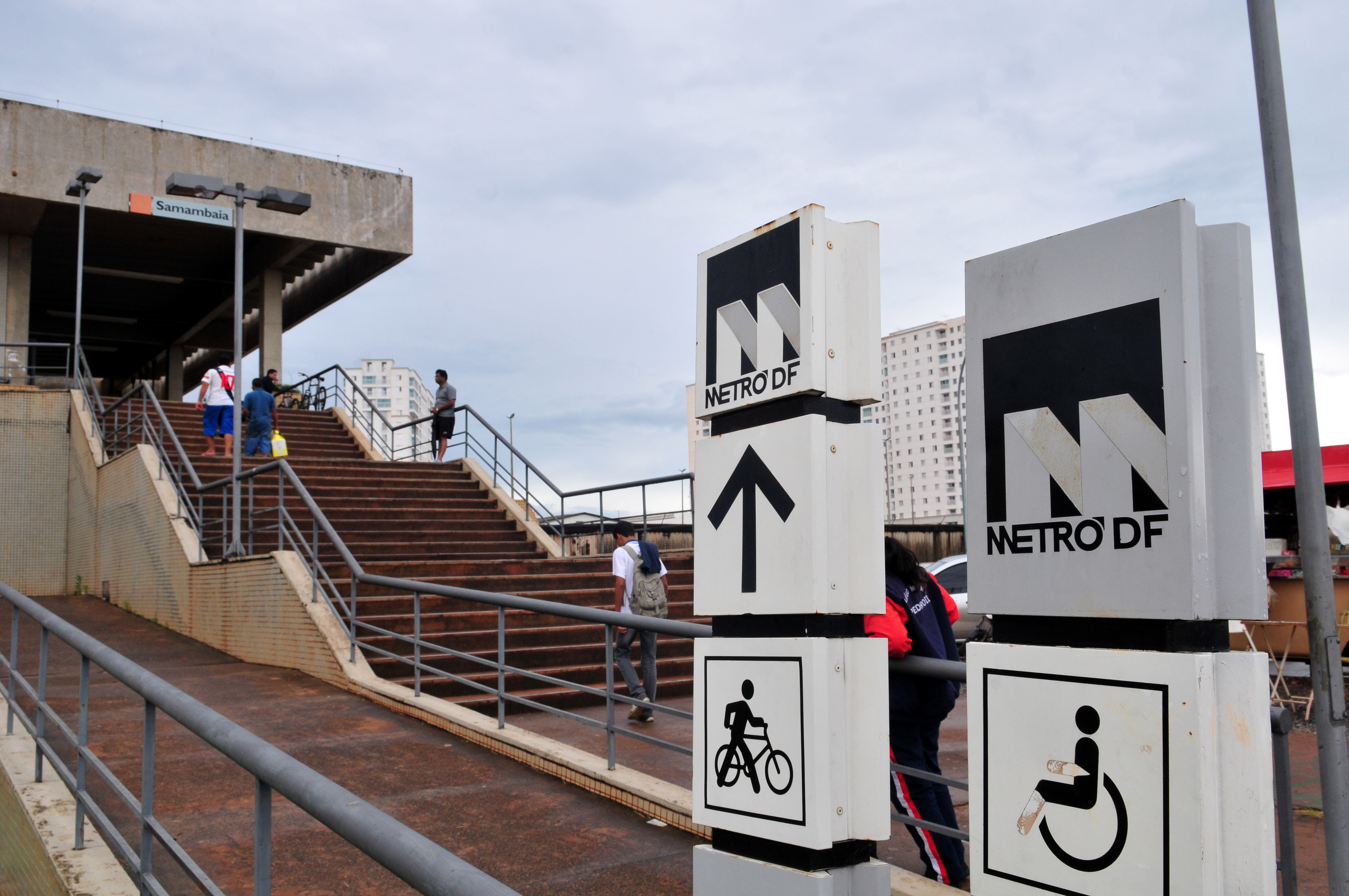
- Terminal Samambaia

General information
- Location: Q 202 Conjunto 5, Samambaia; Federal District; Brazil
- Coordinates: 15°52′25.3″S 48°05′05.9″W
- System: Federal District Metro station
- Owner: Government of the Federal District (Brazil)
- Operator: Companhia do Metropolitano do Distrito Federal (Metrô DF)
- Line: Orange line
- Platforms: 3
- Tracks: 2

Construction
- Structure type: At-grade
- Accessible: Yes

Other information
- Station code: SAM

History
- Opened: 31 March 2001; 25 years ago
Location

Terminal Samambaia (Station code: SAS) is a Federal District Metro Brazilian station on the Orange line. It opened on 31 March 2001 on the inaugural section of the line, from Central to Terminal Samambaia, and remains the southern terminus of the line. The adjacent station is Samambaia Sul.
