= Central station (Federal District Metro) =

Federal District Metro station

Central
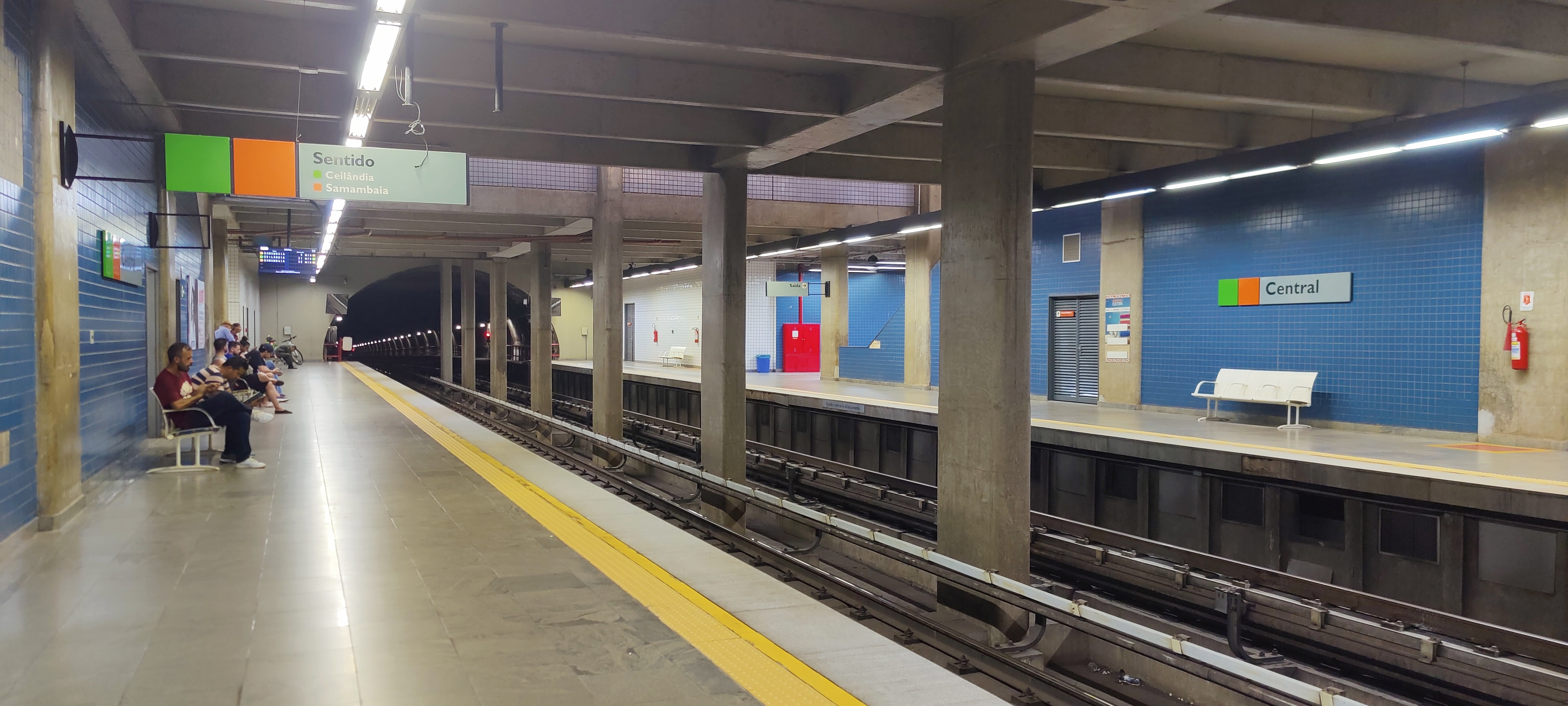

General information
- Location: Brasília, Federal District; Brazil
- Coordinates: 15°47′36″S 47°53′02.9″W
- System: Federal District Metro station
- Owner: Government of the Federal District (Brazil)
- Operator: Companhia do Metropolitano do Distrito Federal (Metrô DF)
- Lines: Orange line, Green line
- Platforms: 2 (lateral)
- Tracks: 2

Construction
- Structure type: Underground
- Accessible: Yes

Other information
- Station code: CTL

History
- Opened: 31 March 2001

Services
Preceding station	Metrô DF	Following station
Galería towards Ceilândia	Line 1 Green	Terminus
Galería towards Samambaia	Line 1 Orange	Terminus
Location

Central (Station code: CTL) is a Federal District Metro station which operates on both the Orange and Green lines. The station is located on Brasília's Monumental Axis, underneath the Plano Piloto Bus Terminal. It was opened on 31 March 2001 as the northern terminus of the inaugural section of the line, from Central to Terminal Samambaia and Praça do Relógio. The adjacent station is Galería.

== Location ==
It is located on the Monumental Axis of Brasília. Nearby is the Plano Piloto Bus Station, the main bus terminal in the Federal District.

== Connections ==
As the station is located at the Rodoviária bus terminal of Brasília, it has connections with various TCB bus lines which are:

• 0.108 Rodoviária do Plano Piloto / Três Poderes

• 108.3 Rodoviária do Plano Piloto / STJ - TST (Pier 21)

• 108.5 Rod. Plano Piloto / Shopping Popular (Rodoferroviária - Esplanada)

• 108.4 Rodoviária do Plano Piloto / Esplanada / Buruti

• 108.6 Rodoviária do Plano Piloto / Shopping Popular (Rodoferroviária)

• 108.7 Rod. Plano Piloto / Buriti / QGE / SMU / Rodoviária

• 108.8 Rod. Plano Piloto / W3 Sul / Term. Asa Sul / Nova Rod. Interestadual
