= Estrela da Casa season 2 =

Estrela da Casa
- Season 2
- Hosted by: Ana Clara
- Winner: Thainá Gonçalves
- Runner-up: Hanii
- No. of episodes: 43

Release
- Original network: TV Globo
- Original release: August 25 – October 6, 2025

Season chronology
- ← Previous; Season 1

The second season of the Brazilian singing competition series Estrela da Casa premiered on August 25, 2025, on TV Globo, hosted by Ana Clara, with Michel Teló making his debut as a mentor.

Following the poorly received first season, the format was revamped to improve engagement and focus on musical development. The winner receives a cash prize, career management, and support for a national tour.

On October 6, 2025, Thainá Gonçalves won the competition over Hanii, Juceir Jr., and Daniel Sobral, who finished second, third, and fourth, respectively.

== Format ==
Fourteen contestants train at the Music Training Center, developing their vocal skills, stage presence, and artistry. Each releases a personal single, with chart performance granting potential advantages. A key format change is the voting system: contestants no longer vote for each other, and all evaluations are conducted by the public, who rate performers from 7 to 10 on the Gshow platform.

Weekly challenges include Stage Owner, where the winner selects artists for the Duel, with both winners earning immunity, and the Jingle challenge, in which contestants compose branded jingles for immunity. All contestants perform live in the Festival, where the bottom three face a jury of three celebrity guest judges that saves one, and the lowest-scoring contestant is eliminated. The weekly Hitmaker title is awarded to the contestant whose song receives the most plays.

== Contestants ==
The fourteen artists were officially revealed on July 30, 2025.

Artist	Age	Hometown	Musical style	Intro song	Result
Nirah	30	Breves	Tecnomelody	"Daqui Pra Sempre"	Eliminated 1st
Ruama Feitosa	27	São Paulo	Sertanejo	"Evidências"	Eliminated 2nd
Talíz	27	Samambaia	R&B	"Jeito Sexy (Shy Guy)"	Eliminated 3rd
Brenno Casagrande	30	Salvador	MPB	"Várias Queixas"	Eliminated 4th
Gabriel Smaniotto	29	Foz do Iguaçu	Sertanejo	"Estou Apaixonado (Estoy Enamorado)"	Eliminated 5th
Biahh Cavalcante	25	Rio Claro	Sertanejo	"Majestade, o Sabiá"	Eliminated 6th
Camille Vitoria	22	São João de Meriti	R&B	"Meiga e Abusada"	Eliminated 7th
Bea	27	Nova Iguaçu	Pagode	"Deixa Acontecer"	Eliminated 8th
Sudário	36	Uberlândia	Pagode	"Essa Tal Liberdade"	Eliminated 9th
Janício	27	Campina Grande	Forró	"Esperando na Janela"	Eliminated 10th
Daniel Sobral	33	Benevides	Gospel	"Vitorioso És (Victory Is Yours)"	Fourth place
Juceir Jr.	35	Saquarema	Pop	"Aguenta Coração"	Third place
Hanii	33	Santo André	R&B	"Um Dia de Domingo"	Runner-up
Thainá Gonçalves	33	Rio de Janeiro	Gospel	"O Maior Vilão Sou Eu"	Winner

== Results summary ==
=== Elimination chart ===
	Week 1		Week 2	Week 3	Week 4		Week 5	Week 6			
	Day 1	Day 4	Week 2	Week 3	Day 22	Day 25	Week 5	Day 37	Day 39	Day 41	Finale
Stage Owner	(none)		Brenno	Daniel	Daniel	(none)	Bea	Sudário	(none)		
Duel	(none)		Bea; 8.87 public score	Gabriel; 9.05 public score	Brenno; 9.11 public score	(none)	Camille; 9.33 public score	Janício; 8.96 public score	(none)		
Duel	(none)		Hanii; 9.56 public score	Janício; 9.21 public score	Janício; 9.31 public score	(none)	Thainá; 8.98 public score	Juceir; 9.44 public score	(none)		
Jingle Winner	(none)	Brenno	Biahh	(none)	Camille	Daniel	(none)	Juceir	(none)		
Thainá	9.38	9.30	9.19	9.05	8.99	8.783	8.91	Bottom Four	Bottom Four	9.29	Winner (Day 43)
Hanii	8.24	9.07	Duel Winner	8.79	8.67	8.819	9.14	9.23	9.191	9.48	Runner-up (Day 43)
Juceir	9.52	Immune	9.03	8.85	8.92	8.969	9.09	Duel Winner	9.114	9.26	Third place (Day 43)
Daniel	9.50	Immune	8.82	Stage Owner	Stage Owner	Jingle Winner	8.99	Bottom Four	Bottom Four	9.03	Fourth place (Day 43)
Janício	9.21	8.93	Bottom Three	Duel Winner	Duel Winner	Bottom Three	Bottom Three	9.08	Bottom Four	Eliminated (Day 39)	
Sudário	8.63	9.03	9.13	8.77	8.95	8.716	Bottom Three	Stage Owner	Bottom Four	Eliminated (Day 39)	
Bea	9.33	Bottom Three	8.72	Bottom Three	Bottom Three	8.805	Stage Owner	Bottom Four	Eliminated (Day 37)		
Camille	8.81	9.24	8.61	9.05	Jingle Winner	Bottom Three	Duel Winner	Bottom Four	Eliminated (Day 37)		
Biahh	9.09	Bottom Three	Jingle Winner	Bottom Three	Bottom Three	8.907	Bottom Three	Eliminated (Day 32)			
Gabriel	8.69	8.72	Bottom Three	8.73	8.79	Bottom Three	Eliminated (Day 25)				
Brenno	9.09	Jingle Winner	Stage Owner	8.82	Bottom Three	Eliminated (Day 22)					
Talíz	9.43	8.77	8.81	Bottom Three	Eliminated (Day 15)						
Ruama	8.57	8.85	Bottom Three	Eliminated (Day 10)							
Nirah	8.77	Bottom Three	Eliminated (Day 4)								
Notes	1		none	2	3		4	5		6	
Bottom scores	No elimination	Bea; Biahh; Nirah	Gabriel; Janício; Ruama	Bea; Biahh; Talíz	Bea; Biahh; Brenno	Camille; Gabriel; Janício	Biahh; Janício; Sudário	Bea; Camille; Daniel; Thainá	Daniel; Janício; Sudário; Thainá	No elimination	(none)
Judges' save	No elimination	Bea; 8.52 public score	Janício; 8.53 public score	Bea; 8.65 public score	Biahh; 8.55 public score	Janício; 8.704 public score	Janício; 8.72 public score	Daniel; 9.06 public score	Thainá; 9.112 public score	No elimination	(none)
Eliminated	No elimination	Nirah; 8.29 public score	Ruama; 8.45 public score	Talíz; 8.70 public score	Brenno; 8.59 public score	Gabriel; 8.683 public score	Biahh; 8.56 public score	Camille; 8.89 public score	Sudário; 8.696 public score	No elimination	Daniel; 27.23 public total
Eliminated	No elimination	Nirah; 8.29 public score	Ruama; 8.45 public score	Talíz; 8.70 public score	Brenno; 8.59 public score	Gabriel; 8.683 public score	Biahh; 8.56 public score	Camille; 8.89 public score	Sudário; 8.696 public score	No elimination	Juceir; 27.90 public total
Eliminated	No elimination	Nirah; 8.29 public score	Ruama; 8.45 public score	Talíz; 8.70 public score	Brenno; 8.59 public score	Gabriel; 8.683 public score	Biahh; 8.56 public score	Bea; 8.92 public score	Janício; 8.797 public score	No elimination	Juceir; 27.90 public total
Eliminated	No elimination	Nirah; 8.29 public score	Ruama; 8.45 public score	Talíz; 8.70 public score	Brenno; 8.59 public score	Gabriel; 8.683 public score	Biahh; 8.56 public score	Bea; 8.92 public score	Janício; 8.797 public score	No elimination	Hanii; 27.98 public total
Survived	No elimination	Biahh; 8.54 public score	Gabriel; 8.54 public score	Biahh; 8.71 public score	Bea; 8.62 public score	Camille; 8.709 public score	Sudário; 8.73 public score	Thainá; 8.96 public score	Daniel; 8.971 public score	No elimination	Thainá; 28.09 public total

Notes

- ^Note 1 : The Stage Owner challenge and the Duel were not held in the first week. On the premiere night, everyone performed live, and the two highest-scoring contestants (Juceir and Daniel) won immunity for the first Festival, later joined by Brenno (Jingle winner).
- ^Note 2 : The Jingle challenge was not held in the third week due to the Festival being moved up from Thursday to Monday. As result, only two contestants were immune: Daniel (Stage Owner) and Janício (Duel winner).
- ^Note 3 : Week 4 featured a double festival on Monday and Thursday. As a result, the Stage Owner Challenge and the Duel were not held during the second festival of the week. Consequently, only one contestant received immunity: Daniel (Jingle winner).
- ^Note 4 : The Jingle challenge was not held in the fifth week. As result, only two contestants were immune: Bea (Stage Owner) and Camille (Duel winner).
- ^Note 5 : During the final week, two festivals determined the finalists through double eliminations. The last winner of the Jingle challenge, as announced, would not receive immunity but was instead awarded a prize of R$10.000. Juceir won the challenge but was already immune for the first Festival on Tuesday, having won the season's final Duel, just like the last Stage Owner, Sudário. For the second Festival on Thursday, no one would be immune and everyone would be eligible for elimination.
- ^Note 6 : The finale is in two parts. On Saturday, the finalists perform and receive public scores. On Monday, they sing two songs, each rated by the audience. The combined total from both nights determines the winner.

=== Festival details ===
Key

Artist won the Stage Owner challenge and had to nominate two artists for the Duel.
Artist won the Duel and was immune for the week.
Artist won the Jingle challenge and was immune.
Artist received the highest public score of the week.
Artist's release received the highest percentage of streams and became the Hitmaker.
Artist was among the Bottom Three with the lowest public scores.
Artist was eliminated.

==== Week 1 ====
Premiere Festival
Artist	Order	Song	Score	Rank	Result	Streams	Rank
Hanii	1	"Rock with You"	8.24	14th	Safe	Unreleased	
Sudário	2	"Nosso Primeiro Beijo"	8.63	12th	Safe	Unreleased	
Thainá	3	"Break Every Chain"	9.38	4th	Safe	Unreleased	
Ruama	4	"Dois Tristes"	8.57	13th	Safe	Unreleased	
Talíz	5	"At Last"	9.43	3rd	Safe	Unreleased	
Camille	6	"Nada Mais (Lately)"	8.81	9th	Safe	Unreleased	
Gabriel	7	"Logo Eu"	8.69	11th	Safe	Unreleased	
Janício	8	"Qui Nem Jiló"	9.21	7th	Safe	Unreleased	
Bea	9	"Conselho"	9.33	6th	Safe	Unreleased	
Nirah	10	"Infiel"	8.77	10th	Safe	Unreleased	
Juceir	11	"Corazón Partío"	9.52	1st	Immunity	Unreleased	
Biahh	12	"Nuvem de Lágrimas"	9.37	5th	Safe	Unreleased	
Brenno	13	"A Novidade"	9.09	8th	Safe	Unreleased	
Daniel	14	"Jeová Jireh"	9.50	2nd	Immunity	Unreleased	
Top 14 Festival
Juceir	1	"Enrosca"	Non-competitive		Immune	10.19%	4th
Bea	2	"Tá Vendo Aquela Lua"	8.52	10th	Bottom Three	4.03%	13th
Talíz	3	"Apaga a Luz"	8.77	7th	Safe	5.56%	9th
Janício	4	"Espumas Ao Vento"	8.93	5th	Safe	5.22%	11th
Biahh	5	"Cobaia"	8.54	9th	Bottom Three	6.37%	8th
Sudário	6	"Separação"	9.03	4th	Safe	13.99%	Hitmaker
Thainá	7	"És o Maior (You're Bigger)"	9.30	1st	Night Winner	8.27%	5th
Daniel	8	"Fix You"	Non-competitive		Immune	10.96%	2nd
Gabriel	9	"Escreve Aí"	8.72	8th	Safe	10.70%	3rd
Nirah	10	"K.O."	8.29	11th	Eliminated	Unreleased	
Hanii	11	"A Lua e Eu"	9.07	3rd	Safe	7.22%	6th
Camille	12	"Halo"	9.24	2nd	Safe	7.03%	7th
Ruama	13	"Alô Porteiro"	8.85	6th	Safe	5.08%	12th
Brenno	14	"Vai Sacudir, Vai Abalar"	Non-competitive		Jingle Winner	5.38%	10th

==== Week 2 ====
Duel
Artist	Order	Song	Score	Rank	Result	Streams	Rank
Bea	1	"Exagerado"	8.87	—	Safe	Unreleased	
Hanii	2	"Não Aprendi a Dizer Adeus"	9.56	1st	Duel Winner	Unreleased	
Top 13 Festival
Biahh	1	"Dormi na Praça"	Non-competitive		Jingle Winner	5.88%	9th
Janício	2	"Asa Branca"	8.53	9th	Bottom Three	3.61%	11th
Gabriel	3	"Volta pra Mim"	8.54	8th	Bottom Three	8.89%	5th
Juceir	4	"Perfect"	9.03	3rd	Safe	15.10%	2nd
Bea	5	"Teu Segredo"	8.72	6th	Safe	4.62%	10th
Brenno	6	"Resposta"	Non-competitive		Stage Owner	6.19%	8th
Camille	7	"Não Quero Mais"	8.61	7th	Safe	3.99%	11th
Ruama	8	"Flor e o Beija-Flor"	8.45	10th	Eliminated	Unreleased	
Daniel	9	"Único"	8.82	4th	Safe	13.15%	3rd
Talíz	10	"If I Ain't Got You"	8.81	5th	Safe	8.99%	4th
Thainá	11	"Fim de Tarde"	9.19	1st	Night Winner	6.64%	6th
Sudário	12	"Péssimo Negócio"	9.13	2nd	Safe	16.53%	Hitmaker
Hanii	13	"Radar"	Non-competitive		Duel Winner	6.40%	7th

==== Week 3 ====
Duel
Artist	Order	Song	Score	Rank	Result	Streams	Rank
Gabriel	1	"Do Seu Lado"	9.05	—	Safe	Unreleased	
Janício	2	"Tente Outra Vez"	9.21	1st	Duel Winner	Unreleased	
Top 12 Festival
Janício	1	"Gostoso Demais"	Non-competitive		Duel Winner	3.96%	11th
Sudário	2	"Não Deixe o Samba Morrer"	8.77	6th	Safe	16.61%	2nd
Juceir	3	"Morena"	8.85	3rd	Safe	20.06%	Hitmaker
Biahh	4	"Shallow"	8.71	8th	Bottom Three	8.86%	5th
Gabriel	5	"Pense em Mim"	8.73	7th	Safe	9.38%	4th
Bea	6	"Até que Durou"	8.65	10th	Bottom Three	7.11%	7th
Talíz	7	"Fora da Lei"	8.70	9th	Eliminated	Unreleased	
Brenno	8	"Apenas Mais Uma de Amor"	8.82	4th	Safe	4.59%	9th
Camille	9	"Olhos Coloridos"	8.99	2nd	Safe	4.27%	10th
Daniel	10	"Como É Grande o Meu Amor Por Você"	Non-competitive		Stage Owner	7.16%	6th
Hanii	11	"Me Bloqueia"	8.79	5th	Safe	6.87%	8th
Thainá	12	"Pai Eu Não Confio em Mim"	9.05	1st	Night Winner	11.12%	3rd

==== Week 4 ====
Duel
Artist	Order	Song	Score	Rank	Result	Streams	Rank
Brenno	1	"Meu Erro"	9.11	—	Safe	Unreleased	
Janício	2	"Final Feliz"	9.31	1st	Duel Winner	Unreleased	
Top 11 Festival
Camille	1	"Esse Brilho é Meu"	Non-competitive		Jingle Winner	2.90%	9th
Juceir	2	"Eu Sei Que Vou Te Amar"	8.92	3rd	Safe	23.11%	Hitmaker
Thainá	3	"I Have Nothing"	8.99	1st	Night Winner	9.66%	5th
Brenno	4	"Não Precisa Mudar"	8.59	7th	Eliminated	Unreleased	
Hanii	5	"Zero a Cem"	8.67	5th	Safe	6.76%	6th
Biahh	6	"Hackearam-me"	8.55	8th	Bottom Three	10.13%	4th
Daniel	7	"Ousado Amor (Reckless Love)"	Non-competitive		Stage Owner	5.85%	7th
Bea	8	"Eu Juro"	8.62	6th	Bottom Three	2.73%	10th
Gabriel	9	"Humilde Residência"	8.79	4th	Safe	11.08%	3rd
Sudário	10	"Coração Em Desalinho"	8.95	2nd	Safe	22.15%	2nd
Janício	11	"De Volta pro Aconchego"	Non-competitive		Duel Winner	5.63%	8th
Top 10 Festival
Sudário	1	"Sinais"	8.716	6th	Safe	17.12%	2nd
Bea	2	"A Loba"	8.805	4th	Safe	2.64%	7th
Hanii	3	"Retratos e Canções"	8.819	3rd	Safe	1.94%	9th
Juceir	4	"Careless Whisper"	8.969	1st	Night Winner	14.10%	3rd
Janício	5	"Ai Que Saudade D'Ocê"	8.704	8th	Bottom Three	3.36%	6th
Thainá	6	"Até Que o Senhor Venha"	8.783	5th	Safe	3.91%	5th
Camille	7	"Se Eu Não Te Amasse Tanto Assim"	8.709	7th	Bottom Three	2.09%	8th
Biahh	8	"Any Man of Mine"	8.907	2nd	Safe	6.85%	4th
Gabriel	9	"Na Hora da Raiva"	8.683	9th	Eliminated	Unreleased	
Daniel	10	"Planeta Água"	Non-competitive		Jingle Winner	47.99%	Hitmaker

==== Week 5 ====
Duel
Artist	Order	Song	Score	Rank	Result	Streams	Rank
Camille	1	"Força Estranha"	9.33	1st	Duel Winner	Unreleased	
Thainá	2	"É o Amor"	8.98	—	Safe	Unreleased	
Top 9 Festival
Bea	1	"É Tarde Demais"	Non-competitive		Stage Owner	1.99%	8th
Thainá	2	"Listen"	8.91	4th	Safe	7.65%	4th
Janício	3	"A Vida do Viajante"	8.72	6th	Bottom Three	7.03%	6th
Biahh	4	"Diz Pra Mim (Just Give Me a Reason)"	8.56	7th	Eliminated	Unreleased	
Hanii	5	"Você Me Vira a Cabeça (Me Tira do Sério)"	9.14	1st	Night Winner	7.04%	5th
Sudário	6	"Desafio"	8.73	5th	Bottom Three	31.74%	Hitmaker
Juceir	7	"Can't Stop the Feeling!"	9.09	2nd	Safe	21.41%	2nd
Daniel	8	"O Escudo"	8.99	3rd	Safe	20.46%	3rd
Camille	9	"Best Part"	Non-competitive		Duel Winner	2.68%	7th

==== Week 6 ====
Duel
Artist	Order	Song	Score	Rank	Result	Streams	Rank
Janício	1	"Além do Horizonte"	8.96	—	Safe	Unreleased	
Juceir	2	"Oceano"	9.44	1st	Duel Winner	Unreleased	
Top 8 Festival
Juceir	1	"Anjo"	Non-competitive		Duel Winner	Unreleased	
Camille	2	"Ritmo Perfeito"	8.89	6th	Eliminated	Unreleased	
Hanii	3	"Love On Top"	9.23	1st	Night Winner	Unreleased	
Thainá	4	"Tudo Que Eu Sou"	8.96	4th	Bottom Four	Unreleased	
Janício	5	"Tropicana (Morena Tropicana)"	9.08	2nd	Safe	Unreleased	
Bea	6	"Temporal"	8.92	5th	Eliminated	Unreleased	
Daniel	7	"Love of My Life"	9.06	3rd	Bottom Four	Unreleased	
Sudário	8	"Atrasadinha"	Non-competitive		Stage Owner	Unreleased	
Top 6 Festival
Janício	1	"Frevo Mulher"	8.797	5th	Eliminated	Unreleased	
Sudário	2	"O Show Tem Que Continuar"	8.696	6th	Eliminated	Unreleased	
Thainá	3	"Bondade de Deus (Goodness of God)"	9.112	3rd	Bottom Four	Unreleased	
Hanii	4	"Como Nossos Pais"	9.191	1st	Night Winner	Unreleased	
Juceir	5	"La Barca"	9.114	2nd	Safe	Unreleased	
Daniel	6	"Escape"	8.971	4th	Bottom Four	Unreleased	
Final Festival – Night 1
Daniel	1	"Não Mais Escravos (No Longer Slaves)"	9.03	4th	Safe	Unreleased	
Thainá	2	"Better Days"	9.29	2nd	Safe	Unreleased	
Juceir	3	"Amor Pra Recomeçar"	9.26	3rd	Safe	Unreleased	
Hanii	4	"I Will Always Love You"	9.48	1st	Night Winner	Unreleased	
Final Festival – Night 2
Daniel	1	"Vitorioso És (Victory Is Yours)"	8.98	4th	Fourth place 27.23	Unreleased	
Daniel	5	"Hallelujah"	9.22	4th	Fourth place 27.23	Unreleased	
Hanii	2	"Um Dia de Domingo"	9.22	2nd	Runner-up; 27.98	Unreleased	
Hanii	6	"Superstition"	9.28	2nd	Runner-up; 27.98	Unreleased	
Juceir	3	"Aguenta Coração"	9.24	3rd	Third place 27.90	Unreleased	
Juceir	7	"Alma Gêmea"	9.40	3rd	Third place 27.90	Unreleased	
Thainá	4	"O Maior Vilão Sou Eu"	9.32	1st	Winner; 28.09	Unreleased	
Thainá	8	"That's What Friends Are For"	9.48	1st	Winner; 28.09	Unreleased	

== Guest appearances ==
Each Festival, a panel of three celebrity guest judges evaluates the performances of the bottom three contestants and, after deliberation, saves one from elimination.

Week 1

- Dinho Ouro Preto
- Fafá de Belém
- Pretinho da Serrinha

Week 2

- Hamilton de Holanda
- Lucy Alves
- Xande de Pilares

Week 3

- João Carlos Martins
- Léo Jaime
- Lexa

Week 4 – Top 11

- Regis Danese
- Sandra de Sá
- Tico Santa Cruz

Week 4 – Top 10

- Dilsinho
- João Marcello Bôscoli
- Roberta Miranda

Week 5

- Dennis DJ
- Jorge Vercillo
- Teresa Cristina

Week 6 – Top 8

- Guto Graça Mello
- Paulinho Moska
- Priscilla

Week 6 – Top 6

- Gustavo Mioto
- Liminha
- Zizi Possi

== Ratings and reception ==
=== Brazilian ratings ===
All numbers are in points and provided by Kantar Ibope Media.

Week	First air date	Last air date	Timeslot (BRT)	Daily SP viewers (in points)							SP viewers (in points)	BR viewers (in points)	Ref.
Week	First air date	Last air date	Timeslot (BRT)	Mon	Tue	Wed	Thu	Fri	Sat	Sun	SP viewers (in points)	BR viewers (in points)	Ref.
1	August 25, 2025	August 31, 2025	Monday to Saturday; 10:30 p.m. Wednesday; 11:45 p.m. Sunday; 11:30 p.m.	16.6	15.7	9.4	14.6	16.0	14.7	8.7	13.7	Outside top 10	
2	September 1, 2025	September 7, 2025	Monday to Saturday; 10:30 p.m. Wednesday; 11:45 p.m. Sunday; 11:30 p.m.	17.3	16.7	14.5	13.8	15.4	15.3	9.7	14.7	Outside top 10	
3	September 8, 2025	September 14, 2025	Monday to Saturday; 10:30 p.m. Wednesday; 11:45 p.m. Sunday; 11:30 p.m.	15.3	12.6	9.4	9.3	15.7	14.3	8.2	12.1	Outside top 10	
4	September 15, 2025	September 21, 2025	Monday to Saturday; 10:30 p.m. Wednesday; 11:45 p.m. Sunday; 11:30 p.m.	13.5	13.8	8.8	12.4	14.1	13.9	8.2	12.1	Outside top 10	
5	September 22, 2025	September 28, 2025	Monday to Saturday; 10:30 p.m. Wednesday; 11:45 p.m. Sunday; 11:30 p.m.	14.1	13.0	9.6	12.7	15.2	15.1	10.0	12.8	Outside top 10	
6	September 29, 2025	October 5, 2025	Monday to Saturday; 10:30 p.m. Wednesday; 11:45 p.m. Sunday; 11:30 p.m.	15.8	14.8	7.8	13.9	15.5	15.3	8.6	13.1	Outside top 10	
7	October 6, 2025	October 6, 2025	Monday to Saturday; 10:30 p.m. Wednesday; 11:45 p.m. Sunday; 11:30 p.m.	15.3	—	—	—	—	—	—	15.3	Outside top 10	

- In 2025, each point represents 270.631 households in 15 market cities in Brazil (77.488 households in São Paulo).
