= Estrelas da Casa season 3 =

Estrelas da Casa
- Season 3
- Hosted by: Ana Clara Lima
- Winners: Simples Detalhe (David Natel, Hanaya, Vick Nunes and Uel)
- Runners-up: Lúmina (Bruno Gadiol, Leonna, Paula Tavares and Yudchi)
- No. of episodes: 31

Release
- Original network: TV Globo
- Original release: August 25 – September 24, 2026

The third season of the Brazilian singing competition series Estrela da Casa (branded Estrelas da Casa) premiered on August 25, 2026, on TV Globo, across 31 episodes, hosted by Ana Clara Lima. Singers Belo and Junior served as mentors, Anitta acted as an advisor, KondZilla helped contestants build a digital following, and dancer Alline Azevedo oversaw physical preparation. Vocal coach Nina Pancevski, music producers Alexandre Castilho and Vinicius Rosa, and vocal arranger Bruno Oliveira also joined the production team.

For this season the format was overhauled: rather than crowning a single winner, the goal was to form two musical groups, one in the Pop style and one in the Pagode style, with only one of them ultimately winning the season.

On September 24, 2026, the Pagode group Simples Detalhe (David Natel, Hanaya, Vick Nunes and Uel) won the competition with 56.47% of the public vote, defeating the Pop group Lúmina (Bruno Gadiol, Leonna, Paula Tavares and Yudchi), which finished as runner-up.

== Format ==
The season began with a public vote on gshow to choose two of the 24 official contestants directly — one man and one woman for each style. The other 20 were chosen by the mentors, resulting in 12 contestants in each musical style (Pop and Pagode). Within each style, mentors Belo and Junior formed the line-ups themselves; contestants could not choose to switch groups. Although Festival performances were made in groups, eliminations up until the semi-final were individual and split by gender and by style: each elimination night, one man and one woman from Pop and one man and one woman from Pagode left the competition. As a result, the pre-set line-ups changed after every elimination cycle, with the mentors reorganizing the remaining contestants each Friday.

From the quarterfinal round onward (Festival #3 on September 15 and Festival #4 on September 17), each contestant performed as part of a finalized group rather than as an individual, and eliminations were decided by group instead of individually. Two finalized formations from each style advanced to the semi-final; in the grand final, the top Pop group faced the top Pagode group in a public vote that determined the season's winning group.

=== Weekly dynamic ===
- Monday: rehearsals at the Training Center and live segments on Multishow's TVZ.
- Tuesday: live "Clássicos" (Classics) show performing cover songs; public voting opens on gshow.
- Wednesday: evaluation of social-media challenges set by KondZilla; contestants attend a taping of Estúdio Backstage on Multishow.
- Thursday: live Festival shows and elimination night.
- Friday: Belo and Junior reorganize the teams for the following week's rehearsals.

=== Voting ===
Each cycle, contestants performed divided into groups (men's, women's, and mixed), while the public voted for their favorite man and woman of each style. The four most-voted contestants (one man and one woman from each style) secured their place in the competition, with the mentors and advisor Anitta making the final call on who else would be eliminated. Individual voting continued through the quarterfinal; from the semi-final onward, the public voted by group instead.

=== Prize ===
On the premiere episode, Ana Clara revealed the winning group's prize would start at R$400,000, held in a Mercado Pago savings account (the season's sponsoring digital bank) and accruing interest until the finale. Due to that return, plus a bonus tied to the winning group's share of the public vote, the final prize was updated to R$460,000.

== Contestants ==
Contestant	Age	Hometown	Style	Group formed	Result
David Natel	27	Porto Alegre, Rio Grande do Sul	Pagode	Simples Detalhe	Winner (September 24, 2026)
Hanaya	23	Valença, Bahia	Pagode	Simples Detalhe	Winner (September 24, 2026)
Uel	26	Salvador, Bahia	Pagode	Simples Detalhe	Winner (September 24, 2026)
Vick Nunes	27	Rio de Janeiro	Pagode	Simples Detalhe	Winner (September 24, 2026)
Bruno Gadiol	28	São Paulo	Pop	Lúmina	Runner-up (September 24, 2026)
Leonna	19	Águas Claras, Federal District	Pop	Lúmina	Runner-up (September 24, 2026)
Paula Tavares	24	Rio de Janeiro	Pop	Lúmina	Runner-up (September 24, 2026)
Yudchi	26	Osasco, São Paulo	Pop	Lúmina	Runner-up (September 24, 2026)
Cinara	22	Salvador, Bahia	Pop	Eliminated (September 22, 2026)	
Esther Nunes	26	Macaé, Rio de Janeiro	Pagode	Eliminated (September 22, 2026)	
Julliana Franco	30	Belém, Pará	Pagode	Eliminated (September 22, 2026)	
Tori	29	Teresina, Piauí	Pop	Eliminated (September 22, 2026)	
Álec	24	Ananindeua, Pará	Pop	Eliminated (September 17, 2026)	
Gabriel Nandes	29	Anápolis, Goiás	Pop	Eliminated (September 17, 2026)	
Jefinho	31	São Gonçalo, Rio de Janeiro	Pagode	Eliminated (September 17, 2026)	
Lukinhas	29	Rio de Janeiro	Pagode	Eliminated (September 17, 2026)	
Bruna Bento	23	Nova Friburgo, Rio de Janeiro	Pagode	Eliminated (September 10, 2026)	
Dan Ferrera	23	Mar Vermelho, Alagoas	Pagode	Eliminated (September 10, 2026)	
Emma	28	Salvador, Bahia	Pop	Eliminated (September 10, 2026)	
Filgueira	23	Goianinha, Rio Grande do Norte	Pop	Eliminated (September 10, 2026)	
Arthur Belmonte	29	Contagem, Minas Gerais	Pagode	Eliminated (September 3, 2026)	
Enzo Cespom	23	Rio de Janeiro	Pop	Eliminated (September 3, 2026)	
Japa	27	Aparecida de Goiânia, Goiás	Pagode	Eliminated (September 3, 2026)	
Laura Schadeck	23	Porto Alegre, Rio Grande do Sul	Pop	Eliminated (September 3, 2026)	
Arissa	30	São Gonçalo, Rio de Janeiro	Pagode	Not selected (August 27, 2026)	
Dandara Luanda	20	Bom Jesus da Lapa, Bahia	Pagode	Not selected (August 27, 2026)	
Marquinho	34	Ribeirão Preto, São Paulo	Pagode	Not selected (August 27, 2026)	
Oliveira	25	São Gonçalo, Rio de Janeiro	Pagode	Not selected (August 27, 2026)	
Momô	30	Vilhena, Rondônia	Pop	Not selected (August 25, 2026)	
Peu Heise	22	Piracicaba, São Paulo	Pop	Not selected (August 25, 2026)	
Rob Miranda	22	Campinas, São Paulo	Pop	Not selected (August 25, 2026)	
Vana J	18	Rio de Janeiro	Pop	Not selected (August 25, 2026)	

== Results summary ==
Key

Saved by the public vote
Saved by the mentor
Not selected / at risk
Eliminated

Contestant	Style	Premiere (Aug 25/27)	Festival #1 (Sept 3)	Festival #2 (Sept 10)	Quarterfinal (Sept 15–17)	Semi-final (Sept 22)	Final (Sept 24)
David Natel	Pagode	Saved by mentor	Saved by mentor	Saved by mentor	Saved by mentor	Safe	Winner
Hanaya	Pagode	Saved by mentor	Saved by mentor	Saved by mentor	Saved by mentor	Safe	Winner
Uel	Pagode	Saved by public	Saved by public	Saved by public	Saved by mentor	Safe	Winner
Vick Nunes	Pagode	Saved by mentor	Saved by mentor	Saved by mentor	Saved by mentor	Safe	Winner
Bruno Gadiol	Pop	Saved by mentor	Saved by mentor	Saved by public	Saved by mentor	Safe	Runner-up
Leonna	Pop	Saved by mentor	Saved by mentor	Saved by mentor	Saved by mentor	Safe	Runner-up
Paula Tavares	Pop	Saved by mentor	Saved by mentor	Saved by mentor	Saved by mentor	Safe	Runner-up
Yudchi	Pop	Saved by mentor	Saved by mentor	Saved by mentor	Saved by mentor	Safe	Runner-up
Cinara	Pop	Saved by mentor	Saved by mentor	Saved by mentor	At risk	Eliminated (Sept 22)	
Esther Nunes	Pagode	Saved by mentor	Saved by mentor	Saved by mentor	Safe	Eliminated (Sept 22)	
Julliana Franco	Pagode	Saved by public	Saved by public	Saved by public	Safe	Eliminated (Sept 22)	
Tori	Pop	Saved by public	Saved by public	Saved by public	At risk	Eliminated (Sept 22)	
Álec	Pop	Saved by mentor	Saved by mentor	Saved by mentor	Eliminated (Sept 17)		
Gabriel Nandes	Pop	Saved by mentor	Saved by mentor	Saved by mentor	Eliminated (Sept 17)		
Jefinho	Pagode	Saved by mentor	Saved by mentor	Saved by mentor	Eliminated (Sept 17)		
Lukinhas	Pagode	Saved by mentor	Saved by mentor	Saved by mentor	Eliminated (Sept 17)		
Bruna Bento	Pagode	Saved by mentor	Saved by mentor	Eliminated (Sept 10)			
Dan Ferrera	Pagode	Saved by mentor	Saved by mentor	Eliminated (Sept 10)			
Emma	Pop	Saved by mentor	Saved by mentor	Eliminated (Sept 10)			
Filgueira	Pop	Saved by mentor	Saved by mentor	Eliminated (Sept 10)			
Arthur Belmonte	Pagode	Saved by mentor	Eliminated (Sept 3)				
Enzo Cespom	Pop	Saved by public	Eliminated (Sept 3)				
Japa	Pagode	Saved by mentor	Eliminated (Sept 3)				
Laura Schadeck	Pop	Saved by mentor	Eliminated (Sept 3)				
Arissa	Pagode	Not selected (Aug 27)					
Dandara Luanda	Pagode	Not selected (Aug 27)					
Marquinho	Pagode	Not selected (Aug 27)					
Oliveira	Pagode	Not selected (Aug 27)					
Momô	Pop	Not selected (Aug 25)					
Peu Heise	Pop	Not selected (Aug 25)					
Rob Miranda	Pop	Not selected (Aug 25)					
Vana J	Pop	Not selected (Aug 25)					

== Live shows ==
Key

Saved by the public
Saved by the mentor
Not selected
Eliminated

=== Pop premiere (August 25) ===
Sixteen Pop candidates performed for a spot in the official cast.

Group	Contestants	Song	Original artist
Mixed	Álec, Cinara, Tori, Yudchi	"Radar"	Gloria Groove
Women	Emma, Momô, Paula, Vana J	"APT."	Rosé and Bruno Mars
Men	Enzo, Filgueira, Gabriel, Rob	"Beautiful Things"	Benson Boone
Mixed	Bruno, Laura, Leonna, Peu	"Señorita"	Shawn Mendes and Camila Cabello

Result: Enzo Cespom and Tori were selected directly by the public vote. Bruno Gadiol, Leonna, Paula Tavares, Yudchi, Cinara, Álec, Gabriel Nandes, Emma, Filgueira and Laura Schadeck were chosen by mentor Junior. Momô, Peu Heise, Rob Miranda and Vana J were not selected to join the official cast.

=== Pagode premiere (August 27) ===
Sixteen Pagode candidates performed for a spot in the official cast.

Group	Contestants	Song	Original artist
Mixed	David, Hanaya, Japa, Jefinho	"Arrependidaço (Onde Você Anda)"	Ferrugem
Women	Bruna, Dandara, Esther, Vick	"Falta Você"	Thiaguinho
Mixed	Arissa, Dan, Julliana, Lukinhas	"Separação"	Exaltasamba
Men	Arthur, Marquinho, Oliveira, Uel	"Coração Partido (Corazón Partío)"	Menos É Mais

Result: Julliana Franco and Uel were selected directly by the public vote. David Natel, Hanaya, Vick Nunes, Esther Nunes, Jefinho, Lukinhas, Bruna Bento, Dan Ferrera, Arthur Belmonte and Japa were chosen by mentor Belo. Arissa, Dandara Luanda, Marquinho and Oliveira were not selected to join the official cast.

=== Classics #1 (September 1) ===
A non-elimination night of cover performances.

Style	Group	Contestants	Song	Original artist
Pagode	Men	Arthur, Dan, David, Uel	"Anna Júlia"	Los Hermanos
Pop	Mixed	Álec, Filgueira, Gabriel, Yudchi	"Morena Tropicana"	Alceu Valença
Pagode	Mixed	Esther, Jefinho, Lukinhas, Vick	"Final Feliz"	Jorge Vercillo
Pop	Mixed	Bruno, Enzo, Laura, Leonna	"Proibida Pra Mim (Grazon)"	Charlie Brown Jr.
Pagode	Women	Bruna, Hanaya, Japa, Julliana	"Espumas ao Vento"	Fagner
Pop	Women	Cinara, Emma, Paula, Tori	"Lilás"	Djavan

No one was eliminated this night.

=== Festival #1 (September 3) ===
Style	Group	Contestants	Song	Original artist
Pop	Men	Álec, Filgueira, Gabriel, Yudchi	"Finally"	CeCe Peniston
Pagode	Women	Bruna, Hanaya, Japa, Julliana	"Fulminante"	Mumuzinho
Pop	Women	Cinara, Emma, Paula, Tori	"Meu Talismã"	Iza
Pagode	Men	Arthur, Dan, David, Uel	"Fatalmente"	Rodriguinho
Pop	Mixed	Bruno, Enzo, Laura, Leonna	"Pilantra"	Jão and Anitta
Pagode	Mixed	Esther, Jefinho, Lukinhas, Vick	"Final de Tarde"	Péricles

Result: Arthur Belmonte, Enzo Cespom, Japa and Laura Schadeck were eliminated — one man and one woman from each style.

=== Classics #2 (September 8) ===
A non-elimination night of cover performances.

Style	Group	Contestants	Song	Original artist
Pop	Men	Álec, Bruno, Filgueira, Gabriel, Yudchi	"Treasure"	Bruno Mars
Pagode	Women	Bruna, Esther, Hanaya, Julliana, Vick	"Ainda Bem"	Thiaguinho
Special performance		Junior and Gloria Groove	"fome"	Junior and Gloria Groove
Pop	Women	Cinara, Emma, Leonna, Paula, Tori	"Ritmo Perfeito"	Anitta
Pagode	Men	Dan, David, Jefinho, Lukinhas, Uel	"Sinais"	Sorriso Maroto
Special performance		Gloria Groove	"A Tua Voz/Radar"	Gloria Groove

=== Festival #2 (September 10) ===
Style	Group	Contestants	Song	Original artist
Pop	Women	Cinara, Emma, Leonna, Paula, Tori	"Bang Bang"	Jessie J, Ariana Grande and Nicki Minaj
Pagode	Women	Bruna, Esther, Hanaya, Julliana, Vick	"P do Pecado"	Menos É Mais and Simone Mendes
Pop	Men	Álec, Bruno, Filgueira, Gabriel, Yudchi	"TUDO"	Liniker
Pagode	Men	Dan, David, Jefinho, Lukinhas, Uel	"Deixa Acontecer"	Revelação
Pop	Mixed	Bruno, Emma, Leonna, Paula, Yudchi	"Zero a Cem"	Os Garotin
Pagode	Mixed	Dan, David, Esther, Hanaya, Vick	"Melhor Eu Ir"	Péricles
Pop	Mixed	Álec, Cinara, Filgueira, Gabriel, Tori	"Por Supuesto"	Marina Sena
Pagode	Mixed	Bruna, Jefinho, Julliana, Lukinhas, Uel	"Nosso Primeiro Beijo"	Gloria Groove

Result: Bruna Bento, Dan Ferrera, Emma and Filgueira were eliminated.

=== Festival #3 (September 15) ===
From this show onward, each contestant performed as part of a finalized group, and eliminations were decided by group rather than individually.

Style	Group	Contestants	Song	Original artist	Status
Pagode	Mixed 1	Esther, Jefinho, Julliana, Lukinhas	"Clareou"	Diogo Nogueira	At risk
Pagode	Mixed 2	David, Hanaya, Vick, Uel	"Me Perdoa"	Ferrugem and Iza	Safe
Pop	Mixed 1	Bruno, Leonna, Paula, Yudchi	"Crazy"	Gnarls Barkley	Safe
Pop	Mixed 2	Álec, Cinara, Gabriel, Tori	"Pesadão"	Iza	At risk

=== Festival #4 (September 17) ===
Style	Group	Contestants	Song	Original artist
Pop	Men	Álec, Bruno, Gabriel, Yudchi	"Toxic"	Britney Spears
Pop	Women	Cinara, Leonna, Paula, Tori	"Lady Marmalade"	Pink, Christina Aguilera, Lil' Kim and Mýa
Pagode	Women	Esther, Hanaya, Julliana, Vick	"Depois do Prazer"	Só Pra Contrariar
Pagode	Men	David, Jefinho, Lukinhas, Uel	"Eu Mereço Ser Feliz"	Mumuzinho

Result: Combining the two Festival nights, Bruno Gadiol, Leonna, Paula Tavares, Yudchi, Cinara and Tori (Pop) and David Natel, Hanaya, Vick Nunes, Uel, Esther Nunes and Julliana Franco (Pagode) advanced to the semi-final. Álec, Gabriel Nandes (Pop) and Jefinho, Lukinhas (Pagode) were eliminated.

=== Semi-final (September 22) ===
Style	Group	Contestants	Song	Original artist	Status
Pop	Mixed	Bruno, Leonna, Paula, Yudchi	"Don't Stop Me Now"	Queen	Safe
Pagode	Mixed	David, Hanaya, Vick, Uel	"Trovão"	Dilsinho	Safe
Pop	Women	Cinara, Leonna, Paula, Tori	"Wannabe"	Spice Girls	Eliminated
Pagode	Women	Esther, Hanaya, Julliana, Vick	"Sinto Sua Falta"	Ferrugem	Eliminated

Result: The mixed formations — Bruno Gadiol, Leonna, Paula Tavares and Yudchi (Pop) and David Natel, Hanaya, Vick Nunes and Uel (Pagode) — advanced to the final as Lúmina and Simples Detalhe respectively. Cinara and Tori (Pop) and Esther Nunes and Julliana Franco (Pagode) were eliminated.

=== Final (September 24) ===
Style	Group	Contestants	Cover song	Original single	Result
Pagode	Simples Detalhe	David Natel, Hanaya, Vick Nunes, Uel	"Coração Radiante" (Grupo Revelação)	"Dia D"	Winner (56.47%)
Pop	Lúmina	Bruno Gadiol, Leonna, Paula Tavares, Yudchi	"Believer" (Imagine Dragons)	"Quem Não Vai Querer"	Runner-up (43.53%)

Result: Simples Detalhe (David Natel, Hanaya, Vick Nunes and Uel) won the third season of Estrelas da Casa with 56.47% of the public vote, against 43.53% for Lúmina (Bruno Gadiol, Leonna, Paula Tavares and Yudchi).
