= Caipira music =

Caipira
- Cultural origins: Brazilian colonial period, actual region of São Paulo
- Typical instruments: Caipira guitar

Subgenres
- Caipira pagode; Caipira samba; Sertanejo

Caipira is a musical style of the Caipira culture, which originated in São Paulo, during the period of Portuguese colonization. The theme of the Caipira style, performed mainly to the accompaniment of a Caipira guitar, is especially based on life in the countryside or sertão, where Caipira culture first developed. The first Caipira music group emerged in 1924, the Turma Caipira, created by the folklorist Cornélio Pires, being composed in its first phase by Arlindo Santana, Sebastião Ortiz de Camargo, Zico Dias, Ferrinho, Mariano da Silva, Caçula and Olegário José de Godoy, all from Piracicaba.

== Etymology ==
The name is a reference to the Caipiras, a people. The term "Caipira" comes from the Paulista language, originating from Tupi language. There are several theories about the true origin of the term.

- Kai (burnt) + pira (skin) = originally describing sun-darkened skin, a reference to Caipiras Caboclos.
- Kaa (jungle) + pora (inhabitant) = inhabitant of the jungle.

== History ==
At the end of the 1920s, caipira music was recorded for the first time, based on recordings made by the journalist and writer Cornélio Pires of "tales" and fragments of traditional songs from the interior of the state of São Paulo. At the time of these pioneering recordings, whose lyrics evoke the lifestyle of the country man (often in opposition to man's life in the city) and the bucolic beauty of the landscape and romantic countryside, with emphasized words in daily life and manner of singing). Beyond Cornelio Pires and his "Caipira Gang" stood out in this trend, recording at a later time, the duo Mandi & Sorocabinha, Alvarenga & Ranchinho, and Florencio Torres, Tonico & Tinoco, Vieira & Vieirinha, among others, and popular songs like "Sergio Forero", by Cornelio Pires, "Bonde Camarão" by Cornelio Pires and Mariano, "Sertão do Laranjinha" by Pires and Ariovaldo and "Cabocla Teresa", by João Pires and Ariovaldo Pacifico.

The introduction of the electric guitar and pop music influences by duo Leo Canhoto e Robertinho in the late 1960s marked the start of Sertanejo music, giving rise to a new subgenre, separating itself from Caipira music and graduating as one of the most popular musical styles in Brazil. During the 1980s, there was a mass commercial exploitation of sertanejo, coupled in some cases, to a rereading of international hits and even the Jovem Guarda's. Against this trend, names like the duo Pena Branca e Xavantinho reappeared, adapting to the language of MPB success of guitars, and new artists emerged like Almir Sater, a sophisticated guitar player, who moved among the styles of guitar and the blues. In the following decade, a new generation of Caipira artists, including Roberto Correa, Ivan Vilela, Pereira da Viola, and Chico Lobo e Miltinho Edilberto, emerged who were willing to reunite the Caipira traditions.

== Traditional styles ==
=== Moda de viola ===
"Cantar é meu destino," song recorded in 2021 by Zequinha da Viola

The moda de viola, is an expression of Caipira music that stands out as its greatest example, among other rhythms and styles formed from toadas, cantigas, viras, canas-verdes, valsinhas and modinhas, a union of European and Indigenous influences. Viola modas are usually sung in two voices, like a recitative, where the singer has to tell a story. The melody is loose, as if it were spoken poetry with musical accompaniment. The first modas de viola were recorded in the early 1930s, following the pioneering work of Cornélio Pires.

=== Catira/Cateretê ===
Catira, also known as cateretê, is one of the most popular representations of São Paulo folklore, traditionally performed by men and boys, organized in two opposing rows. The beginning is given by the Caipira guitar player who plays the rasqueado, specific rhythmic touches, for the dancers to do the escova, a movement in which there is a rapid beating of the hands and feet accompanied by jumps. Despite the traditional male presence, some groups, such as the Du Catira Family, from Itapevi, in Greater São Paulo, have made room for girls and women.

=== Caipira pagode ===
Caipira pagode, also like pagode de viola and batidão, is a variant of Caipira music originating in the state of Paraná, South of Brazil. This style, created by Tião Carreiro in Maringá in 1959, is an offshoot of the catira rhythm, the former played with the guitar and the latter with the Caipira guitar, and is commonly accompanied by the cipó preto rhythm, which can be played on the viola caipira itself or, in most cases, on the guitar. It has no connection with pagode, a subgenre of samba, from Rio de Janeiro.

=== Caipira samba ===
This subgenre emerged in São Paulo, originating from the fusion of the old customs of the black communities with caipira culture, and was mainly performed at Catholic religious events. Like Caipira pagode, the Caipira samba also has no cultural connections with Brazilian samba, which is a developed genre in Bahia and Rio de Janeiro and quite popular during Brazilian Carnival.

=== Cururu ===
It was born in São Paulo, in religious singing, and could be sung in verses and challenges by Caipira guitar players. Cururu only became nationally known when it was brought to the public by Cornélio Pires in 1910. At religious festivals, it is sung and danced only by boys and men.
