= Estrela da Casa season 1 =

Estrela da Casa
- Season 1
- Hosted by: Ana Clara
- Winner: Lucca
- Runner-up: Matheus Torres
- No. of episodes: 50

Release
- Original network: TV Globo
- Original release: August 13 – October 1, 2024

Season chronology
- Next → Season 2

The first season of the Brazilian singing competition series Estrela da Casa premiered on TV Globo on August 13, 2024. It was hosted by Ana Clara.

The winner received R$1 million, a recording contract with Universal Music, career management, a nationwide tour, and the inclusion of a song in the soundtrack of the primetime telenovela Mania de Você. The cash prize, initially set at R$500.000, was later increased to R$750.000 and ultimately to R$1 million during the finale through a promotion sponsored by Mercado Pago.

On October 1, 2024, sertanejo singer Lucca won the competition with 41.13% of the final vote, over Matheus Torres (34.82%), Unna X (15.36%), and Leidy Murilho (8.69%), who finished second, third, and fourth, respectively.

The season struggled with low ratings in 2024, prompting the exit of lead director Boninho. TV Globo dismissed cancellation rumors and announced a revamped second season for 2025, with Michel Teló joining as a mentor.

== Format ==
Fourteen contestants live together in a House, developing their vocal skills, stage presence, and artistry. Each week, they promote pre-recorded singles, with the most successful earning the Hitmaker title and a Festival spot. Contestants compete in the Star challenge, where experts evaluate their industry knowledge; the winner becomes Star of the Week, gaining immunity, a Festival performance, and the power to nominate two contestants for the Duel, where the nominees compete live, with viewers saving one and the other facing elimination.

The Stage Owner title also grants immunity, a Festival spot, and the power to nominate one contestant for elimination, while a house vote nominates another. During the Festival, the three nominees perform, and viewers save their favorite; the least voted contestant is eliminated.

== Contestants ==
The fourteen artists were officially revealed on August 8, 2024. Two days later, Muse Maya was disqualified due to contractual issues and replaced by Thália.

Artist	Age	Hometown	Musical style	Original intro song	Result
Heloísa Araújo	23	Porto Real do Colégio	Sertanejo	"Não Desiste de Mim"	Eliminated 1st
Rodrigo Garcia	24	Manaus	Piseiro	"Agora Eu Pego Mesmo"	Eliminated 2nd
Califfa	31	Rio de Janeiro	Trap	"Antares"	Eliminated 3rd
Ramalho	23	Jacareí	Rap	"Sonho de Malandro"	Eliminated 4th
Nick Cruz	26	Serra	Pop	"Tava Na Cara"	Eliminated 5th
Thália	21	Rio de Janeiro	R&B	"Pega a Visão"	Eliminated 6th
MC Mayarah	29	Rio de Janeiro	Funk	"Nem Vem Pensar"	Eliminated 7th
Gael Vicci	18	Cachoeiras de Macacu	Pop	"No Pique"	Eliminated 8th
Nicole Louise	22	Brasília	Pop	"Garçom Dança Comigo"	Eliminated 9th
Evellin	33	Ipatinga	Sertanejo	"Troca de Carro"	Eliminated 10th
Leidy Murilho	38	Linhares	Gospel pop	"Andar Contigo"	Fourth place
Unna X	26	Taguatinga	Electropop	"Replay"	Third place
Matheus Torres	31	Belo Horizonte	Pop rock	"Pode Ser"	Runner-up
Lucca	27	Goiânia	Sertanejo	"Vinho Rosé"	Winner

== Results summary ==
=== Elimination chart ===
	Week 1	Week 2	Week 3	Week 4	Week 5	Week 6	Week 7	
	Week 1	Week 2	Week 3	Week 4	Week 5	Week 6	Day 45	Finale
Star of the Week	Gael	Mayarah	Ramalho	Gael	Unna	Gael	Lucca	(none)
Duel	Heloísa; 42.42% to save	Matheus; 61.87% to save	Matheus; 75.48% to save	Leidy; 38.55% to save	Lucca; 75.45% to save	Lucca; 45.08% to save	Leidy; 62.01% to save	(none)
Duel	Heloísa; 42.42% to save	Matheus; 61.87% to save	Matheus; 75.48% to save	Leidy; 38.55% to save	Lucca; 75.45% to save	Lucca; 45.08% to save	Nicole; 24.60% to save	(none)
Duel	Luca; 57.58% to save	Unna; 38.13% to save	Nicole; 24.52% to save	Lucca; 61.45% to save	Nick; 24.55% to save	Matheus; 54.92% to save	Nicole; 24.60% to save	(none)
Duel	Luca; 57.58% to save	Unna; 38.13% to save	Nicole; 24.52% to save	Lucca; 61.45% to save	Nick; 24.55% to save	Matheus; 54.92% to save	Gael; 13.39% to save	(none)
Stage Owner	Nick	Thália	Unna	Thália	Gael	Matheus	Unna	(none)
Nomination (Stage Owner)	Leidy	Lucca	Nick	Matheus	Matheus	Mayarah	Evellin; Leidy; Matheus; Nicole	(none)
Nomination (House)	Nicole	Rodrigo	Califfa	Ramalho	Leidy	Evellin	Evellin; Leidy; Matheus; Nicole	(none)
Lucca	Califfa	Rodrigo	Califfa	Ramalho; Mayarah	Mayarah	Leidy to save	Star of the Week	Winner (Day 50)
Matheus	Thália	Rodrigo	Califfa	Ramalho; Mayarah	Mayarah	Evellin	Battle	Runner-up (Day 50)
Unna	Ramalho	Rodrigo	Califfa	Mayarah; Ramalho	Star of the Week	Evellin to save	Stage Owner	Third place (Day 50)
Leidy	Ramalho	Rodrigo	Califfa	Mayarah; Ramalho	Mayarah	Unna to save	Battle	Fourth place (Day 50)
Evellin	Nicole	Rodrigo	Leidy	Nicole; Nick	Leidy	Unna to save	Battle	Eliminated (Day 48)
Nicole	Ramalho	Rodrigo	Califfa	Ramalho; Mayarah	Mayarah	Thália to save	Battle	Eliminated (Day 48)
Gael	Star of the Week	Rodrigo	Califfa	Star of the Week	Leidy	Star of the Week	Eliminated (Day 46)	
Mayarah	Nicole	Star of the Week	Leidy	Unna; Nicole	Leidy	Thália to save	Eliminated (Day 43)	
Thália	Nicole	Stage Owner	Leidy	Ramalho	Leidy	Nicole to save	Eliminated (Day 43)	
Nick	Stage Owner	Rodrigo	Leidy	Unna; Nicole	Leidy	Eliminated (Day 36)		
Ramalho	Nicole	Rodrigo	Star of the Week	Nicole; Unna	Eliminated (Day 28)			
Califfa	Nicole	Rodrigo	Leidy	Eliminated (Day 22)				
Rodrigo	Nicole	Leidy	Eliminated (Day 15)					
Heloísa	Ramalho	Eliminated (Day 8)						
Notes	1	none	2	3	4	5	6	none
Battle	Heloísa; Leidy; Nicole	Lucca; Rodrigo; Unna	Califfa; Nick; Nicole	Leidy; Matheus; Ramalho	Leidy; Matheus; Nick	Evellin; Lucca; Mayarah; Thália	Evellin; Leidy; Matheus; Nicole	Leidy; Lucca; Matheus; Unna
Eliminated	Heloísa; 31.30% to save	Rodrigo; 16.65% to save	Califfa; 11.76% to save	Ramalho; 17.46% to save	Nick; 12.98% to save	Mayarah; 3.90% to save	Nicole; 8.0% to save	Leidy; 8.69% to win
Eliminated	Heloísa; 31.30% to save	Rodrigo; 16.65% to save	Califfa; 11.76% to save	Ramalho; 17.46% to save	Nick; 12.98% to save	Mayarah; 3.90% to save	Nicole; 8.0% to save	Unna; 15.36% to win
Eliminated	Heloísa; 31.30% to save	Rodrigo; 16.65% to save	Califfa; 11.76% to save	Ramalho; 17.46% to save	Nick; 12.98% to save	Thália; 12.72% to save	Evellin; 11.28% to save	Unna; 15.36% to win
Eliminated	Heloísa; 31.30% to save	Rodrigo; 16.65% to save	Califfa; 11.76% to save	Ramalho; 17.46% to save	Nick; 12.98% to save	Thália; 12.72% to save	Evellin; 11.28% to save	Matheus; 34.82% to win
Survived	Nicole; 32.65% to save	Lucca; 36.03% to save	Nick; 33.01% to save	Leidy; 34.68% to save	Leidy; 31.65% to save	Evellin; 20.05% to save	Leidy; 26.82% to save	Lucca; 41.13% to win
Survived	Leidy; 36.05% to save	Unna; 47.32% to save	Nicole; 55.23% to save	Matheus; 47.86% to save	Matheus; 55.37% to save	Lucca; 63.33% to save	Matheus; 53.90% to save	Lucca; 41.13% to win

Notes

- ^Note 1: Rodrigo won the first challenge of the series, earning an additional immunity for the first week.
- ^Note 2: Califfa and Leidy each received five votes, resulting in a tie. The Stage Owner, Unna, was therefore required to break the tie and ultimately selected Califfa.
- ^Note 3: This week, each contestant was required to nominate two artists for the Battle. Mayarah and Ramalho each received five votes, resulting in a tie, and the Stage Owner, Thália, broke the tie by selecting Ramalho.
- ^Note 4: Leidy and Mayarah each received four votes, resulting in a tie. The Stage Owner, Gael, was therefore required to break the tie and ultimately selected Leidy.
- ^Note 5: This week, the vote was conducted secretly in the booth and aimed at saving artists. The Stage Owner, Matheus, had to decide which artist would enter the Battle among the tied artists with the fewest votes (Evellin, Leidy, and Nicole), ultimately selecting Evellin. Additionally, Lucca, the final Hitmaker of the season, nominated Thália for the Super Battle.
- ^Note 6: On Day 45, Lucca won the final Star Challenge, becoming Star of the Week and securing his place in the finale. The last Duel featured three artists, with the two nominees chosen by the Star of the Week selecting the third contestant (Leidy) by consensus. The contestant with the fewest votes was eliminated on Day 46. On Day 47, Unna won the final Stage Owner challenge, also earning a spot in the finale and automatically nominating Evellin, Leidy, Matheus, and Nicole for the Super Battle, where the two artists with the fewest votes were eliminated on Day 48.

=== Festival details ===
Key

Artist won the Star of the Week challenge and had to nominate two artists for the Duel.
Artist won the Duel and was immune for the week.
Artist won the Stage Owner challenge and had to nominate one artist for elimination.
Artist was nominated for the Battle and was at risk of elimination.
Artist's release received the highest number of streams and became the Hitmaker.
Artist received the fewest public votes and was eliminated.

==== Week 1 ====
Releases
Artist	Order	Song	Streams			Rank
Califfa	N/A	"Berenice"	61.267			12th
Evellin	N/A	"Não Aprendi a Dizer Adeus"	75.161			8th
Gael	N/A	"Ameianoite"	76.639			7th
Heloísa	N/A	"Mega Sena"	105.256			3rd
Leidy	N/A	"Deus da Minha Vida"	59.747			13th
Lucca	N/A	"Cuida Bem Dela"	133.381			Hitmaker
Matheus	N/A	"Partilhar"	71.997			10th
Mayarah	N/A	"Meu Talismã"	56.398			14th
Nick	N/A	"Não Quero Falar De Amor"	85.185			4th
Nicole	N/A	"Flowers"	126.636			2nd
Ramalho	N/A	"Levanta e Anda"	76.730			6th
Rodrigo	N/A	"Tropicana (Morena Tropicana)"	73.947			9th
Thália	N/A	"Até Que Durou"	67.399			11th
Unna	N/A	"Bem Que Se Quis"	80.890			5th
Artist	Order	Song	Public vote			Result
Artist	Order	Song	Single	Fan	Avg.	Result
Duel
Heloísa	1	"Medo Bobo"	45.58%	39.27%	42.42%	Battle
Lucca	2	"Evento Cancelado"	54.42%	60.73%	57.58%	Duel Winner
Festival
Heloísa	1	"Mega Sena"	25.68%	36.92%	31.30%	Eliminated
Leidy	2	"Deus da Minha Vida"	32.81%	39.29%	36.05%	Battle
Nicole	3	"Flowers"	41.51%	23.79%	32.65%	Battle
Gael	4	"Ameianoite"	Non-competitive			Star of the Week
Nick	5	"Não Quero Falar De Amor"	Non-competitive			Stage Owner
Lucca	6	"Cuida Bem Dela"	Non-competitive			Hitmaker

==== Week 2 ====
Releases
Artist	Order	Song	Streams			Rank
Califfa	N/A	"Final de Semana"	53.691			10th
Evellin	N/A	"Desejo Imortal (It Must Have Been Love)"	108.145			6th
Gael	N/A	"Quase Não Namoro"	614.726			3rd
Leidy	N/A	"Girassol"	83.298			7th
Lucca	N/A	"Caso Indefinido"	629.284			2nd
Matheus	N/A	"A Vida é Boa Com Você"	117.358			5th
Mayarah	N/A	"Chama Ela"	53.414			11th
Nick	N/A	"Carta Aberta"	75.044			8th
Nicole	N/A	"Melhor Sozinha"	319.987			4th
Ramalho	N/A	"Subirusdoistiozin"	49.464			12th
Rodrigo	N/A	"Não Digita"	53.908			9th
Thália	N/A	"Love Love"	47.726			13th
Unna	N/A	"Pilantra"	671.232			Hitmaker
Artist	Order	Song	Public vote			Result
Artist	Order	Song	Single	Fan	Avg.	Result
Duel
Matheus	1	"Por Você"	55.40%	68.35%	61.78%	Duel Winner
Unna	2	"Valerie"	44.60%	31.65%	38.13%	Battle
Festival
Lucca	1	"Caso Indefinido"	34.65%	37.42%	36.03%	Battle
Rodrigo	2	"Não Digita"	20.53%	12.77%	16.65%	Eliminated
Unna	3	"Pilantra"	44.82%	49.81%	47.32%	Battle
Mayarah	4	"Chama Ela"	Non-competitive			Star of the Week
Thália	5	"Love Love"	Non-competitive			Stage Owner

==== Week 3 ====
Releases
Artist	Order	Song	Streams			Rank
Califfa	N/A	"Cuidado"	33.574			12th
Evellin	N/A	"Deixa Eu"	116.529			5th
Gael	N/A	"Lança Perfume"	425.710			Hitmaker
Leidy	N/A	"Sabe Tudo"	41.446			9th
Lucca	N/A	"Checklist"	348.515			2nd
Matheus	N/A	"Como Uma Onda"	238.470			4th
Mayarah	N/A	"Minha Cura"	34.770			11th
Nick	N/A	"Voltei Pra Mim"	59.615			8th
Nicole	N/A	"Palhaça"	64.605			7th
Ramalho	N/A	"60k"	66.594			6th
Thália	N/A	"Vaga Lembrança"	38.327			10th
Unna	N/A	"A Tua Voz"	323.162			3rd
Artist	Order	Song	Public vote			Result
Artist	Order	Song	Single	Fan	Avg.	Result
Duel
Matheus	1	"Epitáfio"	70.37%	80.58%	75.48%	Duel Winner
Nicole	2	"A Lenda"	29.63%	19.42%	24.52%	Battle
Festival
Califfa	1	"Cuidado"	13.69%	9.83%	11.67%	Eliminated
Nick	2	"Voltei Pra Mim"	28.16%	37.85%	33.01%	Battle
Nicole	3	"Palhaça"	58.15%	52.32%	55.23%	Battle
Ramalho	4	"60k"	Non-competitive			Star of the Week
Unna	5	"A Tua Voz"	Non-competitive			Stage Owner
Gael	6	"Lança Perfume"	Non-competitive			Hitmaker

==== Week 4 ====
Releases
Artist	Order	Song	Streams			Rank
Evellin	N/A	"A Gente Se Entrega"	57.703			7th
Gael	N/A	"Penhasco"	902.953			Hitmaker
Leidy	N/A	"Alívio"	67.139			5th
Lucca	N/A	"Me Bloqueia"	372.630			2nd
Matheus	N/A	"Caleidoscópio"	106.758			4th
Mayarah	N/A	"Apaga A Luz"	41.369			9th
Nick	N/A	"Envolvidão"	54.871			7th
Nicole	N/A	"Bermuda e Chinelo"	52.455			8th
Ramalho	N/A	"Gratidão"	28.741			11th
Thália	N/A	"Brigas Demais"	29.726			10th
Unna	N/A	"Disk Me"	307.597			3rd
Artist	Order	Song	Public vote			Result
Artist	Order	Song	Single	Fan	Avg.	Result
Duel
Leidy	1	"Faz Um Milagre Em Mim"	43.09%	34.00%	38.55%	Battle
Lucca	2	"A Hora é Agora"	56.91%	66.00%	61.45%	Duel Winner
Festival
Leidy	1	"Alívio"	35.87%	33.49%	34.68%	Battle
Matheus	2	"Caleidoscópio"	40.94%	54.77%	47.86%	Battle
Ramalho	3	"Gratidão"	23.19%	11.74%	17.46%	Eliminated
Gael	4	"Penhasco"	Non-competitive			Star of the Week
Thália	5	"Brigas Demais"	Non-competitive			Stage Owner
Evellin	6	"A Gente Se Entrega"	Non-competitive			Hitmaker Guest

==== Week 5 ====
Releases
Artist	Order	Song	Streams			Rank
Evellin	N/A	"Manda um Oi"	43.490			7th
Gael	N/A	"Vidente"	853.285			Hitmaker
Leidy	N/A	"Ressuscita-me"	63.646			6th
Lucca	N/A	"Erro Gostoso"	315.082			3rd
Matheus	N/A	"Luz dos Olhos"	815.925			2nd
Mayarah	N/A	"A Boba Fui Eu"	37.163			9th
Nick	N/A	"Pouca Pausa"	38.827			8th
Nicole	N/A	"Man! I Feel Like a Woman!"	136.013			4th
Thália	N/A	"Não Vou Parar"	22.879			10th
Unna	N/A	"Dengo"	73.874			5th
Artist	Order	Song	Public vote			Result
Artist	Order	Song	Single	Fan	Avg.	Result
Duel
Lucca	1	"Barulho Do Foguete"	72.38%	78.51%	75.45%	Duel Winner
Nick	2	"O Sol"	27.62%	21.49%	24.55%	Battle
Festival
Leidy	1	"Ressuscita-me"	34.63%	28.66%	31.65%	Battle
Matheus	2	"Luz dos Olhos"	48.77%	61.97%	55.37%	Battle
Nick	3	"Pouca Pausa"	16.60%	9.37%	12.98%	Eliminated
Unna	4	"Dengo"	Non-competitive			Star of the Week
Gael	5	"Vidente"	Non-competitive			Stage Owner
Mayarah	6	"A Boba Fui Eu"	Non-competitive			Hitmaker Guest

==== Week 6 ====
Releases
Artist	Order	Song	Streams			Rank
Evellin	N/A	"Solteiro Forçado"	15.261			8th
Gael	N/A	"Idiota"	206.539			3rd
Leidy	N/A	"Os Anjos Te Louvam"	18.949			7th
Lucca	N/A	"Vou Ter que Superar"	258.009			Hitmaker
Matheus	N/A	"Vou Deixar"	233.342			2nd
Mayarah	N/A	"Quebrar Seu Coração"	35.307			6th
Nicole	N/A	"Mulher Segura"	37.794			5th
Thália	N/A	"Dona de Mim"	12.079			9th
Unna	N/A	"Cuidado Comigo"	54.958			4th
Artist	Order	Song	Public vote			Result
Artist	Order	Song	Single	Fan	Avg.	Result
Duel
Lucca	1	"Seu Astral"	45.96%	44.19%	45.08%	Battle
Matheus	2	"Metamorfose Ambulante"	54.04%	55.81%	54.92%	Duel Winner
Festival
Evellin	1	"Solteiro Forçado"	21.84%	18.26%	20.05%	Battle
Lucca	2	"Vou Ter que Superar"	58.54%	68.12%	63.33%	Battle
Mayarah	3	"Quebrar Seu Coração"	5.36%	2.44%	3.90%	Eliminated
Thália	4	"Dona de Mim"	14.26%	11.18%	12.72%	Eliminated
Gael	5	"Idiota"	Non-competitive			Star of the Week
Matheus	6	"Vou Deixar"	Non-competitive			Stage Owner

==== Week 7 ====
Releases
Artist	Order	Song	Streams			Rank
Evellin	N/A	"Daqui Pra Sempre (Tattoo)"	Unreleased			
Gael	N/A	"Por Supuesto"	Unreleased			
Leidy	N/A	"Tá Chorando Por Quê?"	Unreleased			
Lucca	N/A	"quando a bad bater"	Unreleased			
Matheus	N/A	"Primeiros Erros (Chove)"	Unreleased			
Nicole	N/A	"Passada de Mão"	Unreleased			
Unna	N/A	"A Dona Aranha"	Unreleased			
Artist	Order	Song	Public vote			Result
Artist	Order	Song	Single	Fan	Avg.	Result
Duel
Gael	1	"Back to Black"	15.85%	10.93%	13.39%	Eliminated
Leidy	2	"Vem Com Josué Lutar Em Jericó"	65.09%	58.92%	62.01%	Safe
Nicole	3	"Pássaro de Fogo"	19.06%	30.15%	24.60%	Safe
Encore Festival
Evellin	1	"Manda um Oi" (Week 5)	15.85%	10.93%	13.39%	Eliminated
Leidy	2	"Girassol" (Week 2)	31.81%	21.84%	26.82%	Battle
Matheus	3	"Como Uma Onda" (Week 3)	41.70%	66.09%	53.90%	Battle
Nicole	4	"Melhor Sozinha" (Week 2)	10.95%	5.05%	8.00%	Eliminated
Lucca	5	"Me Bloqueia" (Week 4)	Non-competitive			Star of the Week
Unna	6	"Disk Me" (Week 4)	Non-competitive			Stage Owner
Final Festival
Opening	N/A	"Anunciação" (Top 4 Finalists)	Non-competitive			
Leidy	1	"Tá Chorando Por Quê?"	13.17%	4.21%	8.69%	Fourth place
Leidy	5	"Os Anjos Te Louvam" (Week 6)	13.17%	4.21%	8.69%	Fourth place
Lucca	2	"quando a bad bater"	40.68%	41.40%	41.13%	Winner
Lucca	6	"Erro Gostoso" (Week 5)	40.68%	41.40%	41.13%	Winner
Matheus	3	"Primeiros Erros (Chove)"	24.71%	44.93%	34.82%	Runner-up
Matheus	7	"Partilhar" (Week 1)	24.71%	44.93%	34.82%	Runner-up
Unna	4	"A Dona Aranha"	21.26%	9.46%	15.36%	Third place
Unna	8	"Bem Que Se Quis" (Week 1)	21.26%	9.46%	15.36%	Third place
Closing	N/A	"Cuida Bem Dela" (Week 1) (Winner Lucca)	Non-competitive			

== Ratings and reception ==
=== Brazilian ratings ===
All numbers are in points and provided by Kantar Ibope Media.

Week	First air date	Last air date	Timeslot (BRT)	Daily SP viewers (in points)							SP viewers (in points)	BR viewers (in points)	Ref.
Week	First air date	Last air date	Timeslot (BRT)	Mon	Tue	Wed	Thu	Fri	Sat	Sun	SP viewers (in points)	BR viewers (in points)	Ref.
1	August 13, 2024	August 18, 2024	Monday to Saturday; 10:30 p.m. Wednesday; 11:45 p.m. Sunday; 11:00 p.m.	—	13.9	8.2	14.3	14.7	10.7	9.8	11.9	Outside top 10	
2	August 19, 2024	August 25, 2024	Monday to Saturday; 10:30 p.m. Wednesday; 11:45 p.m. Sunday; 11:00 p.m.	16.6	10.4	9.2	13.0	14.2	13.8	8.2	12.2	Outside top 10	
3	August 26, 2024	September 1, 2024	Monday to Saturday; 10:30 p.m. Wednesday; 11:45 p.m. Sunday; 11:00 p.m.	14.2	12.3	8.1	12.6	13.3	13.9	8.8	11.9	Outside top 10	
4	September 2, 2024	September 8, 2024	Monday to Saturday; 10:30 p.m. Wednesday; 11:45 p.m. Sunday; 11:00 p.m.	13.6	12.8	13.8	11.9	10.4	11.6	9.1	11.9	Outside top 10	
5	September 9, 2024	September 15, 2024	Monday to Saturday; 10:30 p.m. Wednesday; 11:45 p.m. Sunday; 11:00 p.m.	12.3	11.0	12.9	8.1	12.0	12.5	7.5	10.9	Outside top 10	
6	September 16, 2024	September 22, 2024	Monday to Saturday; 10:30 p.m. Wednesday; 11:45 p.m. Sunday; 11:00 p.m.	12.3	10.0	9.1	11.0	11.8	11.6	7.9	10.5	Outside top 10	
7	September 23, 2024	September 29, 2024	Monday to Saturday; 10:30 p.m. Wednesday; 11:45 p.m. Sunday; 11:00 p.m.	11.9	10.7	8.4	10.9	13.0	12.0	8.5	10.8	Outside top 10	
8	September 30, 2024	October 1, 2024	Monday to Saturday; 10:30 p.m. Wednesday; 11:45 p.m. Sunday; 11:00 p.m.	12.9	12.0	—	—	—	—	—	12.5	Outside top 10	

- In 2024, each point represents 253.273 households in 15 market cities in Brazil (73.279 households in São Paulo).
