= Franco da Rocha Caipira Guitar Orchestra =

Caipira orchestra

The Franco da Rocha Caipira Guitar Orchestra (Portuguese: Orquestra de Viola Caipira de Franco da Rocha) is an Caipira orchestra from the city of Franco da Rocha, in São Paulo, Brazil. It was founded by music teacher Fábio "Sabiá" Miranda in 2017 with the aim of promoting the performance of Caipira guitar players.

In 2022, it was nominated for the Inezita Barroso Award, given by the Legislative Assembly of São Paulo.

== See also ==
- Du Catira Family, Caipira association from the city of Itapevi, São Paulo
