= Mandi & Sorocabinha =

Sertanejo duo

Mandi & Sorocabinha was the first commercial Caipira music duo. It was formed by Manuel Rodrigues Lourenço, the Mandi (Anhembi, state of São Paulo, Brazil, January 25, 1905 – March 12, 1995) and Olegário José de Godoy, the Sorocabinha (Piracicaba, state of São Paulo, January 3, 1895 – São Paulo, July 10, 1995).

== Career ==
Manuel Rodrigues Lourenço formed in 1917 the Caboclo Quartet, in which they also played Luís Antônio de Oliveira Júnior, Astrogildo de Lima Peazza and Antônio Ferraz de Arruda. At the time, it was divided between the musical career and the profession of primary teacher. When he was still director of the Rural School Group of the city of Dois Córregos, he attended a presentation by the guitar player Olegário José and called him to join the Turma Caipira, a group that also brought together Cornélio Pires, Arlindo Santana, Caçula, Ferrinho, Mariano, Sebastião Ortiz and Zico Dias.

After several performances in São Paulo throughout the 1920s, the duo traveled to Rio de Janeiro in 1929 to record their first recordings. In the same year turma caipira made its last presentation, in Santos.

In the 1930s, Mandi and Sorocabinha recorded more than 60 albums for Columbia, RCA Victor, Odeon and Parlophon. They debuted in the cinema in 1934, singing Caboclo feliz, Caipira mulato and Imposto do selo in the film Let's walk with Cornélio Pires, documentary directed by Cornélio himself. They also performed at the Urca Casino, at the invitation of Alvarenga and Ranchinho.

From 1936, the duo's work fell, because Sorocabinha moved to São Paulo while Mandi was still in Piracicaba. After the final separation in 1940, Sorocabinha worked with other partners until he abandoned his musical career in 1951.

== Discography ==
The duo recorded many albums.

=== 1930s ===
==== 1930 ====
- Tempo ruim/A muié que cortô o cabelo, Parlophon.
- A crise/Caninha-verde, Parlophon.
- Duas leis americanaS/Depois do passeio, Parlophon.
- Reclamação de caboclo/Sonhei que tinha morrido, Parlophon.
- A carestia/Desafio, Parlophon.
- Depois das eleições/Imposto do selo, Parlophon.

==== 1931 ====
- Caipira apurado/No restaurante, Parlophon.
- Os dez mandamentos/O marreco morreu, Parlophon.

==== 1932 ====
- Jogo do bicho/O corvo e a raposa, Parlophon.

==== 1934 ====
- Tempo ruim/A muié que cortô o cabelo, Odeon.
- A crise/Caninha-verde, Odeon.
- Reclamação de caboclo/Sonhei que tinha morrido, Odeon.
- Caipira apurado/No restaurante, Odeon.
- Os dez mandamentos/Marreco morreu, Odeon.
- Modas modernas/Casamento é besteira, Odeon.
- Atualidades/Invasão de São Paulo, Odeon.
- Samba da roça/Desengano de caboclo, Odeon.

==== 1935 ====
- Nhô Felle caiu da égua/Que moça bonita, Odeon.
- Por um agradinho seu/O que vi na cidade, Odeon.
- ABC do pau d'água/Patacoadas, Odeon.
- Briga do casar/Caboclo violeiro, Odeon.
- Jogo do bicho/O corvo e a raposa, Odeon.
- Cururu cururu/A caçada dos sete veados, Odeon.
- O fim de dois valentes/Vida de rocero, Odeon.

==== 1936 ====
- Amansando o sogro/Rio de Janeiro, Odeon.
- Cururu/Oh São Paulo, Odeon.
- Moças do meu bairro/A morte de Mariquinha, Odeon.
- A pinga não presta/Prá morde cinco mil-réis, Odeon.

==== 1937 ====
- Namoro de menino/O rico e o pobre, Odeon.
- Samba saudoso/Tudo selado, Odeon.
- A vida do sertão/Caninha verde, Odeon.

==== 1938 ====
- Vida forgada/Pra cantá gostoso, Odeon.
- Mandi e Sorocabinha/Passeio de caipira, Odeon.
- Batizado do sapinho I/Batizado do sapinho II, Odeon.

==== 1939 ====
- A vida/O namoro caipira, Odeon.
- Chuvarada/Tempo de moço, Odeon.
- Se eu fosse rico/Discussão, Odeon.
- Antigamente/Desafio, Odeon.
- A Guerra da Espanha/Sodade do tempo véio, Columbia.
- Amanhecer na roça/Namoro de velhos, Columbia.
- Joaquim Carreiro/Crespo e Liso, Columbia.
- Vidinha de roceiro/Desafio, Columbia.
- Julho de 1932/Viagem pro Rio de Janeiro, Columbia.

=== 1940s ===
==== 1940 ====
- O namoro da Rosinha/Os amores de Nhá Tuca, Odeon.

=== Dateless ===
- Casamento é besteira/Modas modernas, Parlophon.
- Atualidades/Invasão de São Paulo, Parlophon.
- Sodade do tempo véio/A Guerra da Espanha, Columbia.
- A muié e o rádio/Jogo do bicho, Columbia.
- Amanhecer na roça/Namoro dos velhos, Columbia.
- O canarinho/O cuitelo e o beija-flor, Columbia.
- Crespo e liso/Joaquim Carreiro, Columbia.
- Caipira embriagado/Embrulhão das moças, Columbia.
- O canarinho/O cuitelo e o beija-flor, Columbia.
- Caipira embriagado/Embrulhão das moças, Columbia.
- Impressão da capitá/A papuda, Columbia.
- A muié e o rádio/Jogo do bicho, Columbia.
