= Samambaia Sul station =

Federal District Metro station

Samambaia Sul
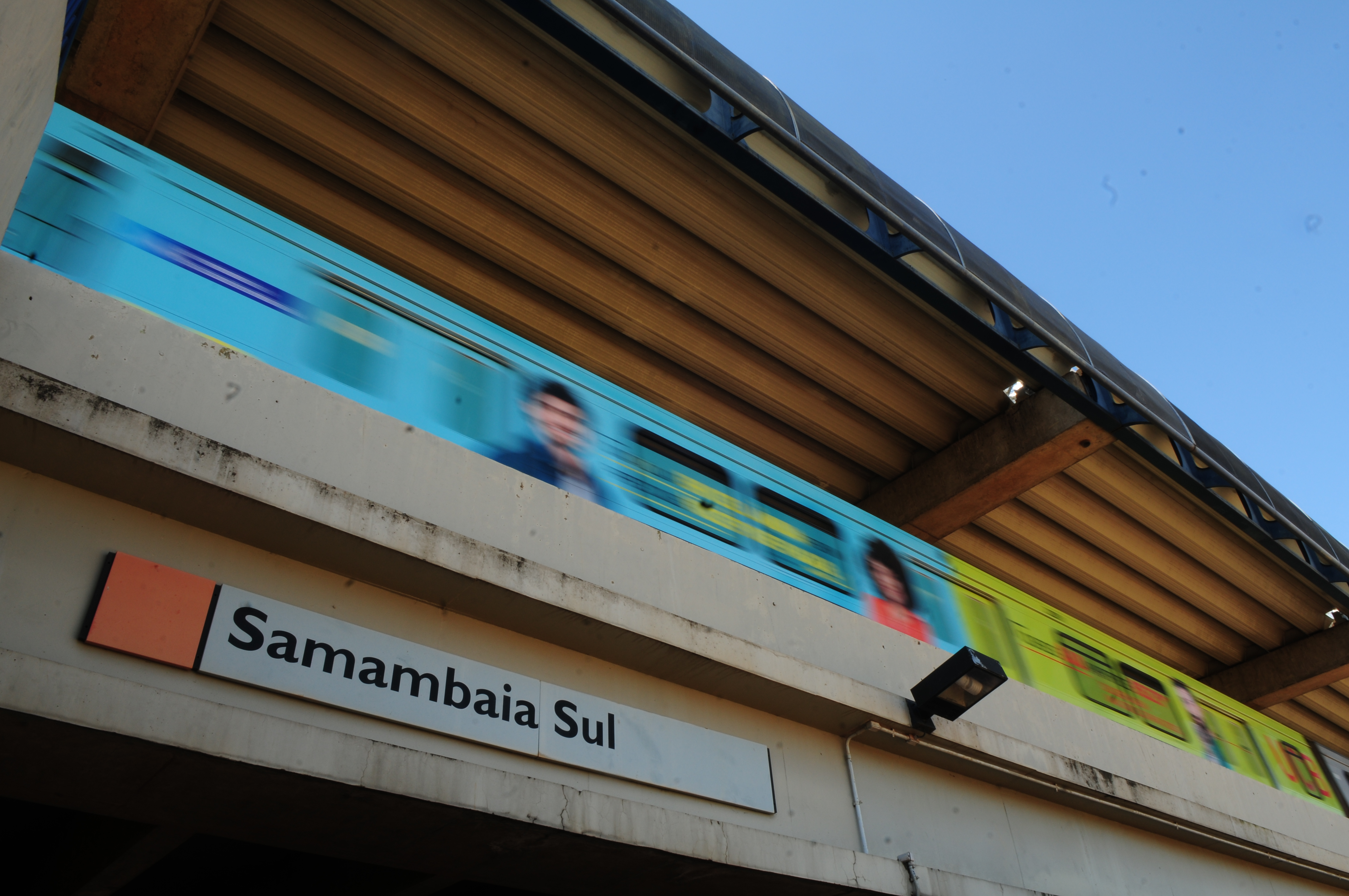
- View of the station entrance

General information
- Location: Qr 112 Conjunto 5 - Samambaia; Federal District; Brazil
- Coordinates: 15°52′08.5″S 48°04′17.8″W
- System: Federal District Metro station
- Owner: Government of the Federal District (Brazil)
- Operator: Companhia do Metropolitano do Distrito Federal (Metrô DF)
- Line: Orange line
- Platforms: 1
- Tracks: 2

Construction
- Structure type: At-grade
- Accessible: Yes

Other information
- Station code: SAS

History
- Opened: 6 February 2002; 24 years ago
Location

Samambaia Sul (Station code: SAS) is a Federal District Metro brazilian station on Orange line. It opened on 6 February 2002 on the already operating section of the line from Central to Terminal Samambaia. It is located between Furnas and Terminal Samambaia.
