= Estrela da Casa =

- Genre: Reality competition
- Presented by: Ana Clara
- Starring: Anitta; Belo; Junior Lima; Michel Teló
- Country of origin: Brazil
- Original language: Portuguese
- No. of seasons: 3
- No. of episodes: 124

Production
- Camera setup: Multi-camera
- Running time: 30–75 minutes

Original release
- Network: TV Globo; Multishow; Globoplay
- Release: August 13, 2024 – present

Related
- Star Academy

Estrela da Casa (English: Star of the House) is a Brazilian singing competition format, originally created, produced, and broadcast by TV Globo. The series premiered on August 13, 2024, and is hosted by Ana Clara.

The first season of was considered a ratings failure in 2024, ultimately leading to the departure of its lead showrunner, Boninho, from the network. TV Globo denied cancellation rumors and confirmed a second season featuring a revamped format and Michel Teló as a mentor for the contestants.

For the third season, the series was renamed Estrelas da Casa and shifted its focus toward the formation of a musical group. Anitta joined the cast as an advisor, while Belo and Junior Lima became the new mentors.

== Format ==
Contestants live together in a house at Estúdios Globo (billed as the Music Training Center starting in the second season), where they train, perform, and compete in weekly challenges to showcase their singing, stage presence, and charisma across a variety of musical genres. Each contestant releases a personal single, with chart performance granting advantages in the competition, while viewers vote in real time to influence the results. The winner receives career management, support for a national tour, and a cash prize starting at R$500.000.

== Series overview ==
Season	Winner	Runner-up	Host	Mentor(s)	Advisor
1	Lucca	Matheus Torres	Ana Clara	—	
2	Thainá Gonçalves	Hanii	Ana Clara	Michel Teló	—
3	Simples Desejo	Lúmina	Ana Clara	Belo; Junior Lima	Anitta

== Ratings and reception ==
=== Brazilian ratings ===
All numbers are in points and provided by Kantar Ibope Media.

Season	Timeslot (BRT)	Premiered		Ended		TV season	SP viewers (in points)	Source
Season	Timeslot (BRT)	Date	Viewers (in points)	Date	Viewers (in points)	TV season	SP viewers (in points)	Source
1	Monday to Saturday; 10:30 p.m. Wednesday; 11:45 p.m. Sunday; 11:30 p.m.	August 13, 2024	13.6	October 1, 2024	12.0	2024	11.58	
2	Monday to Saturday; 10:30 p.m. Wednesday; 11:45 p.m. Sunday; 11:30 p.m.	August 25, 2025	16.6	October 6, 2025	15.3	2025	13.40	
3	Monday to Saturday; 10:30 p.m. Wednesday; 11:45 p.m. Sunday; 11:30 p.m.	August 25, 2026	11.6	September 24, 2026		2026		

- Each point represents a specific number of households in São Paulo.
  - 2024: 73.279 households.
  - 2025: 77.488 households.
  - 2026: 78.780 households.

== Spin-offs ==
=== Palco Estrela da Casa ===
Palco Estrela da Casa (English: Estrela da Casa Stage), formerly Bate-Papo Estrela da Casa in season 1, is an online segment airing on Gshow and Globoplay immediately after the live Festival, featuring eliminated contestants being interviewed about their experience on the show. It was hosted by Ceci Ribeiro and actor Silvero Pereira in season 1, and by singer Lucas Lima since season 2.

=== Estrela da Casa – Backstage ===
Estrela da Casa – Backstage is a spin-off series that premiered on August 14, 2024, airing exclusively on Multishow. In the first season, it was hosted by Kenya Sade, and since the second season by Dedé Teicher and singer Lucas Silveira. The show features the most recently eliminated contestants, who engage in a discussion with special celebrity guests and perform live music in a jam session format.
