= Samambaia, Federal District =

Samambaia
- Administrative region
- Região Administrativa de Samambaia; Administrative Region of Samambaia
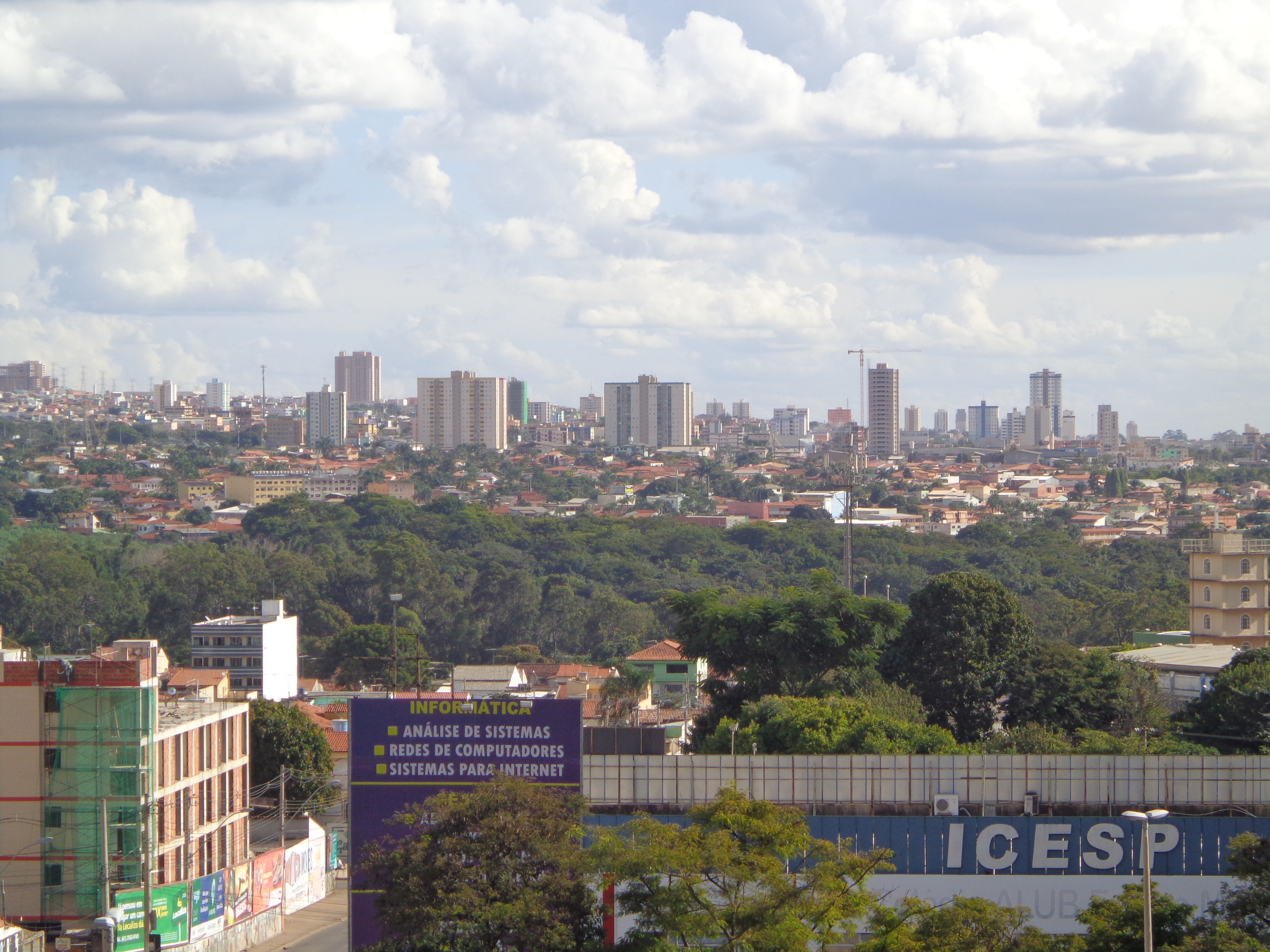
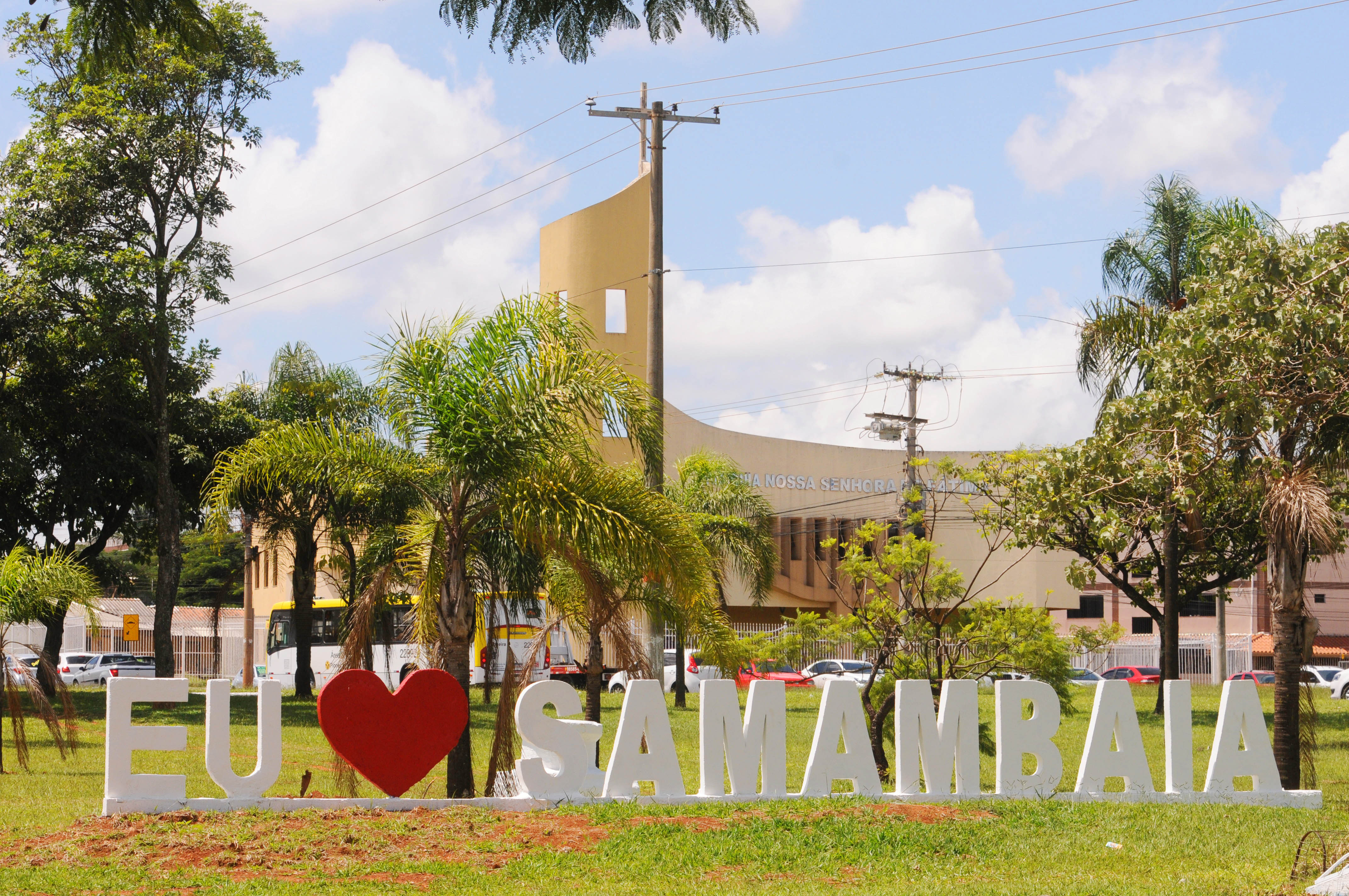
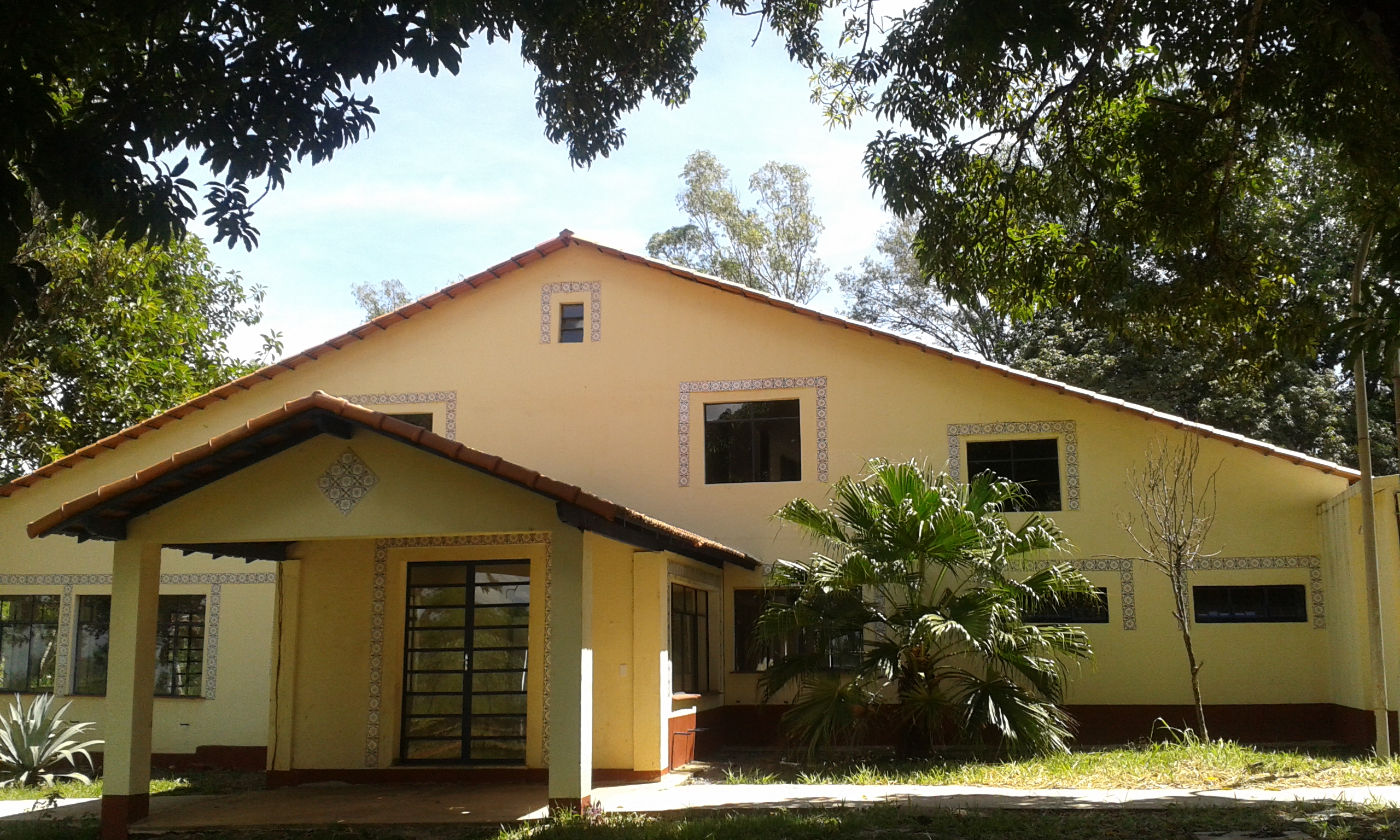
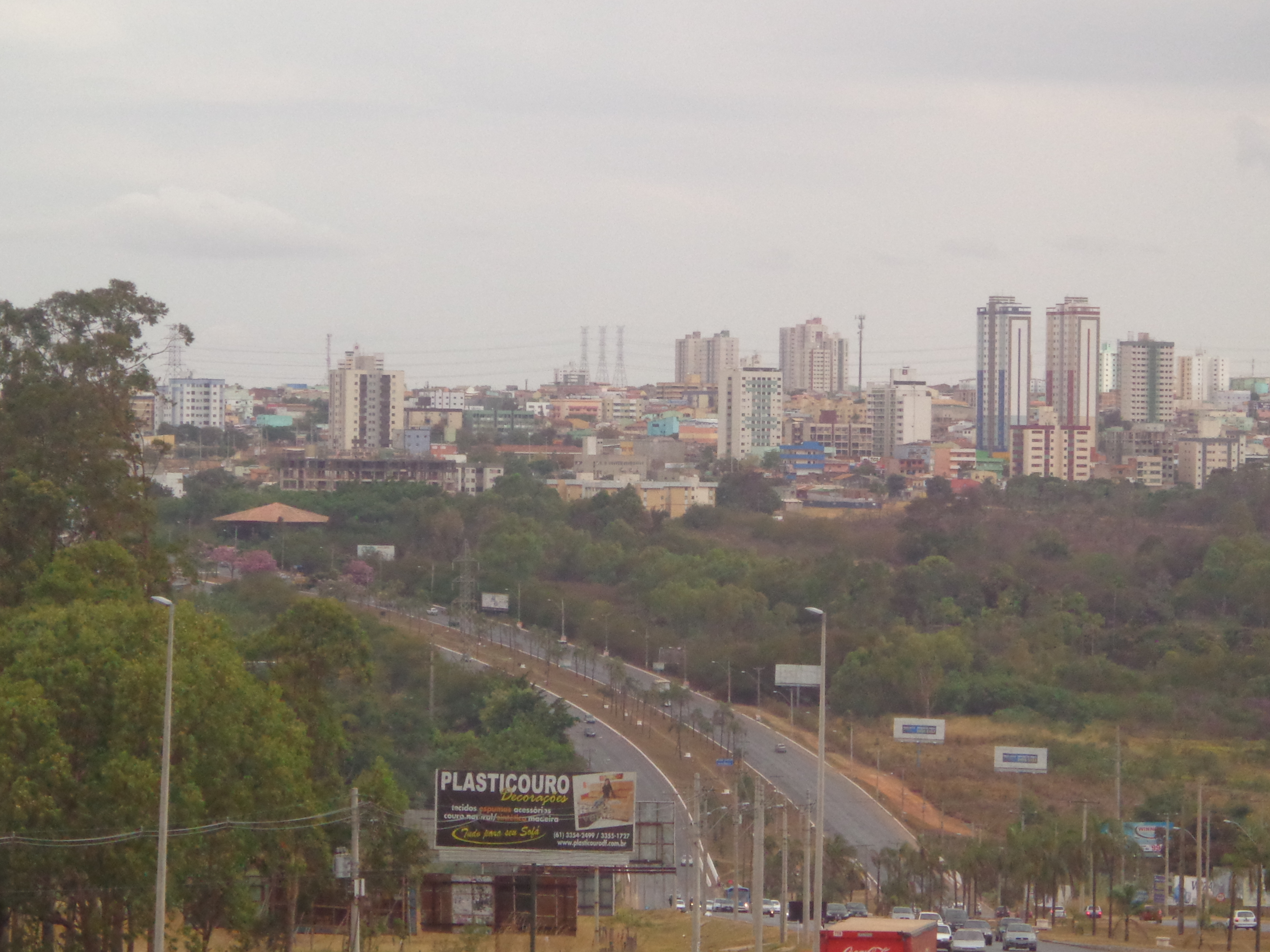
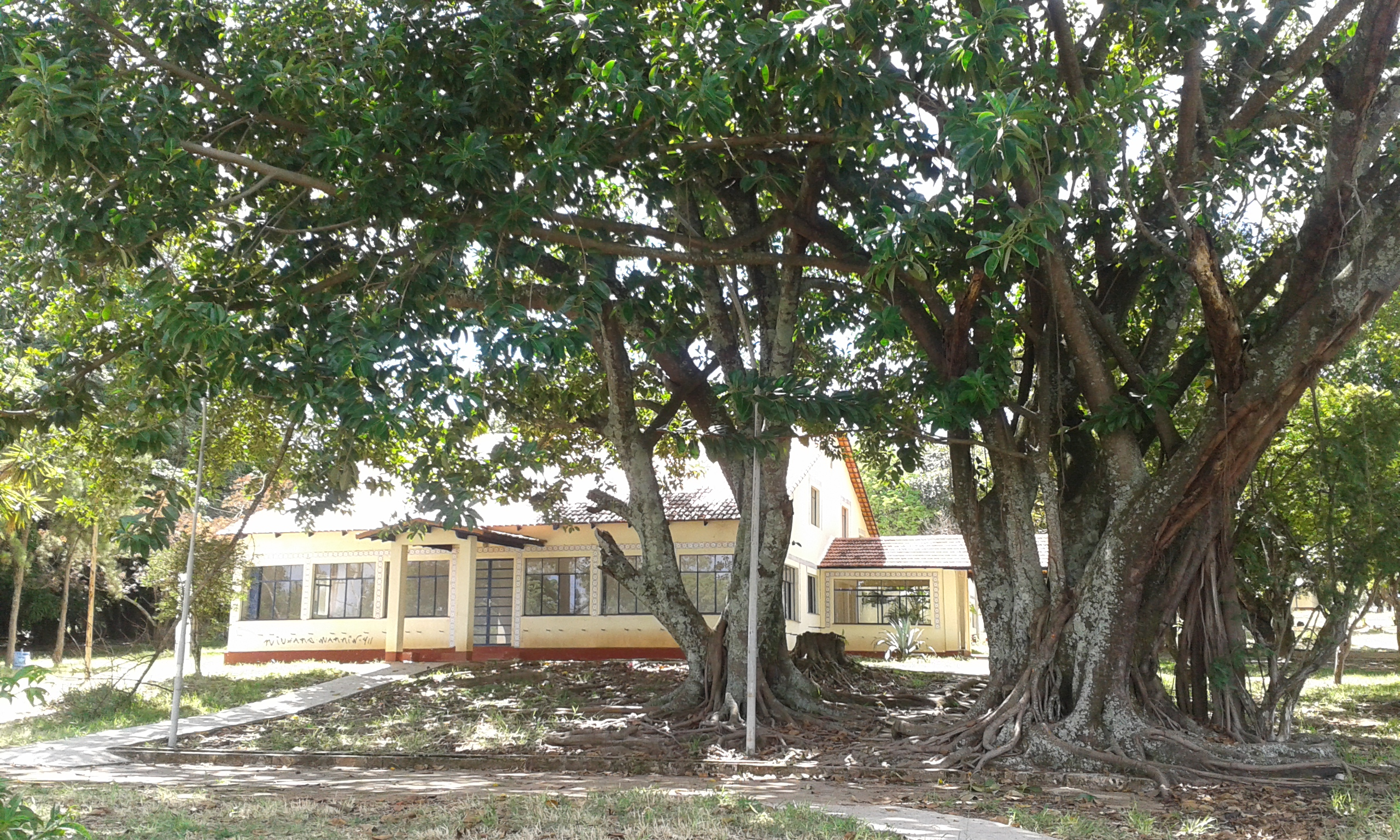

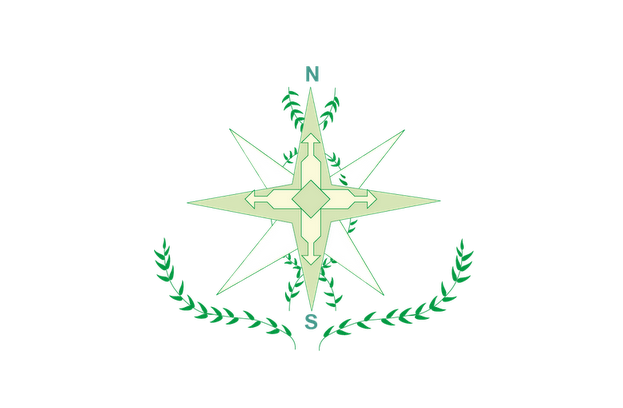
- Flag

- Location of Samambaia in the Federal District
- Coordinates: 15°52′34″S 48°05′19″W
- Country: Brazil
- Region: Central-West
- State: Federal District
- Established: 25 October 1989

Government
  - Regional administrator: Marcos Leite de Araújo

Area
  - Total: 102.6 km^{2} (39.6 sq mi)

Population
  - Total: 193,485
  - Density: 1,886/km^{2} (4,884/sq mi)
- Time zone: UTC-3 (UTC-3)
  - Summer (DST): UTC-2 (UTC-2)
- Area code: +55 61
- Website: www.samambaia.df.gov.br

Samambaia (Brazilian Portuguese pronunciation: [sɐmɐ̃ˈbajɐ]) is an administrative region in the Federal District in Brazil. It is bordered by Ceilândia and Sol Nascente/Pôr do Sol to the north, Taguatinga to the east, and Riacho Fundo II and Recanto das Emas to the south. With a population of 232,893, it is the second largest administrative region by population, behind Ceilândia. Samambaia was founded on October 25, 1989, receiving the status of administrative region, according to Law 49, of October 25, 1989. Its current administrator is Marcos Leite de Araújo.

== Education ==
Samambaia is home to the Federal Institute of Brasília's Samambaia Campus.

== Sports ==
=== Clubs ===
- Rugby
  - Clube e Escola de Rugby Samambaia
- Campeonato Brasiliense
  - Samambaia Futebol Clube

== Transportation ==
=== Metro ===
Samambia is served by the following Federal District Metro Green line stations:

- Furnas station
- Samambaia Sul station
- Terminal Samambaia station

== See also ==
- List of administrative regions of the Federal District
