= Caipira pagode =

Caipira pagode (in Portuguese: pagode caipira; also known as pagode de viola and pagode sertanejo), is a variant of Caipira music originating in the state of Paraná.

== See also ==
- Caipira viola
