= Du Catira Family =

Brazilian caipira association

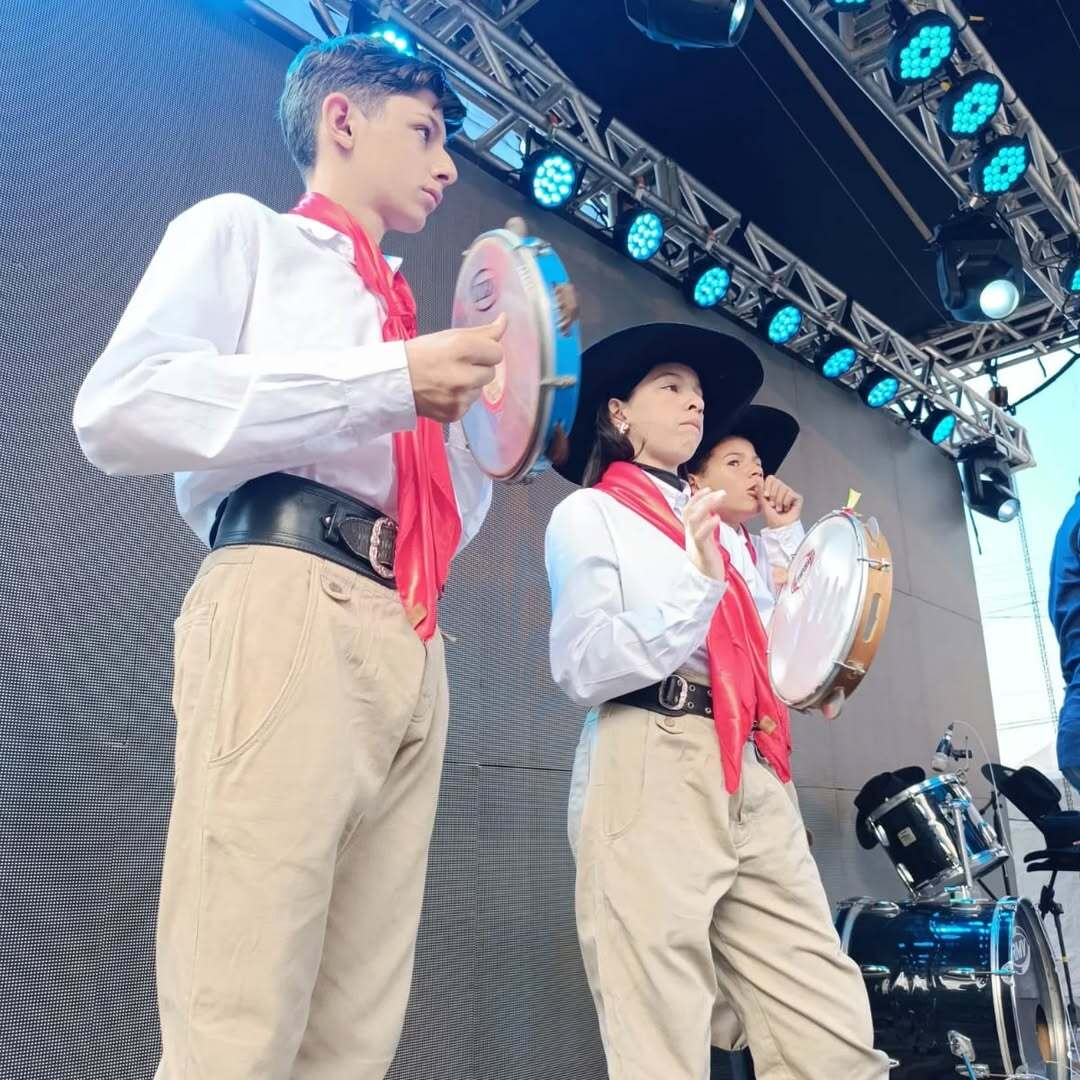
Du Catira Family in Santa Barbara d'Oeste

The Du Catira Family (in portuguese: Família Du Catira) is a traditional caipira association from the city of Itapevi, in São Paulo. The group was founded by tropeiro Carlos Eduardo da Silva in 2018 with the aim of preserving and encouraging folkloric traditions from the brazilian state of São Paulo through catira dance performances. The family has been active since 1958, also promoting Folia de Reis meetings.

In 2020, the group was recognized by the International Organization of Folklore and Popular Arts (IOV), promoted by UNESCO, as intangible cultural heritage, for conserving and promoting popular art and folk culture. In 2025, it was nominated for the Inezita Barroso Award, held by the Legislative Assembly of São Paulo.
