= Ana Clara =

Brazilian reporter and presenter (born 1997)

Ana Clara Lima
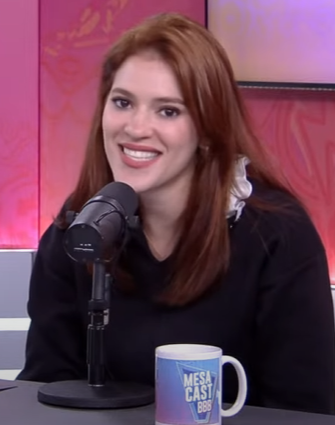
- Lima in 2024.
- Born: Ana Clara Mello Lima; April 11, 1997 (age 29); Rio de Janeiro, Brazil
- Occupations: journalist, reporter, presenter, actress
- Years active: 2014–present
- Television: Big Brother Brasil; Vídeo Show
- Parents: Ayrton Lima (father); Eva Mello (mother)

Ana Clara Mello Lima (born April 11, 1997), better known as Ana Clara, is a Brazilian presenter, journalist, reporter, actress and YouTuber. She gained national notoriety when she participated in the eighteenth edition of the reality show Big Brother Brasil.

== Biography ==
Ana Clara Lima was born on April 11, 1997, in Rio de Janeiro, the only daughter of commercial director Eva Mello and systems analyst Ayrton Lima. She was a child described as agitated, messy, talkative, who did not do well at school and repeated seventh grade. Despite this, since she was little she has had a strong reading habit, has ease in argumentation and communication, and enjoys speaking in public.

She always wanted to work with art and audiovisual on television. She started taking theater classes at the age of 11 at Cia Arte Grimberg and during her childhood and adolescence she also took courses in musical theater, cinema, marketing, TV, makeup, acted in plays and graduated in English.

In 2016, she entered the Journalism course at ESPM Rio, where she was a reporter for the college's Journalism Portal, was part of CBN's Universidade no Ar project and participated in competitions as a cheerleader. At the same time, she went on exchange to Florida to study English again. In 2017, she was a press office intern at the Secretaria of Culture and Creative Economy of Rio de Janeiro. During her graduation, Ana wanted to delve deeper into Hard News, but after her fame she moved into entertainment, and in an interview with Vogue Brasil, she declared that she always wanted to be a communicator and would like to be seen as a complete professional "i can act, present, do anything."

In 2019, she received the title of Illustrious Supporter of Fluminense Futebol Clube.

== Career ==
=== 2014–2018: Beginning of Internet fame and Big Brother Brasil ===
Ana Clara began her career in 2014, when she began posting unpretentious videos on the video platform Vine and became popular among children and young people, accumulating more than 300 thousand subscribers and 22 million views. The following year, she opened the channel Quem Nunca? with other internet personalities and in 2017, she started her own channel to talk about travel, Bagagem da Ana, but was unable to continue due to her routine at college and internship.

She became nationally known in 2018, after participating in the eighteenth season of Big Brother Brasil, coming in third place with 3.39% of the votes, behind Kaysar Dadour (39.33%) and Gleici Damasceno (57.28%). She entered the reality show with her father Ayrton Lima, who had tried to join the BBB for 15 years, her mother Eva and her cousin Jorge, and after six days of coexistence, father and daughter were chosen by the public, with 23.84% and 44.26% of the votes, respectively, to stay on the program and compete as if they were a single participant, something unprecedented in the program, as this dynamic had only happened previously on the reality show A Fazenda 7 with participants Pepê & Neném. Alongside Kaysar, Ana broke the record for the longest endurance test in the program's history, the contest lasted 42 hours and 58 minutes until it was interrupted by production for health and safety reasons. She was also the fastest female participant to reach 1 million followers on Instagram, reaching the number in 49 days of confinement, a record broken in the following edition by model and student Hariany.

=== 2018–2020: Artistic beginning at Globo, return to BBB and festivals ===
I want to embrace everything that appears to me. Shall we present? Come on. Are we going to be an actress? Come on. Shall we do a soap opera? Come on. Call me and I'll come. I will go after all of this, of all the opportunities that come my way, for sure.

— Ana Clara Lima, Gshow website on 04/26/2018

Aiming to pursue an artistic career, after leaving the program she registered with the TV Globo artistic group to act in the House's productions. In June, she was called to cover the Big Brother Brasil 19 tryouts in Goiânia and Rio Branco for the reality show's digital platforms, and was invited to make some appearances on the Video Show reporting and talking about the tryouts. At that time, rumors arose that Ana Clara was being considered to join the team of presenters of the program in a possible reformulation after the World Cup, and that she had auditioned for the soap opera Verão 90. In July, she was confirmed in the fixed cast of the afternoon show as co-host and reporter, alongside Sophia Abrahão, Felipe Titto, Marcela Monteiro and two former BBB participants, Fernanda Keulla and Vivian Amorim, and in parallel, participated in specific coverage of programs such as The Voice Brasil and Criança Esperança for the Globo website and social networks. Still in 2018, she launched a makeup line in partnership with the Brazilian brand Miss Pink, represented the book club of the publisher Intrinseca, which during the period was called Ana Clara + Intrínsecos and entered the list of the most watched Instagram Stories in Brazil, occupying 8th position. She was also elected one of the 25 sexiest women of 2018 by IstoÉ and one of the personalities of the year by the website IG.

In 2019, she was reassigned to the Big Brother Brasil team, once again accompanied by Fernanda and Vivian. In her new role, she interviewed the public on the street, eliminated participants, family members and presented the program's news bulletin. In the same year, she was a reporter for Multishow in the broadcasts of Rock in Rio - being considered by UOL, the festival's revelation reporter -, Multishow Award, and hired by Chevrolet, she provided digital coverage of Lollapalooza Brasil with Thaynara OG, Flávia Pavanelli, Maria Eugênia and other influencers. In October, she was announced as one of the personalities of the YouTube project Figuras Públicas. In November, she recorded the horror short film Storytelling at the invitation of director Fábio Brandão. Also in 2019, her career began to be managed by a team specialized in actors and presenters.

In 2020, she hosted the program Big Data - Retrospectiva BBB, a 10-episode series that shows the best moments of the editions of Big Brother Brasil, on the Globoplay streaming platform and returned to the Big Brother reporting team, with Keulla and Nyvi Estephan, this time being in charge of not only the interviews, street reports and bulletins, but also of presenting the program's podcast and carrying out promotional actions for PicPay, the reality show's sponsor. In April, she participated in Ivete Sangalo's live on Multishow as a commentator, and interviewed Ivete and a fan of the singer. In May, she hosted the live presentation of player Fred at Fluminense and in July, she returned to work with the club, this time presenting FluFest. In August, she was invited by GNT to present the special Dia dos Solteiros - Central de Chamada. In December, Boninho confirmed on social media that Ana would return to Rede BBB in 2021.

=== 2021–2023: Back online and new programs ===
In January 2021, she was officially confirmed as part of the BBB21 team of reporters, with Vivian Amorim and Rhudson Victor. For her work, she received praise from Boninho on Twitter and a 10 from Patrícia Kogut. In March, she returned with her YouTube channel. In the same month, she gained her first opportunity to lead a solo program, being announced as presenter of the afternoon daily Plantão BBB. In the attraction, she covered the main moments of the twenty-first edition of the reality show and interviewed famous spectators. Plantão BBB received mixed reviews and took second place overall during its airing, but Ana was praised for her performance.

On May 10, 2021, she took over Bate-Papo No Limite, shown on Tuesdays after the live TV program on Gshow and Globoplay, where she interviews the eliminated participants in the reality show. At the end of the same month, Globo announced that Ana Clara would combine No Limite with The Voice Kids, as she would lead a musical reality web attraction for Globoplay. In November, she debuted on Canal Viva presenting the program É Tudo Novela!, a fictional reality show with notable characters from television drama, created to celebrate 70 years of soap operas in Brazil.

In January 2022, she continues on the team of presenters of Big Brother Brasil, now commanding the attractions A Eliminação and Fora da Casa. During BBB, the No Limite team has announced its return, this time leading the edition of the program shown on Sunday at night, after Fantástico. Ana also returns to Rock in Rio broadcasts on Multishow in the same year.

The reporter recorded a brief appearance in the soap opera Cara e Coragem, playing herself in a sequence that simulated the recording of a commercial, but the scenes were removed by Rede Globo after controversy involving yellowface

=== 2024–present: Estrela da Casa ===
On February 5, 2024, during BBB24, Ana Clara was announced live as presenter of Estrela da Casa, Globo's new music and confinement reality show, scheduled to debut in the second half of the year.

== Filmography ==
=== Television ===
Year	Title	Role	Notes
2018	Big Brother Brasil	Participant (3rd place)	
2018	Vídeo Show	Presenter/Reporter	
2019–21	Bate-Papo BBB	Presenter/Reporter	
2019–present	Rock in Rio	Presenter/Reporter	
2020	Big Data - Retrospectiva BBB	Presenter	
2021	Plantão BBB	Presenter	
2021	The Voice Kids no Parquinho	Presenter	
2021	É Tudo Novela!	Presenter	
2021-22	No Limite: A Eliminação	Presenter	
2022–present	Big Brother Brasil: A Eliminação	Presenter	
2022	Fora da Casa	Presenter	
2023–present	Lollapalooza	Presenter	
2023–present	Túnel do Amor	Presenter	
2023–present	Panelaço Ao Vivo	Presenter	
2024	Mesacast BBB	Presenter	
2024–present	Estrela da Casa	Presenter	
2025	Big Show	Presenter	

=== Internet ===
Year	Title	Role	Notes
2014–15	Ana Clara Vine	Herself	
2015–16	Canal Quem nunca?	Various characters	
2016–17	Portal Jornalismo ESPM	Reporter	ESPM Journalism Center Project
2017/2021–present	Canal Ana Clara	Herself	
2018	Seletivas Big Brother Brasil 19	Reporter	
2018	Criança Esperança	Warm-up presenter	
2018	The Voice Brasil	Behind the Scenes Coverage	
2019–20	SóTocaTop	Presenter Top	
2020	Podcast BBB	Presenter	
2020	Ivete Sangalo em Casa - O React	Commentator/Interviewer	
2020	Live do Tetra	Presenter	Presentation of the player Fred at Fluminense
2020	Live Sorriso Maroto	Presenter	
2020	Lives Storytelling	Interviewer	Interviews with the cast of the short film Storytelling
2020	FluFest	Presenter	
2020	Live Dia dos Solteiros - Central de Chamada	Presenter	GNT channel special
2021	Prêmio Rádio Globo	Presenter	
2022	Ana & Vegana	Presenter	Special Rock in Rio Lives
2022	Prêmio eSports Brasil	Presenter	

Film

Year	Title	Role	Notes
2014	Confissões de Adolescente		Cameo
2021	Story Telling	Mari	Short-film

== Stage ==
Year	Title	Role
2016	Nada com Coisa Nenhuma	Various characters (Comedy sketches)

== Radio ==
Year	Title	Notes
2017	Universidade no Ar	CBN Radio project for Communication students

== Advertising and events ==
In 2018, Ana starred in the commercial for Valda Friends, a product from the Valda brand, which was shown on TV. In the same year, she ran the campaign for the Outback restaurant with her Video Show colleague, Sophia Abrahão, which was broadcast online, and for Mastercard, shown on the internet and television, with Gleici Damasceno, Matheus Mazzafera, Luisa Sonza, Rayza Nicácio and Bruno da duo Bruninho and Davi. On Big Brother Brasil, since 2019, it has presented advertising actions from program sponsors on the program's social networks and TV.

As a digital influencer, she served as an ambassador for Nívea in 2019 and from 2020 to 2021, she was an ambassador for Carefree. In September 2020, she was a spokesperson for Disney Plus at the platform's arrival in Brazil, and for the launch of the professional dye brand Alfaparf Milano, participating in press releases with Marie Claire and Revista Quem.

Ana Clara also works as a presenter and reporter for brands in marketing actions:

- BBB: Since 2019, she has been carrying out advertising campaigns with Big Brother Brasil sponsors on the reality program and social media. Alongside the singer Iza, she is the face of PicPay during the program, presenting the activations shown on TV, and on social media she has already carried out actions for Avon, McDonald's and Fiat;
- Magazine Luiza: In January 2019, Ana was the presenter of Magazine Luiza's Fantastic Sale. There were 6 hours of uninterrupted live broadcast on YouTube in which Ana Clara and other influencers promoted the event and publicized offers;
- Lollapalooza Brasil: In April 2019, Ana Clara was a presenter and reporter for Lollapalloza Brasil in action by Chevrolet, the event's official sponsor. With other influencers, she covered the 3 official days of the event plus OnixDay, showing the festival's attractions and interviewing the public;
- McDonald's: in June 2019, she was master of ceremonies at the launch event for the new line of McDonald's burgers, with Lucas Rangel;
- Bienal do Rio: in September 2019, it covered one of the Biennale days for social media, showing participating spaces, attractions and personalities;
- Rock in Rio: during the broadcast of Rock in Rio 2019 at Multishow, Ana participated in actions sponsored by Trident and Bebecê Calçados as a reporter, interviewing the festival's audience;
- Prêmio Multishow: At the 2019 Multishow Awards, Ana Clara interviewed Gaby Amarantos as part of Natura's action at the event, and the band Lagum, winner of the Fiat Argo Experiment award;
- Ivete Sangalo em Casa: in April 2020, as part of the promotion of Ivete Sangalo's live, Ana Clara interviewed the singer at the invitation of Wella, sponsor of the event, and Multishow. The interview was made available on social media;
- Americanas: In October 2020, she hosted an episode of Americanas ao vivo, a live project by Lojas Americanas that aims to present offers and launches to the public. Ana's episode focused on people who live alone. In 2021, she became the presenter of the Tuuudo! on YouTube das Americanas with influencer Ademara;
- Época Cosméticos: Ana was the presenter of Época's Black Friday live shows during the month of November 2020;
- Arezzo: in 2021, she was the presenter of "Tudo Que a Brizza Toca" at the Arezzo online festival, to promote the new pieces from the Brizza collection;
- Globo: presented the online event "A Força dos Realities", designed to present the commercial power of TV Globo's reality shows to the advertising market. In the same year, he presented the Globoplay event at Comic-Con in Portugal.

== Lines and products ==
Risotto de Gorgonzola com Pera Caramelizada à Ana Clara: in July 2018, the Paris 6 restaurant launched Ana Clara's dish based on a family recipe from the reporter.

Ana Clara by Miss Pink: in August 2018, Ana Clara launched her makeup line in partnership with the Brazilian brand Miss Pink, this being the first time that the brand launched products in partnership with a personality. The line consisted of a 2-in-1 eyeliner and two red shades of lipstick, and was sold until the end of the year.

Ana Clara + Intrínsecos: Between October 2018 and February 2019, Ana Clara had her reading club, "Ana Clara + Intrínsecos". She was an ambassador for the Intrínseca publishing house's Reading Club, which gained its new name during the period, working on publicity and reviewing books monthly on social media.

== Awards and nominations ==
Year	Award	Category	Work nominated	Result
2018	Prêmio Gshow	Fandom of The Year	Pimentas da Ana Clara	Won
2018	Prêmio Gshow	Migos of The Year	Gleici Damasceno & Ana Clara Lima	Won
2019	Troféu Internet	Newcomer of The Year	Vídeo Show	Nominated
2019	Prêmio Jovem Brasileiro	Best Presenter	Vídeo Show	Nominated
2019	Uol/Troféu Rock in Rio	Revelation Reporter	Rock in Rio	Won
2021	Prêmio Jovem Brasileiro	Best Presenter	Plantão BBB	Won
2021	South America Awards	Best Supporting Actress	Story.Telling	Nominated
2021	Garoa Awards	Best Supporting Actress	Story.Telling	Nominated
2021	Prêmio Geração Glamour	Communicator of the Year	Plantão BBB, Rede BBB, No Limite, The Voice Kids no Parquinho	Won
2021	Prêmio F5	Best Entertainment Presenter	Bate Papo BBB	Won
2021	Prêmio Notícias da TV	TV revelation	Bate Papo BBB	Nominated
2023	Prêmio iBest	Twitter Influencer	Ana Clara Lima	Nominated
2023	SEC Awards	Featured on TV	Multishow	Won
2023	Prêmio Jovem Brasileiro	Best Presenter	Túnel do Amor	Pending
2024	Prêmio iBest	Reality Star	Big Brother Brasil	Pending
2024	Prêmio iBest	Rio de Janeiro Influencer	Ana Clara Lima	Pending
2024	Prêmio iBest	Twitter Influencer	Ana Clara Lima	Pending
2024	Prêmio iBest	Instagrammer of The Year	Ana Clara Lima	Pending
2024	BreakTudo Awards	Favorite Presenter	Túnel do Amor	Pending
2024	Splash Awards	Best Reality Show Presenter	Estrela da Casa	Pending
2024	Melhores do Ano Natelinha	Best Presenter	Estrela da Casa	Pending
