= List of new religious movements =

A new religious movement (NRM) is a religious or spiritual group or community with practices of relatively modern origins. NRMs may be novel in origin or they may exist on the fringes of a wider religion, in which case they will be distinct from pre-existing denominations. Academics identify a variety of characteristics which they employ in categorizing groups as new religious movements. The term is broad and inclusive, rather than sharply defined. New religious movements are generally seen as syncretic, employing human and material assets to disseminate their ideas and worldviews, deviating in some degree from a society's traditional forms or doctrines, focused especially upon the self, and having a peripheral relationship that exists in a state of tension with established societal conventions.

A NRM may be one of a wide range of movements ranging from those with loose affiliations based on novel approaches to spirituality or religion to communitarian enterprises that demand a considerable amount of group conformity and a social identity that separates their adherents from mainstream society. Use of the term NRM is not universally accepted among the groups to which it is applied. Scholars have estimated that NRMs number in the tens of thousands worldwide. Most have only a few members, some have thousands, and very few have more than a million. Academics occasionally propose amendments to technical definitions and continue to add new groups.

== List ==
List of new religious movements
Name	Founder	Founded	Type	References
3HO	Harbhajan Singh Khalsa	1969	Sikh	^{[Beit-Hallahmi 1997]}
Adidam, previously the Free Daist Communion, Dawn Horse Fellowship, etc.	Adi Da	1972	Neo-Hindu-inspired	^{[Clarke 2006]} ^{[Jones & Ryan 2007]} ^{[Beit-Hallahmi 1997]} ^{[Lewis 1998]}
Adonai-Shomo	Frederick T. Howland	1861	Adventist; Communalist	^{[Melton 2003]} ^{[Lewis 1998]}
Adonism	Franz Sättler	1925	Modern Pagan	
Adventures in Enlightenment, A Foundation	Terry Cole-Whittaker	1985	Religious Science	^{[Lewis 1998]}
Aetherius Society	George King	1954	UFO-Christian	^{[Beit-Hallahmi 1997]} ^{[Lewis 1998]}
The African Church	Jacob Kehinde Coker	1901	Anglican	^{[Chryssides 2001]}
African initiated churches	Multiple	1800s	Syncretic Christian-Indigenous	^{[Chryssides 2001]}
African Theological Archministry, previously the Order of Damballah Hwedo Ancestor Priests, Shango Temple, and Yoruba Temple	Walter Eugene King	1973	Afro-American; West African Vodun	^{[Melton 2003]} ^{[Lewis 1998]}
Agasha Temple of Wisdom	Richard Zenor	1943	Spiritualism	^{[Melton 2003]} ^{[Lewis 1998]}
Agni Yoga (Roerichism)	Helena Roerich & Nicholas Roerich	1920	Neo-Theosophical	^{[Melton 2003]} ^{[Lewis 1998]} ^{[Jones & Ryan 2007]} ^{[Beit-Hallahmi 1992]}
Ahmadi Religion of Peace and Light	Abdullah Hashem	2015	Shia Islam; Millenarianism	^{[Introvigne & Kotkowska 2024]}
Ahmadiyya	Mirza Ghulam Ahmad	1889	Messianic Islam	^{[Lewis 1998]} ^{[Chryssides 2001]} ^{[Melton 2003]} ^{[Beit-Hallahmi 1992]}
Aiyy Faith, previously Kut-Siur	Lazar Afanasyev (a.k.a. Téris)	1990	Modern Pagan; Neo-Tengrist	
Aladura	Josiah Ositelu	1930	Pentecostal	^{[Melton 2003]}^{[Chryssides 2001]} ^{[Beit-Hallahmi 1992]}
Alamo Christian Foundation, a.k.a. Alamo Christian Church, Consecrated, Alamo Christian Ministries, and Music Square Church	Tony Alamo & Susan Alamo	1969	Fundamentalist Christianity; Communalist	^{[Lewis 1998]} ^{[Chryssides 2001]} ^{[Beit-Hallahmi 1997]} ^{[Beit-Hallahmi 1992]}
Altruria	Edward Biron Payne	1894	Christian; Communal	^{[Melton 2003]} ^{[Lewis 1998]}
American Buddhist Movement		1980	Western Buddhism	^{[Melton 2003]} ^{[Lewis 1998]}
American Buddhist Society and Fellowship, Inc.	Robert Ernest Dickhoff	1945	Tibetan Buddhism	^{[Melton 2003]} ^{[Lewis 1998]}
American World Patriarchs	Uladyslau Ryzy-Ryski	1972	Eastern Orthodox	^{[Melton 2003]} ^{[Lewis 1998]}
Amica Temple of Radiance	Ivah Berg Whitten	1932	Neo-Theosophical	^{[Melton 2003]} ^{[Lewis 1998]}
Ananda Ashrama	Paramananda	1923	Neo-Hindu; Neo-Vedanta	^{[Jones & Ryan 2007]}
Ananda Marga	Prabhat Ranjan Sarkar	1955	Neo-Hindu; Tantric	^{[Melton 2003]} ^{[Jones & Ryan 2007]} ^{[Beit-Hallahmi 1992]} ^{[Lewis 1998]} ^{[Chryssides 2001]}
Ananda movement, including Ananda World Brotherhood Colonies and Ananda Church of Self-Realization	Kriyananda	1968	Neo-Hindu; Self-Realization Fellowship	^{[Jones & Ryan 2007]}
Shree Shree Anandamayee Sangha	Anandamayi Ma	1920s	Neo-Hindu	^{[Jones & Ryan 2007]}
Ancient British Church in North America	Jonathan V. Zotique	1976	LGBTQ-oriented Christianity; Progressive Christianity	^{[Melton 2003]} ^{[Lewis 1998]}
Ancient Mystical Order Rosae Crucis	H. Spencer Lewis	1915	Rosicrucianism	^{[Lewis 1998]} ^{[Chryssides 2001]} ^{[Melton 2003]} ^{[Beit-Hallahmi 1992]}
Ancient Teachings of the Masters (ATOM)	Darwin Gross	1983	Sant Mat; Eckankar	^{[Melton 2003]} ^{[Clarke 2006]} ^{[Lewis 1998]}
Anglo-Saxon Federation of America	Howard B. Rand	1928	British Israelism	^{[Melton 2003]} ^{[Lewis 1998]} ^{[Beit-Hallahmi 1992]}
Ansaaru Allah Community	Dwight York (a.k.a. As Siddid Al Imaan Al Haahi Al Mahdi)	late 1960s	Black Islam	^{[Melton 2003]} ^{[Lewis 1998]}
Ant Hill Kids, a.k.a. Holy Moses Mountain Family	Roch Thériault	1977	Seventh-day Adventist	
Anthroposophy (Anthroposophical Society)	Rudolf Steiner	1912	Western esotericism	^{[Chryssides 2001]} ^{[Lewis 1998]} ^{[Beit-Hallahmi 1997]}
Antiochian Catholic Church in America	Gordon Mar Peter	1980s	Independent Catholicism; Monophysitism	^{[Melton 2003]} ^{[Lewis 1998]}
Antoinism	Louis-Joseph Antoine	1910	Christianity; Faith healing	^{[Beit-Hallahmi 1992]}
Apostles of Infinite Love, a.k.a. the Order of Magnificat of the Mother of God	Michel Collin & Jean-Gaston Tremblay	1961	Catholic	
Apostolic Christian Church (Nazarean)	Samuel Heinrich Froehlich	1906	European Free church	^{[Melton 2003]} ^{[Lewis 1998]}
Apostolic Christian Church of America	Samuel Heinrich Froehlich	1830	European Free church	^{[Melton 2003]} ^{[Lewis 1998]}
Apostolic Church	Daniel Powell Williams	1916	Pentecostal	^{[Beit-Hallahmi 1997]} ^{[Beit-Hallahmi 1992]}
Apostolic Church of Christ (Pentecostal)	Johnnie Draft & Wallace Snow	1969	Oneness Pentecostalism	^{[Melton 2003]} ^{[Lewis 1998]}
Apostolic Overcoming Holy Church of God	William Thomas Phillips	1920	Oneness Pentecostalism	^{[Melton 2003]} ^{[Beit-Hallahmi 1992]}
Arcane School, a.k.a. Lucis Trust	Foster & Alice Bailey	1923 or 1937	Neo-Theosophical	^{[Beit-Hallahmi 1992]}^{[Beit-Hallahmi 1997]}^{[Chryssides 2001]}^{[Melton 2003]}
Arica School	Oscar Ichazo	1968	Sufism	^{[Melton 2003]} ^{[Chryssides 2001]} ^{[Beit-Hallahmi 1992]}
Art of Living Foundation, a.k.a. the Association for Inner Growth and "Ved Vignan Maha Vidya Preeth"	Ravi Shankar	1981/1982	Neo-Hindu	^{[Jones & Ryan 2007]} ^{[Melton 2003]}
Arya Samaj	Dayananda Saraswati	1875	Neo-Hindu	^{[Melton 2003]} ^{[Chryssides 2001]} ^{[Jones & Ryan 2007]} ^{[Beit-Hallahmi 1992]}
Aryan Nations, a.k.a. the Church of Jesus Christ–Christian	Wesley Swift	late 1940s	British Israelism; Christian Identity	^{[Melton 2003]} ^{[Chryssides 2001]}
Asatru Folk Assembly	Stephen McNallen	1970s	Modern Pagan; Polytheistic reconstructionism Heathenry	
Assemblies of God	merger	1914	Pentecostalism	^{[Chryssides 2001]} ^{[Clarke 2006]}
Assemblies of the Lord Jesus Christ	merger	1952	Oneness Pentecostalism	^{[Melton 2003]} ^{[Beit-Hallahmi 1992]}
Assembly of Christian Soldiers	Jessie L. Thrift	1971	Christian Identity; Ku Klux Klan	^{[Melton 2003]} ^{[Beit-Hallahmi 1992]}
Assembly of Man	Franklin Merrell-Wolff	1928	Eastern and Western esotericism	
Association for Research and Enlightenment	Edgar Cayce	1931	Occult	^{[Beit-Hallahmi 1997]} ^{[Chryssides 2001]} ^{[Beit-Hallahmi 1992]}
Association of Vineyard Churches, a.k.a. the Vineyard Movement	John Wimber	1982	Neo-charismatic; Trinitarian Pentecostal	^{[Melton 2003]} ^{[Beit-Hallahmi 1992]}
The Atheopagan Society	Mark A. Green	2012	Pagan	
Aumism	Gilbert Bourdin	1969	Syncretic esotericism-Hinduism	
Aum Shinrikyo, a.k.a. Aleph	Shoko Asahara	1987	Japanese; Japanese Buddhism	^{[Melton 2003]} ^{[Beit-Hallahmi 1992]} ^{[Chryssides 2001]}
Ausar Auset Society	R.A. Straughn	mid-1970s	Rosicrucianism	^{[Melton 2003]} ^{[Beit-Hallahmi 1992]}
Azalism, a.k.a. Azali Babism	Subh-i-Azal	1863	Babism	
Bábism	Ali Muhammad Shirazi (a.k.a. the Báb)	1844	Shia Islam; Millenarianism	^{[Lewis 1998]}
Baháʼí Faith	Bahá'u'lláh (Mírzá Ḥusayn-'Alí Nuri)	1863	Millenarian Babism	^{[Chryssides 2001]} ^{[Clarke 2006]} ^{[Melton 2003]} ^{[Beit-Hallahmi 1992]} ^{[Miller 1995]}
Bawa Muhaiyaddeen Fellowship	Bawa Muhaiyaddeen	1971	Sufism	^{[Melton 2003]} ^{[Chryssides 2001]}
Bethel Ministerial Association	Albert Franklin Varnell	1934	Oneness Pentecostalism	^{[Melton 2003]} ^{[Beit-Hallahmi 1992]}
Bible Presbyterian Church	Carl McIntire	1938	Reformed Presbyterian	^{[Melton 2003]} ^{[Beit-Hallahmi 1992]}
Bible Way Church of Our Lord Jesus Christ	schism	1957	Oneness Pentecostalism	^{[Melton 2003]} ^{[Lewis 1998]} ^{[Beit-Hallahmi 1992]}
Biosophy	Ignaz Paul Vitalis Troxler, F. W. J. Schelling	1806		
Blackburn Cult, a.k.a. the Divine Order of the Royal Arms of the Great Eleven	May Otis Blackburn	1922	Modern Pagan; New Thought	
Brahma Kumaris	Dada Lekhraj	1936/1937	Neo-Hindu	^{[Chryssides 2001]} ^{[Melton 2003]} ^{[Jones & Ryan 2007]} ^{[Beit-Hallahmi 1992]}
Brahmo Samaj, a.k.a. Adi Dharm	Ram Mohan Roy	1828	Neo-Hindu; Unitarian Universalism	^{[Jones & Ryan 2007]}
Brahmoism (a.k.a. Brahmo Dharma)	Debendranath Tagore	1848 or 1850	Neo-Hindu; Unitarian Universalism	
Branch Davidians	Benjamin Roden	1930	Seventh-day Adventist; Shepherd's Rod	^{[Melton 2003]} ^{[Chryssides 2001]} ^{[Beit-Hallahmi 1992]}
Branhamism	William M. Branham	1951	Oneness Pentecostalism	^{[Nichols, Mather & Schmidt 2006]}
Inedia, a.k.a. Breatharianism	Wiley Brooks	1970s	Hinduism-influenced	^{[Chryssides 2001]}
The Brethren (Jim Roberts group), a.k.a. The Body of Christ and The Garbage Eaters	Jimmie T. Roberts	c. 1970	Unclassified Christianity	^{[Melton 2003]}
British Israelism, a.k.a. Anglo-Israelism		1870s		^{[Chryssides 2001]} ^{[Beit-Hallahmi 1992]}
Brotherhood of the Golden Arrow (defunct)	Maria de Naglowska	1932	Occult; Western esotericism Satanism	
Bruderhof, a.k.a. the Hutterian Brethren and Hutterian Society of Brothers	Eberhard Arnold	c. 1920	Communalist	^{[Melton 2003]} ^{[Chryssides 2001]}
Brunstad Christian Church	Johan Oscar Smith	1905	Evangelical nondenominational Christianity	^{[Beit-Hallahmi 1992]}
Buddhayana	Ashin Jinarakkhita	1955	Buddhism	^{[Chia 2018]} ^{[Chia 2020]}
Builders of the Adytum	Paul Foster Case	1922	Ritual magic	^{[Melton 2003]} ^{[Chryssides 2001]} ^{[Beit-Hallahmi 1992]}
Burkhanism or Ak Jang	Chet Chelpan; Chugul Sarok Chandyk	1904	Altaian Millenarian-Indigenist; Tengrist	
Cao Dai, a.k.a. Dai Dao Tam Ky Pho Do	Ngô Văn Chiêu & Lê Văn Trung	1919	Syncretistic; Vietnamese millenarianism	^{[Beit-Hallahmi 1997]} ^{[Chryssides 2001]} ^{[Beit-Hallahmi 1992]}
Cargo cults		1885	Syncretistic; Millenarian-Indigenist	^{[Chryssides 2001]} ^{[Beit-Hallahmi 1997]} ^{[Beit-Hallahmi 1992]}
Carlebach movement	Shlomo Carlebach	late 1960s	Neo-Hasidic Rabbinic Judaism	
Celestial Church of Christ	Samuel Oshoffa	1947	Indigenist; Pentecostal	^{[Beit-Hallahmi 1997]} ^{[Chryssides 2001]}
The Centers Network		1981		^{[Chryssides 2001]}
Chabad, a.k.a. Chabad-Lubavitch	Shneur Zalman of Liadi	1775	Hasidic Rabbinic Judaism	^{[Chryssides 2001]} ^{[Beit-Hallahmi 1992]}
Charismatic Movement, a.k.a. neo-Pentecostalism		1950s–1960s	Charismatic Christianity	^{[Clarke 2006]} ^{[Nichols, Mather & Schmidt 2006]} ^{[Chryssides 2001]}
Chen Tao, a.k.a. God's Salvation Church and God Saves the Earth Flying Saucer Foundation	Hon-Ming Chen	1955	UFO religion	^{[Chryssides 2001]}
Cheondoism, a.k.a. Chendogyo	Choe Je-u	1905		^{[Chryssides 2001]}
Cherubim and Seraphim, a.k.a. the Sacred Cherubim and Seraphim Society and Eternal Sacred Order of Cherubim and Seraphim	Moses Orimolade Tunolase	c. 1925	African Pentecostal	^{[Beit-Hallahmi 1997]} ^{[Chryssides 2001]}
Children of Thunder	Glenn Helzer	2000	Latter-day Saint Movement	
Christ Apostolic Church	Joseph Ayo Babalola	1941	Pentecostal	^{[Melton 2003]} ^{[Chryssides 2001]}
Christadelphians, a.k.a. Thomasites	John Thomas	1844	Baptist; Restorationism	^{[Chryssides 2001]} ^{[Nichols, Mather & Schmidt 2006]} ^{[Melton 2003]} ^{[Beit-Hallahmi 1992]}
The Christian Community, a.k.a. the Christian Community Church and Christengemeinschaft	Rudolf Steiner; Friedrich Rittelmeyer	1922	Anthroposophy	^{[Beit-Hallahmi 1997]} ^{[Chryssides 2001]}
Christian Identity, a.k.a. the Identity Movement	1870s	1940s	British Israelism	^{[Melton 2003]} ^{[Beit-Hallahmi 1992]} ^{[Chryssides 2001]} ^{[Clarke 2006]}
Christian Reformed Church in North America	Gijsbert Haan	1857	Reformed Presbyterian	^{[Melton 2003]} ^{[Chryssides 2001]}
Christian Science, a.k.a. Church of Christ, Scientist	Mary Baker Eddy	1876	Christianity; Faith healing New Thought	^{[Chryssides 2001]} ^{[Melton 2003]}
Christian World Liberation Front, a.k.a. the Spiritual Counterfeits Project	Jack Sparks, Fred Dyson, & Pat Matrisciana	1969	Fundamentalist Christianity; Millenarianism	^{[Beit-Hallahmi 1997]} ^{[Chryssides 2001]}
Church of All Worlds	Tim Zell & Lance Christie	1962	Witchcraft; Modern Pagan	^{[Melton 2003]} ^{[Beit-Hallahmi 1992]} ^{[Chryssides 2001]}
Church of Aphrodite (defunct)	Gleb Botkin	1938	Modern Pagan; Goddess movement	^{[Melton 2003]} ^{[Beit-Hallahmi 1992]}
Church of Bible Understanding	Stewart Traill	1971	Adventism; Fundamentalist Christianity	^{[Beit-Hallahmi 1997]} ^{[Chryssides 2001]} ^{[Beit-Hallahmi 1992]}
Church of Euthanasia	Chris Korda & Robert Kimberk	1992	Parody religion	
Church of Daniel's Band		1893	Non-Episcopal Methodism	^{[Melton 2003]} ^{[Beit-Hallahmi 1992]}
Church of Divine Science	Malinda Cramer	1888	New Thought; Faith healing	^{[Miller 1995]}
Church of God in Christ	Charles Harrison Mason	1908	Pentecostal	^{[Beit-Hallahmi 1997]} ^{[Beit-Hallahmi 1992]}
The Church of God (Jerusalem Acres)	Grady R. Kent	1957	White Trinitarian; Holiness movement Pentecostal	^{[Melton 2003]} ^{[Beit-Hallahmi 1992]}
Church of God Mountain Assembly	J.H. Parks, Steve N. Bryant, Tom Moses and William O. Douglas	1906	White Trinitarian; Holiness movement Pentecostal	^{[Melton 2003]} ^{[Beit-Hallahmi 1992]}
Church of God of Prophecy	Ambrose Tomlinson	1903	White Trinitarian; Holiness movement Pentecostal	^{[Melton 2003]} ^{[Beit-Hallahmi 1992]}
Church of God with Signs Following	George Went Hensley	1920s	Holiness-Pentecostal	^{[Melton 2003]} ^{[Chryssides 2006]}
Church of Israel	Dan Gayman	1974	British Israelism	^{[Melton 2003]} ^{[Beit-Hallahmi 1992]}
Church of Jesus Christ of Latter-day Saints	Joseph Smith	1830	Latter-day Saint movement-Millenarian	
Church of Jesus Christ of Latter Day Saints (Strangite)	Joseph Smith; James Strang	1844	Latter-day Saint movement	
The Church of Light	C.C. Zain	1932	neo-Hermetism	^{[Lewis 1998]}
Church of Satan	Anton LaVey	1966	Satanic	^{[Clarke 2006]} ^{[Chryssides 2001]} ^{[Miller 1995]}
Church of the SubGenius	J.R. "Bob" Dobbs	1979	Parody	
Church of the Creator	Grace Marama URI	1969	Liberal family	^{[Melton 2003]}
Church of the Flying Spaghetti Monster or Pastafarianism	Bobby Henderson	2005	Parody	
Church of the Living Word, a.k.a. The Walk	John Robert Stevens	1954	Fundamentalist; Occult	^{[Beit-Hallahmi 1997]} ^{[Chryssides 2001]}
Church of the Lord (Aladura)	Josiah Ositelu	1930	Pentecostal Family	^{[Melton 2003]} ^{[Chryssides 2001]}
Church of World Messianity	Mokichi Okada	1934	Shinto; Faith healing	^{[Melton 2003]} ^{[Chryssides 2001]} ^{[Beit-Hallahmi 1992]}
Church Universal and Triumphant	Mark Prophet, Elizabeth Clare (Wolf) Prophet	1958	Theosophical; Occult	^{[Beit-Hallahmi 1997]} ^{[Chryssides 2001]} ^{[Beit-Hallahmi 1992]}
Collegiate Association for the Research of Principles, also known as CARP	Sun Myung Moon	1955	Unification Church	^{[Chryssides 2001]}
Commandment Keepers: Holy Church of the Living God	Arnold Josiah Ford	1924	Black Hebrew Israelite	^{[Melton 2003]} ^{[Lewis 1998]} ^{[Beit-Hallahmi 1992]}
Community Chapel and Bible Training Center	Donald Lee Barnett	1967	Latter Rain; Pentecostal	^{[Melton 2003]} ^{[Beit-Hallahmi 1992]}
Concerned Christians	Monte Kim Miller	1980s		^{[Chryssides 2001]}
Conservative Judaism	Sabato Morais, Marcus Jastrow, H. Pereira Mendes	1887	Rabbinic Judaism	^{[Melton 2003]} ^{[Beit-Hallahmi 1992]} ^{[Chryssides 2001]}
Core Shamanism, The Foundation for Shamanic Studies	Michael Harner	1980	Neoshamanism	^{[Clarke 2006]}
Covenant of the Goddess	merger	1975	Goddess; Neopagan witchcraft Modern Pagan; Wiccan	^{[Melton 2003]} ^{[Chryssides 2001]} ^{[Beit-Hallahmi 1992]}
Covenant of Unitarian Universalist Pagans	Margot Adler	1987	Neopagan witchcraft Modern Pagan	^{[Melton 2003]} ^{[Chryssides 2001]} ^{[Beit-Hallahmi 1992]}
The Covenant, the Sword, and the Arm of the Lord	James D. Ellison	1970s, mid	British Israelism	^{[Chryssides 2001]} ^{[Melton 2003]} ^{[Beit-Hallahmi 1992]}
Creativity	Ben Klassen	1970s, early	Pantheism, Agnostic Atheism, White Racialism	
Crossroads Movement		1970s		^{[Chryssides 2006]} ^{[Chryssides 2001]}
Cyberchurches		2000s, early	Non-denominational Christian	^{[Chryssides 2001]}
Dalit Buddhist Movement, a.k.a. Navayana Buddhism	B.R. Ambedkar	1956	Neo-Buddhism	
Dances of Universal Peace	Samuel L. Lewis	1968		
Diamond Way	Ole Nydahl	1972	Tibetan Buddhism, New Age,	
Dianic Wicca	merger	1971	Neopagan witchcraft Modern Pagan; Goddess; Wiccan	^{[Melton 2003]} ^{[Beit-Hallahmi 1992]}
Discordianism	Greg Hill, Kerry Wendell Thornley	1963	Absurdism; Greek Mythology	
Eastern Lightning, a.k.a. the Church of Almighty God	Yang Xiangbin, Zhao Weishan	1991	Chinese house churches	
Eckankar or ECK	Paul Twitchell	1965/1971	Derived from Radha Soami, but denies connection	^{[Clarke 2006]} ^{[Jones & Ryan 2007]} ^{[Melton 2003]} ^{[Beit-Hallahmi 1992]}
Efficacious Spirit Teachings, a.k.a. Spirit Church and The Lingling Sect	Hua Xuehe	1986	Pentecostalism	
Elan Vital, formerly Divine Light Mission	Hans Ji Maharaj	1920s	Derived from Sant Mat, but denies connection	^{[Melton 2003]} ^{[Jones & Ryan 2007]} ^{[Clarke 2006]} ^{[Beit-Hallahmi 1992]}
Emin	Raymond Armin	1971	New Age	
End Time Survivors Jesus Christians	David McKay	1981	Fundamentalist Millennialism	
Esoteric Nazism		1940s, late	Occult; Western esotericism	
Est (Erhard Seminars Training)	Werner Erhard	1981	Human Potential Movement; Self religions	^{[Nichols, Mather & Schmidt 2006]}
Evangelical Association of the Israelite Mission of the New Universal Covenant	Ezequiel Ataucusi Gamonal	1968	Syncretistic Messianic Judaism-Indigenist	
Evangelical Methodist Church	J.H. Hamblen	1946	Non-Episcopal Methodist	^{[Melton 2003]} ^{[Beit-Hallahmi 1992]}
Falun Gong	Li Hongzhi	1992	Qigong movement	^{[Melton 2003]}
The Family, a.k.a. Santiniketan Park Association & Great White Brotherhood	Anne Hamilton-Byrne	1963	New Age	
Family International, previously the Children of God, the Family of Love and the Family	David Berg	1968	Fundamentalist, Jesus movement, countercultural evangelical	^{[Beit-Hallahmi 1997]} ^{[Clarke 2006]}
Fellowship of Isis	Olivia Robertson	1976	Modern Pagan; Goddess	^{[Melton 2003]} ^{[Beit-Hallahmi 1992]}
Fellowships of the Remnant	Denver Snuffer Jr.	2013	Latter-day Saint Movement	
Feraferia	Frederick Adams	1967	Modern Pagan; Goddess	
Feri Tradition	Victor Henry Anderson, Cora Anderson	1960, circa	Goddess; Neopagan witchcraft Modern Pagan; Wiccan	
Findhorn Foundation	Eileen Caddy, Peter Caddy, Alexis Edwards, Roger Benson	1963	Christian-Anthroposophistical-Rosicrucian	^{[Beit-Hallahmi 1997]} ^{[Beit-Hallahmi 1992]}
Fire Baptized Holiness Church of God of the Americas	W.E. Fuller	1898	Black Trinitarian Pentecostal	^{[Melton 2003]} ^{[Beit-Hallahmi 1992]}
First Satanic Church	Karla LaVey	1997	Satanic	
Followers of Christ	Marion Reece (or Riess)	1800s, late	Unclassified Pentecostal	^{[Melton 2003]}
Fourth Way	George Gurdjieff	1913–1916	Esoteric; Esoteric Sufism	^{[Clarke 2006]} ^{[Miller 1995]}
Fraternitas Rosae Crucis	Paschal Beverly Randolph	1858	Rosicrucianism	^{[Melton 2003]} ^{[Beit-Hallahmi 1992]}
Fraternity of the Inner Light	Dion Fortune	1924	neo-Hermeticism; Esoteric Christianity	^{[Clarke 2006]}
Freedomites		1902		^{[Beit-Hallahmi 1992]}
Fundamentalist Christianity		1800s, late	Christian	^{[Beit-Hallahmi 1992]}
Fundamentalist Church of Jesus Christ of Latter-Day Saints	Lorin C. Woolley	1929	Latter-day Saint Movement	
General Church of the New Jerusalem	schism	1890	Swedenborgianism	^{[Melton 2003]} ^{[Beit-Hallahmi 1992]}
The Genesis II Church of Health and Healing	Jim Humble	2009/2010	UFO-New Age inspired Pseudoscience	
Gentle Wind Project	John "Tubby" Miller and Mary "Moe" Miller	1980	Spiritualism	
Ghost Dance	Wovoka	1889	Native American; Indigenist; Fundamentalist	^{[Beit-Hallahmi 1992]}
Global Peace Foundation	Hyun Jin Moon	2007	Unification Church	
Goddess movement		1960s, late	Modern Pagan	^{[Clarke 2006]}
Godianism, a.k.a. Chiism	K.O.K. Onyioha	1949	African Indigenist Modern Pagan	^{[Clarke 2006]}
Grail Movement	Oskar Ernst Bernhardt	1924	Syncretistic Christian; New Age; Channeling	^{[Melton 2003]} ^{[Beit-Hallahmi 1992]}
Hanuman Foundation	Richard Alpert (Ram Dass)	1974/1980	Neo-Hindu	^{[Nichols, Mather & Schmidt 2006]} ^{[Jones & Ryan 2007]} ^{[Melton 2003]} ^{[Beit-Hallahmi 1992]}
Happy Science (Kofuku-no-Kagaku)	Ryuho Okawa	1986	Japanese	
Heaven's Gate formerly Human Individual Metamorphosis and Total Overcomers Anonymous	Marshall Herff Applewhite, Bonnie Lu Nettles	1973	Syncretistic Christian; New Age; UFO religion	
Hikari no Wa	Fumihiro Joyu	2007	Aum Shinrikyo	
Himalayan Institute of Yoga Science and Philosophy	Swami Rama	1971	Hindu	^{[Melton 2003]} ^{[Jones & Ryan 2007]} ^{[Beit-Hallahmi 1992]}
House of Israel	David Hill a.k.a. Rabbi Edward Washington	1972	Black Hebrew Israelites	
Humanistic Judaism	Sherwin Wine	1965	Nontheistic Rabbinic Judaism	^{[Clarke 2006]}
Human Sacrifices Sect of Nacozari	Silvia Meraz	2009	Santa Muerte	
Huna	Max Freedom Long	1936	New Thought; New Age; Hawaiian religion	^{[Lewis 1998]}
I AM Activity	Guy Ballard, Edna Anne Wheeler Ballard	1930s, early	Neo-Theosophical	^{[Melton 2003]} ^{[Beit-Hallahmi 1992]}
Iglesia ni Cristo	Felix Manalo	1913, formally 1914	Restorationism; Nontrinitarian; Fundamentalist	^{[Clarke 2006]}
Independent Fundamental Churches of America	R. Lee Kirkland	1922	Unaffiliated Fundamentalist	^{[Beit-Hallahmi 1997]} ^{[Beit-Hallahmi 1992]}
Indian Shaker Church	John and Marry Slocum	1881	Native American and Christian	
Insight Meditation Society	Jack Kornfield, Sharon Salzberg, Joseph Goldstein	1976	Theravada	^{[Melton 2003]} ^{[Beit-Hallahmi 1992]}
International Society for Krishna Consciousness (ISKCON), a.k.a. Hare Krishna movement	A.C. Bhaktivedanta Swami Prabhupada	1966	Hindu	^{[Jones & Ryan 2007]}
International House of Prayer, a.k.a. IHOP or IHOPKC	Mike Bickle	1999	Charismatic Movement; Post-tribulational; Historic premillennialism	
International Church of the Foursquare Gospel	Aimee Semple McPherson	1923	White Trinitarian Pentecostal	^{[Melton 2003]} ^{[Beit-Hallahmi 1992]}
International Community of Christ, a.k.a. Church of the Second Advent (CSA) and Jamilians	Eugene Douglas Savoy	1972	New Age	^{[Nichols, Mather & Schmidt 2006]}
Iriadamant	Pierre Doris Maltais	1973	Animism; Native American; Spiritual ecology	
Isha Foundation	Jaggi Vasudev	1992	Hindu	
ISKCON Revival Movement (IRM)	?	2000	Neo-Hindu; ISKCON	^{[Jones & Ryan 2007]}
Ivanovism (the Ivanovites)	Porfiry Ivanov	1933	Syncretistic; Modern Pagan; Slavic Native Faith	
Jediism		2000s	Star Wars-inspired; New Age	
Jehovah's Witnesses	Charles Taze Russell	1870	Adventist; Bible Students; Nontrinitarian	^{[Melton 2003]} ^{[Beit-Hallahmi 1992]}
Jesus Army, a.k.a. "Jesus Fellowship Church" and "Bugbrooke Jesus Fellowship"	Noel Stanton	1977	Fundamentalist; Communal	^{[Beit-Hallahmi 1992]}
Jesus Movement		1960s, late	Fundamentalist	^{[Beit-Hallahmi 1997]} ^{[Beit-Hallahmi 1992]}
Jewish Renewal	Zalman Schachter-Shalomi	1970s, mid	Neo-Hasidic Rabbinic Judaism; Syncretistic	
Jews for Jesus	Moishe Rosen	1970	Fundamentalist; Messianic Judaism	^{[Beit-Hallahmi 1997]} ^{[Beit-Hallahmi 1992]}
John Frum		1936	Syncretistic; Millenarian	^{[Beit-Hallahmi 1997]} ^{[Beit-Hallahmi 1992]}
Joy of Satan Ministries	Andrea Maxine Dietrich	2002	Satanism	
Kabbalah Centre	Philip Berg	1970s	Kabbalist; New Age	^{[Clarke 2006]}
Karma Triyana Dharmachakra	the 16th Gyalwa Karmapa	1976	Tibetan Buddhism	^{[Melton 2003]} ^{[Beit-Hallahmi 1992]}
Keetoowah Society	Redbird Smith (co-founder)	1858	Native American; Indigenist	
Kemetic Orthodoxy	Tamara Siuda	1988	Modern Pagan; Polytheistic reconstructionism Kemetic	
Kerista	John Presmont	1956	Communal—After 1960	^{[Melton 2003]} ^{[Beit-Hallahmi 1992]}
Kopimism	Isak Gerson	2012	Internet religion	
Konkokyo	Bunjirō Kawate	1859	Japanese; Shinto	^{[Melton 2003]} ^{[Beit-Hallahmi 1992]}
Krishnamurti Foundations	Jiddu Krishnamurti	1928	Neo-Theosophical; Universalism	
Kripalu Center (Kirpalu)	Amrit Desai	1966	Hindu	^{[Melton 2003]} ^{[Beit-Hallahmi 1992]}
Lama Foundation	Steve Durkee	1967	Communal	^{[Melton 2003]} ^{[Beit-Hallahmi 1992]}
Latter Day Saint movement (Mormonism)	Joseph Smith	1830	Christian restorationism	^{[Nichols, Mather & Schmidt 2006]} ^{[Beit-Hallahmi 1992]}
Latter Rain Movement	George Hawtin, Percy Hunt	1946	Millenarian Pentecostal	^{[Beit-Hallahmi 1997]} ^{[Beit-Hallahmi 1992]}
Laymen's Home Missionary Movement	Paul S.L. Johnson	1920, circa	Adventist; Bible Students	^{[Melton 2003]} ^{[Beit-Hallahmi 1992]}
Lectorium Rosicrucianum	Jan van Rijckenborgh; Zwier Willem Leene; Catharose de Petri	1924	Rosicrucianism	^{[Clarke 2006]} ^{[Melton 2003]} ^{[Beit-Hallahmi 1992]}
The Living Word Fellowship	John Robert Stevens	1951	Latter Rain Pentecostal	^{[Melton 2003]}
Local Church movement	Ni Shu-tsu (Watchman Nee)	1920s	Independent Fundamentalist	^{[Melton 2003]} ^{[Beit-Hallahmi 1992]}
Longhouse Religion	Handsome Lake alias Sganyodaiyoˀ	1797	Native American; Indigenist	
Love Family, a.k.a. the Church of Jesus Christ at Armageddon and Love Israel	Paul Erdman	1969	Communal	^{[Beit-Hallahmi 1997]} ^{[Chryssides 2001]}
Love Has Won	Amy Carlson	2005, circa	New Age	
Lumpa Church	Alice Lenshina	1953	African initiated church	
Mahikari	Kotama Okada	1959	Shinto	^{[Melton 2003]} ^{[Beit-Hallahmi 1992]}
Makasol (Wind Nation), a.k.a. Paliau movement	Paliau Maloat	1970s, circa	Papuan Indigenist; Millenarian countercultural	^{[Clarke 2006]}
Manson Family	Charles Manson	1967	Millenarianism	
Maranatha Campus Ministries	Bob Weiner	1972	Pentecostal	^{[Beit-Hallahmi 1997]} ^{[Beit-Hallahmi 1992]}
Martinus' Spiritual Science	Martinus Thomsen	1932	Esoteric	
Mata Amritanandamayi Math	Mata Amritanandamayi	1981	Neo-Hindu	^{[Clarke 2006]} ^{[Jones & Ryan 2007]}
Mazdaznan	Otoman Zar-Adusht Ha'nish	1902	Zoroastrianism	^{[Melton 2003]} ^{[Beit-Hallahmi 1992]}
Meher Baba followers	Merwan Sheriar Irani	1921	Hindu-inspired	^{[Melton 2003]}
Mespilism		2000s	Buddhism, Paganism, New Age, Syncretism, Humanism	
Messianic Judaism		1960s	Judeo-Christian	^{[Clarke 2006]} ^{[Beit-Hallahmi 1992]}
Mita Congregation	Juanita García Peraza	1940	Deliverance Pentecostal	^{[Melton 2003]} ^{[Beit-Hallahmi 1992]}
Modekngei (Ngara Modekngei)	Tamadad from Chol	1915, circa	Syncretistic Christian-Indigenous	
Monastic Order of Avallon	Henri Hillion de Coatmoc'han	1972	Modern Pagan	
Moody Church	Dwight L. Moody	1864	Fundamentalist; Evangelical	^{[Melton 2003]} ^{[Beit-Hallahmi 1992]}
Moorish Science Temple of America	Timothy Drew	1925	Black Islam	^{[Melton 2003]} ^{[Beit-Hallahmi 1992]}
Moral Re-Armament	Frank N.D. Buchman	1921		^{[Beit-Hallahmi 1997]} ^{[Beit-Hallahmi 1992]}
Movement for the Restoration of the Ten Commandments of God	Credonia Mwerinde, Joseph Kibweteere	1989	Catholicism	
Movement of Spiritual Inner Awareness	John-Roger Hinkins	1971	Syncretistic; Sant Mat and Eckankar-influenced	^{[Jones & Ryan 2007]} ^{[Clarke 2006]} ^{[Melton 2003]} ^{[Beit-Hallahmi 1992]}
Namdhari	Balak Singh	1800s, mid	Sikh	^{[Beit-Hallahmi 1997]} ^{[Beit-Hallahmi 1992]}
Narcosatánicos	Adolfo Constanzo	1985	Palo	
Nation of Islam	Elijah Muhammad	1930s, mid	Black Islam; UFO religion	^{[Beit-Hallahmi 1997]}
Nation of Yahweh	Hulon Mitchell, Jr.	1970s	Black Hebrew Israelite	^{[Beit-Hallahmi 1992]} ^{[Melton 2003]}
National Spiritualist Association of Churches	Harrison D. Barrett, James M. Peebles, Cora L. Richmond	1893	Spiritualism	^{[Melton 2003]} ^{[Beit-Hallahmi 1992]}
Native American Church, a.k.a. Peyotism	Quanah Parker	1800–19th century	Native American; Indigenist Entheogen groups	^{[Melton 2003]} ^{[Beit-Hallahmi 1992]}
Native Ukrainian National Faith, a.k.a. RUNVira or Sylenkoism	Lev Sylenko	1960s, mid	Modern Pagan; Slavic Native Faith	
Neo-charismatic movement		1980s, early	Charismatic Christian; Nondenominational Christian	
Neo-Hinduism or Reform Hinduism		1830, circa	Hindu	^{[Clarke 2006]}
Néo-Phare	Arnaud Mussy	2001	Esoteric, apocalyptic	
New Acropolis (Nouvelle Acropole)	Jorge Ángel Livraga Rizzi	1957	Neo-Theosophical; Western esotericism	^{[Clarke 2006]}
New Apostolic Church	Heinrich Geyer	1863	Catholic Apostolic Church; Unclassified Christian Churches	^{[Melton 2003]} ^{[Beit-Hallahmi 1992]}
New Kadampa Tradition	Geshe Kelsang Gyatso	1970s, mid	Tibetan Buddhism	^{[Melton 2003]}
The New Message from God	Marshall Vian Summers	1992	UFO religion	
New Reformed Orthodox Order of the Golden Dawn		1969	Hermetic Order of the Golden Dawn; Witchcraft; Modern Pagan	^{[Melton 2003]} ^{[Beit-Hallahmi 1992]}
New Thought	Phineas Parkhurst Quimby	1800s, mid	Metaphysical; Faith healing	^{[Beit-Hallahmi 1997]} ^{[Miller 1995]} ^{[Beit-Hallahmi 1992]}
Noahidism		1990s	Orthodox Judaism-inspired	
Nuwaubian Nation or United Nuwaubian Nation of Moors	Dwight York	1967	UFO religion, New Age, Christian, Jewish, Black supremacist	
Oahspe Faithists	John Ballou Newbrough	1882	UFO religion	
Odinism	Orestes Brownson	1848	Modern Pagan	
Oneida Community	John Humphrey Noyes	1848	Perfectionism	
Oneness Movement a.k.a. Oneness University	Kalki Bhagawan	1989	Indian religions-inspired New Age; Neo-Hindu; 2012 phenomenon-inspired	
Oomoto	Nao Deguchi	1899	Japanese; Shinto-Millenarian	^{[Beit-Hallahmi 1997]} ^{[Beit-Hallahmi 1992]}
Open Bible Standard Churches	merger	1935	White Trinitarian Pentecostal	^{[Melton 2003]} ^{[Beit-Hallahmi 1992]}
Opus Dei	Saint Josemaría Escrivá de Balaguer	1928	Roman Catholic	^{[Clarke 2006]}
Order of the Solar Temple	Joseph Di Mambro, Luc Jouret	1984	Rosicrucian	
Ordo Templi Orientis (O.T.O.)	Carl Kellner; Theodor Reuss	1895/1906	Western esotericism Neo-Hermetism; Thelema	^{[Clarke 2006]} ^{[Beit-Hallahmi 1997]}
Pealeism	Norman Vincent Peale	1942	Non-denominational Christianity	
Pentecostal Church of God		1919	Pentecostal	^{[Beit-Hallahmi 1992]}
Pentecostalism		1900s	Charismatic Christian	^{[Beit-Hallahmi 1992]}
People Unlimited, also known as Eternal Flame Foundation, People Forever, and CBJ	Charles Paul Brown, Bernadeane Brown, James Russell Strole	1982	Immortalism, Christianity	^{[Lewis 1998]}
Peoples Temple	Jim Jones	1955	Christian socialism	^{[Melton 2003]} ^{[Beit-Hallahmi 1992]}
Philosophical Research Society	Manly Palmer Hall	1934	Occult	^{[Melton 2003]} ^{[Beit-Hallahmi 1992]}
Pilgrims of Arès	Michel Potay	1974		
Plymouth Brethren	John Nelson Darby	1830	evangelical Millenarian	^{[Beit-Hallahmi 1997]} ^{[Chryssides 2001]} ^{[Beit-Hallahmi 1992]}
Potter's House also known as: Christian Fellowship Ministries (CFM), The Door, Victory Chapel, Christian Center, Crossroads Chapel, etc.	Wayman Mitchell	1970	Pentecostal	^{[Nichols, Mather & Schmidt 2006]}
Process Church of the Final Judgement	Mary Ann MacLean and Robert de Grimston	1963	Satanism	
Quiverfull	Mary Pride	1985	Christian Natalism	
Radha Soami, also Radhasoami Movement or Sant Mat movement	Shiv Dayal Singh	1861	Sikh-derived or Syncretistic Sikh-Hindu or Sant Mat-inspired	^{[Jones & Ryan 2007]} ^{[Clarke 2006]} ^{[Melton 2003]}
Radha Soami Satsang Beas	Baba Jaimal Singh	1891	Sant Mat; Radha Soami	^{[Jones & Ryan 2007]} ^{[Melton 2003]} ^{[Clarke 2006]} ^{[Beit-Hallahmi 1992]}
Radha Soami Satsang Dayalbagh	Kamta Prasad Sinha	1907	Radha Soami	^{[Jones & Ryan 2007]}
Raëlism, a.k.a. Raëlian Church	Claude Vorilhon (Rael)	1973/1974	UFO religion	^{[Melton 2003]} ^{[Clarke 2006]} ^{[Beit-Hallahmi 1992]}
Rainbow Family, a.k.a. Rainbow Coalition	Barry Adams or Jesse Jackson	1960s, late	Communal; Afro-American	^{[Melton 2003]} ^{[Clarke 2006]} ^{[Beit-Hallahmi 1992]}
Rajneesh movement, a.k.a. Osho movement	Rajneesh Chandra Mohan	1966	Indian religions-inspired Syncretistic	^{[Clarke 2006]} ^{[Jones & Ryan 2007]} ^{[Melton 2003]} ^{[Beit-Hallahmi 1992]}
Ramakrishna Mission, a.k.a. Ramakrishna movement or Vedanta Society	Swami Vivekananda	1897	Neo-Hindu; Neo-Vedanta	^{[Beit-Hallahmi 1992]} ^{[Jones & Ryan 2007]} ^{[Beit-Hallahmi 1997]}
Ramtha's School of Enlightenment	J.Z. Knight	1977	New Age	
Rastafari	Leonard Howell, Joseph Hibbert, Archibald Dunkley, Robert Hinds	1920s/1935	Jewish and Christian-influenced Afro-centric	^{[Melton 2003]} ^{[Clarke 2006]} ^{[Beit-Hallahmi 1992]}
Reconstructionist Judaism	Mordecai Kaplan	1922	Rabbinic Judaism	^{[Clarke 2006]}
Reform Judaism, a.k.a. Progressive or Liberal Judaism	Isaac Harby; Isaac M. Wise; others	1820s	Rabbinic Judaism	^{[Clarke 2006]}
Reformed Druids of North America		1960s	Modern Pagan	^{[Beit-Hallahmi 1997]} ^{[Beit-Hallahmi 1992]}
Reiki, also Usui Shiko Ryoho System of Healing	Mikao Usui	1922	Energy medicine Japanese Buddhism	^{[Clarke 2006]}
Religious Science	Ernest Holmes	1948	New Thought	^{[Beit-Hallahmi 1997]} ^{[Beit-Hallahmi 1992]}
Ringing Cedars' Anastasianism	Vladimir Megre	1997	Syncretistic; Modern Pagan; Slavic Native Faith	
Risshō Kōsei Kai	Nikkyo Niwano, Myoko Naganuma	1938	Nichiren Buddhist	^{[Beit-Hallahmi 1992]}
The Rosicrucian Fellowship	Carl Louis von Grasshof	1909	Rosicrucianism	^{[Melton 2003]} ^{[Beit-Hallahmi 1992]}
Ruhani Satsang, a.k.a. Kirpal Light Satsang	Kirpal Singh	1948	Radha Soami	^{[Jones & Ryan 2007]} ^{[Clarke 2006]}
Sacred Name Movement	Clarence Orvil Dodd	1930s	Judeo-Christian (Judaizers); Nontrinitarian; Church of God (Seventh-Day)	^{[Clarke 2006]} ^{[Beit-Hallahmi 1992]}
Sadharan Brahmo Samaj	Anandamohan Bose, Sivanath Sastri, Umesh Chandra Dutta	1878	Brahmoism	
Sahaja Yoga	Shri Mataji Nirmala Devi	1970	Neo-Hindu	^{[Melton 2003]} ^{[Jones & Ryan 2007]}
Saiva Siddhanta Church	Subramuniy	1957	Hindu	^{[Jones & Ryan 2007]} ^{[Melton 2003]} ^{[Beit-Hallahmi 1992]}
The Salvation Army	William Booth	1865	Holiness movement	^{[Melton 2003]} ^{[Beit-Hallahmi 1992]}
Saminism, Samin movement	Samin Surosentiko	1889	Abrahamic religions Indigenist	
Sant Nirankari Mission	Baba Buta Singh Ji	1929, formally 1947	Sikh; Nirankari	^{[Jones & Ryan 2007]} ^{[Beit-Hallahmi 1992]}
Santa Muerte Cult		1940s, late (or earlier)	Syncretic Folk Catholic	
Sathya Sai Baba movement or Sai Baba movement	Sathya Sai Baba	1950	Neo-Hindu	^{[Jones & Ryan 2007]} ^{[Clarke 2006]}
Santo Daime	Mestre Irineu	1930s	Folk Catholic; Spiritism; Neoshamanic; Entheogen groups	
The Satanic Temple	Lucien Greaves, Malcolm Jarry	2012	Satanic; Nontheistic	
Science of Identity Foundation (SIF)	Chris Butler alias Jagad Guru Siddhaswarupananda	1977	Neo-Hindu; ISKCON	^{[Jones & Ryan 2007]}
Scientology	L. Ron Hubbard	1955	UFO-Psychic; New Age	^{[Melton 2003]} ^{[Miller 1995]}
Sekta Niebo	Bogdan Kacmajor	1990	Christian	
Seicho-no-Ie	Masaharu Taniguchi, Fenwicke Holmes	1930	Japanese; Religious Science-Shinto	^{[Clarke 2006]}
Self-Realization Fellowship	Paramahansa Yogananda	1935	Neo-Hindu	^{[Melton 2003]} ^{[Jones & Ryan 2007]} ^{[Beit-Hallahmi 1992]}
Semitic Neopaganism	Raphael Patai	1960s	Modern Pagan; Polytheistic reconstructionism Feminism	
Seventh-day Adventist Church	Ellen G. White; Joseph Bates	1860	Adventist; Millerite; Seventh-day Sabbatarian	^{[Melton 2003]} ^{[Beit-Hallahmi 1992]}
Seventh-day Adventist Reform Movement	schism	1925	Seventh-day Adventist	^{[Melton 2003]} ^{[Beit-Hallahmi 1992]}
Shakers	Ann Lee	1750s	Communal—Before 1960	^{[Melton 2003]} ^{[Beit-Hallahmi 1992]}
Shengdao, a.k.a. Tongshanshe	Peng Tairong (Ruzun)	1900s, early	Chinese salvationist	
Shepherd's Rod, a.k.a. the Davidians, officially, the Davidian Seventh-day Adventist Association	Victor T. Houteff	1935	Seventh-day Adventist	^{[Melton 2003]} ^{[Lewis 1998]}
Shiloh Youth Revival Centers	John J. Higgins, Jr.	1969	Communal—After 1960	^{[Melton 2003]} ^{[Beit-Hallahmi 1992]}
Shincheonji Church of Jesus	Lee Man-hee	1984	Christian	
Shinji Shumeikai, a.k.a. Shumei	Mihoko Koyama	1970	Church of World Messianity; Faith healing	
Shinnyo-en	Shinjo Ito, Tomoji Ito	1936	Japanese; Japanese Buddhism	^{[Melton 2003]} ^{[Beit-Hallahmi 1992]}
Shinreikyo	Kanichi Otsuka	1950, circa	Japanese; Shinto; Syncretistic	^{[Melton 2003]} ^{[Beit-Hallahmi 1992]}
Shouters	Li Changshou	1965	Christianity	
Shri Ram Chandra Mission	Shri Ram Chandraji Maharaj	1945	Hindu	
Slavic Native Faith, a.k.a. Rodnovery or Slavic Neopaganism	Władysław Kołodziej, Jan Stachniuk	1920–30s	Modern Pagan; Polytheistic reconstructionism	
Slavic-Hill Rodnovery	Aleksandr Belov	1980s	Modern Pagan; Slavic Native Faith	
Soka Gakkai International	Tsunesaburo Makiguchi	1930	Japanese; Nichiren Buddhism	^{[Melton 2003]} ^{[Beit-Hallahmi 1992]}
Spiritualism	Kate and Margaret Fox	1848	Psychic-Mediumship; Metaphysical	^{[Miller 1995]}
Subud (Susila Budhi Dharma)	Muhammed Subuh	1933	Kejawèn neo-Sufism	^{[Clarke 2006]} ^{[Miller 1995]} ^{[Melton 2003]} ^{[Beit-Hallahmi 1992]}
Sufi Ruhaniat International	Samuel L. Lewis	1968	neo-Sufism	^{[Beit-Hallahmi 1997]} ^{[Beit-Hallahmi 1992]}
Sukyo Mahikari	Keishu Okada	1978	Japanese; Mahikari Syncretistic	^{[Beit-Hallahmi 1997]} ^{[Beit-Hallahmi 1992]}
Summum	Claude Rex Nowell	1975	Unclassified Christian	^{[Melton 2003]} ^{[Beit-Hallahmi 1992]}
Sun Dance		1890	Native American; Indigenist	
Syntheism	Alexander Bard	2012	Pantheist; Humanist; Netocratic	
Temple of Set	Michael A. Aquino	1975	Satanism; Polytheism	
Temple of the True Inner Light	Alan Birnbaum	1980	Psychedelic church Christian revisionism	
Tenrikyo	Miki Nakayama	1838	Japanese; Shinto	^{[Melton 2003]} ^{[Beit-Hallahmi 1992]}
Tensegrity	Carlos Castaneda	1995	Neoshamanism; New Age	^{[Clarke 2006]}
Terasem	Martine Rothblatt	2004	Transhumanism	
Thelema, a.k.a. the A∴A∴ order	Aleister Crowley	1900s, early	Occult neo-Hermetism; Western esotericism	
Theosophy or Theosophical Society, a.k.a. 1882 as Theosophical Society Adyar	Helena Petrovna Blavatsky, Henry Steel Olcott, William Quan Judge	1875	Occult; Eastern and Western esotericism	^{[Clarke 2006]} ^{[Miller 1995]}
Theosophical Society Pasadena	William Quan Judge	1895	Theosophical	^{[Miller 1995]}
Tolstoyan primitivism	Leo Tolstoy	1901	Christian anarchism Pacifism	
Toronto Blessing	Randy Clark	1994	Neo-charismatic	
Transcendental Meditation (TM)	Maharishi Mahesh Yogi	1958	Neo-Hindu-inspired	^{[Melton 2003]} ^{[Beit-Hallahmi 1992]}
Triratna Buddhist Community (formerly Friends of the Western Buddhist Order)	Sangharakshita (Dennis Lingwood)	1967	Neo-Buddhism	
True Buddha School	Lu Sheng-yen	1980s, late	Tibetan Buddhism; Taoism	
True Russian Orthodox Church	Pyotr Kuznetsov	2007	Russian Orthodoxy Apocalypticism	
Twelve Tribes	Gene and Marsha Spriggs	1972	Messianic Jewish Communal—After 1960	^{[Melton 2003]} ^{[Beit-Hallahmi 1992]}
Two by Twos, a.k.a. Cooneyites, Christian Conventions, the Workers and Friends, the Truth, etc.	William Irvine	1897	Independent fundamentalist family	^{[Melton 2003]} ^{[Beit-Hallahmi 1992]} ^{[Chryssides 2001]}
Umbanda	Zélio Fernandino de Moraes	1920	Spiritism	^{[Beit-Hallahmi 1992]}
Unarius Academy of Science	Ernest Norman, Ruth Norman	1954	UFO Religion	^{[Beit-Hallahmi 1992]}
União do Vegetal	Mestre Gabriel	1961	Spiritism; Neoshamanic; Entheogen groups	
Unification Church, a.k.a. the Moonies	Sun Myung Moon	1954	Syncretistic Christian	^{[Beit-Hallahmi 1997]} ^{[Beit-Hallahmi 1992]}
Unitarian Universalism	consolidation	1961	Unitarian Universalism	^{[Nichols, Mather & Schmidt 2006]} ^{[Chryssides 2006]}
United Holy Church of America	Isaac Cheshier	1900	Black Trinitarian Pentecostal	^{[Melton 2003]} ^{[Beit-Hallahmi 1992]}
United House of Prayer for All People	Marcelino Manoel de Graca	1925	African American Pentecostal	^{[Beit-Hallahmi 1997]} ^{[Beit-Hallahmi 1992]}
United Israel World Union	David Horowitz	1944	Other Jewish Groups	^{[Melton 2003]} ^{[Beit-Hallahmi 1992]}
United Lodge of Theosophists	Robert Crosbie	1909	Theosophical	^{[Melton 2003]} ^{[Beit-Hallahmi 1992]}
United Pentecostal Church International	merger	1945	Apostolic Pentecostals	^{[Melton 2003]} ^{[Beit-Hallahmi 1992]}
Unity Church	Charles Fillmore and Myrtle Fillmore	1889/1903	New Thought-Christian	^{[Beit-Hallahmi 1997]} ^{[Beit-Hallahmi 1992]}
Universal Church of the Kingdom of God	Edir Macedo	1977	Neo-charismatic; Evangelical	^{[Clarke 2006]}
Universal Great Brotherhood	Serge Raynaud de la Ferriere	1940s, late	Other Theosophical Groups	^{[Melton 2003]} ^{[Beit-Hallahmi 1992]}
Universal Life Church	Kirby Hensley	1962	Liberal Family	^{[Melton 2003]} ^{[Beit-Hallahmi 1992]}
Universal White Brotherhood	Peter Deunov	1900	Other Theosophical Groups; Esoteric Christianity	^{[Melton 2003]}
Urantia Foundation	William S. Sadler	1934	UFO religion Psychic; New Age; Christian occultist	^{[Nichols, Mather & Schmidt 2006]} ^{[Melton 2003]} ^{[Beit-Hallahmi 1997]}
Vajradhatu	Chögyam Trungpa	1973	Tibetan Buddhism	^{[Melton 2003]} ^{[Beit-Hallahmi 1992]}
Vale do Amanhecer	Tia Neiva	1959	Spiritualism	
Volunteers of America	Ballington Booth, Maud Booth	1896	Holiness	^{[Melton 2003]} ^{[Beit-Hallahmi 1992]}
Washat Dreamers Religion	Smohalla	1850	Native American; Indigenist	
The Way International	Victor Paul Wierwille	1942	Independent fundamentalist family	^{[Melton 2003]} ^{[Beit-Hallahmi 1992]}
The Way of the Livingness (Universal Medicine)	Serge Benhayon	1999	Neo-Theosophical and/or "Socially harmful cult".	
White Eagle Lodge	Lady Elizabeth Carey	1943	Other Theosophical Groups	^{[Melton 2003]} ^{[Beit-Hallahmi 1992]}
Wicca	Gerald Gardner	1949, circa	Pagan-influenced; Syncretic; New Age	^{[Nichols, Mather & Schmidt 2006]} ^{[Miller 1995]}
Wotansvolk	David Lane	1990s	neo-völkisch paganism	
The Word Foundation	Harold W. Percival	1904, circa	Theosophical	^{[Melton 2003]} ^{[Beit-Hallahmi 1992]}
World Peace and Unification Sanctuary Church	Hyung Jin Moon, Yeon Ah Lee Moon	2015	Unification Church-based ultra-Orthodox/Fundamentalism	
Yiguandao	Wang Jueyi; Chang Thien Ran	1800s, late	Chinese salvationist-Millenarian	^{[Clarke 2006]}

== See also ==
- Governmental lists of cults and sects
- Hinduism-oriented new religious movements
- List of Christian denominations
- List of New Thought denominations and independent centers
- List of Neopagan movements
- List of religions and spiritual traditions
- List of sects in the Latter Day Saint movement
- New religious movements in the United States
- Psychedelic Cults and Outlaw Churches
- Sociological classifications of religious movements

== Bibliography ==
=== Other selected sources ===
- Adler, Margot (2006) [1979]. Drawing Down the Moon: Witches, Druids, Goddess-Worshippers, and Other Pagans in America Today (Reprint rev. and expand. ed.). New York: Penguin/Arcana. ISBN 0-14-019536-X. | at Archive.org
- Ashcraft, W. Michael (2018). Introduction to the Study of New Religious Movements. London; New York: Routledge.
- Bainbridge, William Sims (1997). The sociology of religious movements. London; New York: Routledge. ISBN 978-0-415-91202-0.
- Barrett, David V. (2001). The new believers: a survey of sects, cults and alternative religions (Rev. ed.). London: Cassell. ISBN 978-0-304-35592-1.
- Best, Felton O., ed. (1998). Black Religious Leadership from the Slave Community to the Million Man March; flames of fire. Lewiston, New York: The Edwin Mellen Press.
- Burgess, Stanley M.; van der Maas, Eduard M., eds. (2002). The New International Dictionary of Pentecostal and Charismatic Movements. Grand Rapids: Zondervan. ISBN 0-310-22481-0.
- Champagne, Duane (2005). "North American Indian Religions: New Religious Movements". In Lindsay Jones (ed.). Encyclopedia of Religion: 15-volume Set. Vol. 10 (2nd ed.). Farmington Hills, Mi: Macmillan Reference USA – via Encyclopedia.com.
- Clarke, Peter B., ed. (2000). Japanese New Religions: In Global Perspective. Surrey, UK: Curzon Press. ISBN 0-7007-1185-6.
- Dawson, Andrew (2007). New Era, New Religions: Religious Transformation in Contemporary Brazil. Ashgate Publishing. ISBN 978-0-7546-5433-9.
- Dawson, Lorne L. (2006). Comprehending Cults: The Sociology of New Religious Movements. Don Mills, Ontario: Oxford University Press. ISBN 978-0-19-542009-8.
- Ellwood, Robert S. (1971). "Notes on a Neopagan Religious Group in America". History of Religions. XI (1): 125–139. doi:10.1086/462645. S2CID 162222699.
- Enroth, Ronald M. (2005). A Guide To New Religious Movements. InterVarsity Press. ISBN 978-0-8308-2381-9.
- Fort, Samuel (2014). Cult of the Great Eleven. Nisirtu Press. ASIN B00OALI9O4.
- Gallagher, Eugene V. (2006). Introduction to New and Alternative Religions in America. Westport, Conn: Greenwood Press. ISBN 978-0-275-98713-8.
- Gold, Lorna (2004). The Sharing Economy: Solidarity Networks Transforming Globalization. Ashgate Publishing. ISBN 978-0-7546-3345-7.
- Goodrick-Clarke, Nicholas (2002). Black Sun: Aryan Cults, Esoteric Nazism and the Politics of Identity. Albany, NY: SUNY Press. ISBN 978-0-8147-3155-0.
- Gooren, Henri, ed. (2015). Encyclopedia of Latin American Religions. Springer International Publishing. doi:10.1007/978-3-319-08956-0_49-1. ISBN 978-3-319-08956-0. S2CID 239249964.
- Greer, John Michael (2003). The New Encyclopedia of the Occult. St. Paul: Llewellyn Publications. ISBN 978-1-56718-336-8.
- Hanegraaff, Wouter (2013). Western Esotericism: A Guide for the Perplexed. London: Bloomsbury Press. ISBN 978-1-4411-3646-6.
- Hayes, Michael A. (2006). New Religious Movements in the Catholic Church. Continuum International Publishing Group. ISBN 978-0-8264-9357-6.
- Introvigne, Massimo; Kotkowska, Karolina Maria (2024). "The Ahmadi Religion of Peace and Light: An Introduction". The Journal of CESNUR. 8 (3): 33–51. doi:10.26338/tjoc.2024.8.3.2. ISSN 2532-2990.
- Irons, Edward A. (2008). Encyclopedia of Buddhism. Encyclopedia of World Religions. New York: Checkmark Books. ISBN 978-0-8160-7744-1.
- Jones, Lindsay, ed. (2005). Encyclopedia of Religion. Vol. 15-volume Set (2nd ed.). Detroit, Mi: MacMillan Reference USA. ISBN 0-02-865733-0.
- Keown, Damien; Prebish, Charles S. (2013). Encyclopedia of Buddhism. Routledge. ISBN 978-1-136-98588-1.
- Klass, Morton; Weisgrau, Maxine K. (1999). Across the Boundaries of Belief: Contemporary Issues in the Anthropology of Religion. Boulder, Co; Oxford, UK: Westview Press. ISBN 978-0-8133-2695-5.
- Krogh, Marilyn; Pillifant, Brooke Ashley (2004). "Kemetic Orthodoxy: Ancient Egyptian Religion on the Internet: A Research Note". Sociology of Religion. 65 (2): 167–175. doi:10.2307/3712405. JSTOR 3712405.
- "Mini-Consultation on Reaching Mystics and Cultists". Lausanne Occasional Paper. 11 (1.e). 1980. Archived from the original on 2010-02-11.
- Lewis, James R. (2002). Encyclopedia of Cults, Sects, and New Religions. Amherst, NY: Prometheus. ISBN 978-1-57392-888-5.
- Lewis, James R. (2003). The Encyclopedic Sourcebook of UFO Religions. Prometheus Books. ISBN 978-1-57392-964-6.
- Lewis, James R., ed. (2004). The Encyclopedic Sourcebook of New Age Religions. Prometheus Books. ISBN 978-1-59102-040-0.
- Lewis, James R., ed. (2004). The Oxford Handbook of New Religious Movements. New York: Oxford University Press. ISBN 0-19-514986-6.
- Lewis, James R.; Petersen, Jesper Aagaard, eds. (2004). Controversial New Religions (1st ed.). New York: Oxford University Press. ISBN 978-0-19-515682-9.
- Lewis, James R.; Tøllefsen, Inga Bårdsen, eds. (2015). Handbook of Nordic New Religions. Leiden: Brill. ISBN 978-90-04-29246-8.
- Lewis, James R.; Tøllefsen, Inga Bårdsen, eds. (2016) [2008]. The Oxford Handbook of New Religious Movements. Oxford Handbooks. Vol. 2 (2nd ed.). New York: Oxford University Press. ISBN 978-0-19-046617-6.
- Lyon, David (2000). Jesus in Disneyland: Religion in Postmodern Times. Polity. ISBN 978-0-7456-1489-2.
- Marhic, Renaud; Kerlidou, Alain (1996). Sectes & mouvements initiatiques en Bretagne: du celtisme au nouvel âge. Terre de brume editions. ISBN 978-2-908021-78-3.
- Mayer, Jean-François; Kranenborg, Reender (2004). La naissance des nouvelles religions (in French). Genève: Georg. ISBN 978-2-8257-0877-4. Archived from the original on 2011-07-18.
- Melton, J. Gordon, ed. (1990). New Age Encyclopedia. Detroit, Mi: Gale Research. ISBN 0-8103-7159-6.
- Melton, J. Gordon (1992) [1986]. Encyclopedic Handbook of Cults in America. Religious Information Series, 7 (Rev. and updated ed.). New York: Garland Publ. ISBN 0-8153-0502-8.
- Melton, J. Gordon (1999). Religious Leaders of America: A Biographical Guide to Founders and Leaders of Religious Bodies, Churches, and Spiritual Groups in North America (2nd ed.). Detroit, Mi: Gale Group. ISBN 0-8103-8878-2.
- Melton, J. Gordon; et al., eds. (2009) [1978]. Melton's Encyclopedia of American Religions (8th ed.). Detroit, MI: Gale Cengage Learning. ISBN 978-0-787-69696-2. (archive)
- Melton, J. Gordon; Baumann, Martin, eds. (2010). Religions of the world: a comprehensive encyclopedia of beliefs and practices (PDF). Vol. 1–6 (2nd ed.). Santa Barbara, Ca; Denver, Co; Oxford: ABC-Clio. ISBN 978-1-59884-203-6.
- Nelson, Geoffrey K. (1987). Cults, New Religions and Religious Creativity. London: Routledge & Kegan Paul. ISBN 978-0-7102-0855-2.
- Partridge, Christopher (2004). New Religions: A Guide: New Religious Movements, Sects and Alternative Spiritualities. New York: Oxford University Press. ISBN 978-0-19-522042-1.
- Partridge, Christopher Hugh (2003). UFO Religions. London: Routledge. ISBN 978-0-415-26324-5.
- Peters, Shawn Francis (2008). When Prayer Fails: Faith Healing, Children, and the Law. New York: Oxford University Press. ISBN 978-0-19-530635-4.
- Ramstedt, Martin (2007). Kemp, Daren; Lewis, James R. (eds.). Handbook of the New Age. Brill Handbooks on Contemporary Religion. Vol. 1. Leiden: Brill. ISBN 978-90-04-15355-4.
- Raphael, Melissa (April 1998). "Goddess Religion, Postmodern Jewish Feminism, and the Complexity of Alternative Religious Identities". Nova Religio. 1 (2): 198–215. doi:10.1525/nr.1998.1.2.198.
- Reece, Gregory L. (2007). UFO Religion: Inside Flying Saucer Cults and Culture. I. B. Tauris. ISBN 978-1-84511-451-0.
- Ryan, Charles J. (1975). H.P. Blavatsky and the Theosophical Movement. San Diego, Ca: Point Loma Publications. ISBN 0-913004-25-1.
- Saliba, John (2003). Understanding New Religious Movements. AltaMira Press. ISBN 978-0-7591-0356-6.
- Singer, Margaret Thaler; Lalich, Janja (1995). Cults in Our Midst. San Francisco, Ca: Jossey-Bass. ISBN 978-0-7879-0051-9.
- Smith, Christian; Joshua Prokopy (1999). Latin American Religion in Motion. London; New York: Routledge. ISBN 978-0-415-92106-0.
- Strmiska, M.; Sigurvinsson, B. A. (2005). "Asatru: Nordic Paganism in Iceland and America". In Strmiska, M. (ed.). Modern Paganism in World Cultures: Comparative Perspectives. Santa Barbara, Ca; Denver, Co; Oxford: ABC-Clio. ISBN 978-1-85109-608-4.
- Swenson, Donald (2009). Society, Spirituality, and the Sacred: A Social Scientific Introduction. North York, Ontario: University of Toronto Press. ISBN 978-0-8020-9680-7.
- Tamura, Yoshiro (2001). Japanese Buddhism: A Cultural History. Kosei Publishing Company. ISBN 978-4-333-01684-6.
- Tucker, Ruth A. (2004). Another Gospel: Cults, Alternative Religions, and the New Age Movement. Zondervan. ISBN 978-0-310-25937-4.
- Urban, Hugh B. (2015). New Age, Neopagan, and New Religious Movements: Alternative Spirituality in Contemporary America. Berkeley, Ca: University of California Press. ISBN 978-0-520-28117-2.
- York, Michael (2004). Historical Dictionary of New Age Movements. Lanham, Md: Scarecrow Press. ISBN 978-0-8108-4873-3.
