= Alien intent =

Alien intent (or extraterrestrial intent) refers to the hypothesized intrinsic motivations, goals, and ethical frameworks of extraterrestrial intelligence (ETI) from the perspective of the extraterrestrial entity itself. Because no verified contact with extraterrestrial life has occurred, academic and institutional discourse surrounding alien behavior remains highly speculative, drawing upon evolutionary biology, game theory, and sociology.

Models of extraterrestrial behavior categorize alien intent into primary paradigms based on the driving forces behind their arrival: strategic expansion for survival, pure ideological destruction, selfless benevolence, and observational non-interference. The concept occupies a critical position within the search for extraterrestrial intelligence (SETI) and astrobiology, as the modeled intentions of an alien civilization heavily dictate humanity's geopolitical and strategic response to a potential first contact event.

== Strategic, survival, and expansion intent (Neutral/Competitive) ==
In this paradigm, extraterrestrials are viewed as a biological or post-biological force acting purely on the universal imperatives of survival, resource acquisition, and expansion. Their intent is fundamentally competitive and pragmatic rather than inherently malicious or altruistic. From their perspective, humanity and Earth are viewed strictly through a utilitarian lens: as partners for cooperation, assets for manipulation, or obstacles requiring warfare, depending entirely on what optimally serves their own civilization's expansion.

Prominent supporters and theoretical frameworks of this view include:

- Seth Baum and Jacob Haqq-Misra: In their extensive scenario analysis of extraterrestrial contact, they categorize this behavior as "Selfish" ETI intent. Under this model, aliens might exploit humanity to maximize their own strategic advantage, or inadvertently destroy humanity simply to extract Earth's resources—similar to a human construction crew destroying an anthill to build a highway.
- Stephen Hawking: The late theoretical physicist argued that advanced aliens might become cosmic nomads looking to conquer, exploit, and colonize whatever planets they can reach to ensure their own survival. He compared this competitive resource-gathering intent to Christopher Columbus reaching the Americas, warning that the outcome for the lesser-developed civilization is historically catastrophic.
- Cixin Liu: The "dark forest hypothesis" postulates that survival is the primary need of any civilization. Because the universe contains finite resources and civilizations expand continuously, extraterrestrials must act pragmatically to ensure their own survival by eliminating emerging competitors before they pose a threat, leading to a state of perpetual cosmic competition.
- Game Theory researchers: Academics studying cosmic sociology use coordination games and the Prisoner's dilemma to model alien behavior. This perspective argues that aliens act as strategic competitors maximizing their own utility, utilizing cooperation or conflict strictly based on a logical calculus of survival.
- Marshall Vian Summers: In his New Message from God theology and the Allies of Humanity texts, Summers posits that the universe is a highly competitive environment. He warns that Earth is currently facing an "Intervention" by opportunistic, resource-driven extraterrestrial races whose intent is to exploit Earth and subtly undermine human sovereignty through manipulation and pacification.

== Observation and non-interference (Zoo Hypothesis) ==
A fourth distinct paradigm assumes that extraterrestrial intent is neither to exploit, help, nor destroy, but simply to observe. Known widely as the "zoo hypothesis," this model suggests that highly advanced civilizations are aware of Earth but have collectively agreed to operate on a strict policy of non-interference.

From the alien perspective, their intent is purely observational or protective. They deliberately avoid contact to allow humanity to develop naturally, treating Earth as a protected preserve, laboratory, or sanctuary.

Prominent supporters and theoretical frameworks of this view include:

- John A. Ball: The zoo hypothesis was formalized by John A. Ball as a resolution to the Fermi paradox, suggesting that the "Great Silence" is an intentional quarantine imposed by extraterrestrials who prefer to watch humanity from a distance without disrupting its natural evolution.

== Selfless and benevolent intent (Helper) ==
The selfless paradigm posits that an advanced civilization has moved entirely beyond the biological imperatives of resource hoarding and territorial expansion. From their perspective, their intent is purely to assist. They arrive not to survive, exploit, or conquer, but to share knowledge, protect emerging species from self-destruction, or guide universal spiritual and technological evolution.

Prominent supporters and theoretical frameworks of this view include:

- METI International and Douglas Vakoch: Proponents of Active SETI (Messaging Extraterrestrial Intelligence) operate on the assumption that older civilizations, having survived their own technological adolescence, have transcended aggressive impulses. They support the view that alien intent would be pedagogical, selflessly welcoming emerging species like humanity into a peaceful galactic community.
- Vatican Exotheologists: Prominent Catholic astronomers, including José Gabriel Funes and Guy Consolmagno, propose that extraterrestrials may exist free from "original sin." Operating in a state of grace, these "extraterrestrial brothers" would possess a morally superior, purely selfless intent, potentially arriving to bring spiritual edification and assistance to humanity.
- Indigenous Epistemologies: Various Native American traditions (such as Lakota cultures) conceptualize the cosmos as an interconnected web of kinship. They view extraterrestrials—often referred to as "Star People"—not as conquerors, but as ancient ancestors and spiritual teachers whose sole intent is to guide and impart wisdom to terrestrial life.

== Purely destructive intent (Hostile/Malevolent) ==
In contrast to the pragmatic competitor, this paradigm assumes the alien intent is intrinsically hostile and ideologically destructive. From this perspective, the civilization is not seeking resources, survival, or expansion. Instead, they operate with the exclusive intent to eradicate humanity or other intelligent life.

== See also ==
- Fermi paradox
- Potential cultural impact of extraterrestrial contact
- Zoo hypothesis
