= Zenor =

Zenor is a surname. Notable people with the surname include:

- Richard Zenor (1911–1978), American medium
- Susanne Zenor (born 1946), American actress
- William T. Zenor (1846–1916), American politician from Indiana
