= Varieties of Christianity =

Articles discussing varieties of Christianity:

- Christian denomination
- List of Christian denominations
- Christian movements
- Christian-oriented new religious movements
- Folk Christianity
- Christology
- Christian heresy
- Christian schisms
- National church

== See also ==
- History of Christianity
- Christianity and Gnosticism
