= Ausar =

Ausar may refer to:

- Osiris, an Egyptian god, usually identified as the god of the afterlife, the underworld and the dead.
- Ausar Thompson, a basketball player for the Detroit Pistons
- Serchio, the third longest river in the Italian region of Tuscany, known in antiquity as Auser.
- Ausar Auset Society, a Pan-African religious organization, with chapters all across the United States
- A brutal deathless warlord from the game Infinity Blade
