= Marshall Vian Summers =

American spiritual author

- Born: January 28, 1949 (age 77); Berkeley, California, U.S.
- Occupations: Religious leader, Author, Spiritual teacher, Prophet
- Spouse: Patricia Summers
- Children: Reed Summers
- Writing career
- Language: English
- Period: 1983–present
- Subjects: Spirituality, Exotheology, Prophecy, Extraterrestrial life, Destiny, Purpose in life, Relationship, Inner peace
- Notable work: Steps to Knowledge
- Notable awards: ForeWord Magazine's Spirituality Book of the Year; 1999 Steps to Knowledge: The Book of Inner Knowing; IBPA Benjamin Franklin Silver Medal Award for Spirituality; 1997 Wisdom from The Greater Community: Volume II, The Greater Community Book of Teachings
- Movement: Worldwide Community of the New Message from God
- Website: Marshall Vian Summers

Marshall Vian Summers (born January 28, 1949) is an American religious leader and spiritual teacher who offers retreats, online broadcasts and events in the United States and abroad. He is the author of numerous books and podcasts, and is the founder of The Society for the New Message, a religious nonprofit organization established in 1992 which supports and makes available his books and teachings. He is the central figure within a new religious movement with an emphasis on the implications of exotheology for human evolution. Summers and his followers designate themselves the Worldwide Community of the New Message from God. His books are the basis for their beliefs and guiding principles, which break down categorically into warnings of extreme change and outside threat; and gifts of spiritual blessing and preparation for living in a world in decline.

== Biography ==
Marshall Summers grew up in an Episcopal family without much emphasis on religion. After studying music and English at the University of California, Berkeley, he became a teacher of the blind and claimed he began to develop sensitivity to "inner guidance," or gut feeling of knowing, that would lead him to go into the wilderness of the American Southwest to experience an encounter with what he related to as an Angelic Presence that instructed him to record messages that have come to be referred to as divine revelation.

== Beliefs ==
A prolific writer, Summers publishes on several platforms, in print and online, a collection of writings organized in a series titled "The One Book." He asserts that these publications are transcriptions from thousands of hours of direct contact with "Unseen Ones," whom he portrays as an angelic presence assigned to watch over the Earth. The content of the material is regarded as a (or the) "New Message from God," which posits a time of impending dire crisis for humanity—on the threshold of emergence into a highly competitive Greater Community of intelligent life, yet socially dissolute and environmentally compromised.

Summers compares the situation of humanity as it anticipates contact with, and exploration of, its limits in the universe to that of native peoples wherever they are taken by surprise by explorers seeking resources in their land.

A Greater Darkness is in the world. It is unlike anything that humanity has ever faced before. Contact has begun, but it is Contact with a dark purpose. In addition, we are facing converging waves of great change—climate change, environmental deterioration, diminishing food and energy resources and the growing threat of conflict and war. My message has come from the Angels of the Creator who are urgently attempting to enable humanity to recognize this and to prepare for encountering these new realities with wisdom and sobriety. These are the greatest events in human history, but humanity is unprepared.

— Marshall Vian Summers

== Messenger from God ==
The New Message from God is at once both a set of teachings that claims divine authority and the new religious movement that promotes these teachings. It is entirely based on the work of Summers, who has granted himself elevated status as "the Messenger" on the basis of these teachings. Summers and his adherents represent that he is a prophet on the order of the Buddha, Jesus, and Muhammad, in receipt of an unworldly communication having salvific power for individuals and for the planet among others in a populated universe. Summers has recorded these communications on tape, the transcription approaching ten thousand pages. Key components of this communication include warnings of an incursion upon Earth called the Intervention, and pronouncements about the future involving global upheaval and interaction between the human race and extraterrestrials which, Summers claims, are from "the Greater Community."

In 1992, to support the promulgation of his message in print and via broadcast, Summers founded The Society for the Greater Community Way of Knowledge, trading as The Society for the New Message from God, a 501(c)(3) religious non-profit organization which is both publisher of Summers' books and recordings (under the imprint New Knowledge Library) and a religious order. Mr. Summers' son Reed assists him, especially in communications, finding an audience among those with these shared interests: "Full Disclosure of the ET phenomena, Divinely Connected Channelers, [Secret Space Program] experiencers, Energy Healers, SSP Con Men, Authors of Off-Planet Subjects, State Secret Whistleblowers, precious Starseeds and all of us who have difficulty finding like minded people who see huge changes on the Horizon [who are] awakening to the spiritual nature of Reality."

The New Message Sanctuary in Boulder, Colorado, USA, a gathering place for The Society, broadcasts services via the Internet and since 2012 has presented its materials on line, as part of a free school claiming 2902 students and 112 countries represented, a ready answer to criticism in regards to capitalizing off the Word of God. The use of a Kickstarter campaign for the launch of a book on cosmic themes (capitalizing on the 2017 eclipse over the U.S.) is notable as an example of the interplay among technology, popular science and belief in the twenty-first century.

== Recordings ==
Except for The Allies of Humanity, which Summers contends were transmitted from extraterrestrial beings present in the physical (and not extra-dimensional, yet in concordance with Mr. Summers' divine source), Summers asserts his writings come through his will, mind and tongue in collaboration with a divine source. The resulting voice is recorded by him, then transcribed and published.

The majority of the content of Summers' publications was purportedly composed in these collaborations, whether allegedly sourced from extraterrestrial entities in physical reality or angelic beings on a plane beyond the physical. These recordings are claimed to differ from Mr. Summers' normal manner of speaking, which supposedly validates their origin outside himself.

=== Publications ===
- Wisdom from The Greater Community, Vol. 1: How to Live With Certainty, Strength & Wisdom in an Emerging World (1990).
  ISBN 978-1-884238-11-6
- Wisdom from The Greater Community, Vol. 2: How to Find Purpose, Meaning & Direction in an Emerging World (1993).
  ISBN 978-1-884238-12-3
- Greater Community Spirituality: A New Revelation (1998). ISBN 978-1-884238-21-5
- Steps to Knowledge: The Book of Inner Knowing (1999). ISBN 978-1-884238-18-5
- The Allies of Humanity, Book 1: An Urgent Message About the Extraterrestrial Presence in the World Today (2001).
  ISBN 978-1-884238-44-4
- The Allies of Humanity, Book 2: Human Unity, Freedom & the Hidden Reality of Contact (2005). ISBN 978-1-884238-35-2
- The Great Waves of Change: Navigating the Difficult Times Ahead (2009). ISBN 978-1-884238-60-4; 2009 Finalist for ForeWord Magazine's Book of the Year: Body, Mind & Spirit
- The Allies of Humanity, Book 3: A Message to Earth (2012). ISBN 978-1-884238-38-3
- Life in the Universe (2012). ISBN 978-1884238499
- Secrets of Heaven (2013). ISBN 978-1-884238-16-1; 2013 Finalist for ForeWord Magazine's Book of the Year: Body, Mind & Spirit
- God Has Spoken Again (2015). ISBN 978-1-942293-00-2 [Volume 1, Book 1 of The New Message from God]
- The One God (2016). ISBN 978-1-942293-10-1 [Volume 1, Book 2 of The New Message from God]
- The New Messenger (2016). ISBN 978-1-942293-17-0 [Volume 1, Book 3 of The New Message from God]
- The Greater Community (2017). ISBN 978-1942293-40-8 [Volume 1, Book 4 of The New Message from God]
- The Power of Knowledge (2019). ISBN 978-1942293446 [Volume 1, Book 5 of The New Message from God]
- The Journey to a New Life (2019). ISBN 978-1942293422 [Volume 1, Book 6 of The New Message from God]
- The New World (2019). ISBN 978-1942293460 [Volume 1, Book 7 of The New Message from God]
- The Allies of Humanity, Book 4: Freedom in the Universe (2019). ISBN 978-1942293972
- The Pure Religion (2019). ISBN 978-1942293484
- Preparing for the Greater Community (2020). ISBN 978-1942293552
- Relationships and Higher Purpose
- Living the Way of Knowledge: Building the Foundation for Becoming a Man or Woman of Knowledge in an Emerging World
- Steps to Knowledge Continuation Training (1998) ISBN 978-1-884238-83-3 (available after attestation to having completed two cycles of the first level of training)

=== Translations ===
Portions of the New Message have been translated from English into 34 other languages including Afrikaans, Albanian, Arabic, Bangla, Bulgarian, Chinese, Croatian, Dutch, Finnish, French, German, Greek, Hebrew, Hungarian, Italian, Kiswahili, Korean, Persian, Polish, Portuguese, Romanian, Russian, Serbian, Spanish, Swedish, Turkish and Vietnamese.

- Steps to Knowledge has been translated into Spanish, French, Greek, Portuguese, Chinese, Japanese, Korean, Swedish, Danish, Italian, German, Bulgarian and Persian.
- The Allies of Humanity into French, Russian, Spanish, Swedish, German, Portuguese, Korean, Italian, Chinese, Polish, Dutch, Hungarian, Romanian, and Greek.

== See also ==
- New Message from God
- UFO religion
- List of new religious movements
- New religious movement
