= Agasha Temple of Wisdom =

Philosophical group

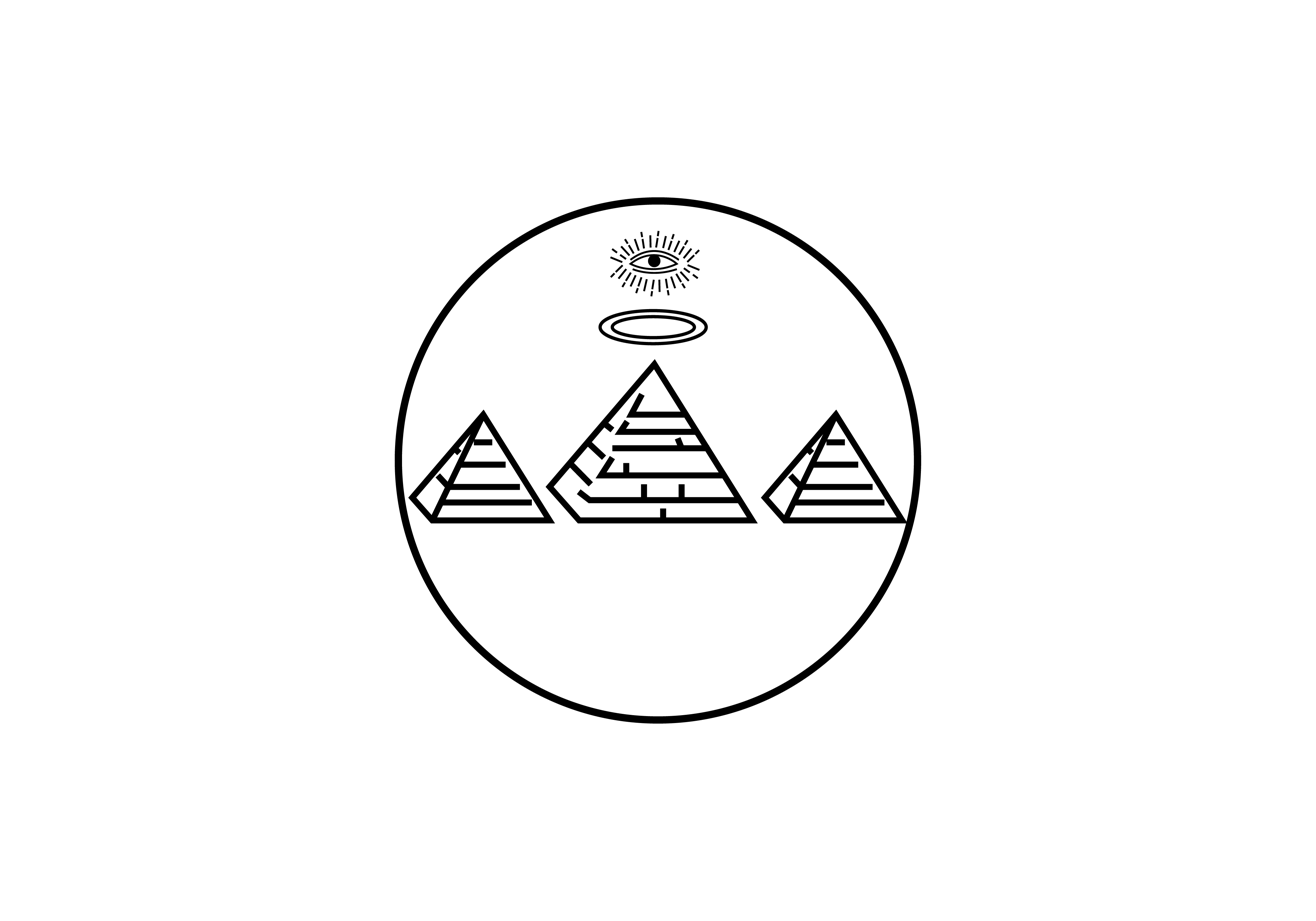
- Agasha Temple of Wisdom logo
- Formation: 1943
- Founder: Richard Zenor
- Type: Spiritual/philosophical organization ("Universal God Consciousness")
- Legal status: Active online
- Headquarters: Los Angeles, California
- Leader: Geary Salvat (1978–2002)
- Website: agasha.org

The Agasha Temple of Wisdom is an organization that teaches a philosophy of Universal God Consciousness. The organization was founded in 1943 in Los Angeles, California by Richard Zenor. After the publication of James Crenshaw's book Telephone Between Worlds in 1950, in which both Zenor and the temple were prominently featured, the temple became more popular. Upon Zenor's death in 1978, Geary Salvat was chosen to lead the organization. Reverend Geary Salvat died in 2002. The organization is currently active online.

== Sources ==
- Leslie Shepard (Editor) Encyclopedia of Occultism and Parapsychology Volume 1 A-L, The Gale Group, 2001 ISBN 978-0810385702
- J. Gordon Melton Religious Bodies in the U.S.: A Dictionary, Routledge, 1992 ISBN 978-0815308065 (although this is a listing only)
- LeRoy E. Froom, Professor of Historical Theology, Andrews University, Occult Forces of Both East and West, Ministry, International Journal for Pastors
- Gordon Collier Make Your Own World (3 volumes), Book of Destiny, 1955 (no ISBN)

== See also ==
- New religious movement
