= Silvia Meraz =

Mexican serial killer

- Born: Silvia Meraz Moreno; 1968 (age 57–58); Hermosillo, Sonora, Mexico
- Other name: The Human Sacrifices Sect of Nacozari
- Penalty: Life imprisonment

Details
- Victims: 3
- Span of crimes: 2009–2012
- Country: Mexico
- State: Sonora
- Date apprehended: March 2012

Silvia Meraz Moreno (born 1968) is a Mexican serial killer and cult leader who was convicted of three murders which took place between 2009 and 2012 in Nacozari, Sonora. Three people were murdered as human sacrifices to Santa Muerte.

== Background ==
Silvia Meraz was born in Hermosillo, Sonora. Her family lived in poverty in a poor neighborhood of Nacozari de García Municipality in Sonora. At age 16, she gave birth to her first son, Ramón Omar Palacios Meraz. She had three more children with her first husband, Martín Barrón López: Iván Martín, Francisca Magdalena and Georgina Guadalupe Barrón Meraz. She had her last daughter at age 29, named Silvia Yahaira, whose last name is not known.

At the time of the murders, Silvia was in a relationship with a man five years younger than her, Eduardo Sánchez Urrieta, who had a child from a previous relationship named Martín Ríos Sánchez-Urrieta.

== Crimes ==
At some point, Meraz became convinced that she could receive economic favors if she offered human sacrifices to Santa Muerte. Motivated by delirious ideas, she orchestrated the murders with the complicity of her family to win Santa Muerte's favor.

Meraz gained the following of eight members of her family, including four of her five children: Ramón Omar, Francisca Magdalena, Georgina Guadalupe and Silvia Yahaira, her father Cipriano Meraz, her partner Eduardo Sánchez and a woman named Zoyla Hada Santacruz Iriqui.

=== First murder ===
The first victim was Silvia Meraz's 55-year-old friend Cleotilde Romero Pacheco, who was found dead in December 2009. Cleotilde Romero was a local woman who sold popsicles. She had no close relatives.

Meraz later recounted that she had told Romero to pick up a 20-peso note off the ground, and when Romero bent down to pick it up, she struck her in the neck with an ax. She made an offering of the victim's blood in order to obtain protection on the part of Santa Muerte, and later burned and buried the decapitated corpse near the family home.

=== Second murder ===
The second victim was 10-year-old Martín Ríos Chaparro o Sánchez-Urieta, biological son of Eduardo Sánchez and adopted son of Silvia Meraz. He was murdered in June 2010. Meraz recalled that she had gotten the boy drunk and her youngest daughter—age 13 at the time—stabbed him at least 30 times. In a ritual held while he was still alive, his veins were cut and his blood was spread around an altar.

=== Third murder ===
The final victim was Jesús Octavio Martínez Yáñez, another 10-year-old boy. Martínez was the adopted son of Iván Martín Barrón Meraz, and therefore Meraz's grandson. He was murdered in July 2010. In this crime, Meraz held the boy in front of the altar while one of her daughters slaughtered him. A statement by prosecutors indicated that three children of the ages of five, two and one years old were involved in some way, in the very least witnessing the murder.

According to one of Zoyla Santacruz's daughters, Meraz had threatened to kill them if they did not commit the crimes. The children were beheaded in rituals.

== Investigation, arrest, and trial ==
The investigation began after Jesús Martínez was reported missing by his mother and her boyfriend. Investigators initially thought that the child could have been abducted by a human trafficking network due to alleged witness sightings of the boy near the Arizona border begging in the street. This hypothesis was ruled out. After two years of investigation, the Meraz family was implicated in the crime, as the body of Martínez was found under the floor of Meraz's youngest daughter's bedroom. The other two bodies were found in an unpopulated area northeast of Nacozari near Meraz's house. The state police discovered the bodies during an unrelated investigation. Silvia Meraz and the other seven involved (all Meraz relatives, including the husband of Silvia Meraz, her son, father of the last victim and a minor) were arrested in March 2012. Meraz received a prison sentence totaling 180 years. The rest of the cult members were sentenced to 60 years in prison, while the youngest daughter was sent to a youth detention center. According to psychological evaluations, the girl—who was 15 years old at the time of the murders and a member of the cult from an early age—appeared to consider such practices as normal.

== See also ==
- List of serial killers by country
