= Hindu reform movements =

Contemporary reform Hindu denominations

Contemporary groups, collectively termed Hindu reform movements, reform Hinduism, neo-Hinduism, or Hindu revivalism, strive to introduce regeneration and reform to Hinduism, both in a religious or spiritual and in a societal sense. The movements started appearing during the Bengali Renaissance.

== History ==
From the 18th century onward, India was colonised by the British. This process of colonisation had a huge impact on Indian society: social and religious leaders then integrated Western ideas with Hindu culture.

== Social reform movements ==
In social work, Swami Vivekananda, Dayananda Saraswati, Mahatma Gandhi, Vinoba Bhave, Baba Amte and Prabhat Ranjan Sarkar have been most important. Sunderlal Bahuguna created the chipko movement for the preservation of forestlands according to the Hindu ecological ideas. The less accessible Vedas were rejected and parallel Vachanas were compiled.

== Religious movements ==
=== Brahmo Samaj ===
The Brahmo Samaj is a social and religious movement founded in Kolkata in 1828 by Raja Ram Mohan Roy. The Brahmo Samaj movement thereafter resulted in the Brahmo religion in 1850 founded by Debendranath Tagore, better known as the father of Rabindranath Tagore.

==== Brahmo Samaj of South India ====
The faith and Principles of Brahmo Samaj had spread to South Indian states like Andhra Pradesh, Tamil Nadu, Karnataka, and Kerala with many followers.

In Kerala the faith and principles of Brahmo Samaj and Raja Ram Mohun Roy had been propagated by Ayyathan Gopalan, and reform activities had been led by establishing Brahmo Samaj in 1898 in the Calicut (now Kozhikode) region. Gopalan was a doctor by profession, but dedicated his life to Brahmo Samaj, and was an active executive member of the Calcutta Sadharan Brahmo Samaj until his death.

=== Arya Samaj ===
The Arya Samaj is a monotheistic Hindu reform movement founded in India by Maharshi Dayananda, an ascetic who believed in the infallible authority of the Vedas.

It aimed to be a universal structure based on the authority of the Vedas. Dayananda stated that he wanted 'to make the world noble', i.e., to return Hinduism to its universality of the Vedas. To this end, the Arya Samaj started Shuddhi movement in early 20th century to bring back Hinduism to people converted to Islam and Christianity, set up schools and missionary organisations, and extended its activities outside India. Jawaharlal Nehru, the first prime minister of India in his book, The Discovery of India credits Arya Samaj in introducing proselytisation in Hinduism.

=== Ramakrishna Movement ===
Swami Vivekananda was a central personality in the development of another stream of Hinduism in late 19th century and the early 20th century that reconciled the devotional (bhakti-mārga) path of his guru Sri Ramakrishna (of the Puri dashanami sampradāya) with the gnana mārga (path of knowledge). His ideals and sayings have inspired numerous Indians as well as non-Indians, Hindus as well as non-Hindus. Among the prominent figures whose ideals were very much influenced by them were Rabindranath Tagore, Gandhi, Subhas Bose, Satyendranath Bose, Megh Nad Saha, Sister Nivedita, and Sri Aurobindo.

== See also ==
- Ayathan Gopalan
- Bengal Renaissance
- Contemporary Sant Mat movements
- List of Hindu organisations
- Hinduism in the West
- Hindu Widows' Remarriage Act, 1856
- New religious movement

== Sources ==
- Bose, Ram Chandra (1884). Brahmoism; or, History of reformed Hinduism from its origin in 1830. Funk & Wagnalls. OCLC 1032604831.
- Beckerlegge, Gwilym (2006). "Neo-Hinduism". In Clarke, Peter B. (ed.). Encyclopedia of New Religious Movements. London; New York: Routledge. pp. 435–436. ISBN 9-78-0-415-26707-6.
- Dense, Christian D. Von (1999), Philosophers and Religious Leaders, Greenwood Publishing Group
- Farquhar, John Nicol (1915). Modern religious movements in India. Robarts — University of Toronto. New York: Macmillan.
- Jones, Constance A.; Ryan, James D. (2007). Encyclopedia of Hinduism. Encyclopedia of World Religions. J. Gordon Melton, Series Editor. New York: Facts On File. ISBN 978-0-8160-5458-9. Archived from the original on 2 April 2020.
- Jones, Kenneth W. (1990). "Socio-Religious Reform Movements in British India". The New Cambridge History of India. Cambridge University Press. pp. 36–53. ISBN 0-521-24986-4.
- Killingley, Dermot (2019). "Rammohun Roy and the Bengal Renaissance". The Oxford History of Hinduism: Modern Hinduism. New York: Oxford University Press. pp. 36–53. doi:10.1093/oso/9780198790839.003.0003. ISBN 9780198790839.
- Michaels, Axel (2004), Hinduism. Past and present, Princeton, New Jersey: Princeton University Press
- Mukerji, Mādhava Bithika (1983), Neo-Vedanta and Modernity, Ashutosh Prakashan Sansthan
- Renard, Philip (2010), Non-Dualisme. De directe bevrijdingsweg, Cothen: Uitgeverij Juwelenschip
- J. Zavos, Defending Hindu Tradition: Sanatana Dharma as a Symbol of Orthodoxy in Colonial India, Religion (Academic Press), Volume 31, Number 2, April 2001, pp. 109–123.
- Ghanshyam Shah, Social Movements in India: A Review of the Literature, New Delhi, Sage India, 2nd ed. (2004) ISBN 0-7619-9833-0
