= Sekta Niebo =

Christian new religious movement

The Sekta Niebo (Heaven Sect) (Polish Zbór Chrześcijański Leczenia Duchem Bożym; "Christian Church of Healing by Spirit of God") was a small religious movement founded in 1990 by faith healer Bogdan Kacmajor, who believed he was a prophet chosen by God and a reincarnation of the prophet Elijah.

== Beliefs and practices ==
Members of the sect believed that by the year 2000 the world would come to an end. Their goal was to establish a commune of chosen people. As a symbol of their new life they took new names and destroyed their identity documents. Total submission to Kacmajor was required. Members married each other, refused to send children to public school (as Kacmajor stated, "in chemistry class they teach that you can't turn water into wine, in physics class they teach that you can't walk on water") and refused to take any medical treatment (Kacmajor was convinced that he could even cure AIDS). Niebo gathered approximately 50 members.

== Decline ==
Because of their total social alienation the group soon started to have troubles with the law. Reports of kidnapping and children being kept prisoner started circulating. The Catholic Church and several church-related movements started a campaign against the community which resulted in bad fame and financial problems. As of 2008 the community does not exist and there are several court cases against Kacmajor.
