= Universal Great Brotherhood =

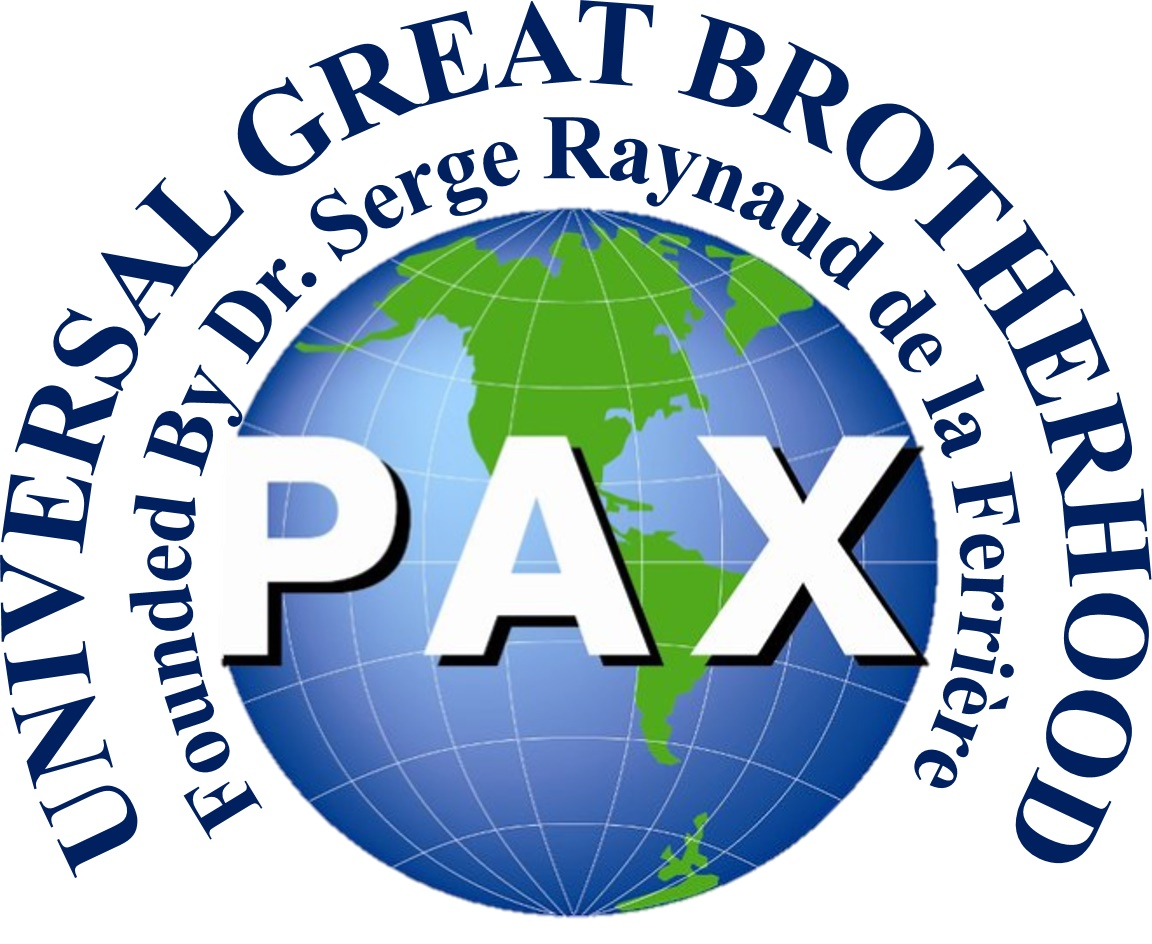
Universal Great Brotherhood Foundación Dr. Serge Raynaud de la Ferrière

The Universal Brotherhood is a cultural, non governmental, non religious, non profit, sectarian organization. This organization was founded in Caracas, Venezuela by Serge Raynaud de la Ferriere and registered with the United Nations DPI (Department of Public Informatiyon) in 1949 in Algiers, Africa. The Universal Brotherhood was given special accreditation for 2000 by the NGO branch of the United Nations Department of Economic and Social Affairs. According to that department, special consultative status is granted to NGOs which have a special competence in, and are concerned specifically with, only a few of the fields of activity covered by the ECOSOC.

Among the many goals and aims of the Universal Brotherhood is the establishment of Tolerance, Truth, and Peace, while recognizing that the truth is not something exclusive but that every path, religion, philosophy, culture has a part of the truth. Its objective is to bring together pseudoscience, art and religion, for the purpose of intellectual indoctrination as well as spiritual education.

The Universal Brotherhood's goal is to unite people who wish to work towards the transcendence of the spirit, regardless of belief, nationality, gender and economic status. This organization is sectarian and gives classes, lectures, and workshops regarding all the different paths, religions, philosophies and cultures impartially with preference towards none The term 'Universal Brotherhood' also refers to the oneness of the whole world, and its aim is to reduce wars and discrimination against selective people such as labourers.

== Activities ==
The principal activities of Universal Brotherhood are community service such as workshops on good nutrition, yoga for good health, meditation for relaxation, activities for children and adolescents, and women's clubs.

== Further references ==
- Alcalde. C. L. Movimientos Religiosos Libres. Lima; Concynet, 1988
- Álvarez, A. El Maestre – Cronobiografia. México, D.F; 1988
- Beskow, Manita. Sacred Spaces: The Journey of a disciple tracing the footsteps of her Spiritual Teacher. Perth, Australia, 2012
- González, O. La Aurora de Una Nueva Era. Ed. GFU, Caracas; 1972
- Raynaud, L.B. de. Los Falsos Maestros, Mi Vida con SRF. Caracas: Editores Individuales, 1991; ISBN 978-980-07-0352-6. This book was written by his wife and can be downloaded for free at a website which Wiki has unfortunately blocked. So just type: Serge Raynaud de la Ferriere in google and find the site where there is a zip file to download.
- Morera, Rosibel. El Cristo de Acuarius: Las Claves que lo Confirman.Costa Rica. 2009≈
- Siegel, P.: Serge Raynaud de la Ferrière: aspectos biográficos.São Paulo.2014.
- Lewis, James R., ed. (1998). "Universal Great Brotherhood". The Encyclopedia of Cults, Sects, and New Religions. Prometheus Books. p. 510. ISBN 978-1-61592-738-8.
