= Love Family =

Defunct Christian commune in Seattle

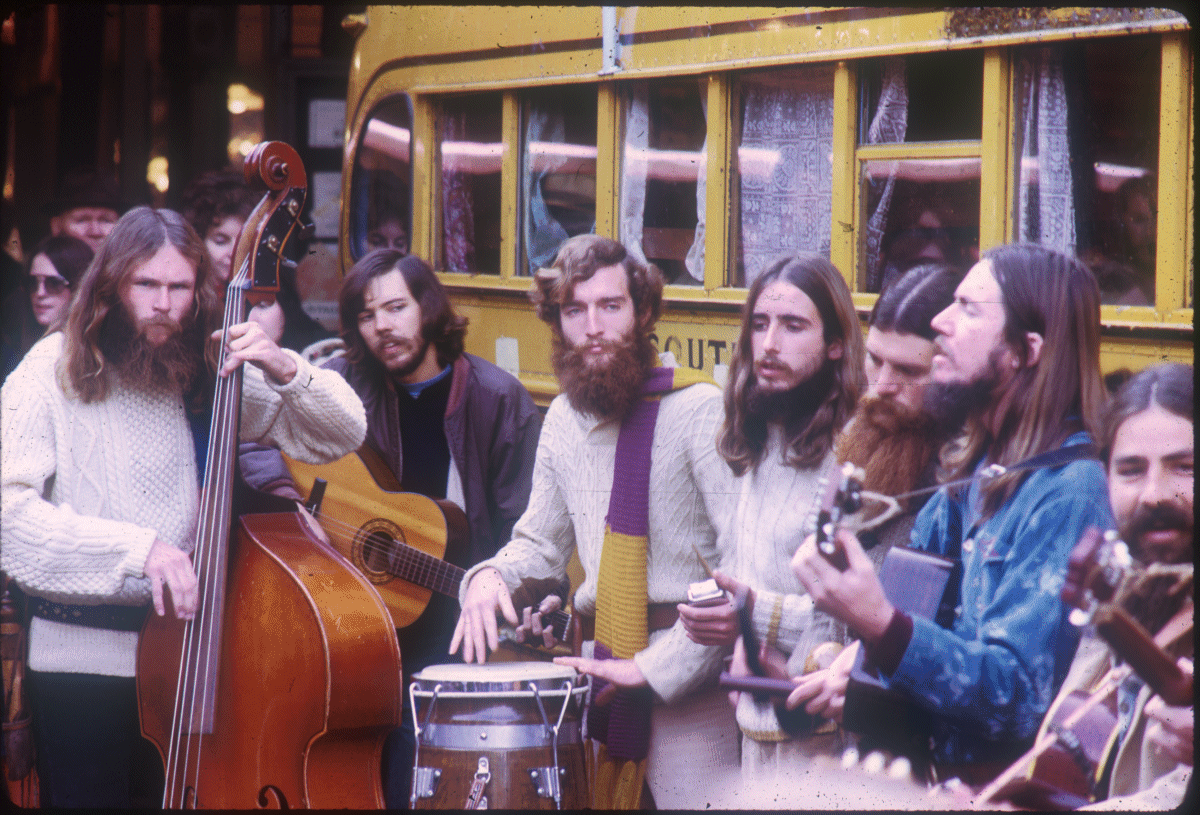
- Members of the Love Family perform at the 65th Anniversary Celebration of Pike Place Market, 1972. From left to right, Strength Israel, Zeal Israel, Courage Israel, Reality Israel, Integrity Israel, and Encouragement Israel.

Founder
- Paul Erdmann aka Love Israel

Regions with significant populations
- United States

Religions
- Christianity

The Love Family, or the Church of Jesus Christ at Armageddon, was a U.S. communal religious movement formed in 1968 and led by Paul Erdmann, who renamed himself Love Israel.

After a fractious conflict in 1984, the community was reduced to a small fraction residing on their 300-acre (1.2 km^{2}) property in Arlington, Washington. The Love Family flourished on that acreage from 1984 until 2004, when they were forced to sell the properties due to bankruptcy.

== Beliefs and practices ==
The group practiced meditation (often with the use of hallucinogenics) and believed that life was eternal and all people were one. Because life was 'eternal', the group did not observe birthdays or perform marriages. They placed personal revelation above traditional doctrine. The group was committed to living in the present – "Now is the time" was one of their mottoes – to the point that they avoided making appointments or incurring debt.

Additional prohibitions including smoking, owning clocks, mirrors, or watches, and reading books or magazines other than the Bible. The group did not use driver's licenses.

The group ate a predominantly vegetarian diet that they sustained in part through gardening and gleaning.

"Love Israel" is a play on one of the fundamental affirmations of the group, "Love is real". Equally important to the remaining members are three other commonly used affirmations: "We are one", "Love is the answer", and "Now is the time". These three 'fundamental belief' statements were used to stave off deeper curiosity and invoke a deeper discussion into the role of humanity on this earth.

=== Relationships ===
The community practised group marriage, although Love Israel was the only husband. Unauthorized sexual relationships were not allowed, nor was birth control.

=== Women ===
The group supposedly "eliminated the need for women's liberation by being righteous with each other". Women were expected to do housekeeping and cooking, serving the men first at meals. They were supposed to bow when entering a room occupied by a man and were not allowed to speak unless spoken to.

=== Children ===
Children were raised communally with strict discipline.

== History ==
Paul Erdmann, a former television salesman from California, moved to Seattle in 1968. The Love Family began in October 1968 as a communal household on Queen Anne Hill, Seattle, with their charter being written in 1971. Shortly after its founding, Erdmann renamed himself Love Israel; many of his followers adopted the "Israel" surname and biblical or virtue first names.

Within the first ten years, the community expanded to a network of about twelve communal homes and businesses. As more people arrived and settled in the surrounding neighborhood, Erdmann, as the leader, continued to inherit land and homes (primarily from those who joined) in other, more rural areas of Washington, Alaska, and Hawaii.

In 1972, two members of the family died after ritually breathing toluene fumes out of a plastic bag.

In 1974, plenty of Love Israel Family members danced and sang on stage at the World’s Fair in Spokane, Washington.

By 1979, the group had about 300 members.

In 1983, a conflict emerged within the family, led by members such as Logic Israel (Brian Allen), one of the principal elders in the family. This culminated in 1984, when the family returned $1.6 million and 14 Seattle properties to former member Daniel Gruener (Richness Israel) as part of an out-of-court settlement. Membership dwindled from 500 to 100 as the group was forced to give back assets and money to disenchanted members.

After the conflict, about 40 remaining members moved to properties in Arlington, and around 30 moved to Los Angeles. The Arlington commune supported both a local organic restaurant and an annual festival open to the public called the Garlic Festival, which drew crowds to the property.

In early 2004, the family sold their Arlington properties to the Union for Reform Judaism due to bankruptcy. In 2007, the former Arlington family grounds became Camp Kalsman, a Jewish summer camp. The remaining members moved to China Bend, a property along the Columbia River, in April 2004, and later to a property in Bothell, Washington.

Love Israel died in February 2016, less than a month after it was reported he was diagnosed with cancer. Daniel Gruener died in 2019.

== Current status ==
The small remaining core of Erdmann's community continues to this day.

The Love Family evolved from being a highly concentrated communal society with a shared economy to what some non-members call a cult with their own laws and ways. The greater community became a social network of autonomous households that interacted through a shared culture they have continued to create together, without the robes and peer-enforced order. Presently, those that continue to claim membership in what remains of the Family are concentrated in homes and lots on the shore of the Columbia River (Lake Roosevelt), where they own the China Bend Winery, just south of Canada.

Remaining family members still maintain they were called together to help each other "cultivate" love, oneness, and the presence of God in everyday family life. Very little is spoken about the continuing belief that Love Israel is a leader directed through his vision from God. They also believe that their gathering has Biblical roots and that their purpose is to help fulfill directed prophecies to benefit man and the promises of Jesus.

The current members still claim to view themselves as both the spiritual tribe of Israel and the Church of Jesus Christ at Armageddon, where Armageddon means the time and place of the gathering of God's family. A few family members continue to be renamed (and newborns named) to remind all that each person's character is gifted with a predominant attribute such as Charity, Honor, Honesty, or Contentment that may already be who they are or part of where they need to be.

== In media ==
A film It Takes A Cult, about the Love Israel Family (directed by Eric Johannsen, who grew up as part of the Love Family), was shown at the 2009 Seattle International Film Festival.

Rachel Israel, who spent 8 years of her childhood as part of the family, published a memoir on her experiences in 2018, called Counterculture Crossover: Growing up in the Love Family.

The podcast Family Ghosts has 3 episodes (Season 2, Episodes 1-3) produced by a woman who grew up in the Love Family talking about the group.
