= Serge Raynaud de la Ferriere =

French astrologer (1916–1962)

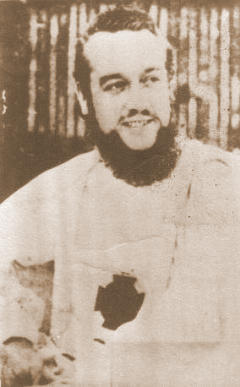
Holiness mining engineer, professor of biological sciences, doctor of theology: "Serge Raynaud de la Ferrière"

Serge Raynaud de la Ferrière (18 January 1916 – 27 December 1962) was a French Initiatic philosopher.

He was born in Paris, France, the son of Georges Constantine Louis Raynaud, who was an engineer, and Virginie Marie Billet. His parents moved to Brussels, Belgium when he was two years old, and his mother died there when he was only five years of age. He studied at several schools, and attended the Université Catholique de Louvain where he graduated as a mining engineer in the footsteps of his father and grandfather. Although he grew up and studied in Belgium he would return to his native France in his early twenties. [he returned to France when he was released from the army, in 1940. This data is registered in the military files. In 1941, he met Louise Baudin to whom he was married in 1944, and with whom he travelled to America, in 1947].

He founded the original Universal Great Brotherhood in 1948 in Caracas, Venezuela.

== Life and education ==
At an early age, de la Ferriere investigated man's relationship with the universe, ancient cultures, linguistics, philosophy, medicine, theology, parapsychology, esoterism and metaphysical studies.

During World War II, Dr. de la Ferriere returned to France worked as a psychologist and began his research into the sciences of astronomy and astrology.

Serge Raynaud de la Ferrière presented a list of initiatic and academic titles and degrees to his disciples.

== Universal Great Brotherhood ==
As Yoga continued to persist as the central point of his interest, Serge, without discarding his responsibilities, public activities, or scientific investigations, slowly began to partake in various initiations within the science and ancient tradition of the Great Rishis and Yogis of India and Tibet.

During 1944-1947 he composed various scientific organizations and held many conferences where he expounded upon his theories.

In 1946, as President of the International Federation of Scientific Societies, he asked the French Government to financially sponsor a research expedition to study the ancient civilizations of South America; his request was denied.

On November 12, 1947, Dr. Serge left Europe and traveled to the American Continent. He arrived at New York City and established the first center for the Universal Great Brotherhood. The Universal Great Brotherhood was created as a non-sectarian, and non-religious establishment, and all philosophies, religions, and cultures are studied with impartiality and preference is held towards none.

After passing through Guatemala, he arrived in Caracas, Venezuela, on January 17, 1948 with the goal of establishing it the headquarters of the institution. Once the center for the Universal Great Brotherhood in Caracas was well established, Dr. Serge found a beautiful spot in El Limón, Maracay, in the State of Aragua, Venezuela where he decided to construct an Ashram. Here he gratuitously offered an education to the public which encompassed the study and practice of ancient traditional teachings with the purpose of spiritual, artistic, and mental development. He also established an Initiatic College, Esoteric Center, and Study Center free of charge, as well as a Meditation Center, and Yoga Institute together with Jose Manuel Estrada, co-founder.

In Venezuela Serge met his first and most notable disciples and descendant masters: Jose Manuel Estrada, Juan Victor Mejias and Gil Colmenares ("Elder Brothers"). It is primarily these three disciples who are responsible for establishing the basic principles and structures of the Universal Great Brotherhood, which is a public institution, and the Supreme Order of Aquarius, which is the internal esoteric group that contains several streams and approaches to the establishment of these principles.

In 1949, after a stay of 17 months in Venezuela, he traveled to New York to preside over the International Peace Conference held in the month of June. [In New York, he separated from his wife and was taken to court by her, but they never actually got divorced]. From there he departed to Asia through Brussels and France.

He established a center for the Universal Great Brotherhood in Algiers, Africa and registered the Universal Great Brotherhood, Dr. Serge Raynaud de la Ferrière Foundation with the United Nations DPI (Department of Public Information) in 1949 and met his disciple David Juan Ferriz Olivares after that by letters.

The Universal Great Brotherhood is a member of the United Nations ECOSCOC (Economic and Social Council) and has Consultative Status as of the year 2000.

== Pilgrimage ==
On April 13, 1950, at Haridwar, India, he attended the Kumbha Mela pilgrimage.

He visited Tibet and may have visited the foothills of Mount Kailas.

After his visit to the Himalayas, he traveled through Burma, Siam, and other countries of the Far East before arriving in Australia.

== Death ==
Upon returning to Europe he stopped dressing in white, settling down in Nice, France. He began to write The Psychological Proposals, Volumes 1 through 36, with the help of this secretary and partner, Catherine Cucchietti and his 61 circular letters. By this time he had already written the books : The Great Messages, Yug, Yoga Yoghism, Art in The New Age, and The Black Book Of Freemasonry, with black signifying the color of gunpowder. He died in Nice.
