= American Buddhist Society and Fellowship, Inc. =

Organisation founded in 1945

The American Buddhist Society and Fellowship, Inc. is a Buddhist organization founded by Robert Ernst Dickhoff in 1945 and incorporated in 1947. The organization has one location in New York City. The organizations main tenet was the conscientious objection to medical care and the belief that insurances were equivalent to gambling and therefore counter posed to the healing nature of positive energy. Their belief was that a wager or insurance on sickness or death would only put negative karma into the universe and lead to more suffering.
