= Harold W. Percival =

Barbados-born author (1868–1953)

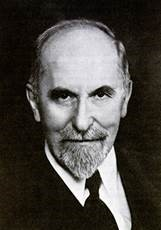
- Born: Harold Waldwin Percival; April 15, 1868; Bridgetown, Barbados, British West Indies
- Died: March 6, 1953 (aged 84); New York City, U.S.
- Occupations: Philosopher and writer
- Writing career
- Language: English
- Notable works: Thinking and Destiny, Man and Woman and Child, Masonry and Its Symbols, Democracy Is Self-Government

Harold Waldwin Percival (April 15, 1868 – March 6, 1953) was a philosopher and writer, best known for Thinking and Destiny, in print since 1946. Between 1904 and 1917, he published The Word. In 1950, he founded The Word Foundation, Inc. to keep Thinking and Destiny and all of his other works in print.

== Biography ==
Harold Waldwin Percival was born in 1868 in Bridgetown, Barbados, British West Indies, to parents of English descent. When his father died his mother moved to the United States, eventually settling in New York City.

Even as a young boy, Harold Percival was a seeker of truth. He was convinced that there were "wise ones" who could answer his many questions and impart knowledge. As a young man, one of his first experiences on his quest for knowledge came in 1892 when he joined the Theosophical Society. He would later help to organize the Theosophical Society Independent of New York and for many years serve as its president while also writing and lecturing.

In 1893, and twice during the next 14 years, Percival had the unique experience of being "conscious of Consciousness," a potent spiritual and noetic enlightenment. He stated that the value of that experience was that it enabled him to know about any subject by a process he called "real thinking." Because these experiences revealed to him more than was contained in Theosophy, he wanted to share this knowledge with humanity.

In 1902, Percival started to develop his own system. For over 30 years he worked on the manuscript that would lead to the writing of his magnum opus, Thinking and Destiny, now more than 65 years in print. He subsequently published three books expanding upon topics in the light of his system: Man and Woman and Child (1951), Masonry and Its Symbols (1952 ) and Democracy Is Self-Government (1952).

Between 1904 and 1917, Mr. Percival published The Word, a magazine with a worldwide circulation dedicated to the brotherhood of humanity. Percival's own articles earned him a place in Who's Who in America (1928–29).

In 1950, The Word Foundation, Inc., a non-profit organization, was established for the purpose of making known to the people of the world the writings of Harold W. Percival.

== Influence ==
Percival's works were noted as a major influence on Richard Matheson, the science-fiction author. He said that his book The Path (1998) was based largely on Thinking and Destiny.

In the book, The Bhagavad Gita: The Song of the Exalted Self, 1999, by Owen Slight, the author states that Harold W. Percival's Thinking and Destiny, like the Bhagavad Gita, reveals relevant, instructive and long lasting lessons regarding the higher self and the human plight—long lost lessons of everlasting truth contained both in the Sanskrit Bhagavad Gita and Thinking and Destiny. Both books contain complete systems of knowledge. The plight of Arjuna is shown by Percival to be our own.

== Works ==
=== Books ===
- Thinking and Destiny
- Man and Woman and Child
- Democracy is Self-Government
- Masonry and its Symbols

=== Editorials ===
Percival wrote the following editorials for The Word between 1904 and 1917:

- "Adepts, Masters and Mahatmas"
- "Atmospheres"
- "Birth-Death—Death-Birth"
- "Breath"
- "Brotherhood"
- "Christ"
- "Christmas Light"
- "Consciousness"
- "Consciousness Through Knowledge"
- "Cycles"
- "Desire"
- "Doubt"
- "Flying"
- "Food"
- "Form"
- "Friendship"
- "Glamour"
- "Ghosts"
- "Heaven"
- "Hell"
- "Hope & Fear"
- "Imagination"
- "Individuality"
- "I In the Senses"
- "Intoxications"
- "Karma"
- "Life"
- "Living / Living Forever"
- "Mirrors"
- "Motion"
- "Our Message"
- "Personality"
- "Psychic Tendencies and Development"
- "Sex"
- "Shadows"
- "Sleep"
- "Soul"
- "Substance"
- "Thought"
- "Veil of Isis, The"
- "Will"
- "Wishing"
- "Zodiac, The"

== Sources ==
- Melton, J. Gordon, ed. (2001), Gale Encyclopedia of Occultism & Parapsychology, Fifth Edition, Volume 2, Gale Group, ISBN 0810394898
