= Bethel Ministerial Association =

Organization of Christian ministers

The Bethel Ministerial Association is an organization of Christian ministers. It was founded in 1934 by Reverend Albert Franklin Varnell as a way to allow Christian ministers of similar doctrine to come together. Membership in the association is open to ministers only. The Association is nontrinitarian. They believe that there is only one God, who manifests himself as the Father, Son, and Holy Spirit. The association accepts the Bible as the Word of God, and practices immersion baptism in the name of Jesus.

The churches with which the individual members are associated are all independent of the Association and self-governing. The Association maintains a publishing arm in Evansville, Indiana, Bethel Publishing House, whose publications include the periodical Bethel Link, the Doctrinal Manual, "It Does Make a Difference What You Believe", the association's website bmaministries.com and other works.

The Association maintains a missionary program supporting over 50 missions worldwide. It also maintains a youth camp in southern Indiana called the Circle J Ranch, which ministers to over 300 young people for two weeks in the summer each year, and the Bethel Ministerial Academy.

The BMA is registered in Indiana although its member churches come from Indiana, Illinois, Kentucky, Georgia, Florida and other mostly Midwest churches. BMA is organized with a board of directors. The current chairman is Senior Pastor Donald E. Horath of Hillside Bethel Tabernacle in Decatur, Illinois.
