= Church of Light =

American new religious movement

The official emblem of the Church of Light

The Church of Light was incorporated November 2, 1932 in Los Angeles, California. Its mission is “to teach, practice, and disseminate The Religion of The Stars, a way of life for the Aquarian Age, as set forth in writings of C. C. Zain.” The Church is the continuation of an earlier initiatic organization, the Brotherhood of Light, established in the same city in 1915. The 1932 reorganization as The Church of Light was a response to ordinances passed that year by Los Angeles County “prohibiting both the teaching and practice of astrology.”

== Brotherhood of Light ==
The Church is the continuation of an initiatic organization, the Brotherhood of Light, established also in Los Angeles in 1915. The Brotherhood of Light lessons, on the three branches of occult science, were written between the spring of 1910 and 1950 by Elbert Benjamine (also known as C. C. Zain, born Benjamin Parker Williams). Benjamine had been invited in 1909 by the leaders of the Hermetic Brotherhood of Luxor (HBofL) in Denver to join them as successor to Minnie Higgin, who had been the order’s astrologer until her death that year. The surviving Council members proposed to Benjamine that he rewrite the order’s teachings in a systematic form as the basis for a new organization that would “bring occultism to the life of ordinary people.” This change was inspired by orders from Max Theon to close the Hermetic Brotherhood of Luxor following the death of his wife the previous year. After five years of preparation and study, Elbert Benjamine came to Los Angeles in 1915 and began to hold meetings. “At that point it still operated as a secret society. On November 11, 1918, the Brotherhood of Light opened its doors to the public, offering classes and a home-study course.”

=== Influences ===
Astro-Philosophical Publications, founded in Denver in 1892, was a publishing arm of the Hermetic Brotherhood of Luxor created by Henry and Belle Wagner. The authors it published included Thomas H. Burgoyne and Sarah Stanley Grimke, both cited by Benjamine as sources of Brotherhood teachings. He accorded the same status to Ghost Land and Art Magic by Emma Hardinge Britten. Another early HBofL member, Genevieve Stebbins, relocated to California from England in 1917 with her husband Norman Astley, and provided assistance to the Benjamines in establishing the Brotherhood of Light.

== Founders ==
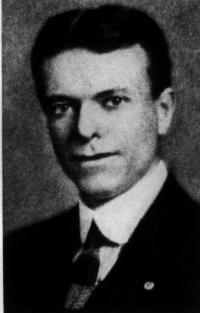
Elbert Benjamine

The 1932 reorganization as The Church of Light was a response to ordinances passed that year by Los Angeles County “prohibiting both the teaching and practice of astrology.” The three founding officers were:

- C. C. Zain, pen name of Elbert Benjamine (1882–1951) – president
- Fred Skinner (1872–1940) – vice president
- Elizabeth D. Benjamine (1875–1942) – secretary-treasurer

== Schisms ==
Following the 1943 remarriage of Elbert Benjamine, his son and heir apparent Will Benjamine departed in acrimony and established the Stellar Ministry, “a short-lived religious group that taught a mixture of Hermeticism and Christianity.” Another more recent schism in the Church of Light is the Light of Egypt, headed up by a past president, Linden Liesge.

== Activities ==
The 21 volume Brotherhood of Light lessons are publicly accessible to nonmembers of the church, but only members participate in a system of written examinations covering each volume. Each examination passed advances the member one degree. Seven volumes each are devoted to astrology, alchemy, and magic. Students who complete all 21 degrees (including examinations) are awarded a “Hermetician’s Certificate.”

Church headquarters were located through 1999 at 117 (later 2341) Coral Street in Los Angeles, which had been the home of the Benjamines. After several years based in Brea, California, in 2005 it relocated to Albuquerque, New Mexico. Regular classes and services are held at its headquarters, 2119 Gold Avenue, many of which are viewable as live streams and archived on the church website. The current president is Margaret Joscher.

== See also ==
- Emma Hardinge Britten
- Hermetic Brotherhood of Light
- Hermetic Order of the Golden Dawn
- Mysticism
- Occult
- Spiritualism (movement)
- Genevieve Stebbins
- Max Theon
- Theosophy
- Western esotericism

== Sources ==
- The Church of Light, "Vision for the 21st Century"
- The Church of Light, "Where We Are Located."
