= Terry Cole-Whittaker =

American writer and minister (1939–2024)

- Born: Terry Cole-Whittaker; December 3, 1939; Los Angeles, California
- Died: October 23, 2024 (aged 84)
- Occupations: minister, author

Rev. Terry Cole-Whittaker (December 3, 1939 – October 23, 2024) was a New Thought author, United Church of Religious Science minister, and the founder of Terry Cole-Whittaker Ministries and Adventures in Enlightenment.

== History ==
Cole-Whittaker became familiar with what she called the "Principals of Prosperity" through the actions of a teacher in high school. She would go on to enter the Mrs. America Pageant, in 1968 becoming Mrs. California and winning third place in the national competition. She later joined the Los Angeles Civic Light Opera and became an opera singer. She also started a company, Success Plus, where she was an inspirational speaker.

She earned a Doctor of Divinity degree in 1973, was ordained as a minister of the United Church of Religious Science in 1975 and became the pastor of a fifty-member congregation of that church in La Jolla in 1977. The church drew as many as 5,000 people for Easter Sunday, and eventually expanded to include a grammar school, a ministry school, and five teaching centers. She began a television program in 1979, which was at the time syndicated to fifteen television stations in the country.

In 1982, Cole-Whittaker left the United Church of Religious Science and founded Terry Cole-Whittaker Ministries. She drew over 4,000 people to her weekly services and provided them with newsletters and instructional videos. Her celebrity parishioners included Gavin MacLeod, Linda Gray, Lily Tomlin, and Eydie Gormé.

Her prosperity theology was criticized publicly with labels such as Pastor to the Yuppies, Archbishop of the Upbeat, Oracle of Optimism, the Evangelist of Me.

Despite raising $6 million in 1984, her ministry raked in a debt of around $900,000 in 1985, prompting her to cease production of the Emmy award winning television show and leave her congregation during Easter. By October, she had created a new Foundation, Adventures in Enlightenment, which organized tours to meet with her one-on-one in exotic locations, e.g., Machu Picchu, the Himalayas.

The Foundation later purchased land in Washington State to build a retreat center and start an organic farm. She later started an ashram and library in India to teach Westerners traditional Indian religion.

== Published works ==
- What You Think of Me is None of My Business (1979)
- How to Have More in a Have Not World (1983) New York Times Best seller
- The Inner Path from Where you are to Where you Want to be (1986)
- Dare to Be Great (2001)
- Creating Your Destiny – A Remarkable Guide to Making Decisions that Give You Happiness and Prosperity
- Every Saint Has a Past, Every Sinner a Future: Seven Steps to the Spiritual and Material Riches
- Love and Power in a World Without Limits, Women’s Guide to the Goddess Within
- Live Your Bliss (2009)
