= Exotheology =

Examination of theological issues as they pertain to extraterrestrial intelligence

Exotheology is the examination of theological issues as they pertain to extraterrestrial intelligence. The term was coined in the 1960s or early 1970s. It is primarily concerned either with conjecture about possible theological beliefs that extraterrestrials might have, or how human theologies might conceivably be influenced by evidence of and/or interaction with extraterrestrials.

One of the main themes of exotheology is applying the concept of extraterrestrials who are sentient, and more to the point, endowed with a soul, as a thought experiment to the examination of a given theology, mostly variations of Christian theology, but occasionally also Jewish theology or other faiths.

== General ==
Exotheologian Joel L. Parkyn, in his book Exotheology: Theological Explorations of Intelligent Extraterrestrial Life (2021), examined the conjunction of human religion and a putative contact or disclosure scenario regarding intelligent extraterrestrial civilization as advanced by proponents of ufology. According to Parkyn, the consequences for human religions in such a scenario depend heavily on the mode, means, and proximity of extraterrestrial contact; whether via radio interferometer, alien artifacts discovered on nearby planets or their satellites in our Solar System, extraterrestrial probes encountered on Earth or in space, direct contact in space or in Earth orbit, or contact at one or more sites on Earth. Inherent variables such as message content, interpretation, extraterrestrial agendas, and whether an advanced civilization would assume a cooperative, hostile, ambivalent or other posture with Earth leadership will likely determine short-term and long-term outcomes. Intelligent extraterrestrial contact/communication of a religious nature could result in the reformulation of key theological principles among Earth religions, potentially redefining/illuminating certain Earth-bound conceptions of God, creation, the meaning of human existence and the afterlife.

Humanity in a contact or disclosure scenario should not expect a monolithic theological, programmatic, or psychological response among religious institutions and individual believers due to the great variety of institutional, communal, and individual perspectives. Notably, there have been long-standing concerns with regard to certain Christian denominations, with negative reactions predicted among fundamentalist-oriented theologies, which typically advocate strictly anthropocentric and geocentric views. The Brookings Report titled "Proposed Studies on the Implications of Peaceful Space Activities for Human Affairs", funded by NASA in 1960, in a section titled "The Implications of a Discovery of Extraterrestrial Life", stated in particular with regard to these perspectives: "The positions of the major American religious denominations, the Christian sects, and the Eastern religions on the matter of extraterrestrial life needs elucidation...For them, the discovery of other life-rather than any other space product-would be electrifying..." For these faiths, evidence and/or official acknowledgement of extraterrestrial intelligence could prove especially damaging. Official governmental disclosure of an intelligent extraterrestrial reality, whether originating in the United States or another country, in conjunction with political leaders, industry and academic experts, religious authorities, as well as media interpretation, reaction, and public dissemination will have a large influence formulating interpretation and hence public responses.

Extraterrestrials could positively expand their religious consciousness in their contacts with other races, including humans; or, conversely, their influence could become a source of conflict, resulting in the subjugation, trivialization, relativization, or syncretization of indigenous religious beliefs and values in relation to their own. A more primitive extraterrestrial religion, or religion held among less advanced, remotely discovered societies, would likely pose little challenge to Earth religions. However, one more complex or belonging to a more ancient, culturally and/or technologically advanced race could present theological and religious challenges for certain believers. Species with advanced religions may avoid direct contact with the less advanced so as to not disturb their natural cultural evolution according to their particular religious, situational, technological, and historical era. Alternatively, an encounter with advanced extraterrestrials devoid of religious beliefs, or their explicit or implicit acceptance of agnosticism or atheism, may discourage religiosity among certain human populations.

It is possible that benign extraterrestrial societies may not desire to impart too much information, particularly of a religious nature, if they are aware of potential socially and psychologically disruptive effects on a terrestrial-bound populace. It would be reasonable therefore that benevolent extraterrestrials planning a contact/disclosure event would prepare, either by long-term furtive intervention and/or in coordination with certain governments, so that human cultural evolution produces technological and scientific advances, as well as the prerequisite theological, philosophical, and psychological perspectives, or cultural alignment, to mitigate social disruption. In this case, a process of large-scale social and psychological conditioning to accommodate an extraterrestrial civilizational acknowledgement could be on the scale of many decades to one or two centuries given our current civilizational epoch.

== Christianity ==
In the creation stories in Genesis and outside the Bible there is no mention of extraterrestrial life. Passages like John 10:16 and 1 Peter 3:18-20 are more likely to speak about Gentiles or people who died before Jesus.

Late Antique and Medieval Theologians like Augustine, Albertus Magnus and Thomas Aquinas, in the platonic and Aristotelian tradition generally rejected the idea of extraterrestrial life. The first notable theologian to think otherwise was the bishop of Paris Etienne Tempier. This renewed the discussion and some theologians were now more positive to the possibility of other worlds with different lifeforms. Van Vorilong stated that The Crucifixion also brought salvation to inhabitants of other worlds.

Celtics scholar Mark Williams also compares modern exotheology with the problems medieval Irish authors faced in integrating the non-human Tuatha de Danann (otherworldly beings worshipped as gods in the pagan time) into Christian worldview without explicitly denying or demonizing them.

The discussion started to become more prevalent due to the introduction of the heliocentric model. Early discussions evolved e.g. around the question of original sin. Tommaso Campanella claimed that not descending from Adam, inhabitants of other planets would not need salvation.

The Christian writer C. S. Lewis, in a 1950s article in the Christian Herald contemplated the possibility of the Son of God incarnating on extraterrestrial worlds, or else that God could devise an entirely distinct plan of salvation for extraterrestrial communities from the one for humans.

In 1951, Los Angeles-based Science Fiction writer Ray Bradbury wrote a short story entitled "The Fire Balloons" as part of short story collection from the Illustrated Man, and ultimately believed that space travel and the discovery of new species and genera of life would - as earthly exploration once did - ultimately serve and expand God's kingdom. He felt that space travel with the same terrestrial laws and moral principles would also apply in outer space. As two clergymen are arguing about extraterrestrial life and outer space, one priest asks:

Learn what? That most of the things we’ve taught in the past on earth don’t fit out there in Mars or Venus… [To] Drive Adam and Eve out of some new Garden, on Jupiter, with our very own rocket fires? Or worse, find out there is no Eden, no Adam, no Eve, no damned serpent, no Fall, no original sin, no Annunciation, no Birth, no Son, you go on with the list, no nothing at all? Is that what we must learn, pastor? If need be, yes, said Pastor Sheldon. It’s the Lord’s space and the Lord’s world in space, Father. We must try not to take our cathedrals with us, when all we need is an overnight case

Exotheologian Joel L. Parkyn thinks that Modern Christians could be tasked with the substantiation or invalidation of an extraterrestrial belief system; an interpretation of such would likely follow according to their distinctive theological predilections, texts, doctrines, and traditions, and their corollaries according to Christian tradition. As such, there may be areas of agreement, those of small adjustment, of wholesale redefinition, or complete incompatibility. Conversely, universal humanist and fundamental moral prerogatives and precepts of Earth religions need not conflict with those recognized as extraterrestrial supernaturally legitimate religions, as truth cannot contradict truth; other revelations of divinity cannot exist fundamentally juxtaposed with divinely revealed truth in another intelligent creation.

Lutheran theologian Ted Peters (2003) said that the questions raised by the possibility of extraterrestrial life are not new to Christian theology and do not pose, as said by other authors, a threat for Christian dogma. Peters says that medieval theology had frequently considered the question of "what if God had created many worlds?", as had the earlier Church Fathers in discussion of the Antipodes.

The Catholic theologian Corrado Balducci often discussed the question in Italian popular media, and in 2001 published a statement UFOs and Extraterrestrials - A Problem for the Church?. In a 2008 statement, José Gabriel Funes, head of the Vatican Observatory, said "Just as there is a multiplicity of creatures on earth, there can be other beings, even intelligent, created by God. This is not in contrast with our faith because we can't put limits on God's creative freedom".

Smaller denominations also have similar treatments in passing in their key writings: Christian Science and the Course in Miracles treat extraterrestrials as effectively brother spiritual beings in a non-absolute physical experience, the founder of the former writing, "The universe of Spirit is peopled with spiritual beings,...", and Emanuel Swedenborg wrote, "Anyone with a sound intellect can know from many considerations that there are numerous worlds with people on them. Rational thought leads to the conclusion that massive bodies such as the planets, some of which are larger than our own earth, are not empty masses created merely to wander aimlessly around the sun, and shine with their feeble light on one planet. No, they must have a much greater purpose than that. ... What would one planet be to God, who is infinite, and for whom thousands, or even tens of thousands of planets, all full of inhabitants, would be such a trifling matter as to be almost nothing?"

== Mormonism ==
In the largest Mormon denomination, the Church of Jesus Christ of Latter-day Saints, their canonized scripture teaches of many worlds other than Earth currently inhabited by people. One of the top leaders Spencer W. Kimball wrote that God has created many worlds populated with his children, and stated, "Are planets out in space inhabited by intelligent creatures? Without doubt."

== Judaism ==
Rabbi Aryeh Kaplan, who was also a physicist, was inclined toward the belief in extraterrestrial life, citing Jewish authorities, including medieval philosopher Rabbi Hasdai Crescas (Ohr Hashem 4:2) and 18th-century Kabbalist Rabbi Pinchas Eliyahu Horowitz (Sefer HaBris). Kaplan writes, "We therefore find the basic thesis of the Sefer HaBris supported by a number of clear-cut statements by our Sages. There may even be other forms of intelligent life in the universe, but such life forms do not have free will, and therefore do not have moral responsibility"—at least in the same sense as human beings. Kaplan also cites the book of Judges 5:23 ("Cursed is Meroz..."), about which Rashi, a major medieval Jewish commentator and thinker, said, "Some say [Meroz] was a planet, and some say [Meroz] was a prominent person who was near the battle area and yet did not come [to intervene]."

Rabbi Norman Lamm, former chancellor of Yeshiva University, also wrote on this subject, saying that if the existence of extraterrestrial life should be confirmed, religious scholars must revise previous assumptions to the contrary. He, too, does not rule out this possibility from an Orthodox Jewish point of view.

Rabbi Joseph B. Soloveitchik is said to have remarked that life on other planets would only reflect God's greatness, which exceeds mortal understanding, while not contradicting the role of the Jewish people to heed the Torah and in so doing to perform God's will here on earth.

== Islam ==
Depending on the suras cited, the Quran of Islam appears to leave open the door to the idea of extraterrestrials, as in 27:65, situated similarly on par with humans subject to a divine judgment leading toward a heaven or hell as reward or punishment for the deeds of one's life.

== See also ==
- Cosmic pluralism
- Exopolitics
- Potential cultural impact of extraterrestrial contact
- Ufology
- UFO religion
- Giordano Bruno
