= Ausar Auset Society =

American pan-African spiritual organization

- Formation: 1973
- Type: Religious / Spiritual
- Headquarters: Brooklyn, New York, US
- Shekhem Ur Shekhem: Ra Un Nefer Amen

The Ausar Auset Society is a Pan-African spiritual organization founded in 1973 by Ra Un Nefer Amen.

It is based in Brooklyn, New York, with chapters in several major cities in the United States as well as international chapters in London, England, Toronto, Canada, Bermuda and Trinidad and Tobago. The organization provides afrocentric-based spiritual training to the African American community in particular and to the African diaspora in general.

== Some publications ==
- Amen, Ra Un Nefer, Harlem River Arrangement: The I Ching Transcripts, 1984
- Amen, Ra Un Nefer, Metu Neter Vol. 1, 1990
- Amen, Ra Un Nefer, Ma'at, The 11 Laws of God, 2003
- Amen, Ra Un Nefer, Meditation Fundamentals Software, 2007
- Amen, Ra Un Nefer, Nuk Au Neter: The Kamitic Holy Scriptures, 2008
- Living Legacy DVD: The History of the Ausar Auset Society, 2009
- Amen, Ra Un Nefer. Metu Neter Vol. 2, Anuk Ausar, The Kamitic Initiation System, Brooklyn, NY: Khamit Corp, 1994.
- Amen, Ra Un Nefer. Metu Neter Vol. 3, The Key to Miracles, Brooklyn, NY: Khamit Visions, Inc., 2008.
- Amen, Ra Un Nefer. Metu Neter Vol. 4, The Ausarian Resurrection; The Initiate's Daily Meditation Guide, Khamit Media Trans Media, Inc., 2010.
- Amen, Ra Un Nefer. Metu Neter Vol. 5, Key to Health & Longevity, Brooklyn, NY: Khamitic Media, Inc., 2011.
