= Richard Zenor =

American spiritual medium (1911–1978)

Richard Zenor (1911-1978) was a medium who channeled the master teacher Agasha and founded the Agasha Temple of Wisdom. Zenor's teachings were later collected in book form by one of the Temple's members, William Eisen, in the 1980s. The book Telephone Between Worlds, by James Crenshaw, was written about Zenor and Agasha.

Agasha is also mentioned in the Churning of the Heart-Vol II by Swami Shivom Tirtha, a spiritual guru from India in the Shaktipat tradition and a disciple of Swami Vishnu Tirtha. Swami Vishnu Tirth Maharaj was one among the 273 people accompanying Agasha 7000 years ago in Egypt.
