= List of UFO religions =

UFO religions are religious groups that deal with alleged communication between humans and extraterrestrial beings. Some adherents of UFO religions believe that the arrival or rediscovery of alien civilizations, technologies, and spirituality will enable humans to overcome current ecological, spiritual, and social problems. Issues such as hatred, war, bigotry, poverty and so on are said to be resolvable through the use of superior alien technology and spiritual abilities. Such belief systems are also described as millenarian in their outlook. Alien abduction belief can lead to formation of a UFO religion. UFO religions originated with Theosophy, and many UFO religions still have many of the key points associated with Theosophy, such as belief in the same Spiritual Hierarchy. UFO religions can also be comparable to New Age thought. Scholars identify the 1947 Roswell incident as a key event within the history of UFO spirituality.

"I AM" Activity, founded in 1930 by Guy Ballard, is seen, according to one author, as the first UFO Religion, though the Aetherius Society founded by George King has also been given this distinction. Heaven's Gate and Order of the Solar Temple, which both committed mass suicides, are seen as the most controversial of the UFO belief groups. Scientology is seen by scholars as a UFO religion, due to its Xenu cosmogony and the usage of space opera in Scientology doctrine.

== List ==
| Image | Name | Founder | Founded | Founding country | Refs. |
|---|---|---|---|---|---|
| | Aetherius Society | George King | 1955 | UK | |
| | Antrovis | Edward Mielnik | 1980s | PL | |
| | Ashtar Galactic Command | Thelma B. Terrill | 1977 | US | |
| | Association of Sananda and Sanat Kumara | Dorothy Martin | 1965 | US | |
| | Armageddon Time Ark Base | Orville Nodrog | 1966 | US | |
| | Blue Rose Ministry | Robert E. Short | 1960s | US | |
| | Cassiopaean Experiment | Laura Knight Jadczyk and Arkadiusz Jadczyk | | US | |
| | CEIRUS | Jean Miguères | 1987 | FR | |
| | Chen Tao | Hon-ming Chen | 1993 | TW | |
| | Chino's True Law | Chino Yuko | 1977 | JP | |
| | Christ Brotherhood | Wallace C. Halsey | 1956 | US | |
| | Church Universal and Triumphant | Mark L. Prophet | 1958 | US | |
| | Comunidade Figueira | José Trigueirinho Neto | 1980s | BR | |
| | Cosmic Circle of Fellowship | William R. Ferguson | 1955 | US | |
| | Cosmic Star Temple | Violet Gilbert | 1960 | US | |
| | Cosmon Research Foundation | Gloria Lee | 1959 | US | |
| | Delval UFO, Inc. | Anthony Volpe and Lynn Volpe | 1972 | US | |
| | École de la préparation à l'évacuation extraterrestre | Jeanine Derel | | FR | |
| | Extraterrestrial Earth Mission | Savizar and Silarra | 1986 | US | |
| | Falun Gong | Li Hongzhi | 1992 | CN | |
| | Fiat Lux | Erika Bertschinger Eike | 1980 | DE | |
| | Freie Interessengemeinschaft für Grenz- und Geisteswissenschaften und Ufologiestudien | Billy Meier | 1970s | CH | |
| | George Adamski Foundation | Alice Wells and Charlotte Blob | 1965 | US | |
| | God Light Association | Shinji Takahashi | 1969 | JP | |
| | Ground Crew Project | Sheldon Nidle | 1980s | US | |
| | The Ground Crew | Valerie Donner | 1996 | US | |
| | Happy Science | Ryuho Okawa | 1986 | JP | |
| | Heaven's Gate | Marshall Applewhite and Bonnie Nettles | 1970s | US | |
| | International Get Acquainted Program | H.C. Petersen | 1965 | DK | |
| | "I AM" Activity | Guy Ballard | 1930s | US | |
| | Interplanetary Connections | Darryl Anka | 1980s | US | |
| | Industrial Church of the New World Comforter | Allen Michael | 1973 | US | |
| | Last Day Messengers | Dave W. Bent | 1950s | US | |
| | Mark-Age | Charles Boyd Gentzel and Pauline Sharpe | 1962 | US | |
| | Ministry of Universal Wisdom | George Van Tassel | 1962 | US | |
| Flag of the Nation of Islam | Nation of Islam | Wallace Fard Muhammad | 1930 | US | |
| | Néo-Phare | Arnaud Mussy | 2001 | FR | |
| | Nibiruan Council | Jelaila Starr | 1997 | US | |
| | Nuwaubian Nation | Dwight York | 1970s | US | |
| Order of the Solar Temple logo | Order of the Solar Temple | Joseph Di Mambro and Luc Jouret | 1984 | CH | |
| | Projeto Alvorada | Ferreira Neto | 1982 | BR | |
| | Projeto Portal | Urandir Fernandes de Oliveira | 2000 | BR | |
| Raëlian symbol | Raëlism | Raël | 1974 | FR | |
| | Rational Culture | Manoel Jacintho Coelho | 1935 | BR | |
| | Religion of Eternal Life Holy Society of God | Cho Hui-song | 1981 | KR | |
| | Sanctuary of Thought | Truman Bethurum | 1950s | US | |
| | Science Research Center | Halûk Sarıkaya | 1978 | TR | |
| Scientology logo | Scientology | L. Ron Hubbard | 1952 | US | |
| | The Seekers | Charles Laughead and Dorothy Martin | 1953 | US | |
| | Share International | Benjamin Creme | 1970s | UK | |
| | Siderella | Jean-Paul Appel | 1966 | FR | |
| | Solar Light Retreat | Marianne Francis | 1960s | US | |
| | Star Light Fellowship | Sterling Warren and Jackie Altisi | 1962 | US | |
| | Sunburst | Norman Paulsen | 1969 | US | |
| | Unarius Academy of Science | Ernest Norman and Ruth Norman | 1954 | US | |
| | Universariun Foundation | Zelrun Karsleigh and Daisy Karsleigh | 1958 | US | |
| | Universe People | Ivo A. Benda | 1997 | CZ | |
| | Universe Society Church | Hal Wilcox | 1951 | US | |
| | Urantia movement | Based on a book of unknown authorship; spawned a loosely organized series of many groups | 1924 at the earliest and 1955 at the latest | US | |
| | Valley of the Dawn | Neiva Chaves Zelaya | 1960s | BR | |
| | White Star | Doris C. LeVesque | 1957 | US | |
| | World Brotherhood Union | Bülent Çorak | 1980s | TR | |
| | World Understanding | Daniel Fry | 1955 | US | |

== See also ==
- List of new religious movements
- List of ufologists
- List of UFO organizations
