= Tim Maia Racional =

Studio album by Tim Maia

- Vol. 1 cover

Studio album by Tim Maia
- Released: Vol. 1 and Vol. 2: Early 1975; Vol. 3: 2011
- Recorded: Vol. 1 and Vol. 2: July–August 1974; Vol. 3: 1975
- Studio: RCA Studios, Rio de Janeiro, Brazil
- Genre: Progressive soul, funk, samba funk, gospel
- Length: Vol. 1: 33:18; Vol. 2: 41:16; Vol. 3: 28:57
- Language: Brazilian Portuguese, English
- Label: Seroma, Editora Abril
- Producer: Tim Maia

Tim Maia Racional is an album trilogy by Brazilian singer-songwriter Tim Maia. The first two volumes were released in early 1975 by Seroma, Maia's own record label, while Volume 3 was released posthumously. They were recorded in RCA Records studios between July and August 1974. The albums were largely ignored by the specialized press in its release and showed low sales, much of it due to its low commercial appeal – given the song lyrics which advertised an UFO religion with few followers – and the semi-amateur record distribution by Maia's independent label.

Over time, despite Maia's attempts to remove the album from the public consciousness, with the destruction of the records and a prohibition on re-issues and re-recordings, the trilogy became a cult classic, with the original vinyl discs becoming rare and expensive. Since the 1990s, with the revival of 1970s Brazilian black music, pressure grew for the re-release of the albums, which only happened after the artist's death. The trilogy is considered as one of the high points in Maia's career, due in part to its arrangements and his vocal quality.

== Background ==
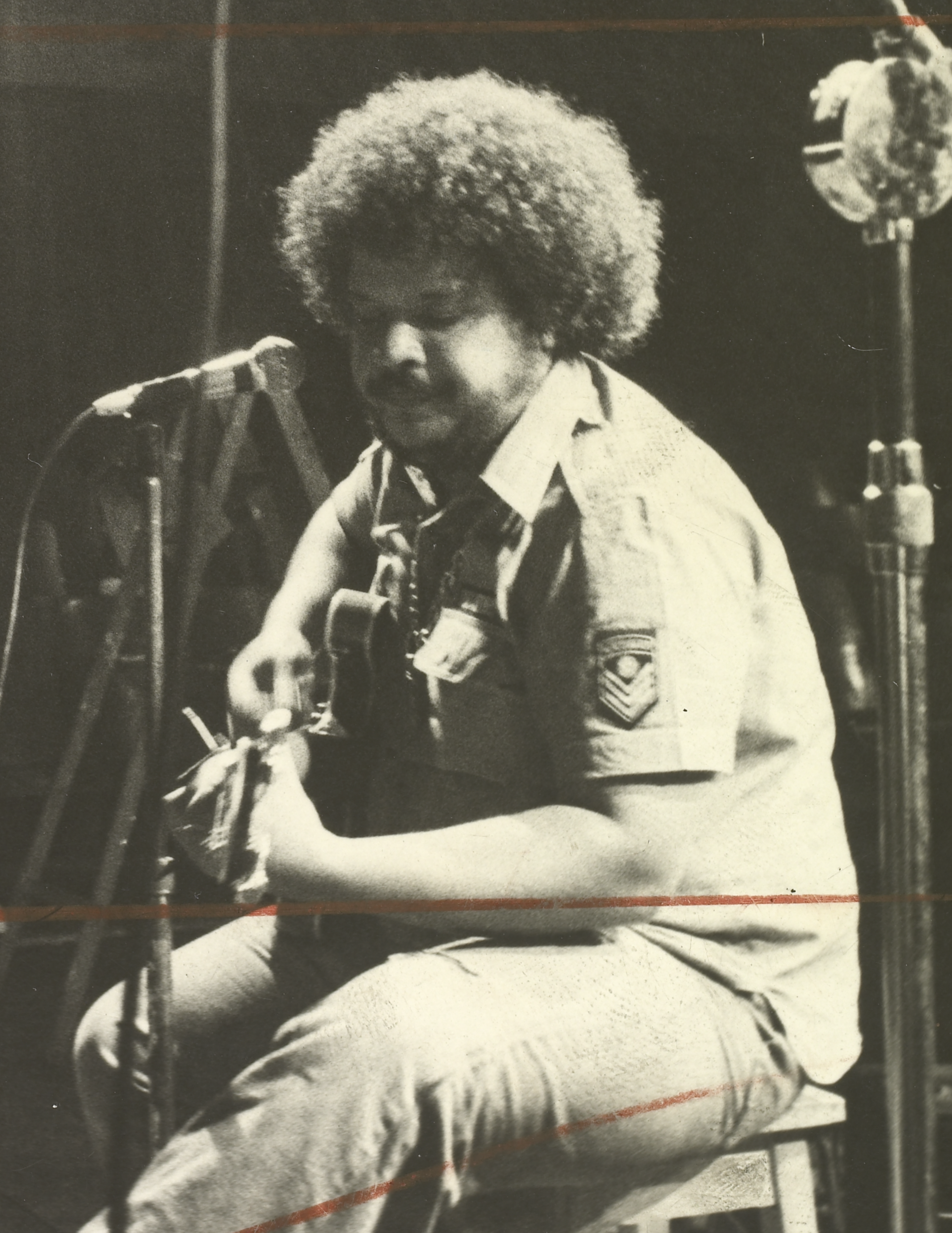
Maia in 1972

After the release of his self-titled 1973 album, Maia wished to record a double album. He spoke with André Midani, the president of Polydor Records his then-current label, who in return rescinded Maia's contract. Maia received an offer from RCA to record his double album and was also offered "something like $300,000 as a signing bonus". His contract stipulated that the album would be self-produced by Seroma, with RCA buying the finished record. Due to the record being fully produced by his own production company, Maia had full freedom to choose his own musicians, studio and technicians.

== Recording and production ==
In early 1974, Maia started recording the basis for the songs in the studios of his new label, in Rio de Janeiro. During his spare time, he would visit other musicians. According to Tibério Gaspar, during one of the visits, while Gaspar was taking a bath, Maia found Universo em Desencanto – Rational Culture's main book – in the living room. When Gaspar left the bathroom, Maia asked him about the book, to which Gaspar explained that his father frequented Rational Culture's meetings. Maia asked to meet Manoel Jacintho Coelho, Rational Culture's creator, which Gaspar obliged to. He left with the book, and begun his religious conversion. His adoption of Rational Culture was a shock to his friends and family, as he had previously rejected the Catholic faith his family followed. When Maia performed at the inaugural Teatro Bandeirantes show, on 12 August, he performed "Imunização Racional (Que Beleza)", and gave a speech promoting the religion. Maia gradually started absorbing Rational Culture's practices, such as cutting down his afro and shaving his beard, wearing only white clothes, and giving up drugs. He delivered an ultimatum to his band, requesting that all members join the religion, or be kicked out, which most complied to.

After starting his conversion, Maia began reworking the songs from the double album, adding lyrics praising Rational Culture, and replacing the lyrics in songs which already had them. RCA, which had been very excited with the material being produced, became worried with Maia's religious turn and predicted a fight when the disc was ready. In late August, after the work was done, Maia spoke with the label executives. The label alleged that it was not content with the material and was not willing to buy it. To their surprise, Maia offered to keep the tapes on which his double album was recorded and rescind the contract. He would press and distribute the LP by himself, transforming his music publishing company Seroma into a record label.

== Music and lyrics ==
=== Volume 1 ===
Side A starts with "Imunização Racional (Que Beleza)", a "haunting" mix of soul and reggae. Created before Maia's religious conversion, it was first song to be reworked, and did not mention Rational Culture explicitly, receiving only minor lyric retouches. It was the only track that was distributed to radio stations. Afterwards, Maia salutes Coelho through a cappella on "O Grão Mestre Varonil", praising him as "the greatest man in the world". The third track is "Bom Senso", a deep funk song on which Maia narrates his conversion through his previous life experiences and urges the listener to read Universo em Desencanto. After "Energia Racional", a small interlude, comes "Leia o Livro Universo em Desencanto", a slow romantic track in which Maia repeatedly utters "mantra-like lyrics". "Contato com o Mundo Racional", a mellow blues track where Maia asks for a contact with the rational world, closes side A.

Side B opens with "Universo em Desencanto", a samba-soul track in which the singer explains the creation theory preached by Rational Culture. Afterwards comes another a cappella track, where Maia summarizes the doctrine explained in the last track, this time in English. The album's closer is a long funk gospel song, loaded with many keyboards and guitar solos, in which Maia emulates Stevie Wonder and Herbie Hancock, singing in English and addressing the listener.

=== Volume 2 ===
Volume 2's Side A starts with "Quer Queira Quer não Queira", a soul track with strong African and Caribbean music accents, being one of the tracks completed before Maia's conversion, like "Adiós San Juan de Puerto Rico", and which had its lyrics changed. Afterwards comes "Paz Interior", a samba-soul song composed by Edson Trindade, featuring autobiographical lyrics. The third song is "O Caminho do Bem", composed by Beto Cajueiro, Serginho Trombone and Paulinho Guitarra, which is a slow funk with minimalist keyboards and a wah-wah guitar, mixed with the repetition of the track's title as a mantra. The next song, "Energia Racional", transforms the vignette from the first volume into another mantra which is repeated above a repetitive and danceable musical base. Side A ends with "Que Legal", a funky track with mambo, salsa and rumba influences, specially in its percussion.

Side B begins with "Cultura Racional", another song composed by Beto Cajueiro. It is a romantic ballad which was converted into a propaganda song for the cult. The same happened to "O Dever de Fazer Propaganda deste Conhecimento", by Robson Jorge, which is also a ballad, but a typical 1970s soul. Afterwards, "Guiné Bissau, Moçambique e Angola Racional" again talk about Africa, with an optimistic view towards the continent, interleaved with a rock guitar solo. The album closes with a second version of "Imunização Racional (Que Beleza)", ending again with African influences in the percussion and horns.

== Release ==
=== Volumes 1 and 2 ===
The albums were released in early 1975 by record label Seroma, Tim Maia's own independent label. Instead of releasing a double album as intended, Maia released two regular albums. The singer did not sign any distribution contracts, instead leaving a few discs in consignment with stores that agreed to sell them, and some being sold door-to-door by Maia and his musicians. As such, promotion was hampered by the lack of a national distribution, as well as Maia's difficulty in finding gigs: the few he managed to perform were either for free or only to members of the Rational religion. In addition, only one song from the album received any radio airplay, "Imunização Racional (Que Beleza)". As a result, sales estimates are extremely low, especially given the difficulties the singer experienced at the end of the Rational period.

=== Volume 3 ===
Maia abandoned the cult on 25 September 1975, and renounced the previous albums; therefore, Vol. 3 ended up not being released. Four of its six tracks were leaked online. Produced by Paulinho Guitarra and Kassin, besides the illegally distributed tracks, the ballad "O Supermundo Racional" remained unpublished. In 2011, Editora Abril released the Tim Maia Collection containing fifteen albums recorded by the singer, with Tim Maia Racional, Vol. 3 finally being officially released.

== Reception ==
The albums were largely ignored by critics at the time of their release. However, they became the subject of critical analysis after the 90s, specially after their re-releases on CD in 2006. Alexandre Matias, writing for the digital magazine Digestivo Cultural, considered the discs an outlier in Maia's career, saying that "[he] lived how he wanted [...] [he lived] a fickle life. [..] But for a moment in his career, he tried to redeem himself. For real." AllMusic's Matt Rinaldi praised the first album, specially the lean arrangements that vary imperceptibly between a danceable funk and a heavy swing with blues accents, incorporating elements of reggae, psychedelic rock and Motown-style soul.

== Legacy ==
After leaving the cult, on 25 September 1975, Tim Maia began a campaign to erase the albums and this phase of his career from public consciousness, destroying all the records that were still in his possession, as well as banning re-releases and discouraging re-recordings of the material by other interested artists, such as Marisa Monte, who was interested in re-recording "Imunização Racional (Que Beleza)". Even so, the albums ended up developing a cult status, with the material being fought over by collectors and becoming highly expensive due to its rarity and quality. One of the reasons given for this is that Maia's conversion represented a significant change in his troubled personal life, as he stopped drinking and using drugs, something that reflected directly and positively on the quality of his voice.

As such, despite Maia's dislike of the albums, and the harsh criticism received during the time of its release, they are regarded as some of the greatest moments in his career, being marked by their low commercial appeal – with lyrics showing devotion to Rational Culture – and for the sound, that was influenced by North American soul and funk musicians such as Barry White, Marvin Gaye and George Clinton. In 2007, Rolling Stone Brasil listed the first two albums in its list of 100 greatest Brazilian records of all time, coming in at number 17.

=== Re-releases ===
After a long debate in the 90s and early 2000s between Maia - and after his death, his heirs - and various artists for the legacy of the albums released during this phase of his career, the album was re-issued as a CD in April 2006 by the label Trama, which reached an agreement with the legal owners of the music rights. Music videos were also released by university students for the songs "Imunização Racional (Que Beleza)", "Bom Senso" and "Leia o Livro Universo em Desencanto", as part of a contest. The original vinyls released by Seroma that were not destroyed after Tim's departure from Rational Culture were sold for high prices. The re-issue was controversial. Singer-songwriter Hyldon, Maia's former partner, believed that the re-release was disrespectful to Maia's wishes, as the disc was a failure and was disowned by him during his life.

In 2019, both albums from Maia's rational phase were launched on several streaming services, a year after the same happened with his first records.

== Track listing ==
=== Volume 1 ===
All lyrics are written by Tim Maia; all music is composed by Tim Maia.

Side A
No.	Title	Length
1.	"Imunização Racional (Que Beleza)"	5:08
2.	"O Grão Mestre Varonil"	0:24
3.	"Bom Senso"	5:08
4.	"Energia Racional"	0:15
5.	"Leia o Livro Universo em Desencanto"	2:50
6.	"Contato com o Mundo Racional"	3:06
Total length:		16:51

Side B
No.	Title	Length
1.	"Universo em Desencanto"	3:43
2.	"You Don't Know What I Know"	0:35
3.	"Rational Culture"	12:09
Total length:		16:27

=== Volume 2 ===
All lyrics are written by Tim Maia; all music is composed by Tim Maia, except where noted.

Side A
No.	Title	Music	Length
1.	"Quer Queira Quer não Queira"	Fábio and Maia	4:50
2.	"Paz Interior"	Edson Trindade	2:56
3.	"O Caminho do Bem"	Beto Cajueiro, Serginho Trombone and Paulinho Guitarra	6:10
4.	"Energia Racional"		2:57
5.	"Que Legal"		4:13
Total length:			21:06

Side B
No.	Title	Music	Length
1.	"Cultura Racional"	Cajueiro	4:39
2.	"O Dever de Fazer Propaganda deste Conhecimento"	Robson Jorge	5:53
3.	"Guiné Bissau, Moçambique e Angola Racional"		6:09
4.	"Imunização Racional (Que Beleza)"		3:29
Total length:			20:10

=== Volume 3 ===
All lyrics are written by Tim Maia; all music is composed by Tim Maia.

Side A
No.	Title	Length
1.	"É Preciso Ler e Reler"	4:05
2.	"I Am Rational"	5:20
3.	"Lendo o Livro"	3:36
4.	"O Supermundo Racional"	5:15
5.	"Nação Cósmica"	6:25
6.	"Que Legal"	4:16
Total length:		28:57

== Personnel ==
Credits for Tim Maia Racional adapted from Tim Maia's Tim Maia Racional Vols. 1 & 2 and Vale tudo.

- Tim Maia – primary artist, production and arrangement, vocals, guitar, flute and bass
- Fábio – vocals and guitar
- Amaro – backing vocals
- Camarão – backing vocals
- Paulinho Guitarra – guitar and bass
- Robson Jorge – guitar, keyboards and bass
- Cassiano – guitar
- Ari Piazzarolo – guitar
- Beto Cajueiro – guitar and bass
- Neco – guitar
- José Roberto Bertrami – guitar
- Paulinho Trompete – trumpet
- Paulinho Martins – trumpet
- Oberdan Magalhães – saxophones and flute
- Serginho Trombone – trombone and keyboards
- Don Charles – keyboards
- Robério Rafael – drums
- Luiz Carlos Batera – drums and percussion
- Hermes – percussion
- Ariovaldo – percussion
- Ronaldo – percussion
- Chacal – percussion
- Chaplin – percussion

== Bibliography ==
- Thayer, Allen (29 November 2018). Tim Maia's Tim Maia Racional Vols. 1 & 2. Bloomsbury Publishing USA. ISBN 978-1-5013-2154-2.
- Motta, Nelson (2006). Vale tudo (in Brazilian Portuguese). Rio de Janeiro: Objetiva. ISBN 978-85-7302-874-4. OCLC 209642803.
- Thayeb, Ali (September 2006). "Irrational Soul". The Fader. No. 60. p. 186. ISSN 1533-5194. OCLC 45791196.
- Matias, Alexandre (9 October 2006). "Tim Maia Racional". Digestivo Cultural (in Brazilian Portuguese).
- Essinger, Silvio (3 May 2000). "O mítico disco de Tim Maia". CliqueMusic (in Brazilian Portuguese). Uol.
- Cruz, Felipe Branco (28 September 2022). "Tim Maia, 80 anos: a seita alienígena que marcou a vida do cantor". VEJA (in Brazilian Portuguese).
- Barreiros, Isabela (2 May 2020). ""Leia o livro Universo em Desencanto": o que é a Cultura Racional?". Aventuras na História (in Brazilian Portuguese).
- Cardoso, Tom (3 April 2025). "'Tim Maia Racional': por que cantor fez de tudo para que disco sumisse do mapa". BBC News Brasil (in Brazilian Portuguese).
