= Tim Maia (album) =

Studio album by Tim Maia
- Released: June 1970
- Recorded: August 1969–May 1970
- Genre: Baião; Soul
- Length: 31:01
- Language: Portuguese; English (tracks 3, 12)
- Label: CBD-Philips
- Producer: Jairo Pires; Arnaldo Saccomani

Tim Maia chronology
Tim Maia (1970)	Tim Maia (1971)

Singles from Tim Maia
- 1. "Jurema" / "Primavera (Vai Chuva)" Released: January 1970; 2. "Azul da Cor do Mar" / "Coroné Antonio Bento" / "Risos" Released: June 1970

Tim Maia is the first studio album by Brazilian singer and composer Tim Maia released in June 1970 by CBD-Philips, through the Polydor label. The recordings took place in August 1969 and between May 1970, at Scatena Studios in São Paulo and CBD in Rio de Janeiro. With good publicity, especially the compact containing "Primavera (Vai Chuva)" which had excellent radio play, the album had very good sales, exceeding 200 thousand copies and Tim Maia earning a gold record.

At the time of its release, critic Carlos Vergueiro congratulated Tim Maia on his interpretation of "Primavera (Vai Chuva)" and considered this and nine other tracks to be the best of the 1970s. The album was chosen in a list by the Brazilian Rolling Stone magazine as the 25th best Brazilian album of all time.

== Background ==
After returning to Brazil, Maia had managed to get three of his songs recorded by friends: "O Durão", by Almir Ricardi; "Você", by Eduardo Araújo; and "Não Vou Ficar", by Roberto Carlos. The latter had been a huge hit when it was released in December 1969. In addition, the singer had managed to release two compact discs: "Meu País" and "Sentimento", released by Discos CBS in 1968; and "These Are the Songs" and "What Do You Want to Bet", released by Fermata in 1969. Both were disappointing sellers. However, the singer's luck began to change when he was signed to the Polydor label – which belonged to the CBD-Philips label, whose new artistic director, Jairo Pires, had met Maia during the recording of his compact disc for CBS, when Jairo was a sound technician. In addition, Os Mutantes and Erasmo Carlos had advertised Maia to André Midani, the label's president. Furthermore, already at the new label, Nelson Motta, who was producing Elis Regina's new album, had heard Maia's recording of "Primavera (Vai Chuva)" and decided to ask him to show Elis his songs. So the singer from Rio Grande do Sul recorded "These Are the Songs" as a duet with the singer from Rio de Janeiro on her new album. The recording ended up going around the label and was responsible for the company speeding up the recording process for her album.

== Recording and production ==
The album had its initial sessions in August 1969 – at the Scatena studio in São Paulo — under the production of Arnaldo Saccomani, when two songs were recorded: "Jurema" and "Primavera (Vai Chuva)". In December 1969, recording began again at the same studio, where the instrumental bases were recorded. In the end, Maia's vocals, the backing vocals and the string and orchestral arrangements were recorded at CBD Studios in Rio de Janeiro, under the production of Jairo Pires.

== Tracks ==
All songs performed by Tim Maia.

Side one
No.	Title	Writer(s)	Length
1.	"Coroné Antônio Bento"	João do Vale, Luís Wanderley	2:16
2.	"Cristina"	Carlos Imperial, Tim Maia	2:09
3.	"Jurema"	Tim Maia	1:18
4.	"Padre Cícero"	Cassiano, Tim Maia	2:25
5.	"Flamengo"	Tim Maia	2:06
6.	"Você Fingiu"	Cassiano	4:04

Side two
No.	Title	Writer(s)	Length
1.	"Eu Amo Você"	Cassiano, Silvio Rochael	4:07
2.	"Primavera (Vai Chuva)"	Cassiano, Silvio Rochael	2:15
3.	"Risos"	Fábio, Paulo Imperial	2:39
4.	"Azul da Cor do Mar"	Tim Maia	3:22
5.	"Cristina Nº 2"	Carlos Imperial, Tim Maia	1:34
6.	"Tributo a Booker Pittman"	Cláudio Roditi	2:48
Total length:			31:01

== Personnel ==
The process of creating Tim Maia attributes the following credits:

=== Musicians ===
- Vocals, acoustic guitar: Tim Maia
- Backing vocals: Os Diagonais (Amaro, Camarão and Cassiano); Fernando, Marcos, Malu Balona, Regininha and Dorinha Tapajós.
- Electric guitar: Cassiano
- Piano and electric organ: Carlinhos
- Bass guitar: Capacete (track 8) and Zé Carlos
- Drums: Paulinho Braga
- Percussion: Guilherme Franco
- Vibraphone: Garoto da Portela

=== Studio production ===
- Production: Jairo Pires and Arnaldo Saccomani
- Audio mastering: Joaquim Figueira
- Recording technicians: João Kibelstis, Marcus Vinicius, Célio Martins, Ary Carvalhães and João Moreira
- Graphic design: Aldo Luiz
- Arrangements: Tim Maia (basic arrangements), Waltel Branco (tracks 2, 6–7, 9–11), Waldir Arouca Barros (tracks 3, 8) and Cláudio Roditi (track 12)

== Bibliography ==
- Motta, Nelson (2007). Vale Tudo – O Som e a Fúria de Tim Maia [Vale Tudo - The Sound and Fury of Tim Maia] (in Brazilian Portuguese). São Paulo: Objetiva. ISBN 9788539000807.
