= Tim Maia =

Brazilian singer-songwriter (1942–1998)

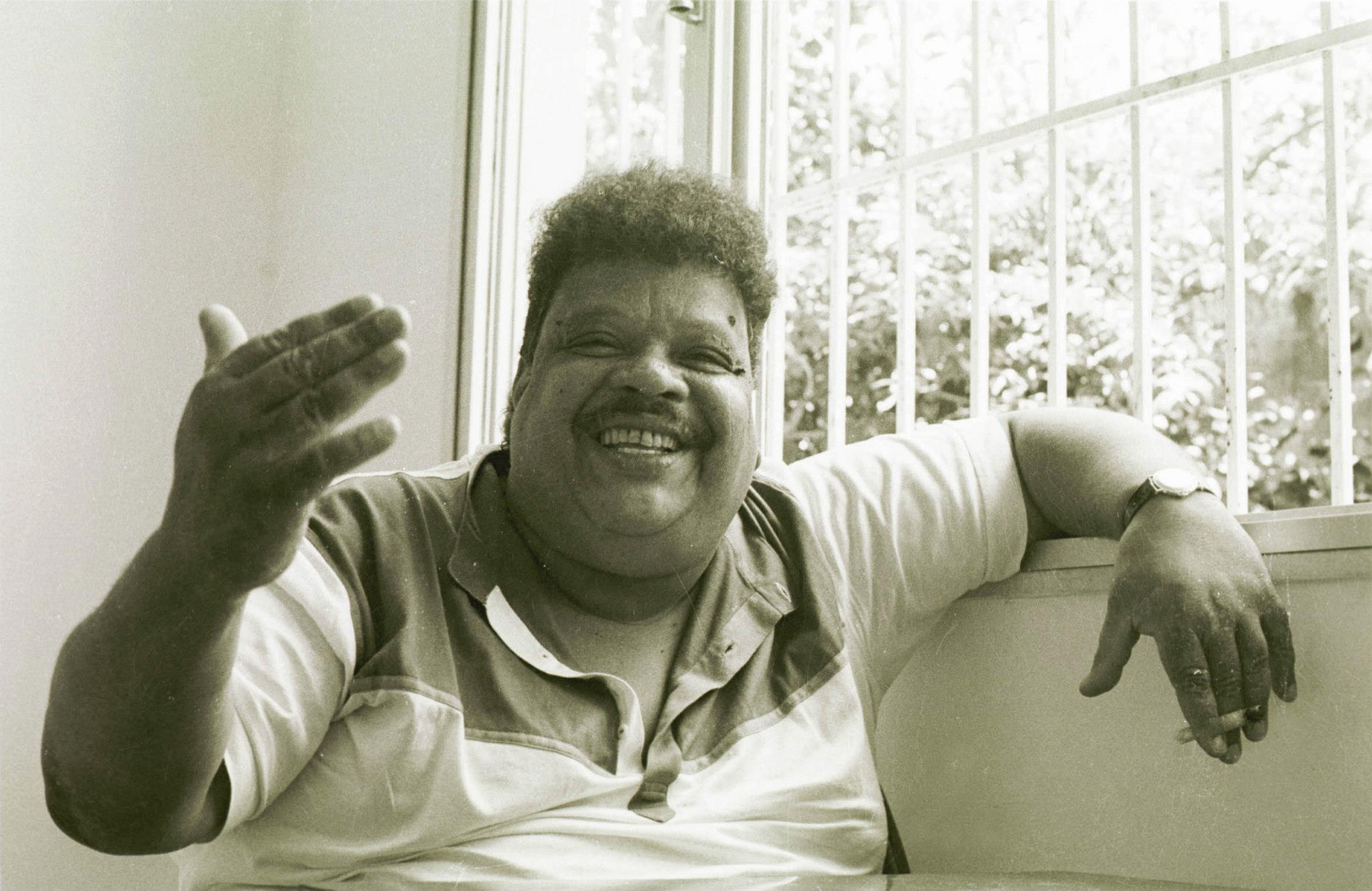
- Maia in 1987
- Born: Sebastião Rodrigues Maia; 28 September 1942; Rio de Janeiro, Brazil
- Died: 15 March 1998 (aged 55); Niterói, Brazil
- Other name: Síndico
- Occupations: Singer; songwriter; musician
- Children: 3
- Relatives: Ed Motta (nephew)
- Musical career
- Genres: MPB; samba rock; soul; funk; samba funk; disco; R&B; bossa nova
- Instruments: Vocals; guitar; drums; flute
- Years active: 1956–1998
- Labels: Som Livre; Polydor; Seroma; Vitória Régia Discos
- Website: timmaia.com.br

Sebastião "Tim" Rodrigues Maia (Brazilian Portuguese: [tʃĩ ˈmajɐ]; 28 September 1942 – 15 March 1998) was a Brazilian musician, songwriter, and businessman known for his iconoclastic, ironic, outspoken, and humorous musical style. Maia contributed to Brazilian music within a wide variety of musical genres, including soul, funk, disco, rock and roll, rhythm and blues, romantic ballads, samba, bossa nova, baião and música popular brasileira (MPB). He introduced the soul style on the Brazilian musical scene. Along with Jorge Ben, Maia pioneered samba rock and samba funk, combining samba, soul, funk and rock and roll. He is recognized as one of the biggest icons in Brazilian music.

Maia recorded numerous albums and toured extensively in a long career. He has won thirteen Brazilian Music Awards. After his death in 1998, his recorded oeuvre has shown enduring popularity. A theatrical retrospective of his career, the popular musical Vale Tudo, was first staged in Rio de Janeiro in 2012.

== Biography ==
=== 1950s ===
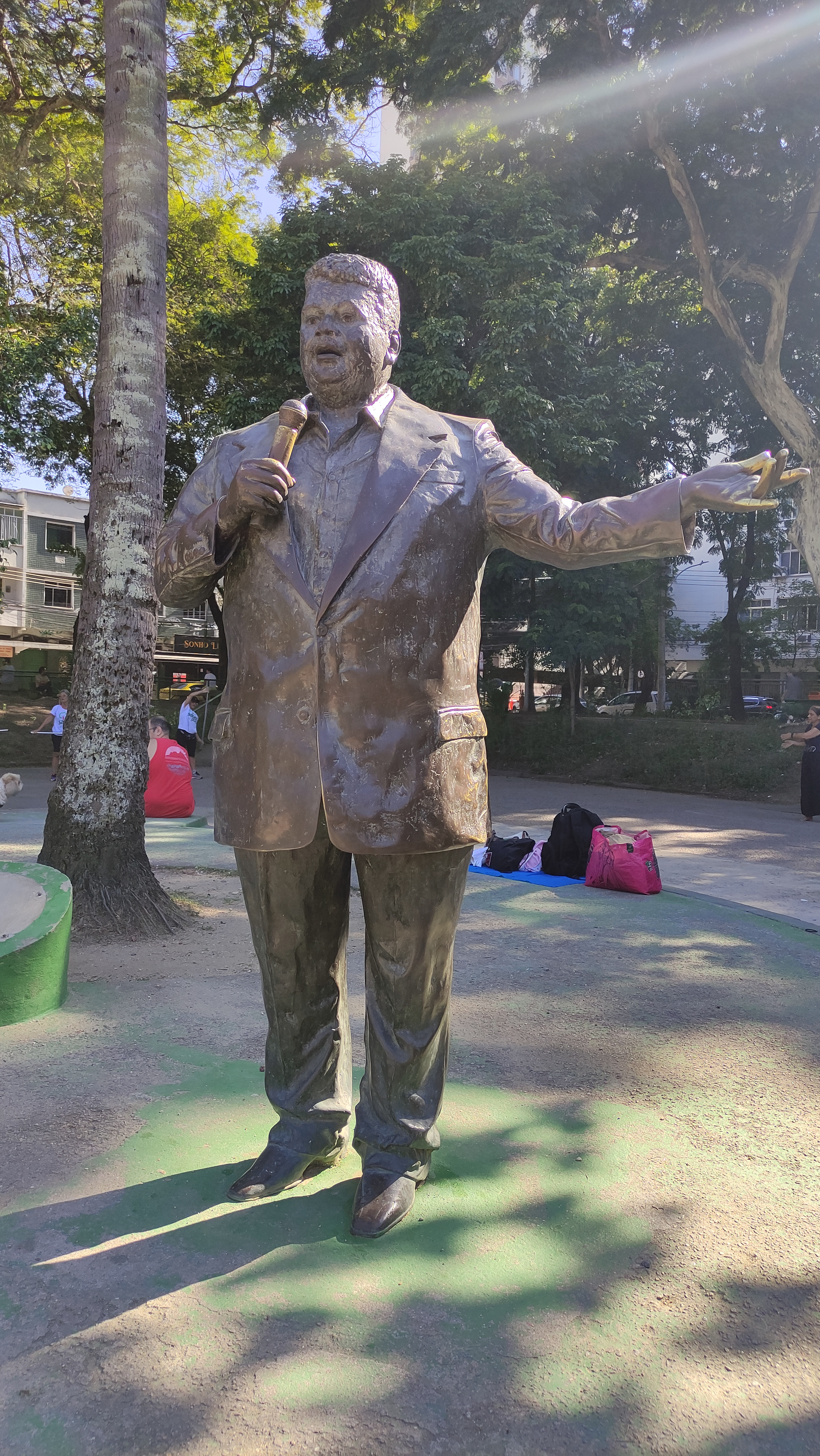
Tim Maia's statue in Tijuca, Rio de Janeiro.

Maia was born on 28 September 1942, in the Tijuca neighbourhood, in the north zone of Rio de Janeiro. He was the second youngest of nineteen children and began writing melodies at age eight, when he was known as "Tião Maia". At fourteen, as a drummer, he formed the group Os Tijucanos do Ritmo, which lasted one year. He took guitar classes and was teaching other children in Tijuca. He gave lessons to his friends Erasmo Esteves and Roberto Carlos, fellow members of the so-called Matoso Gang. Named after the street where they used to hang out, the gang also included Jorge Ben, among others. They liked to listen to the earliest styles of rock and roll, with both Maia and Ben being nicknamed "Babulina" after their enthusiastic pronunciation of Ronnie Self's rockabilly song "Bop-A-Lena". They both also liked Little Richard.

In 1957, Maia, Carlos, Arlênio Silva, Edson Trindade and Wellington started the vocal group The Sputniks. After a televised appearance on Carlos Imperial's Clube do Rock on TV Tupi, Imperial arranged a solo appearance for Roberto Carlos the following week. Maia got annoyed at this, leading him to insult Carlos in the following rehearsals until his bandmate left the group. After watching Carlos' concert the following week, Maia left The Sputniks, and went after Imperial for a solo appearance. Imperial eventually suggested another artistic name, Tim, which Maia accepted with reservations.

In 1959, Maia went to study in the United States, where he lived for five years. He joined a vocal harmony ensemble, The Ideals, and wrote the lyrics to "New Love", which was recorded as a demo with guest percussion by Milton Banana. (Maia also recorded the song as a soloist in 1973). The group's career was derailed in 1963 when Maia was arrested for possession of marijuana and deported back to Brazil.

=== 1960s ===
After returning, Maia had a few unsuccessful jobs and arrests in Rio. Eventually he decided to move to São Paulo to try to get help to kickstart his musical career from Carlos, who was beginning to enjoy the massive success of Jovem Guarda with Esteves. Carlos was inaccessible, but Maia started to perform in São Paulo's nightlife and in Wilson Simonal's radio program, and also had a televised appearance at TV Bandeirantes with Os Mutantes. By the end of 1967 Maia managed to send a homemade recording to Carlos, who got Maia a deal for a single at CBS and an appearance on the Jovem Guarda TV program. His first single in 1968, "Meu País" backed by "Sentimento", went unnoticed, as was another single, "These Are the Songs"/"What Do You Want to Bet?", recorded in English for RGE Discos. Maia also wrote one of Carlos' hits, "Não Vou Ficar". He became more visible after 1969 when he launched his "These Are the Songs", which was re-recorded by Elis Regina in the next year in a duo with Maia. Later that year, Maia signed a deal with Polydor/Philips and recorded the successful single "Primavera".

=== 1970s ===
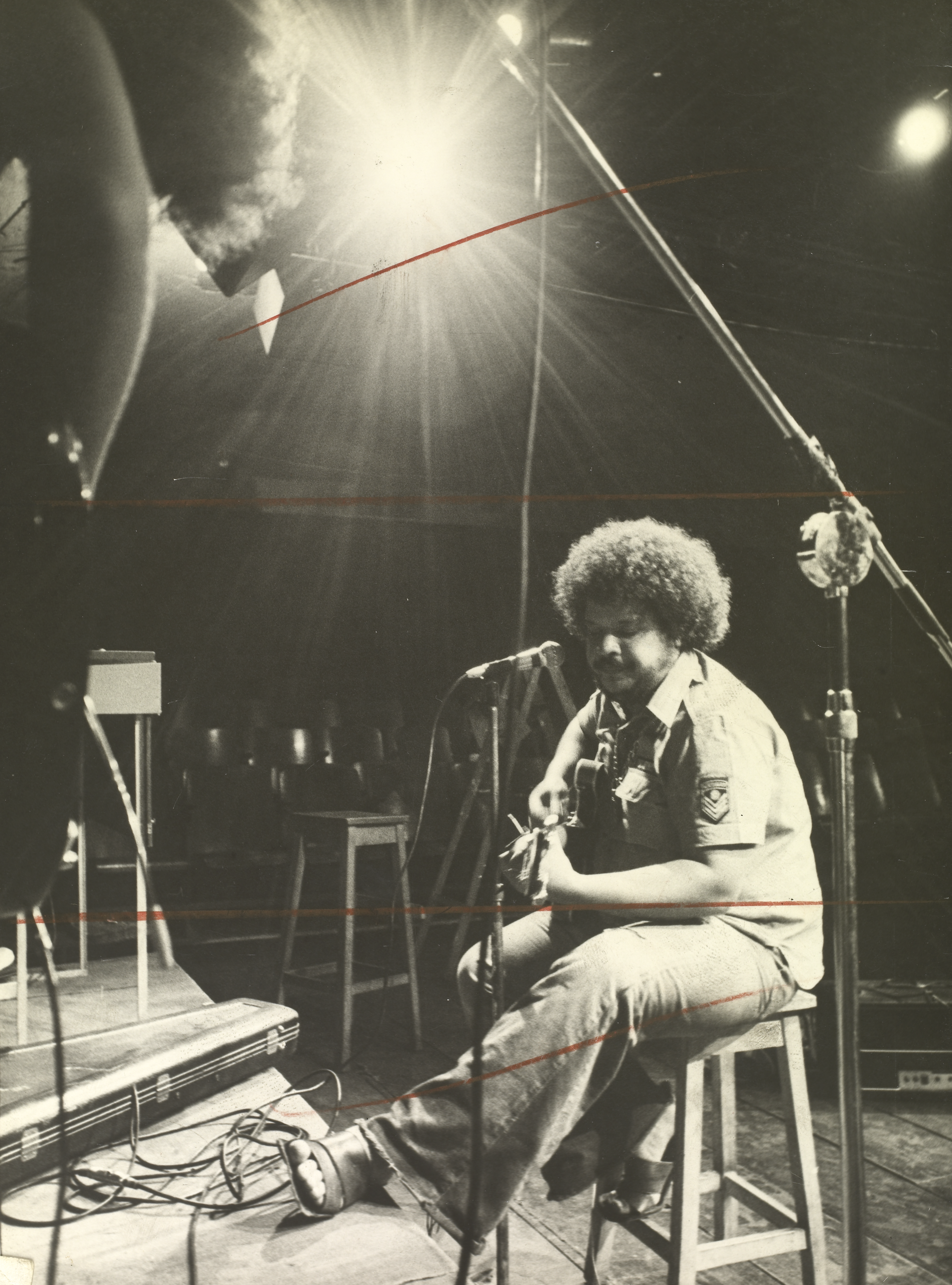
Tim Maia, 1972. National Archives of Brazil.

In the 1970s, Maia started to record albums and perform shows promoting his synthesis of American soul and Brazilian music with elements of samba and baião. The movement gradually took the working-class suburbs of the north side of Rio de Janeiro, exploding in 1976 with the black movement.

In 1970, Maia recorded his first full-length LP, Tim Maia, which included the classics "Azul da Cor do Mar", "Coroné Antônio Bento", and "Primavera", and topped the charts for 24 weeks in Rio de Janeiro. His first four albums were all self-titled. Next year's Tim Maia had other hits including "Não Quero Dinheiro (Só Quero Amar)" and "Preciso Aprender a Ser Só". His fourth album, released in 1973, included "Réu Confesso" and "Gostava Tanto de Você". Angry at how the music publisher distributed the royalties, Maia opened his own, Seroma (derived from the first syllables of his first, middle and last names), to make sure he had a bigger cut of the profits.

After his fourth album, Maia left Polydor for RCA Victor, who offered him a chance to record a double album. The instrumental parts were all ready when Maia went to his composing friend Tibério Gaspar for help with the lyrics. In his house Maia found the book Universo em Desencanto (Universe In Disenchantment), revolving around the cult of Rational Culture. Maia converted to the cult, abandoned drugs and red meat, and decided to write the lyrics for the songs about the knowledge contained in the book. RCA rejected the albums Tim Maia Racional, Vols. 1 & 2 for the newly found spiritual content, but Maia bought the master tapes from them and released the albums independently through label Seroma Discos, which would split its profits with the cult. While the lead single "Que Beleza (Imunização Racional)" had some airplay, at the time these records were not well received, due to inadequate distribution, and the spiritual content alienating both the radios and Maia's fans. Eventually, the artist could only perform at events promoted by the Rational Culture. In 1975, Maia got fed up with the cult, destroyed the unsold records and went back to his carefree life. The Racional albums are now regarded as classics and saw re-release in 2005.

For his return in 1976, Maia signed with Polygram and recorded an album also titled Tim Maia, which included the hit "Rodésia" (inspired by the Rhodesian Bush War), and also did a self-published album in English. In 1977 Maia signed with Som Livre, where he recorded the album Verão Carioca. In 1978 Maia signed with Warner Bros. Records and incorporated the disco sound of the period in the album Tim Maia Disco Club, which spawned the hits "Sossego" and "Acenda o Farol". In 1979 Maia recorded Reencontro for EMI-Odeon, but revolted at the label's estimated promotion costs which were the same as the money spent recording, Maia fought with the marketing executive, and in response EMI president fired Maia, releasing the album with no publicity to low sales.

=== 1980s and 1990s ===
In 1980, Maia recorded another self-titled album for Polygram. The following year, with turbulent passages through all the major labels in Brazil, Maia released again through Seroma the album Nuvens, which flopped due to inefficient distribution. To earn cash for his future albums, Maia was a guest in songs by Fevers, Edu Lobo and Chico Buarque, Ivan Lins and Sandra de Sá. His collaboration with Sá, "Vale Tudo", later became a solo hit for Maia. In 1983 he had hits with "O Descobridor dos Sete Mares" and "Me Dê Motivo", included on O Descobridor dos Sete Mares (Polygram). Another milestone of his career in the 1980s was Tim Maia (1986), which had the hit "Do Leme ao Pontal (Tomo Guaraná, Suco de Caju, Goiabada Para Sobremesa)".

In 1990, Maia saw Caetano Veloso's songbook and asked editor Almir Chediak to do one for his own work. Chediak was working on such an album with bossa nova classics, and Maia requested a copy, which eventually inspired him to do a self-released album of bossa nova covers, Tim Maia Interpreta Clássicos da Bossa Nova. After a period of poor presence in the media, he was again on top after being mentioned by Jorge Ben Jor's "W/Brasil" in 1991. In the same period, Maia had another hit with his re-recording of Lulu Santos' "Como uma Onda" for a television advertisement – Santos in return recorded Maia's "Descobridor dos Sete Mares.

At the same time, he withdrew from majors, recording his next albums through Vitória Régia, including What a Wonderful World (1997), where he recorded American pop/soul classics, and Amigos do Rei/Tim Maia e Os Cariocas, with the famous vocal group. Obese and in bad health, on 8 March 1998, he was performing at the Municipal Theater of Niterói when he became ill. He was hospitalized for a week, and died at 13:03 BRT on 15 March. Maia was interred at the São Francisco Xavier Cemetery in Caju.

== Personal life ==
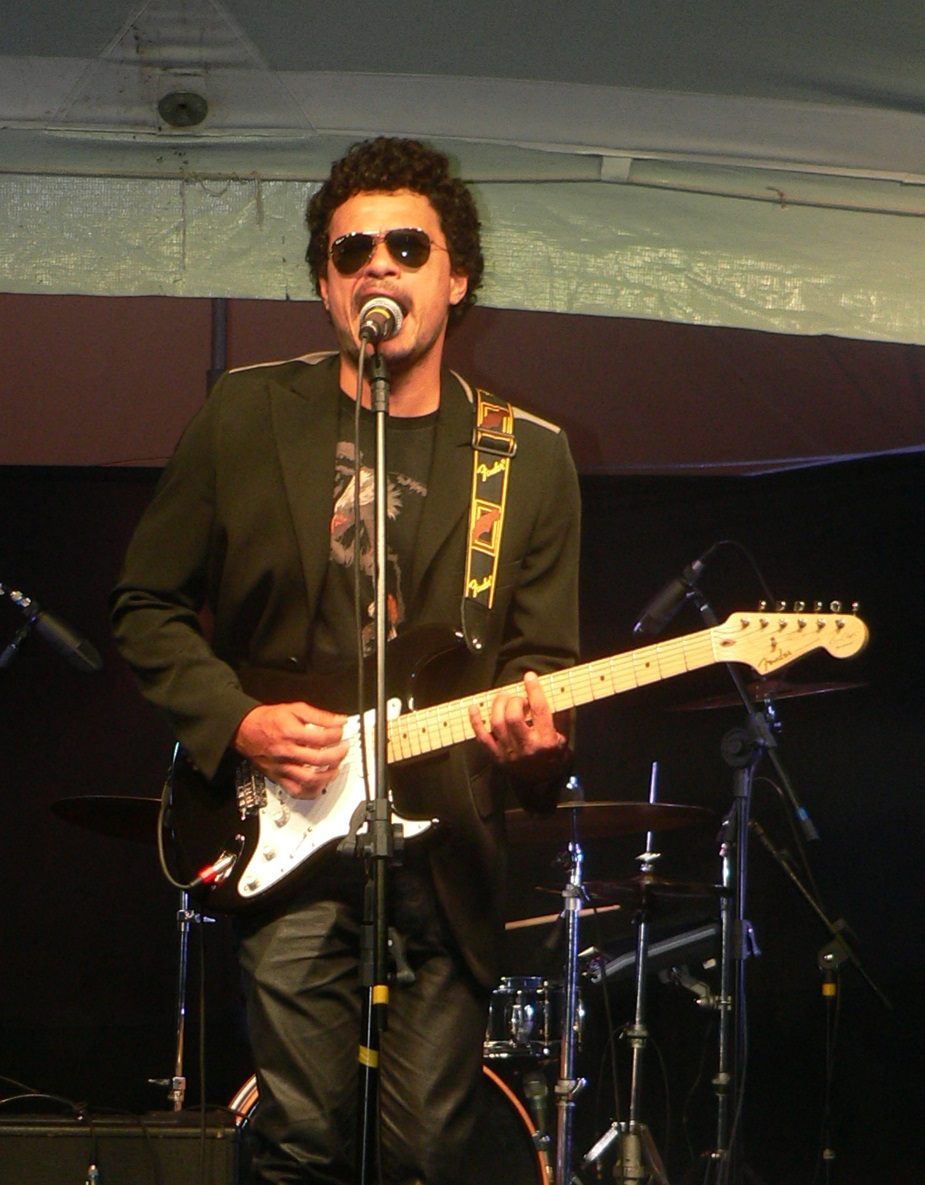
Léo Maia, Tim's adoptive son, also became a musician.

Maia lived in the United States of America from 1959 to 1964. He first resided in Tarrytown, New York, with the family of an acquaintance of his father's customer. There he learned English and did not speak much Portuguese because so few Brazilians were living in the US at the time. In 1961, Maia moved to New York City, and, in late 1963, with a group of three friends, decided to travel to the Southern United States. With a stolen car and performing small thefts to finance the journey (which got him arrested five times), Maia and friends traveled through nine states before arriving in Florida. In Daytona Beach, Maia had his final imprisonment for marijuana possession, which led to his deportation back to Brazil.

He had three sons. The first was José Carlos da Silva Nogueira (b. 1966). Maia only met Nogueira when he was already 15. Maia never legally recognized Nogueira as a son, but the two reportedly had a good relationship. A sister of Maia claims that, once he found out about Nogueira, he allowed the boy to live in one of his properties and helped him financially. Nogueira was shot and killed in 2002, in Barra da Tijuca, Rio de Janeiro, four years after Maia's death.

Maia had a live-in girlfriend, Maria de Jesus "Geisa" Gomes da Silva. After some time together, they broke up. When they made up, she was pregnant with a boy, whose father refused to recognize the child as his. Maia then adopted the boy, Marcio Leonardo "Léo" Maia (b. 1974). Afterwards, Maia and Geisa married and had another son, Carmelo "Telmo" Maia (b. 1975). When Léo was 12, Tim Maia and Geisa divorced.

Tim Maia became a member of the Brazilian Socialist Party (Partido Socialista Brasileiro – PSB) in October 1997. He was rumoured to have joined the party in order to run for a seat in the Federal Senate for Rio de Janeiro in the 1998 general elections, but died before that. When asked by a reporter why he chose to join the then small PSB, he replied: "Brazil is the only country where: whores fall in love, pimps get jealous, drug dealers become addicted and the poor vote for the right-wing". His phrase would become a famous aphorism on the way Brazilians face politics.

He was also known for his easygoing lifestyle and his habit of lightheartedly missing appointments and even important gigs. Indeed, Maia had a tradition of arriving late at concerts and at times missed them altogether. He also frequently complained about the sound quality in them. Many of his missed concerts were due to what he called his "triathlon"—consuming whiskey, cocaine, and marijuana before a gig. Towards the end of his life, Tim Maia suffered from many health problems, which included diabetes, acute hypertension, obesity and pulmonary embolism. In 1996, he had a Fournier gangrene solved through an emergency operation.

== Legacy and homages ==
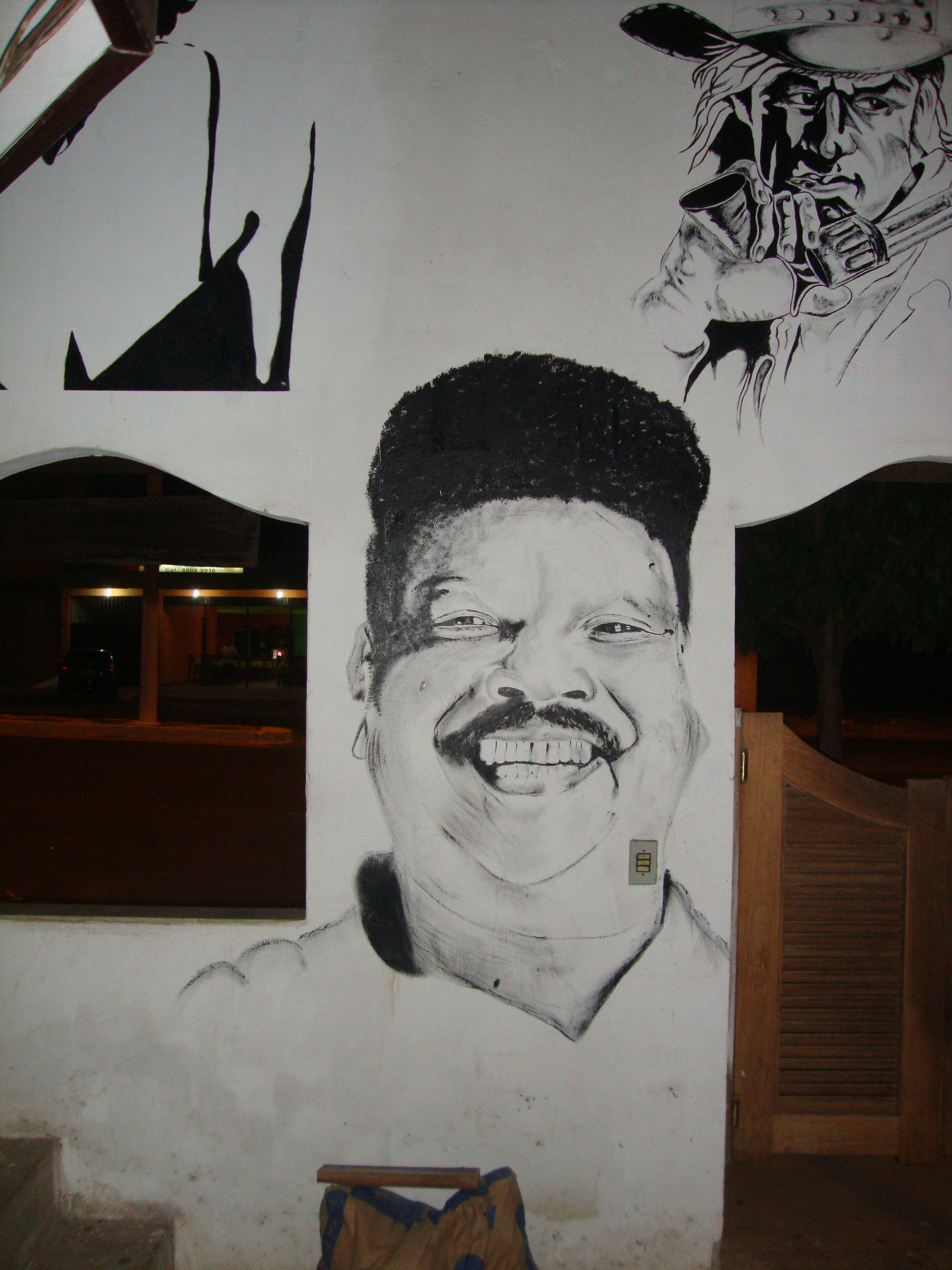
Caricature of Tim Maia.

After his death, Maia was the subject of numerous tributes by Música popular brasileira artists; two lavish commemorations in 1999 and 2000 were each released on CD and DVD. A biography, Vale Tudo – O Som e a Fúria de Tim Maia, was published in 2011 by one of Maia's personal friends, Nelson Motta. Motta later worked with João Fonseca on a stage version of the book – their musical retrospective Tim Maia: Vale Tudo began a successful theatrical run in Rio de Janeiro in 2012. The film adaptation Tim Maia based on the book was released in 2014.

In 2004, Som Livre released an album of posthumous duets entitled Soul Tim: Duetos. Maia's entire discography, including the never before seen third volume of Tim Maia Racional, was reissued by Editora Abril in 2011. In October 2012, American record label Luaka Bop released a Maia compilation entitled Nobody Can Live Forever.

In January 2001, Guns N' Roses guitarist Robin Finck sang "Sossego" during the Rock in Rio III festival. In 2007, TV Globo recorded a special program about Maia, Por Toda a Minha Vida, and in 2009, Globo had an episode of its show Som Brasil with Maia's songs, performed by his son Léo and Seu Jorge among other artists. TV Cultura (São Paulo's public broadcasting) released in 2012 Tim Maia's 1992 episode on YouTube of their Ensaio music program. Posthumously, an unprecedented album was released on digital platforms entitled "Yo Te Amo", which brings the musician's hits sung in Spanish and arrives 51 years after his original recording, made in 1970.

In September 2025, Joeveno released "BRAZILIAN DRUG DEALER 3: I OPENED A PORTAL TO HELL IN THE FAVELA TRYING TO REVIVE MIT AIA I NEED TO CLOSE IT" on Steam and the character of "Mit Aia" seems to be a direct reference to the singer.^{[Citations needed]}

== Discography ==
Maia released his first album in 1970 and recorded frequently throughout his career. The following is a representative list drawn from his extensive catalog:

- Tim Maia (1970)
- Tim Maia (1971)
- Tim Maia (1972)
- Tim Maia (1973)
- Racional (1975)
- Racional, vol.2 (1976)
- Tim Maia (1976)
- Tim Maia (1977)
- Tim Maia Disco Club (1978)
- Tim Maia (1978)
- Reencontro (1979)
- Tim Maia (1980)
- Nuvens (1982)
- O Descobridor dos Sete Mares (1983)
- Sufocante (1984)
- Tim Maia (1985)
- Tim Maia (1986)
- Somos América (1987)
- Carinhos (1988)
- Dance Bem (1990)
- Tim Maia Interpreta Clássicos da Bossa Nova (1990)
- Sossego (1991)
- Não Quero Dinheiro (1993)
- Romântico (1993)
- Voltou Clarear (1994)
- Tim Maia Ao Vivo (1995)
- Nova Era Glacial (1995)
- Pro Meu Grande Amor (1997)
- Sorriso de Criança (1997)
- What a Wonderful World (1997)
- Amigos do Rei (1997)
- Só Você: Para Ouvir e Dançar (1997)
- Tim Maia Ao Vivo II (1998)
- Yo Te Amo (2021)
