= Lonnie D. Kliever =

- Born: 1932
- Died: 2004 (aged 71–72)
- Occupations: Professor, writer

Dr Lonnie D. Kliever (1932–2004) was chair of the Department of Religious Studies at Southern Methodist University (SMU).

== Early life ==
Kliever was born in Corn, Oklahoma, a small town in the southwestern part of the state, but spent most of his boyhood in Fort Worth. He suffered a severe childhood case of rickets (caused by a calcium deficiency), which stunted his growth; he stood well under 5 feet tall.

== Education ==
Kliever was educated at Hardin–Simmons University, Union Theological Seminary in New York, and Duke University, where he received a Ph.D. in Religion and Philosophy in 1963.

== Career ==
After spending a total of thirteen years teaching at three different institutions (University of Texas at El Paso, Trinity University in San Antonio, and the University of Windsor), he joined SMU's Department of Religious Studies in 1975 as professor and chair. He served two terms as chair, the first from 1975 through 1986 and the second from 1993 to 1999. During his twenty-nine-year career at SMU, he published four books on various theological and ethical topics, and wrote numerous articles and op-ed pieces. He received three of SMU's highest honors: the M Award, the Rotunda Teacher of the Year Award, and the Godbey Lecture Series Author's Award.

He was accomplished in traditional areas of religious study such as theology, ethics and philosophy of religion. One of his two most widely known books, The Shattered Spectrum: A Survey of Contemporary Theology (published in 1981), is an analysis of the proliferation of new theologies in the 1960s and 70s.

Kliever's expertise was on the rise of new religious movements, cults and sects. He explored the dynamics and underpinnings of the Unification Church community. He closely followed the siege of the Branch Davidian church near Waco in 1993 and was critical of the intervention by the federal government in the standoff. He was often sought for consultation by police and governmental agencies as they confronted issues related to new and little known religious communities.

In 1997, Dr. Kliever was consulted by local police about the Chen Tao ("True Way") religious movement in Garland, Texas, who were making final preparations for the fulfillment of their apocalyptic prediction that God would come and pick them up in a "flying saucer". Kliever's role in advising authorities was kept quiet by mutual agreement until the situation was resolved. It was in large part due to Kliever's advice that there was no over-escalation or over-reaction on the part of law enforcement in the hours preceding the predicted apocalypse, which police had viewed as a critical period of time when other groups had taken poison to kill themselves. His counsel was instrumental during the months before the events; he was given unprecedented access to the inner workings of the group, which provided clues that indicated to Kliever that the group's members were not dangerous to themselves or the community. Consultation with university professors of religion became a model for law enforcement's role when interacting with new religious movements and determining whether a religious group is likely to become violent.

Outside of academia, Kliever was best known for his role in exposing a massive scandal involving SMU's football program in 1986 and 1987. As SMU's faculty athletics representative from 1984 to 1987, Kliever started an investigation into the program after a former player alleged that players were being paid. He worked very closely with the NCAA, with whom he had already gained a reputation for integrity. He insisted that SMU cooperate fully with the NCAA investigators, resulting in the NCAA enforcement staff supporting his proposal to limit SMU to nine games in 1987 and 1988. While the infractions committee ultimately imposed the "death penalty" on SMU by shutting down the program for the 1987 season, it praised Kliever for the extensive and effective work he had done.

== Bibliography ==
=== Books ===
- Radical Christianity: The new theologies in perspective (1968) 282 pp. Droke House, ASIN B0006BUD1E
- Shattered Spectrum: A Survey of Contemporary Theology. (1981) John Knox Pr. ISBN 0-8042-0707-0
- The Terrible Meek: Religion and Revolution in Cross Cultural Perspective (1987). Washington Inst Pr. ISBN 0-88702-215-4
- Dax's Case: Essays in Medical Ethics and Human Meaning (1989) Ed. Southern Methodist Univ Pr; 1st ed. edition. ISBN 0-87074-277-9
- H. Richard Niebuhr (Makers of the Modern Theological Mind) (1991) 205pp. Hendrickson Publishers. ISBN 0-943575-65-6
- The reliability of apostate testimony about new religious movements. Freedom Publishing (1995) ASIN B0006QUW6A

=== Journal articles ===
- Kliever, Lonnie D.; Bergmann, Barbara R.; Weistart, John C.; Mason, Henry L. (January–February 1990). "The role of faculty in the governance of college athletics: A report of the special committee on athletics". Academe. 76 (1). American Association of University Professors: 43–47. doi:10.2307/40249664. JSTOR 40249664.
