= Chen Tao (UFO religion) =

Religious group that originated in 20th-century Taiwan

- 真道
- Type: New religious movement
- Classification: UFO religion
- Founder: Hon-Ming Chen (陳恆明)
- Origin: 1996; Taiwan
- Separated from: Soul Light Resurgence Association
- Other name: God's Salvation Church
- Official website: trueway-chentao.homepage.com (defunct)

Chen Tao (Chinese: 真道, or "True Way"), also known as the God's Salvation Church, was a UFO religion that originated in Taiwan in 1996. It was founded by Hon-Ming Chen, who split it from the Soul Light Resurgence Association that he and several others had previously founded. Members later moved to Texas in 1997, where they became notorious for a highly publicized failed millennial prophecy.

== Beliefs and practices ==
They were a UFO religion. They mainly called themselves God's Salvation Church, but also called themselves God Saves the Earth Flying Saucer Foundation, True Way Church, or Chen Tao. Members wore white clothes and cowboy hats, and wore cowboy boots. Members of the group called Chen "Teacher Chen".

== History ==
Hon-Ming Chen (Chinese: 陳恆明) was born 22 April 1955 in Chiayi, Taiwan. His mother died when he was young; Chen described his upbringing as not religiously devoted, with Buddhist parents and some observation of Chinese folk religion. He acquired a bachelors degree in political science and became an associate professor of sociology at Chia Nan University of Pharmacy and Science, where he taught until 1993. He had two daughters.

Throughout most of his life, Chen described himself as an atheist, but in 1992 he believed he received a revelation from God to live a devoted, religious life; he read a variety of religious texts, including the Christian Old and New Testaments, Buddhist sutras, and Tao Te Ching. He ultimately joined another UFO religion; he paid immense amounts of money to the leader of this group, before he declared that someone making money in God's name was sinful, and those that do so are actually devils in disguise. He then left the group and criticized its leader as demonic; many other members defected with him, and together they founded the Soul Light Resurgence Association (SLRA). Chen founded a church for the group, and encouraged a friend, Mao Tao Hung, to found his own. They grew from there throughout Taiwan, Chen being one of four teachers of the SLRA at four practice sites.

Chen began to conceive of North America as a "Pureland of God", and in 1996 self-published a book declaring his worldview, advising people who agreed with him to move to the United States to surviving an impending apocalypse. He attempted to convince members at all locations of the SLRA to move with him to America. Most did not follow him, but a few did, forming Chen Tao in 1996. When the group moved to the United States from Asia, it was registered in the US as God's Salvation Church and first relocated to San Dimas, California. Adherents moved to Garland, Texas, in 1997. The group moved to Garland because the name sounded like "God Land", with Chen claiming they had moved because the East was full of "devils and devil religions". Despite moving to the United States, he did not speak English and spoke to the public through an interpreter, Richard Liu. In 1997 they had 140–160 members. Members purchased more than 20 homes in an upper-middle-class south Garland neighborhood. Like their neighbors, these followers were white-collar professionals, some of whom were reportedly wealthy. "They dressed in white, wore cowboy hats and drove luxury cars," according to The Dallas Morning News.

== Failed prophecy ==
The group is best known for a highly publicized, and failed, millennial prophecy. Shortly after moving to Garland in August 1997, Chen declared in a press conference on 22 December 1997, that on March 31, 1998, God would manifest in physical form on his front lawn. He then made increasingly elaborate and extreme predictions, later declaring that a week prior to this appearance, God would manifest nationwide on Channel 18, in a form identical to Chen. He would then, Chen declared, set up an office and prepare people to survive the Seventh Great Tribulation; a worldwide nuclear apocalypse which would arrive in early 1999.

Most onlookers and reporters found it simply amusing, but some worried for the potential of an event like the Heaven's Gate mass suicide that had happened earlier that year. They were seen as more worrying than Heaven's Gate, due to Chen's often ominous claims and highly specific predictions. Chen denied this, saying they valued life too much to do such a thing. The Garland Police Department, understanding the potential gravity of the situation, coordinated resources, including religious studies professor Lonnie Kliever, and were on stand-by when the international media began arriving in what had previously been an upper-middle-class section of the Dallas suburb. "Its presence unsettled many Garland residents," wrote Adam Szubin in a law enforcement case study.

When the predicted appearance did not occur, the group became confused. "The Chen Tao leader announced that he obviously had misunderstood God's plans, and members quietly returned to their homes," wrote Szubin. Chen offered to be stoned or crucified for the prophecy's failure, but no one took him up on his offer.

== Aftermath ==
Unlike other millennial religious groups, such as Millerites, Chen Tao seems to have effectively fallen apart after its leader's prophecies went unfulfilled. Immediately after the failed prediction, some of the members had to return to Taiwan owing to visa problems; in total, roughly two-thirds abandoned the group. Later the remaining members moved to Lockport, New York. They continued to wear cowboy hats but began stating that a war between China and Taiwan would lead to a nuclear holocaust that would result in much death, but also God's arrival in a "God plane" to save the members. They originally stated that this would occur in 1999 but later revised the date.

Religious studies scholars Stuart A. Wright and Arthur L. Greil traveled to Lockport to interview Master Chen and observe the group post-prophecy.

== See also ==
- Doomsday cult
- List of UFO religions
