= Ernest Norman =

American new age spiritual leader

Ernest L. Norman
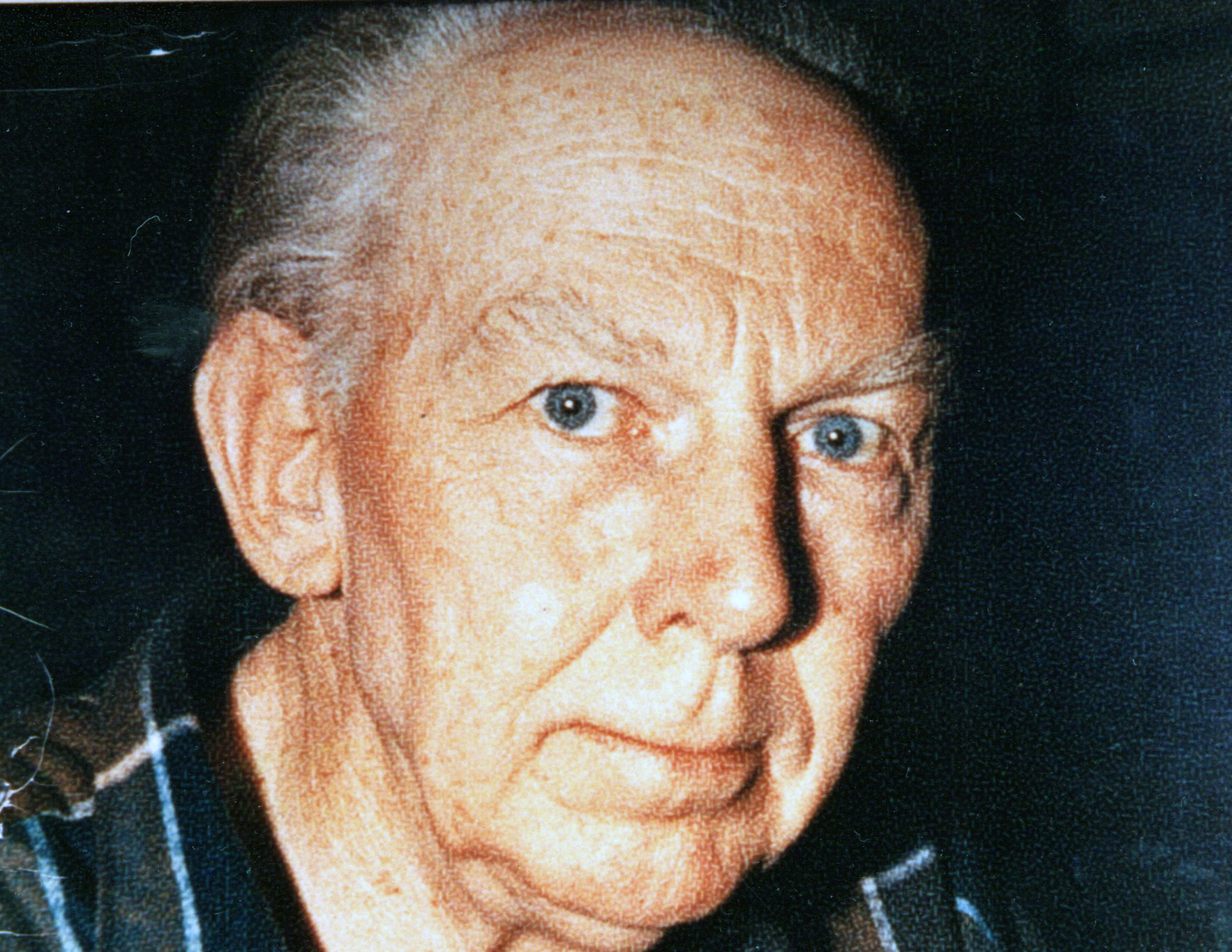
- Norman in 1970
- Born: November 11, 1904; Logan, Utah, US
- Died: December 6, 1971 (aged 67); Escondido, California, US
- Occupation(s): Religious leader, writer
- Known for: Co-founder of Unarius Academy of Science
- Spouses: Edris Wilson (1929–1954); Ruth E. Norman (1954–1971)

Ernest Leland Norman (November 11, 1904 – December 6, 1971) was an American spiritual leader and author best known for co-founding the Unarius Science of Life and the Unarius Educational Foundation, which later became known as the Unarius Academy of Science.

== Early life ==
Norman was born on November 11, 1904 in Logan, Utah. He was the fifth of eight children born to Bernt Andreas Norman, a Norwegian immigrant, and Elsie Mitton Norman, born in Utah to English immigrants. He claimed to having been a child prodigy, who at age 7 constructed his first microscope using parts from his telescope, and was very good at math as a teenager. At age 17, Norman and his family moved to California, where he took evening classes. In 1929 he married Edris Nellie Wilson. They gave birth to a son, Ernest Leland Norman Jr. in 1932. It was during this time when Norman began to experiment with clairvoyance, palmistry, and fortune telling.

Before starting the grassroots work for Unarius, Norman worked for the Borderlands Sciences Research Association as a contributing editor for the Round Robin journal, and also worked as a minister for a spiritualist church for 15 years.

== Unarius Science of Life ==
In February 1954, Norman met his future wife, Ruth E. Norman at a spiritualist convention in Los Angeles. They claim that at this convention a clairvoyant noticed three white bearded men following Norman with massive books. Ernest and Ruth claimed these were the spirits of Elisha, Ezra, and Enoch carrying the books that Ernest was going to write in his current lifetime.

After their initial meeting at the convention, Norman "channeled" and wrote a book on poetry and prose called The Elysium (published in 1956), which would later be followed by its sequel, The Anthenium (published in 1964). With Ruth's assistance, Norman gave a 12-week lecture called "Pathway to the Stars" in Los Angeles, where he described in detail how energy functions, what he saw in the celestial worlds, psychic protection, and parapsychology. In this lecture, Norman claimed that the people of planet Earth were being guided and watched over by a large fraternal brotherhood called Unarius, which was formerly known as Shamballah or the White Brotherhood on Earth, and that any human being could make contact with these "Higher Beings" (sometimes also called Space Brothers, "Brothers", or "Brothers of the Light") because everyone is capable of using psychic abilities. Eventually, the Pathway to the Stars lecture course was compiled with further articles and printed as a book entitled the Infinite Concept of Cosmic Creation. The new articles, which included an advanced course based on the initial Pathway to the Stars lecture, further detailed the interdimensional science that Ernest Norman was trying to convey during his lecture series.

It was during this time Norman took on the moniker of the Unarius Moderator, or simply the Moderator. Unarius was officially formed as a nonprofit corporation in the state of California in 1957, as the Unarius - Science of Life.

The Normans and their students put together a series of testimonials of various past-life relivings and spiritual healing that they claimed had occurred because of their tutelage under Ernest Norman. One such claim included that Norman was on Earth in ancient Jerusalem as Jesus, and his students had been his followers and enemies, reincarnated once more to heal themselves of the karma they accumulated in that lifetime.

Students also believed that Norman was overshadowed by an Archangel named Raphiel in his earthly incarnations on Earth and in previous lifetimes in other worlds. Archangel Raphiel should not be confused with the biblical Archangel Raphael, as the title of "Archangel" within the vernacular of Unarius means "Supreme Master", and the name Raphiel is an acronym for "“Radiant Absolute Pure Healing Infinite Eternal Light”. The Unariun Archangel Raphiel is part of a hierarchy of Higher Beings who oversee the development of the universe, but do not surpass "God" (called the Infinite Creative Intelligence). The revelations of the Archangels came about when Ruth E. Norman took over as leader of Unarius.

== Death ==
Norman died on December 6, 1971.

== Bibliography ==
Ernest Norman wrote twenty books in his lifetime that covered theoretical physics, spirituality, philosophy, theology, extraterrestrial life, sociology, and poetry. Norman also authored articles further emphasizing the interdimensional hypothesis he was trying to teach, and answered letters from his students that have been archived at the Unarius Academy of Science.

The first book he wrote, The Truth About Mars, gives an account of Norman meeting the Martian ambassador, a being named Nur El, and traveling to the underground cities of Mars in his astral body.

- Truth About Mars
- The Infinite Concept of Cosmic Creation
- Infinite Perspectus
- Tempus Invictus
- Tempus Procedium
- Tempus Interludium Vol. 1
- Tempus Interludium Vol. 11 (Featuring Atoms to Astronauts)
- Cosmic Continuum
- Infinite Contact
- Voice of Venus (1956)
- Voice of Eros
- Voice of Hermes
- Voice of Orion
- Voice of Muse, Elysium, Unarius
- Little Red Box

=== Poetry ===
- The Elysium (1956)
- The Anthenium (1964)

== See also ==
- New Age Spirituality
- Spiritism
- Theosophy
- Biocentrism
- Fourth Dimension
- Quantum Physics
- Metaphysics
- Multiverse
- Ontology
- List of people who have claimed to be Jesus
