= Sunburst (community) =

Spiritual community in California

- Sunburst Sanctuary
- Formation: 1969
- Headquarters: Santa Barbara, California
- Director: Patricia Paulsen
- Key people: Norman Paulsen

Sunburst, also known as Brotherhood of the Sun, is an intentional community founded in 1969 by Norman Paulsen in Santa Barbara, California. Sunburst began in the late 1960s, inspired by an idea for self-sustaining World Brotherhood Colonies envisioned by Paramahansa Yogananda, the Indian yogi and author of the 1946 book Autobiography of a Yogi and founder of Self-Realization Fellowship. It was founded and led by Norman Paulsen, one of the direct disciples of Paramahansa Yogananda. Paulsen's doctrine has been defined as a syncretic religion which incorporates alternative spiritual beliefs and ideas brought form ufology, theosophy, esoteric Christianity, Hopi traditions, Kriya yoga, and meditation. Over a span of twenty-five years, Sunburst found its permanent home on the 4,000-acre Sunburst Sanctuary, approximately twenty minutes south of Lompoc, California. Scattered throughout these hills are residences of members who live on the ranch. Norman Paulsen died in 2006. After the founder's death, his widow Patricia Paulsen became the spiritual leader of Sunburst.

== Early Sunburst ==
Norman Paulsen, who started the Sunburst community in the late 1960s as a small group, was a direct disciple of Paramahansa Yogananda, author of the 1946 spiritual classic, Autobiography of a Yogi. Their teachings were described as a mixture of mysticism, Christianity, and the practice of Kriya yoga. The group also incorporated Hopi symbolism into their ceremonies. The group met in a trailer in Santa Barbara to practice meditation. When they outgrew that location, they moved to an old ice cream factory.

Paulsen's book, Life, Love, God: Story of a Soul Traveler, explains his concept of Self-realization, his idea that at the core of every human being is a pure Self, a consciousness of Christ, and the realization of this Self is attained through the practice of meditation.

In 1971, Sunburst bought 150 acres north of Santa Barbara on Gibraltar Road. There they began raising organic vegetables, the enterprise that would become their main source of revenue through the years. They operated a small café called Farmer and the Fisherman, a juice factory, a bakery, and a wholesale warehouse from which they shipped organic food all over the country.

Also In 1971, the group bought the Ogilvy Ranch approximately 150 acres (0.61 km^{2}) north of Santa Barbara and renamed it Lemuria. At one time, the Lemuria property grew wheat, corn, and vegetables. Sunburst members planted orchards and vineyards and used Percheron horses to pull their plows. Goats provided milk and cheese; bee hives provided honey. Lemuria even had a blacksmith and a school for members’ children.

In 1974, the Los Angeles Times published a feature article about the founder and his organic farming business. The Times said the following about the community, the office, a converted ice cream factory, is headquarters for a unique brotherhood and business that includes four ranches, three organic food markets, a bakery, two restaurants, a trucking service, and a 158-foot (48 m) sailing-vessel being restored at San Pedro.

During their early years, they referred to themselves as the “Brotherhood of the Sun.”

Sunburst members practiced a holistic lifestyle based on meditation, living from the land, organic farming, and an eightfold path.

Part of this was documented by two members of the group, Dusk and Willow Weaver. The married couple's joint journal won the “Best Non-Fiction Award” at the Santa Barbara Writers Conference and was later published by AVANT Books in 1982 with the title Sunburst: A People, A Path, A Purpose.

By the late 1970s, internal disagreements led to the Sunburst community losing members. This in turn caused financial constraints that led to the California property being sold, and some members moved to Big Springs Ranch in Northeastern Nevada and later Salt Lake City, where they began natural foods businesses.

In 1996, Sunburst returned to California's central coast with the purchase of Sunburst Sanctuary.
