= Antrovis =

Polish UFO religion

- The Antrovis symbol
- Type: New religious movement
- Classification: UFO religion
- Region: Poland; Germany
- Headquarters: Wrocław, Poland
- Founder: Edward Mielnik
- Origin: 1980s Wrocław
- Defunct: 1994
- Other names: International Centre for the Restoration of Mankind and Earth "Antrovis"

The International Centre for the Restoration of Mankind and Earth "Antrovis" (Polish: Międzynarodowe Centrum Odnowy Ludzi i Ziemi „Antrovis”), commonly known as Antrovis, was a new religious movement, referred to as a UFO religion, active in the 1980s and 1990s in Poland. It was founded in Wrocław by an energy medicine practitioner Edward Mielnik.

== History ==
Edward Mielnik worked as a high-pressure boilers stoker. He started practicing energy medicine and founded the Antrovis cult in the 1980s. The provincial court of Wrocław registered Antrovis as a religious association.

Aside from Wrocław, Antrovis was also active in the cities of Warsaw, Kraków, Katowice, Poznań, Szczecin, and Polanica-Zdrój, and among Polish diaspora in Germany. Antrovis started publishing their periodical Nowy kosmos in 1993. They also published books. By 1994, the cult numbered 42 official members, but its courses were attended by about six hundred people. Among members and associates of Antrovis were politician Barbara Labuda, journalist Zygmunt Broniarek, and actors Emilian Kamiński and Krystyna Sienkiewicz.

The Antrovis association was officially dissolved in 1994, following Mielnik's disappearance. Despite this, it was alleged by the press and organizations monitoring cult activities that Antrovis did not cease its activities, and that it was still recruiting new members as of 2016. In 2000, a personal development coach in Częstochowa was accused of trying to recruit people into Antrovis under the guise of a self-development seminar.

== Ideology ==
Antrovis combined "faith in the sanctity of Slavic nations" with ufology and Christianity. Edward Mielnik's ideas were influenced by Helena Blavatsky's writings, the theory of ancient astronauts, science fiction literature, millenarianism, and Polish messianism. He also held antisemitic sentiments. The cult's beliefs were noted to be similar to that of the Heaven's Gate movement.

According to Mielnik, Slavs from the planet of Atlanta settled in the territory of modern Poland about eight billion years ago. The Slavs were guardians of the "canon of twelve universal laws". At the same time, Hebrews, referred to as "guardians of free will", also came to Earth from the planet of Hebra. The conflict between the Slavs and the Hebrews lead to a "destruction of the current world structure based on the twelve universal laws". The current civilization was the seventh and last of Earth civilization. In 1999, the era was supposed to end with a series of cataclysms. 144 thousand Poles would survive the catastrophe and be taken from the Ślęża mountain to the planet of Mirinda by alien spaceships. By the start of 2000, nations would unite under the leadership of Poles.

The cult also claimed that Pope John Paul II would be assassinated and that the growth of space radiation would spread skin disease. Both of those events were supposed to happen in 1994.

== Controversies ==
Antrovis's activities sparked considerable controversy, and the movement was labeled a cult. It recruited young people, including teenagers, much to the outrage of parents and the public. In August 1993, a sixteen year old boy went missing after Antrovis members presumably convinced him of an ongoing evacuation into space. According to Polish Police, two more people connected to the cult also went missing. There were also cases of "mutilations and refusal of treatment" by members of Antrovis, according to the Ministry of the Interior and Administration's report.

One follower of Antrovis was found dead with his genitals missing. It was alleged that he was murdered by the cult, as they believed "human organs will be needed by aliens as spare parts" and that "genitals are batteries that will power the evacuation vehicles". The police investigated the murder, but had no success in identifying the killers. The media also accused the cult of organ harvesting.

In 2006, Ryszard Nowak, leader of the National Committee for Defense Against Cults, published a "Report about cults", where he placed Antrovis on a list of sixteen sects active in Poland. The report was criticized by information centers on cults and new religious movements, noting that Antrovis has not been active for several years.
