= Arnaldo Saccomani =

Brazilian record producer (1949–2020)

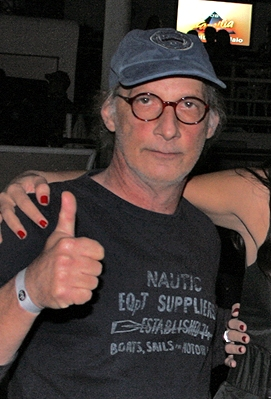
Arnaldo Saccomani

Arnaldo Saccomani (August 24, 1949 – August 27, 2020) was a Brazilian music producer, multi-instrumentalist, and composer.
