= Rational Culture =

Brazilian UFO religion

Rational Culture (In Portuguese: Cultura Racional) is a Brazilian UFO religion derived from Umbanda, founded in 1935 in the city of Rio de Janeiro by the medium Manuel Jacinto Coelho.

Rational Culture is based on a series of books called Universo em Desencanto, a work that addresses a wide range of topics including cosmology, metaphysics, ecology, linguistics, theology, UFOs, and flying saucers.

== Origins ==
Rational Culture emerged on October 4, 1935, at the "Tenda Espírita Francisco de Assis" in Rio de Janeiro, Rua Lopez da Cruz, Méier.

During the early decades of the 20th century, persecution of Afro-Brazilian religions increased, with practitioners of these religious segments being pursued and monitored by the police, especially between 1930 and 1945. To escape this persecution and be accepted by society, especially the urban middle class, some Afro-Brazilian religions underwent a process of "de-Africanization" and whitening, in which they sought to differentiate themselves from the so-called "lower spiritism," viewed by this society as backward and uncultured, while also constructing a "rational legitimacy." For this purpose, a group known as the "Intellectuals of Umbanda" worked intensively to provide Umbanda with a doctrinal basis and written knowledge, thereby distinguishing it from the practices of "lower spiritism."

== Doctrine ==
Rational Culture emphatically presents the idea that its teachings should be found only in its books and that reading them is the path to "salvation," described in its writings as "Rational Immunization," with no need for methods other than sequential reading of the books.

=== Religiosity ===
Similar to how the author of Rational Culture distinguishes between "spiritism," dividing it into true and false, the same is done with the term "religion," differentiating it in his work between: true religion and false religion, or religion from above and religion from below. Also, Rational Culture initially denies its religious nature, claiming to be just transcendental knowledge.

=== Astral Planes ===
According to Rational Culture, the world is divided into four planes: the Rational World, Higher Astral, Lower Astral, and Terrestrial Astral.

==== Rational World ====
Inhabited by rational beings who have always existed in a rational state and readers of Universo em Desencanto, invisible and on other planets. Its inhabitants would be composed of Rational Energy, a pure, clean, and perfect energy. Located above the Higher Astral.

==== Higher Astral ====
Inhabited by beings who were unable to fully develop their reasoning, who manifest themselves as flying saucers. The Higher Astral plane, located above the Sun, above electric and magnetic energies, is formed by inhabitants generated by "Mediating Energy."

==== Lower Astral ====
Inhabited by beings who did not possess "rational conduct."

==== Terrestrial Astral ====
Inhabited by orishas, "the people of the ground and the people of the air."

=== Religions ===
Rational Culture recognizes seven main religions (Animism, Brahmanism, Buddhism, Islam, Judaism, Spiritism, and Christianity) responsible for the "confused evolution" and domestication of humanity. The founders of these religions would not be Buddha, Jehovah, or Jesus Christ, but rather beings inhabiting the lower astral.

==== Spiritism ====
Rational Culture discusses Spiritism in two ways: true spiritism and false spiritism. According to Rational Culture, true spiritism ceased its activities in 1935 and denies the legitimacy of spiritist mediums from that point onwards.

==== Umbanda ====
Although not recognized by Rational Culture's doctrine: once originating from Umbanda, Rational Culture continued as a branch of it, albeit with a new appearance and altered language, but with the same practices and customs, characterized by what became known among cult members as the "little room," where mediums incorporated entities and provided consultations for people, both members and non-members. These "little rooms" existed in various locations throughout the country, serving as gathering points for followers. It adopts the color of Umbanda's attire (white) and the greeting to eshus used in it.

It recognizes orishas as "the people of the ground and the people of the air," inhabitants of the Terrestrial Astral.

== Practices ==
=== Healing ===
Followers of Rational Culture practice healing through the use of herbs, oils, incense, candles, symbolic objects, reading the books, and chanting to summon entities from the Terrestrial Astral.

=== Palmistry ===
Followers of Rational Culture practice palmistry, the art of reading hands.

== History ==
After the publication of the book "Universo em Desencanto" in the mid-1930s, the religious movement continued in the following decades, having changed its headquarters from Méier to Jacarepaguá, then to Belford Roxo, where the Palácio da Cultura Racional was built.

In the 1970s, Rational Culture moved to its current headquarters in Nova Iguaçu, where it remains today. During this period, the religious movement began to be frequented by some artists, including musician Tim Maia, who brought significant visibility to the cult, leading it to its peak. During his time with Rational Culture, the singer recorded two albums that would later become critically acclaimed hits, both titled "Tim Maia Racional". In 2011, Editora Abril released a third unreleased album recorded by the singer in 1976. After leaving the cult, the singer stated:

I joined this cult, which promised to prepare me to communicate with extraterrestrial beings. [...] When I got there, I saw that it was Umbanda, Candomblé, lower spiritism.

Jackson do Pandeiro was another artist connected to Rational Culture between 1973 and 1978, recording songs in tribute to the group, such as "Luz do Saber," recorded in 1978.

The founder of the cult, Manuel Jacinto Coelho, died in 1991, and since then, Rational Culture has been led by one of his daughters.

== Band ==
Rational Culture has a series of musical bands spread across 14 Brazilian states. They are formed by members of the movement itself and have as their main goal the promotion of the books of Rational Culture. Called the "Rational Universe in Disenchantment Band" - BRUD, or the "Rational Union Band" - BUR (when all bands come together), the band emerged in 1982, initially as a fanfare with percussion and some brass instruments. Over time, it evolved into a marching band, incorporating more elaborate instruments. The band has national and international coverage, and in its repertoire, there are popular songs, military tunes, anthems, and original compositions.

In addition to the marching band, Rational Culture has a symphony orchestra, the Racional Jazz Band – RJB – created in 2016, featuring string instruments such as violins, cellos, basses, and electric guitars, keyboard instruments like piano and keyboard, etc., as well as woodwinds, brass, and percussion instruments.

== Honors ==
In recognition of its initiatives, the Day of Rational Culture was established in more than one hundred and forty-five cities.

Manuel Jacinto Coelho, the founder of Rational Culture, also received honors in recognition of his work. Holding several titles, medals, and national and international awards, some of which include: Tiradentes Medal, Title of Benefactor of the State of Rio de Janeiro, Honorary Medal of Inconfidência, Hipólito José Costa Commendation, Dr. Newton Cardoso Silver Plaque, honorary citizenship of Iguaçu, Citizen of Friburgo, Peace Grove Square in the state of Minas Gerais.

== Bibliography ==
- Cavalcante Modesto da Silva, Alire Cristina (2013). Cultura racional: da raiz da umbanda à negação da prática religiosa. Biblioteca Digital de Teses e Dissertações da UFCG (master's thesis) (in Portuguese). Campina Grande, Paraíba, Brazil: Universidade Federal de Campina Grande.
