= Unarius Academy of Science =

Religious organization

Unarius
- Formation: 1954
- Type: UFO religion
- Headquarters: El Cajon, California, USA.
- Members: Unknown
- Leadership: Council of sub-channels
- Key people: Ernest Norman, Ruth Norman, Thomas Miller, Louis Spiegel
- Website: Official website

Unarius is a non-profit organization founded in 1954 in Los Angeles, California, and headquartered in El Cajon, California. The organization purports to advance a new "interdimensional science of life" based upon "fourth-dimensional" physics principles. Unarius centers exist in Canada, New Zealand, Nigeria, the United Kingdom, and various locations in the United States.

Unarius is an acronym for "Universal Articulate Interdimensional Understanding of Science". The founder, and subsequent "channels" and "sub-channels", have written books filled with channeled dissertations from alleged advanced intelligent beings that exist on higher frequency planes. Over 100 volumes have been published since 1954.

== History ==
The group was founded in February 1954 in Los Angeles, California by Ernest Norman (1904–1971) and his wife Ruth Norman (1900–1993).

From 1954–1971, when Ernest still controlled the organization, the organization defined "the mission" as the explanation and promotion of an inter-dimensional science of life in the books he wrote. He said that he had channeled the material via his psychic connections with extraterrestrial intelligences.

Between 1972–1993, while Ruth Norman guided it, the organization grew and had a raised public profile. "The mission" evolved into bringing Unarius to the masses. She accepted interviews, appeared on Late Night with David Letterman and The David Susskind Show and built a video production studio in the late 1970s. Unarius video productions began appearing on public-access television cable TV stations all over the United States. In 2000, Diana Tumminia stated that in several cities in Southern California, the local public access channels carried weekly showings of Unarian films.

As it gained notoriety, Unarius was featured in newspaper and magazine articles as well as radio and television spots.

After Ruth's death in 1993, Charles Louis Spiegel (also known as Antares) became director, a post he retained until his death on December 22, 1999. Since Ruth's death in 1993, the organization struggled, particularly since 2001, when a space-fleet landing predicted by Spiegel in 1980 failed to occur.

Unarians believe in the immortality of the soul, and that all people have reincarnated many times. They also believe that the Solar System was once inhabited by ancient interplanetary civilizations.

The aliens are said to be "human beings" who have lived on Earth and on other planets outside the Solar System. They are said to be more advanced than humans, spiritually and scientifically.

While the group seems to have similarity to the Aetherius Society or Raëlism, as they emphasize "space brothers" who will come from the stars in 33 spaceships to improve humanity, these beliefs are not held by all Unariuns and in fact, are discounted by many as contradictory to true Unariun principles.

In his book, The Truth About Mars, Ernest claimed that the Chinese evolved from ancient interstellar migrants who began colonizing Mars a million years ago. They are reported to have returned to Mars, where they live in underground cities, after being attacked by natives of the Earth. A group which had become separated did not return with them and this group branched off and formed the various Asian racial genotypes.

== Founders ==
Ernest claimed to have been a child prodigy, having read all his father's (a physician from Scandinavia) books alongside formal schooling. He claimed that as a child he performed for family, neighbors, and teachers unexpected feats such as moving a heavy rabbit hutch using Archimedean principles and small logs, building radios, and winning arguments with parents and teachers. According to Unarius, he was a scientist and an aeronautical engineer from whom the idea of the television tube was stolen.

Claiming to possess psychic ability, Ernest began his metaphysical career reading palms and also claimed to have told women of their loved one's whereabouts and often deaths in 1942–1945 during World War II. When his description of fatalities allegedly lowered morale at war plants where he worked, he left and started to give lectures of his own philosophy in theosophical churches during the mid to late 1940s. Before meeting Ruth and the beginning of their mission, Ernest gave psychic readings at spiritualist churches.

Ruth was born in 1900 as the oldest of eight children. She took many jobs to support her family, such as being a fruit packer and a live-in maid. She gave birth to a daughter in her marriage. She purchased a motel, ran a restaurant, and worked at a cannery by the time she was 50 years old.

Both Ernest and Ruth had experiences in spiritualism before the UFO craze in the late 1940s. By the early 1950s, mystics at a psychic convention she attended told her that she was being followed around by long-bearded wise men carrying books and that she would help bring in these books in her future. This same thing was told to Ernest by other mystics at the same convention before they met and later married. Books date their marriage to 1954, and their anniversary is celebrated by Unarius on February 14. Tumminia states that their union brought forth their "mission".

Within weeks of their marriage, Ernest started writing the first Unarius book, The Voice of Venus. Ruth was later known within the group as both "Ioshanna" (1972–1979) and "Uriel" (1980–1993).

== Early years ==
Ernest Norman became a "channeler", the process by which he "wrote" his books. Unarian channeling is a process of relaxed contemplation in which the practitioner closes their eyes and enters into a composed state, allowing thoughts and images to flow freely, as he or she voices "messages" received from a supposed higher consciousness, or "other beings" which speak to or through him or her. The Normans coupled "channeling" with "past life" readings, and developed a devoted following.

Ernest's first books contain themes similar to those in other metaphysical American religions and early 1950s contactees. While the Normans interacted with other early contactee groups, Ernest initially concerned himself with the "spiritual nature" of planets and their supposed history. He briefly mentioned flying saucers, saying that residents of more "spiritual" worlds were concerned about atomic testing, and responded by making their spacecraft visible and increasing contact with Earth people in order to attract attention.

Ernest Norman claimed to receive "transmissions" from Mars and Venus, the homes of "great teachers" and ascended masters who described their cities to him.

Altogether, channeled descriptions of seven spiritual planets including Venus, claimed to be "advanced teaching centers", comprise the set of books known as the "Pulse of Creation" series.

The Normans operated out of their home, and in the 60s and early 70s, they moved to different cities in California before settling in Escondido. During that time, Norman and Ruth claimed to have lived past lives as Jesus and Mary Magdalene, respectively, as well as other famous people. In 1970, Ernest channeled his prime lesson book, The Infinite Concept of Cosmic Creation.

The formation of the mission in February 1954 by the Normans, led to the publication of the Pulse of Creation series. The first book, The Voice of Venus (1956), concerned a psychic trip to Venus and described the advanced wonders of its civilization. Now known as the Moderator, Ernest explained the existence of "healing wards" on that planet where troubled souls go to recuperate from traumatic experiences. He explained this book was not channeled in the usual type of meditative, trance-like state or in a darkened room, but spoken normally and recorded on tape. The work describes communication from Mal-Var of Venus, who gives a tour of the Venusian capital. In the work, Venusians are described to have "energy bodies" and live in a higher vibratory plane that would be invisible to a human were he to stand in the middle of the capital city known as Azure.

The Pulse of Creation series consists of seven books (the last three are bundled as one):

- The Voice of Venus
- The Voice of Eros
- The Voice of Orion
- The Voice of Hermes
- The Voice of Muse, Unarius & Elysium

The seven books describe the seven planes of Shamballa, which are claimed to exist outside the natural world and are spiritual or non-physical worlds. Each plane has a specialty in the teaching of advanced principles, for the betterment of an individual's progressive evolution from life to life.

The planes' specialties are:

- Venus – Healing
- Eros – Science
- Orion – Education
- Hermes – Philosophy
- Muse – The arts
- Unarius – Leadership
- Elysium – Devotion

These books and The Infinite Concept of Cosmic Creation, which was a series of 13 lectures given in 1956 and later compiled into book form with seven advanced lesson courses, constitute the early teachings and beliefs of Unarius.

== Classification as a religion ==
Unarius, as an organization, is strongly opposed to its common classification as a religion. Unarius calls its content and activities teaching "inter-dimensional science" and not a religion, and assert that they teach the "spiritual" understanding of "high energy-physics" and reincarnation.

While Unarius lacks the main elements normally associated with religion, such as a hierarchical structure, priests and clergy, initiation rites, weekly services or ceremonies, its beliefs satisfy many religious criteria in that spiritual reality is taught; humans develop their spiritual potential over lifetimes; the concept of the Space Brothers is basically a supernatural assumption as they seem different in kind, and are empirically unprovable; they involve a Western concept of good and evil and an Eastern concept of karma; higher entities are channeled; the texts read like sacred scriptures; and its system of beliefs can explain or dispel all phenomena, thus satisfying all questions of meaning for adherents. Unarians do not offer prayers to God or higher entities, but prefer the word "spiritual" as opposed to "religious" to describe the overriding philosophy of the group.

Ernest criticized religion in several books, most notably in The Infinite Contact, which describes in detail the origins of Christianity as rooted in Mithraism, Zoroastrianism, and assorted ancient belief structures. Ernest agreed with Karl Marx that religions were "the opium of the people", and yet also claimed to realize that many individuals were still at such a point in their evolution where religions still served a positive purpose and kept them from harming their fellowmen.

== Principles and beliefs ==
Unarius was established to teach the "fourth-dimensional science" a.k.a. "the Science of Life", which incorporates such New Age themes as "harmonic frequencies", karma, reincarnation, past-life memories, channeling, and an elaborate cosmology of "spiritual planets". Central tenets of the belief system include contact with the "Space Brothers" and a millenarian prophecy that predicts a mass landing of starships.

"The Science" asserts that everything is energy: atoms, higher knowledge, bodies, and experiences. This energy "vibrates in frequencies and wave forms".

Unarius belief can be separated into four themes: intelligent life on other planets and galaxies, an infinite creative intelligence, that human beings are developing towards an advanced state of consciousness, and the millennial hope of the advent of a landing. According to Unarius, the purpose of the research institution is "to awaken the individual to previous life encounters, the clairvoyant aptitude of the mind, and the reality of one's spiritual connection".

Although the group is generally known for its predictions regarding flying saucers landing on Earth, Ernest stressed his spiritual teachings as the key to personal development and mastery over material circumstances. In one instance, he derided flying saucer chasers as another manifestation of people pursuing an "escape mechanism".

== The 1970s ==
When Ernest died in 1971, the mission was continued by Ruth. New "sub-channels" authored the books with her. The two sub-channels, Thomas Miller and Louis Spiegel, are credited on a number of the organization's books starting in 1972.

After a channeling revealed a lifetime lived in ancient Atlantis with the name Ioshanna, Ruth adopted the name. She claimed to have lived over 200 previous lives. Much of Unarian cosmology and lore revolves around the past lives of Uriel.

From 1954 to 1974, meetings were held in Ruth's home or at public meeting facilities. In 1972, the channeled messages referred to "33 worlds of an interplanetary confederation".

Ruth became a visionary, and with help rapidly increased the frequency of "messages from space". In 1973, she became known as "Uriel the Archangel", said to be her "higher self". In November 1973, Ruth purchased 67 acres in Jamul, California, for a proposed landing site for the Space Brothers.

In 1974, in the "Tesla Speaks" volumes, Ruth redefined the Unarian mission by introducing the concept of the Interplanetary Confederation and the prophecy of a 33-vehicle spacefleet landing. The landing date was revised to 2001. All unfulfilled prophecies were explained as being a reliving of Unarian past lives in the Isis-Osiris cycle.

In 1975, the organization moved its base from Glendale, California, to El Cajon, California, where a storefront center was opened. Unarius was also incorporated as a non-profit, tax-exempt, educational foundation. In El Cajon, Ruth became well known for driving a blue 1969 Cadillac Coupe d’Ville adorned with airbrushed depictions of spaceships with a large metal flying saucer on the roof; the car remains with Unarius and is driven every year in the annual El Cajon Mother Goose Parade.

In 1976, past life therapy (called psychic group therapy) became formalized as part of the curriculum, became the main activity of students, and was regarded as a healing practice. The content of Unarian belief increased as these revelations evolved into collective biographies of members who are believed to have acted under Uriel on Earth and many other planets throughout millennia. Tumminia comments that this type of collective weaving of past-life narratives as a regular practice of intersubjectivity may be unique to Unarius.

Most Unarians were skeptical about the future predictions of a space fleet landing, also channeled by Louis Spiegel, and felt that they undermined Ernest's original mission and a schism happened. Around 1980, Miller left the organization, leaving Spiegel as the only sub-channel. From this point forward, more activities revolved around these predictions. Ruth participated less in the goings-on at the center and Unarians turned to Spiegel for guidance and instruction.

In the early 1970s, a Conclave of Light celebration was held at the U.S. Grant Hotel in San Diego, California, and repeated yearly at different venues, and at the Unarius center in El Cajon, California, from 1975 onwards. Every October, Unarius stages its "Interplanetary Conclave of Light". In the late 1970s, Unarius started to make films and videos.

== Schism ==
Unarius generally has two types of students: the followers of Ernest's original texts and works, and those who believe in every channeling that occurred after his death. The latter group is often blamed by the former for the ridicule and mockery the organization has received by the general public since the early 1980s for the group's reputation becoming a "flying saucer group."

== The 1980s ==
In the early 1980s, Unarius videos were developed and produced through public-access television cable TV channels nationwide. Unarius opened new centers in the United States, Canada, and Nigeria. During this period, the public identity of the organization changed from a group teaching a "metaphysical science of life" to a "flying saucer group."

In 1984, Ruth declared Spiegel to have overcome his past negative karma as the Fallen Angel, Satan, and renamed him Antares. Subsequently, he channeled elements of the millenarian prophecy, including a new planet Myton which would send a spaceship in the year 2001

Ruth directed the organization for two decades and published over 80 books. She broke her hip in 1988 and her health began to slip the following year.

== The 1990s ==
After several falls and surgeries in the late eighties, Ruth had more limited physical contact with the students and members, but said she was "psychically" communicating with them on a day-to-day basis.

Ruth became bedridden, rarely visiting the center herself, and let members know that her work was over before dying in 1993. Her death disproved a long-held prophecy that the landing would take place in her lifetime. Her will stated that she would return with the Space Brothers in 2001.

Spiegel assumed leadership in the organization. As director, he wrote many books on reincarnation and consciousness. Unlike the Normans, he did not claim to have made "psychic/mental voyages" to other planets, but has claimed to have channeled Ruth.

After Ruth's death, some long-term students left over disagreements with Spiegel in the 1990s; they wanted to refocus on Ernest's original teachings and the more "scientific" aspects of Unarius. Some students disputed the importance of Ruth and prophecies concerning her.

Spiegel died in December 1999, and in 2000, a board of directors formed to guide the center. The board legitimized its cooperative authority through channeled messages, in particular from Ruth and Spiegel, who are now Space Brothers. Channeling theorized that the Space Brothers guide the world invisibly and cannot become visible until the world becomes less warlike.

Students also left or became home-study students because they disagreed with Spiegel's channelings, particularly one which claimed that it was time for Ruth, then quite ill but still living, to return to the unseen world. It was in complete opposition to previously expounded Unarian principle, wherein members, no matter how far advanced, never interfered or predicted future human activities. Many Unarians perceived this as a power-grab against Ruth. In the belief system of the school, this was related to a "negative reliving" of a previous existence, creating false, negative messages.

Ruth's flamboyance and costumes worn in later years were the subject of some attention. Alex Heard, in Apocalypse Pretty Soon: Travels In End-Time America, described her as "a true American original who combined the couture sensibilities of a drag queen with the joie de vivre of a Frisbee-chasing Irish Setter."

Around 2000, local public access channels screened weekly showings of Unarian films in several cities in Southern California.

== 2001 ==
With no space fleet landing, Unarius doubled down on its roots and principles while simultaneously demonstrating a belief in a future landing by extraterrestrials to assist humankind. With Spiegel's passing in late 1999, the organization formed a small council which shares leadership and management responsibilities.

Unarius continues to be active both in the US and in several European countries.

The millennial aspect of Unarius reverted to a more privatised rapture-oriented millennialism after Ruth's death.

== Practices ==
A central practice of Unarius is "past-life therapy," which members refer to as the "Science." The organization teaches that the root cause of current psychological or physical problems stems from trauma experienced in previous lives. By uncovering and "reliving" these traumatic events—often through a form of psychodrama or filmmaking—members believe they can heal the past karma and resolve the issue.

In the late 1970s and 1980s, this therapy evolved into elaborate video productions. Members would create costumes and sets to reenact their supposed past lives on Earth and other planets. These "psychodramas" were filmed and became a core part of the group's internal curriculum and public outreach.

== Films ==
- Welcome Space Brothers (dir. Jodi Wille, 2023; released 2026)

== See also ==
- Aetherius Society
- Share International
- New Age
- New religious movement
- Theosophy
- UFO
