= Mark-Age =

American UFO religion

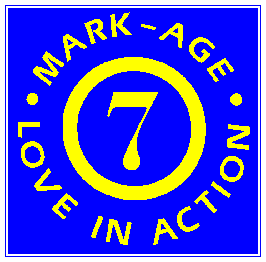
- Mark-Age logo
- Type: New religious movement
- Classification: UFO religion
- Headquarters: Pioneer, Tennessee, U.S.
- Founder: Pauline Sharpe and Charles Boyd Gentzel
- Origin: 1962; Miami, Florida, U.S.
- Other name: Mark-Age MetaCenter
- Official website: www.thenewearth.org/markage.html

Mark-Age (formerly Mark-Age MetaCenter) is an American UFO religion. It was founded in 1962 in Miami, Florida by Pauline Sharpe (Nada-Yolanda) and Charles Boyd Gentzel (Mark). Its headquarters later moved to Fort Lauderdale, Florida in the 1970s and then Pioneer, Tennessee by the 2000s. The group incorporates New Age, UFO contactee, and Theosophical elements. Mark-Age believes itself to be a contact point with extraterrestrials who govern the Solar System, and believe in an alien-assisted Second Coming. It was one of the most significant and largest contactee groups.

Founded after the founders claimed to receive a spiritual message in the 1950s, members believe in channeling messages which are supposedly communicated through telepathy and automatic writing. Members were affiliated with the contactee Gloria Lee, and claimed to channel her after she died, writing a book claiming to contain her messages from beyond. The group has published its beliefs in several publications and periodicals.

== History ==
Mark-Age was founded as the Mark-Age MetaCenter in 1962 (some sources say 1960) in Miami, Florida by Pauline Sharpe (born 1925) and Charles Boyd Gentzel (born 1922). Both were channelers, and Sharpe was a contactee. Charles Boyd Gentzel was known as Mark and Pauline Sharpe was known within the group as Nada-Yolanda. While it was officially founded in the 1960s, the group was based on a spiritual message Gentzel had supposedly received in 1956, with the name "Mark-Age" being "revealed" in 1949, which was deepened by a second message on the significance of the name six years later. Among the early members were several claimed psychics, including Jeanene Moore (Astrid), James Hughes Speed (Wains), and Holden Lindsey (Zan-Thu).

Mark-Age was affiliated with Gloria Lee, the founder of the Cosmon Research Foundation. She died in 1962 during a hunger strike, communicating with the group shortly before her death, and after her death members claimed to commune with her. The year after her death they published Gloria Lee Lives! which purported to be her communications from beyond. This publication increased the group's size. At some point the group shortened its name to simply Mark-Age, Inc. The group moved to Fort Lauderdale, Florida in 1972. They bought a location there in 1977, buying an estate in Santa Monica Canyon in California the same year, which was used as a retreat center. Gentzel died in 1981; that year, Sharpe became executive director of Mark-Age. Sharpe maintained this position until her death in 2005. A 1995 source says it was led by a group of 4. As of 2007, the group's headquarters are located in Pioneer, Tennessee.

== Beliefs ==
Mark-Age is a contactee or UFO religion, as well as a New Age one, with Christian elements. Their beliefs are heavily influenced by Theosophy, and may have taken influence from ufologist George Adamski. Scholars J. Gordon Melton and George M. Eberhart listed it in 1995 as one of the major contactee groups, and it was also one of the largest. Their beliefs also incorporated older contactee stories. They described themself as dealing with "the relationships and the responsibilities between the angelic and the man kingdoms [...] the actual words of the seven archangels [...] spiritual guidelines for the Latter Days and the Second Coming. The problem of evil is blamed on the spiritual inadequacy of current humanity; they wrote in their texts that "the human race is responsible for evil … There is no such thing as Satan, except the evil that lives in men’s minds, hearts, desires, ambitions and greed"; despite saying Satan does not exist, they use Christian terminology. They reinterpret Armageddon as instead being "where each person must accept responsibility for the conditions prevailing everywhere on the planet".

The researcher John A. Saliba noted them as illustrating "the belief in beings from outer space can be incorporated in what is essentially a contemporary form of spiritualism", while Christopher Partridge listed it with the Aetherius Society as especially prominent examples of a specific kind of Theosophical religion, which while they were "fundamentally physicalist, expound a more traditionally theosophical worldview". Placing UFO religions on a spectrum, Partridge argued that they had a spectrum of religiosity, from the basically secular Raëlianism at the extreme end of the secular and physicalist end, the Aetherius Society in the middle, and Mark-Age at the extreme of supernatural and only slightly physicalist religions.

=== Hierarchical Board ===
The beliefs of Mark-Age involved a "communication plan" for the transition to the Age of Aquarius. Mark-Age believes itself to be a contact point with the "higher beings" of the "Hierarchical Board" (also spelled Hierarchal Board; effectively the Theosophical ascended master figures) which have spiritually governed the Solar System since the beginning of the "transition" from the Age of Pisces to the Age of Aquarius (the 1960s). Members would channel from these beings, supposedly distributing them through telepathy and automatic writing.

They claimed to be "commissioned by the Hierarchal Board to implant a prototype of spiritual government on Earth, the I Am Nation. The I Am Nation is a government of, for and by the I Am Selves of all people on Earth [...] It is not a political government, but is a spiritual congregation of all souls who seek to serve God, first and foremost, and the I Am Selves of all people on Earth." While initially done by many members, Nada-Yolanda became the main figure later on and did most of the channeling, seen as a telepathic medium.

=== Extraterrestrials ===
Mark-Age also believe in ethereal, non-corporeal spaceships, created by an alien species on another planet with superior technology, with which one could communicate with other planets using telepathy. They believe that UFOs have interfered in the Earth's history on many occasions, and believed that Jesus would return come the Year 2000. God would then form a worldwide government of a spiritual nature, and the planet would be transformed and purified. Even past this date in 2007 the group still believed in an alien-assisted future Second Coming.

Another belief of the group was that Sananda (Jesus), a member of the Hierarchical board had been orbiting the Earth in an ethereal spacecraft since 1885, and that he would manifest once the planet was cleansed. They quote Jesus in their texts as claiming "I have come many times to the Earth planet as a leader and as a spiritual ruler responsible for that which does happen in this plane or cycle", and Mark-Age writes of his past incarnations that they count "Khufu, Melchizedek, Moses, Elijah, Zarathustra, Gautama Buddha, Socrates, and Jesus of Nazareth". They believe that, among others, the theosophical master Morya, other theosophical masters, Gloria Lee, and U.S. president John F. Kennedy have sent them messages through channeling. After Gentzel died in 1981, members believed he sent them messages as Morya.

== Publications ==
Mark-Age produced a large amount of written materials covering their beliefs and channelings, which were written in several books. The most important book distributed by the group was their introductory work Mark-Age Period and Program, which has much of their material in condensed form. It outlines their organization, how to raise the spiritual status of man using meditation and psychic advancement, and defines their hierarchy; scholar J. Gordon Melton noted it as "very Theosophical", barring the aliens.

They published works for associated groups and also operated the Mark-Age Inform-Nations, or MAIN, as the group's periodical, as well as the I Am Nation Newsletter. Another creed was their "Spiritual Creed for Light Workers", though this was generically New Age and not specific to their beliefs. Mark-Age and their material also influenced other religious groups, among them Dave W. Bent and the Last Day Messengers.

== Bibliography ==
- Gloria Lee Lives! My Experiences Since Leaving Earth. Miami: Mark-Age MetaCenter. 1963.
- Nada-Yolanda (1970). Mark-Age Period and Program. Miami: Mark-Age.
- Group Guidelines for New Age Light Centers. Miami: Mark-Age MetaCenter. 1971.
- Cosmic Lessons: Gloria Lee Channels for Mark-Age. Miami: Mark-Age MetaCenter. 1969–1972.
- Nada-Yolanda (1974). Visitors from Other Planets. Miami: Mark-Age.
- Plan a Nation. Miami: Mark-Age. 1974.
- 1000 Keys to the Truth. Miami: Mark-Age. 1976.
