= Ruth Norman =

American religious leader (1900–1993)

- Ruth Norman, dressed as Queen Uriel
- Born: Ruth Nields; August 18, 1900; Indianapolis, Indiana, U.S.
- Died: July 12, 1993 (aged 92); El Cajon, California, U.S.
- Occupation: Religious leader
- Known for: Co-founder of Unarius Academy of Science

Ruth E. Norman (born Ruth Nields; August 18, 1900 – July 12, 1993), also known as Uriel, was an American religious leader who co-founded the Unarius Academy of Science, based in Southern California. Raised in California, Norman received little education and worked from an early age in a variety of jobs. In the 1940s, she developed an interest in psychic phenomena and past-life regression. These pursuits led to her introduction to Ernest Norman, a self-described psychic, in 1954. He engaged in channeling, past-life regression, and attempts at communication with extraterrestrials. She married Ernest, her fourth husband, in the mid-1950s. Together they published several books about his revelations and formed Unarius, an organization which later became known as the Unarius Academy of Science, to popularize his teachings. The couple discussed numerous details about their alleged past lives and spiritual visits to other planets, forming a mythology from these accounts.

After Ernest died in 1971, Ruth succeeded him as their group's leader and primary channeler. She subsequently began publishing accounts of her experiences and revelations. In early 1974, she predicted that a space fleet of benevolent extraterrestrials, the Space Brothers, would land on Earth later that year, which led the Unarius Academy to purchase a property to serve as the landing site. After the extraterrestrials failed to appear, Norman said that trauma she had suffered in a past life had caused her to make an inaccurate prediction. Undaunted, she rented a building for Unarius' meetings and sought publicity for the movement, claiming to have united the Earth with an interplanetary confederation. She revised the Space Brothers' expected landing date several times, before finally settling on 2001. Her health declined in the late 1980s, prompting her students to try to heal her with rituals of past-life regression. Despite predicting that she would live to see the extraterrestrials land, Norman died in 1993. Unarius has continued to operate after her death, and formed a board of directors. Since the 2000s, leaders have concentrated on individual transformation leading to spiritual change in humankind.

== Early life and marriages ==
Ruth Nields was born in Indianapolis, Indiana, on August 18, 1900. Three years later, her family moved to Pasadena, California, where her father worked as an upholsterer. She and her five siblings were reared there, receiving little education and working from a young age. As a teenager, she labored as a fruit packer and a maid. Most of her income went to her father, whom she later described as abusive.

In 1918, she married a man named Frank R. De Silvas and they had a daughter two years later. The couple divorced in the early 1920s; Frank gained custody of their daughter, although Ruth had access as well. Little is known for certain about Ruth's life from the mid-1920s to the 1940s, but she worked in a variety of jobs. She held positions in several restaurants and also worked as a model, real-estate broker, resort manager, and nanny. In the 1940s, she enrolled at the Church of Religious Science, where she studied New Thought under Ernest Holmes, and was separately introduced to psychic healing in that decade. Over time, she also became interested in spiritualism, channeling, and past-life regression. She married Benjamin Arnold in the 1940s; the marriage lasted until his death in 1951. Two years later, she remarried and settled in Lancaster, California. Her third husband, George Marian, owned a milk-delivery business which Ruth helped him to manage. In the mid-1950s, she became interested in acting and earned the starring role in a local play.

== Marriage to Ernest Norman ==
In 1954, at a psychic event in California, Ruth was introduced to Ernest Norman, who told her that in a past life she had been the daughter of an Egyptian Pharaoh and had protected Moses. Members of the organization they later established, the Unarius Academy of Science, affirm that Ernest and Ruth married on the day they met, and the group celebrates their anniversary as February 14, 1954. However, Diana Tumminia of California State University, Sacramento, notes in her 2005 study of the group that Ruth was probably still married to George Marian in early 1954 and speculates that their divorce was a lengthy process; Tumminia posits that Ernest and Ruth married in 1956.

Ernest believed he could communicate with both extraterrestrials and historical figures, channeling messages from them. In 1954, seeking to popularize his channeling, Ernest and Ruth formed an organization known as Unarius, operating from their home in California. After their marriage, Ruth served as Ernest's typist, later claiming to have learned the skill while sleeping. She recorded the information he channeled, writing books about psychic healing and trips into the Solar System. In the 1950s and 1960s, they attracted several followers, including two students whom they later taught to channel. One early trainee was Charles Spiegel, who later led the group. Many converts had previous involvement with New Age or mystic groups, making it easy for the Normans to convert them.

Converts were provided with elaborate details of Ernest and Ruth Norman's purported spiritual visits to other planets. The couple believed that humans could learn from great teachers on these journeys; Ernest said that this contact held the potential to educate and heal humanity. Ernest also spoke of the scientific advancements of other worlds. The couple also discussed revelations about their past lives, including Jesus and Mary of Bethany among their past identities. Ruth stated that she had lived about 50 lives over several million years; she recalled being several well-known and a few obscure people on Earth, as well as beings from other planets and an archangel. Their group developed a mythology from the accounts that Ernest and Ruth gave of these lives, including tales from their past incarnations in Atlantis and Lemuria. Some of their stories were similar to the plots of contemporary books and films, prompting Tumminia to cast their beliefs as a pastiche or bricolage of the surrounding culture.

Ernest and Ruth promoted millennialist teachings, holding that higher beings were to transform the Earth and bring devotees to a new level of existence; the couple held that this growth would allow people to travel through space. Zeller compares their millennialist doctrines to those of Christian dispensationalism, noting their shared utopian views.

== Leadership and death of Ernest ==
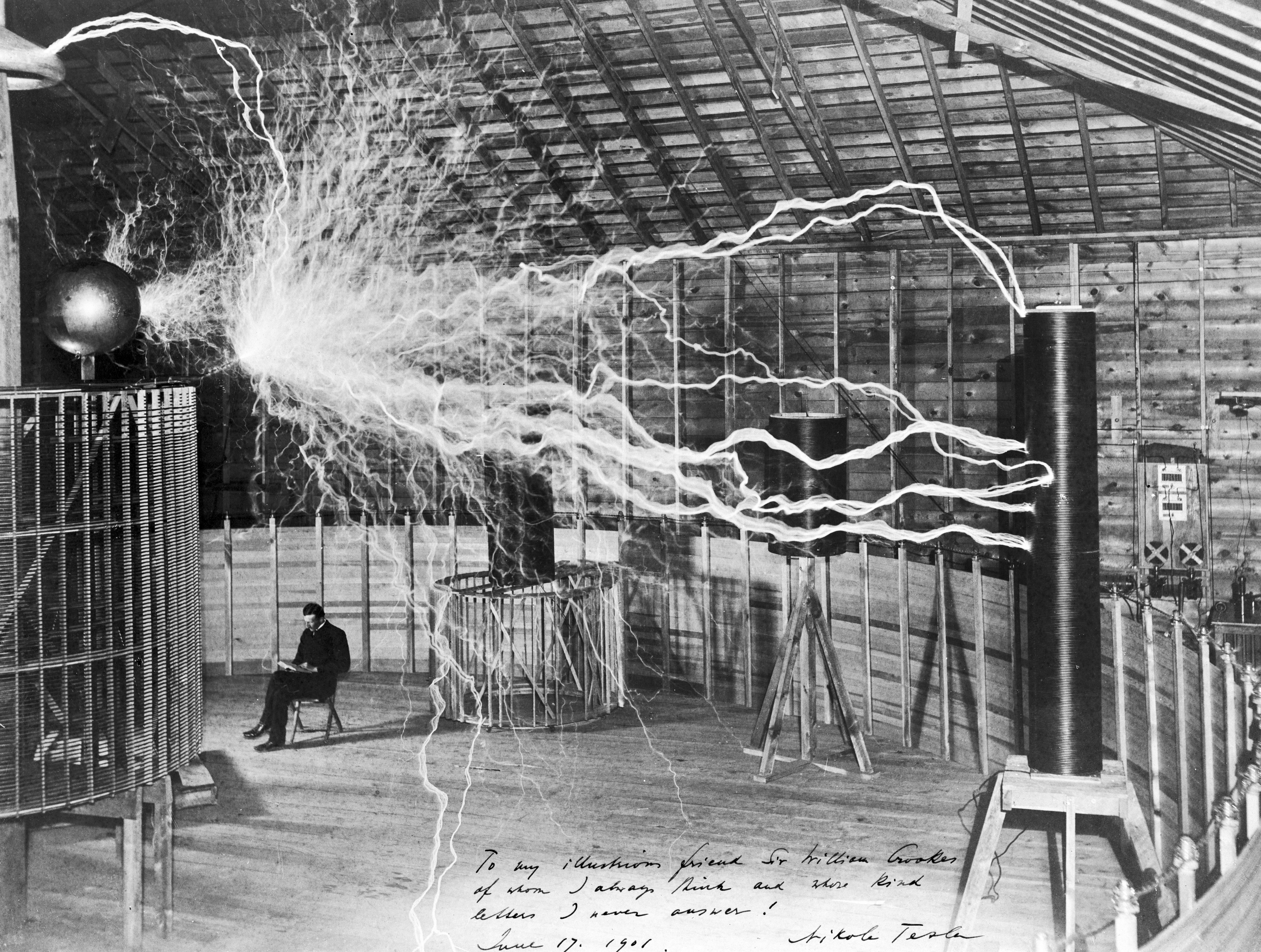
Nikola Tesla, to whom the group attributed several documents, experimenting in 1899

Ernest died in 1971; thereafter, Ruth led their organization and served as its primary channeler. Spiegel moved to San Diego to assist her. After Ernest died, Spiegel affirmed Ruth's nascent belief that she was an archangel named Uriel from the "fourth dimension".

In 1972, Ruth Norman began publishing Tesla Speaks, a series of messages that she said were given to her by the American inventor and engineer Nikola Tesla from his dwelling in outer space; she stated that he also relayed messages from scientists Albert Einstein and Louis Pasteur to her. Norman asserted that the Tesla Tower held secrets which were to be recovered by Unarius. The American journalist Alexander S. Heard argues that Tesla's rumored interests in death rays and free energy drew the group to him. In 1973, Norman recounted an experience in which she spiritually married the archangel Michiel at a lavishly decorated temple on another planet; the event was said to have culminated with her being crowned the Queen of Archangels, Uriel, by the Archangel Raphiel. She and Spiegel envisioned the events of the ceremony over several days, and she published their recollections later that year. Her students subsequently referred to her as Uriel, an acronym of "universal, radiant, infinite, eternal light". She and Spiegel re-enacted the ceremony for her followers, and the group celebrated the anniversary of the event annually. After her spiritual marriage, Norman increased her channeling of historical figures, including Plato, Tesla, and John F. Kennedy.

== Prophecy and therapy ==
=== First extraterrestrial prophecy ===
In a volume published in March 1974, Norman predicted that a spacefleet of an "Intergalactic Confederation" (Note: Norman taught her students that she founded the Confederacy of 33 planets millions of years ago in a past life. (Tumminia 2005, p. 73)) was to land on Earth before December 1974. In November 1974, assisted by some of her students, Norman purchased a 67-acre (0.27 km^{2}) property near Jamul, California, to serve as a landing site for extraterrestrials, whom she referred to as the "Space Brothers". At some point in 1974, Norman revised the date at which she expected extraterrestrials to land to September 1975, citing ongoing Confederation efforts to prepare humanity for their landing as the reason for the delay. She predicted that a single flying saucer would bring extraterrestrials to persuade humans of their teachings, after which another 33 vessels would arrive. These beings were to restore the lost teachings of Atlantis to the Earth, and their revelations were to free humanity from crime and disease, ushering in an era of learning. (Note: In Norman's view, there were many levels of beings in the universe, and humans were the lowest. (Coleman 1979)) She believed that this information would be imparted by a thousand extraterrestrial scientists, who would also bring advances in technology, among which she specified crystal computers, to Earth. Norman presumed that Confederation leaders were to take her on a world tour after their arrival, and she bought herself a new wardrobe in preparation. In addition, she arranged a large banner to welcome them, made arrangements for buses to the landing site, and informed the National Enquirer, an American tabloid, of her expectations. In early September 1975, she gave a farewell message, telling of her future home on a spaceship. On September 22, however, she concluded that a landing would not occur and stated that she was reliving the trauma of a past life—in which she was Isis—when she was assassinated shortly before extraterrestrials were to land. She explained that the effects of this trauma had caused her to make an inaccurate prediction. Norman led the group in classes to teach them how to relive the event that had culminated in Isis' assassination and took them to the expected landing site to stir their memories. They began to hold public meetings again in November. Several students doubted Norman's explanation; some of them left the group. (Note: By the mid-1970s, Norman had formed a 40-member core group. (Kirkpatrick & Tumminia 1995, p. 93))

In 1975, Norman used the proceeds of a home sale to rent a storefront for her group's meetings, which they lavishly decorated. She purported to be the "Spirit of Beauty" and the "Goddess of Love"; in this capacity, she claimed complete knowledge of truth and the ability to heal. After their new headquarters opened, Norman told her students—and the media—that she was an ambassador from the Interplanetary Confederation, and, in February 1975, she opened the Academy of Parapsychology, Healing, and Psychic Science, which soon became known as the Unarius Academy of Science. (Note: Unarius is an acronym for "universal articulate interdimensional understanding of science". (Melton 2010, p. 2936)) The group celebrates the anniversary of the union of Earth and the confederation annually around October 12.

=== Past-life therapy and subsequent prophecies ===
Norman pioneered a form of past-life therapy, teaching her disciples how to recall details of experiences from their past incarnations. These recollections contributed to the group's mythology, which developed over time with student input. Unarius' members occasionally recalled crimes that they had committed in past lives, including times they harmed incarnations of Ruth Norman. The students sometimes acted out and filmed scenes from their previous incarnations, an experience that participants found therapeutic; they cited this benefit as proof that the events were real. Norman's therapy, according to R. George Kirkpatrick of San Diego State University and Tumminia, differed from most New Age past-life therapies in the way that it wove her followers into the group's narrative.

In March 1976, Norman publicly wagered $4,000 with the British gambling firm Ladbrokes that extraterrestrials would land on Earth within one year, a prediction which attracted media attention. Tumminia states that Norman had "no public distress" over the failure of her prediction. Despite the negative publicity from the prophecy's failure, new members were attracted to the group. After losing the wager, Norman changed the expected landing date to 2001; she taught that the close of the 20th century coincided with the beginning of a new cycle which would bring great benefits to humanity. Representatives of Unarius later stated that the prophecies had been misunderstood and that the Space Brothers had not visited because humanity was not yet ready for them. They have argued that Unarius' teachings must be understood to correctly interpret Norman's statements. Tumminia writes that they used "adaptive storytelling and continuous narrative invention" to explain the failure of the prophecy.

The group enjoyed publicity, and media outlets regularly covered them. Most journalists portrayed Unarius as a curiosity and accentuated its novel aspects. In the area near their headquarters, they were viewed as an unusual group with strict behavioral standards. One local writer published a sensationalist account of the group under the title "The Gods Must Be Crazy". But, after interviewing Norman in 1976, Brad Steiger, who has written extensively about the paranormal, gave a positive account of Unarius. Norman disliked academic writings about her organization, seeing them as unfairly negative.

== 1980s and 1990s ==
In 1979, Norman claimed to have an unofficial following of more than 100,000. That year, she announced a spiritual promotion: she was no longer an archangel but, with Michiel, a "Lord of the Universe" and a "Prince of the Realm". She renamed Spiegel as "Antares" in 1984, stating that he had overcome the evil of his past incarnations; he subsequently began to channel. As of 1986, the group had about 450 regular students and charged $5 per class. At that time, Norman lived in a house in La Mesa, California, with two of her disciples.

Assisted by her followers, Norman recorded her teachings in about 80 books. She wrote educational materials designed to empower students by teaching them about subjects such as the "psychology of consciousness" and "self-mastery". Ernest and Ruth Norman's writings are revered as scripture by members of the Unarius Academy. The group developed a set of six core sacred narratives about the past lives of its founders, describing key events on Earth and other planets. These myths featured tales of romance, war, and scientific advances in the Aries and Orion constellations and in ancient civilizations on Earth. Kirkpatrick and Tumminia state that the Unarian canon appears to be incoherent to outsiders, but is appreciated as a cohesive body of literature by the group's members.

Norman wore a variety of brightly colored, elaborate costumes and was often photographed by media while wearing royal-style gowns and wigs and holding a scepter. She stated that her habiliments mirrored the practices of extraterrestrials, whose attire she said was brighter and more radiant than clothing on Earth. At the group's headquarters, she had a gold-colored throne that was decorated with peacock feathers. Her assistants helped shepherd her media image; Kirkpatrick and Tumminia speculate that her charisma was primarily responsible for gaining publicity for the group.

Followers of Norman held her in high regard: they occasionally fainted when she touched them, and some wept when allowed to meet with her. They painted several portraits of her, one of which they believed had healing powers. According to students, Norman healed them in their dreams and sometimes reported seeing visions of her. Several times, group members chose to forgo cancer treatment, trusting in Norman to heal them. Tumminia says that Norman was a clear example of the German sociologist Max Weber's concept of charismatic authority. Norman sometimes had disagreements with students and excommunicated two senior assistants who questioned her, although she welcomed one back a few years later. If healing was unsuccessfully sought, the failure to receive it was sometimes attributed to disloyalty to leadership. Criticism of Norman was not tolerated by the group; Tumminia describes Norman's leadership style as "benign authoritarian".

=== Declining health and death ===
In 1988, Norman broke a hip and her health began to decline. Although she had promised to live until 2001, her deteriorating condition made her followers suspect she would die before then, causing them some distress and denial. In an attempt to help her recover, students used past-life regression to recall interactions with her, and some became very emotional after experiencing memories of events in which they had rejected and hurt her. Norman returned to leading services in February 1989, making a quicker than expected recovery, which was attributed to the past-life rituals. After a period of good health, her condition again deteriorated, prompting students to resume recounting their past crimes. Norman lost most of her hearing and experienced chronic pain; she was admitted to a hospital in December 1989, but by the summer she was well enough to be present at events. She was nearly bedridden in her last years and was attended to by some followers. In 1991, she stated that the Space Brothers had given her permission to die before their expected arrival in 2001.

Before her death, Norman met with each of her followers; she died in El Cajon, California on July 12, 1993, and was cremated. In her will, she promised to return to Earth, accompanied by the Space Brothers, in eight years. Students, some of whom were surprised and confused by her death, were instructed by leaders not to grieve because she was in a celestial state. Some of them privately mourned, and a few left the group. Items of Norman's were distributed to students, some of whom wore them at later events.

After Norman's death, Antares took over as leader and channeled messages from her. Others later began channeling her, and recordings of her messages were replayed. Antares died in 1999, and a board of directors assumed leadership of the organization and channeled. In the 2000s, Unarius' leaders emphasized individual transformation, focusing on a gradual spiritual change in humanity.

== Legacy ==
Images of Norman have been used to attract attention by some outside of the Unarius Academy of Science. In 1996, an MTV executive viewed a picture of Norman and decided to use her image in an advertising campaign for the MTV Music Video Awards. The network contacted the Unarius Academy of Science and received permission to use a look-alike in their promotions. In 2000, Norman was featured on the cover of Kooks: A Guide to the Outer Limits of Human Belief, a book about personalities with fringe beliefs.

After Norman's death, public opinion of her organization was strongly influenced by the 1997 mass suicide of Heaven's Gate, a UFO religion whose members occupied a house within 50 miles (80 km) of the Unarius Academy of Science. In the suicides' aftermath, some reporters and members of the anti-cult movement described Unarius as a similar group. Tumminia disagreed with this portrayal, casting Unarius' practices as no more dangerous than those of widely accepted religions.

== Bibliography ==
=== Books ===
- Heard, Alexander S. (1999), Apocalypse Pretty Soon: Travels In End-Time America, Crown Publishing Group, ISBN 978-0-385-49852-4
- Kirkpatrick, R. George; Tumminia, Diana (1995), "Unarius: Emergent Aspects of an American Flying Saucer Group", in James R. Lewis (ed.), The Gods Have Landed: New Religions from Other Worlds, SUNY Press, ISBN 978-0-7914-2330-1
- Kirkpatrick, R. George; Tumminia, Diana (2004), "The Mythic Dimension of New Religious Movements: Function, Reality Construction, and Process", in James R. Lewis (ed.), The Oxford Handbook of New Religious Movements, Oxford University Press, ISBN 978-0-19-514986-9
- Melton, J. Gordon (2010), "Unarius", in J. Gordon Melton; Martin Baumann (eds.), Religions of the World, Second Edition: A Comprehensive Encyclopedia of Beliefs and Practices, ABC-CLIO, ISBN 978-1-59884-204-3
- Saliba, John A. (2003), "UFO and Religion: A Case Study of Unarius Academy of Science", in James R. Lewis (ed.), Encyclopedic Sourcebook of UFO Religions, Prometheus Books, ISBN 978-1-57392-964-6
- Tumminia, Diana (2003), "How Prophecy Never Fails: Interpretive Reason in a Flying Saucer Group", in James R. Lewis (ed.), Encyclopedic Sourcebook of UFO Religions, Prometheus Books, ISBN 978-1-57392-964-6
- Tumminia, Diana (2003), "When the Archangel Died: From Revelation to Routinization of Charisma in Unarius", in Christopher Partridge (ed.), UFO Religions, Psychology Press, ISBN 978-0-415-26324-5
- Tumminia, Diana (2005), When Prophecy Never Fails: Myth and Reality in a Flying-Saucer Group, Oxford University Press, ISBN 978-0-19-517675-9
- Zeller, Benjamin E. (2009), "Apocalyptic Thought in UFO-Based Religions", in Karolyn Kinane; Michael A. Ryan (eds.), End of Days: Essays on the Apocalypse from Antiquity to Modernity, McFarland & Company, ISBN 978-0-7864-4204-1

=== Journals ===
- Tumminia, Diana (2002), "In the Dreamtime of the Saucer People", Journal of Contemporary Ethnography, 31 (6): 675–705, doi:10.1177/089124102237821, S2CID 143815111

=== Magazines ===
- Davis, Ruth (August 26, 1996), "I Want My AARP", New York: 28

=== Newspapers ===
- Coleman, Warner (February 7, 1979), "Cosmic Society Says Help on the Way", Los Angeles Times(subscription required)
- Granberry, Mike (September 29, 1986), "Unarius Students Await Dawning of a New Age", Los Angeles Times
