= Gloria Lee =

American contactee (1926–1962)

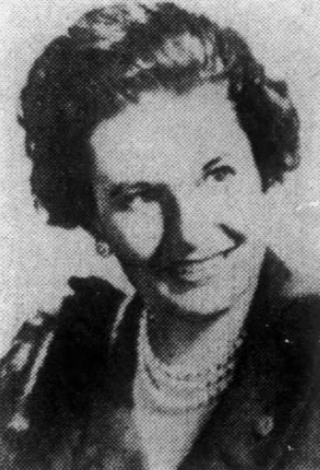
- Undated photo of Lee
- Born: February 22, 1926; Los Angeles, California, U.S.
- Died: December 2, 1962 (aged 36); Washington, D.C., U.S.
- Known for: Contactee
- Spouse: William H. Byrd (m. 1952)
- Children: 2

Gloria Lee Byrd (March 22, 1926 – December 2, 1962) was an American airline flight attendant who was one of the most prominent figures of the contactee movement in the 1960s. She founded and lead the Cosmon Research Foundation, headquartered in Torrance, California. Lee claimed to receive automatic writing and later telepathic communications from a Venusian entity named J. W.; she wrote two books which she claimed were dictated to her through automatic writing. Her group had up to 2000 members.

Lee held talks on flying saucers and was described as a "space cultist" or cult leader by some press outlets. As a result of her claims, her husband urged her to see a psychiatrist in 1959, resulting in her being diagnosed with paranoia, after which she refused consultations. After she visited Washington, D.C., in an effort for politicians to take her seriously, they did not, and she died in a hunger strike out of protest.

== Early life ==
Gloria Lee was born March 22, 1926, in Los Angeles, California, in the United States. As a teenager, she was a movie actress. Having an early interest in flying, she became one of the earliest flight attendants beginning in 1948, also serving in the Korean Airlift. She married William H. Byrd in 1952, an aircraft engineer six years her senior. She quit her job as a flight attendant after their marriage. They had two children together. She got another job as the grand hostess of Los Angeles International Airport.

== Contactee claims ==
About the same time as her marriage to Byrd, Lee developed an interest in flying saucers. The year after her marriage, in 1953, Lee claimed she began to receive messages from the "saucer brothers" through automatic writing, which later became telepathic communication. These messages were received while she was at work, and she came into contact with several occult groups as a result. She said the entity communicating with her was J. W., from the planet Venus, where his race had abandoned vocal communication for telepathy. She said it had started while on coffee break, and then heard a voice saying she had "made contact", which told her to go outside and look up, where she saw a flying saucer.

She founded the Cosmon Research Foundation in 1959, and she held talks on flying saucers. They were headquartered in Torrance, California. Local newspapers described her as a "space cultist" or as a cult leader. According to her husband, after he had urged her to visit a psychiatrist, she was diagnosed with paranoia in 1959. The psychiatrist believed she would not respond well to treatment, and she refused consultations after her diagnosis. Her movement had 2000 followers, and owned a 10-acre Californian retreat. Her husband disapproved and did not involve himself.

In September 1959, she was set to attend the Northern California Spacecraft Convention. She became a well known figure in the contactee movement in the 1960s. She published a book, Why We Are Here! (1959); the book has some theosophical elements, with a "space command hierarchy". A second J.W. book was published in 1962, The Changing Conditions of Your World! (1962). Both her books contained material alleged to be passed on from her alien communicators, and were both published by Cosmon.

== Death ==
Later that year, with Hedy Hood (who had many of the same ideas), Lee visited Washington, D.C. to attempt to bring her views to the attention of officials. However, after being rebuffed, she launched a hunger strike or protest fast. They booked a room at the Hotel Claridge where she fasted, telling others in the UFO contactee community that she expected to enter a coma resembling death, then "return" with renewed spiritual energy to carry on her "great work". However, the press were not notified of Lee's hunger strike until some time after it had begun, and she attracted no publicity.

After approximately 66 days without eating, she was taken to George Washington University Hospital on November 28, when her husband called the doctors there. She never regained consciousness, and died there on December 2, 1962 at the age of 36. According to her husband she died of a brain hemorrhage, though it was initially attributed to malnutrition. Her husband said he did not want to discuss her death in order to not help her followers. After Lee's death Hood was placed for observation in a psychiatric hospital, but was released by the next month. Her two children came under care of a local family.

After her death, several contactees claimed they could contact her from the beyond through a medium. This included Verity of the Herald of the New Age group and Yolanda of Mark-Age; both produced written materials claimed to be from Lee from the afterlife. The executive secretary of Cosmon said she was in "daily contact" and could "tune in" with Lee. They initially considered her a martyr, but she was forgotten by the movement when new people joined.

== Bibliography ==
- —— (1959). Why We Are Here!. Palos Verdes Estates: Cosmon Research Foundation.
- —— (1962). The Changing Conditions of Your World!. Palos Verdes Estates: Cosmon Research Foundation.
