= Manoel Jacintho Coelho =

- Born: December 30, 1903; Rio de Janeiro, Brazil
- Died: January 30, 1991 (aged 87); Rio de Janeiro, Brazil
- Writing career
- Notable work: "The Day of the Rational Culture"
- Notable awards: Medal of Honor of liberty (1986) Medal of Cultural Merit named after Jose Da Costa

Manoel Jacintho Coelho (December 30, 1903 – January 13, 1991) was a Brazilian writer and the founder of the religious movement Rational Culture.

== Life ==
Manoel Jacintho Coelho was born to a musician family in Rio de Janeiro. His father, Manoel, was a conductor and his mother, Rosa Maria, was a piano teacher. When he was thirteen, Manoel Jacinto was already a guitarist. The seven-string guitar has become one of its specialties.

At the age of eighteen, he joined the Brazilian Army, the 1st Heavy Machine Gun Company at the Deodoro barracks in Rio de Janeiro.

He worked for many years in the Ministry of Foreign Affairs, Itamaraty Palace, in Rio de Janeiro.

== Career ==
On October 4, 1935, he began the elaboration of the Rational Culture composed of 1,000 volumes and entitled "Universe in Disenchantment", which he would only conclude on December 5, 1990, shortly before his death. The books were divided into five parts:

- 1st - Work, composed of 21 volumes,
- 2nd - Replica, composed of 21 volumes,
- 3rd - Replica, composed of 21 volumes,
- 4th - Historic, composed of 934 volumes and
- 5th - Amarelões, composed of 3 volumes edited between 1935 and 1938.

=== Courses ===
The sixty-nine courses (subjects) covered by his encyclopedia are divided into two categories: those known to humanity, and those still unknown to humanity.

41 courses known to humanity:

1. Cosmogony
2. Celestial mechanics
3. Cosmology
4. Astrophysics
5. "Astrogenics"
6. Astrobotany
7. "Astroclimate"
8. Astrobiology
9. Astrology
10. Physics
11. Physical chemistry
12. Physiology
13. Physiotherapy
14. Geophysics
15. Electricity and magnetism
16. Energetics
17. Ecology
18. Biology
19. Age studies
20. Ethics
21. Anthropology
22. Anthroposociology
23. "Anthropagogy"
24. Ethnology
25. "Anthropomagnetism"
26. Logical and ethical humanism
27. Logic
28. Reason
29. Etymology
30. Etiology
31. Theology
32. Spiritualism
33. Human relations
34. Psychology
35. Psychiatry
36. Linguistics
37. Sociology
38. Mystical and dogmatic roots and traditions
39. Justice and reason
40. Metaphysics
41. Parapsychology

28 courses unknown to humanity:

1. The Rational World and its inhabitants
2. The Upper Astral and its inhabitants
3. The Lower Astral and its inhabitants
4. The true origin of humanity
5. All phases of humanity
6. Natural, astrological and artificial alphabets
7. Universal racionalization
8. The pre-existence and cause of existence
9. The meaning of life
10. The cause of human change from before to now
11. Pre-existence of men and women
12. Material and spiritual spiritualization
13. The true nature and the apparent nature of everything
14. Physical and moral recover of individuals
15. Electric and magnetic energies
16. Mediator rational and rational energies
17. The homeworld of humanity, including its map and compass
18. Rational immunization
19. The hierarchy of the world, space and inferior classes
20. The 21 eternities
21. Desenchantment
22. Transformations of nature
23. The cause of semen transforming into a living body
24. Two classes: Rational and irrational animal
25. Identity of the Rational class
26. Answers to all questions everyone ever asked but no one ever answered
27. The just and certain formation of the true genesis of everything's existence
28. The world that gave origin to this one

== Awards ==
He received several national and international awards, including the Inconfidência Medal by the state of Minas Gerais on April 21, 1986, and Medalha Doutor “Ulisses Guimarães”, the homage of the OPB - Order of Brazilian Parliamentarians - granted to Mrs. Atna Jacintho Coelho in memoriam of Mr. Manoel Jacintho Coelho - received on June 7, 2005.

== See also ==
- List of literary awards
- Rationality
