= Wakefield (disambiguation) =

Wakefield is a city in West Yorkshire, England.

Wakefield may also refer to:

== Places ==
=== England ===
- City of Wakefield, a metropolitan borough of West Yorkshire, England
  - Wakefield Prison, located in this city
  - Wakefield (UK Parliament constituency), located in this city
  - Wakefield Trinity, rugby league club located in city
  - Diocese of Wakefield, former Church of England diocese based in the city

=== Australia ===
- Wakefield, New South Wales
- Wakefield Street, Adelaide, in Adelaide, South Australia
- Wakefield Regional Council, a local government area in South Australia
- Division of Wakefield, an Australian electoral division

=== United States ===
- Wakefield, Alabama
- Wakefield, Illinois
- Wakefield, Kansas
- Wakefield, Kentucky
- Wakefield, Louisiana
- Wakefield, Massachusetts
  - Wakefield Historic District, listed on the NRHP
  - Wakefield (MBTA station)
- Wakefield, Michigan
- Wakefield (Holly Springs, Mississippi), a historic mansion
- Wakefield, Nebraska
- Wakefield, New Hampshire
- Wakefield, Bronx, New York
- Wakefield, North Carolina
- Wakefield, Ohio
- Wakefield, Pennsylvania
- Wakefield, Rhode Island
- Wakefield, Virginia
- Wakefield, Fairfax County, Virginia
- Wakefield (Washington, D.C.), a neighborhood
- Wakefield, Wisconsin, a ghost town
- Wakefield Township, Michigan
- Wakefield Township, Minnesota
- Wakefield Township, Dixon County, Nebraska

=== Elsewhere ===
- Wakefield Parish, New Brunswick, Canada
  - Wakefield, New Brunswick, an unincorporated community in Wakefield Parish
- Wakefield, Quebec, Canada
- Wakefield, Jamaica
- Wakefield, New Zealand
- Mount Wakefield, New Zealand

== People ==
- Wakefield (surname)

== Arts and entertainment ==
- The Vicar of Wakefield, a novel by Oliver Goldsmith
- Wakefield (band), an American rock band
- Wakefield (film), a 2016 American drama film
- Wakefield (TV series), a 2021 Australian television series
- "Wakefield", an 1837 short story published in Nathaniel Hawthorne's Twice-Told Tales
- "Wakefield", a 2008 short story by E. L. Doctorow
- Wakefield Cycle, a manuscript containing thirty-two Medieval religious plays

== Companies ==
- Calvary Wakefield Hospital, formerly Wakefield Hospital and known informally as "the Wakefield", Adelaide, South Australia
- Cushman & Wakefield, a commercial real estate company headquartered in New York City
- Heywood-Wakefield Company, an American furniture manufacturer
- Wakefield Press (Australia), a South Australian publishing company

== Other uses ==
- Battle of Wakefield, in the Wars of the Roses, 1460
- Port Wakefield (disambiguation)
- Wakefield station (disambiguation)
- Wakefield High School (disambiguation)
- Wakefield Hall, an office building in the United States
- USS Wakefield (AP-21) a United States Navy troop transport ship during World War II
- Wakefield, a term for the area following a laser pulse in plasma acceleration
