= Roseville =

Roseville may refer to:

== Australia ==
- Roseville, New South Wales

== Canada ==
- Roseville, Ontario

== Malta ==
- RoseVille (a.k.a. Villa Roseville), a house in Attard, Malta

== South Africa ==
- Roseville, Pretoria, a suburb

== United Kingdom ==
- Roseville, Dudley

== United States ==
- Roseville, Arkansas, in Logan County, Arkansas
- Roseville, California, the largest city with the name
- Roseville-Fleetridge, San Diego, California
- Roseville, Illinois
- Roseville, Iowa
- Roseville, Michigan
- Roseville, Minnesota
- Roseville Township, Minnesota (disambiguation), several locations
- Roseville, Newark, New Jersey
- Roseville, Ohio
- Roseville, Jefferson County, Pennsylvania
- Roseville, Pennsylvania (in Tioga County)
- Roseville, Virginia

== Other uses ==
- Roseville High School (disambiguation)
- Roseville station (disambiguation), stations of the name
- Roseville Pottery, named for Roseville, Ohio
