= Wakefield Township =

Wakefield Township may refer to the following places in the United States:

- Wakefield Township, Gogebic County, Michigan
- Wakefield Township, Stearns County, Minnesota
- Wakefield Township, Dixon County, Nebraska

See also

- Wakefield (disambiguation)
