= Wakefield–Lynnfield Rail Trail =

Under construction rail trail in Massachusetts, United States

Wakefield-Lynnfield Rail Trail
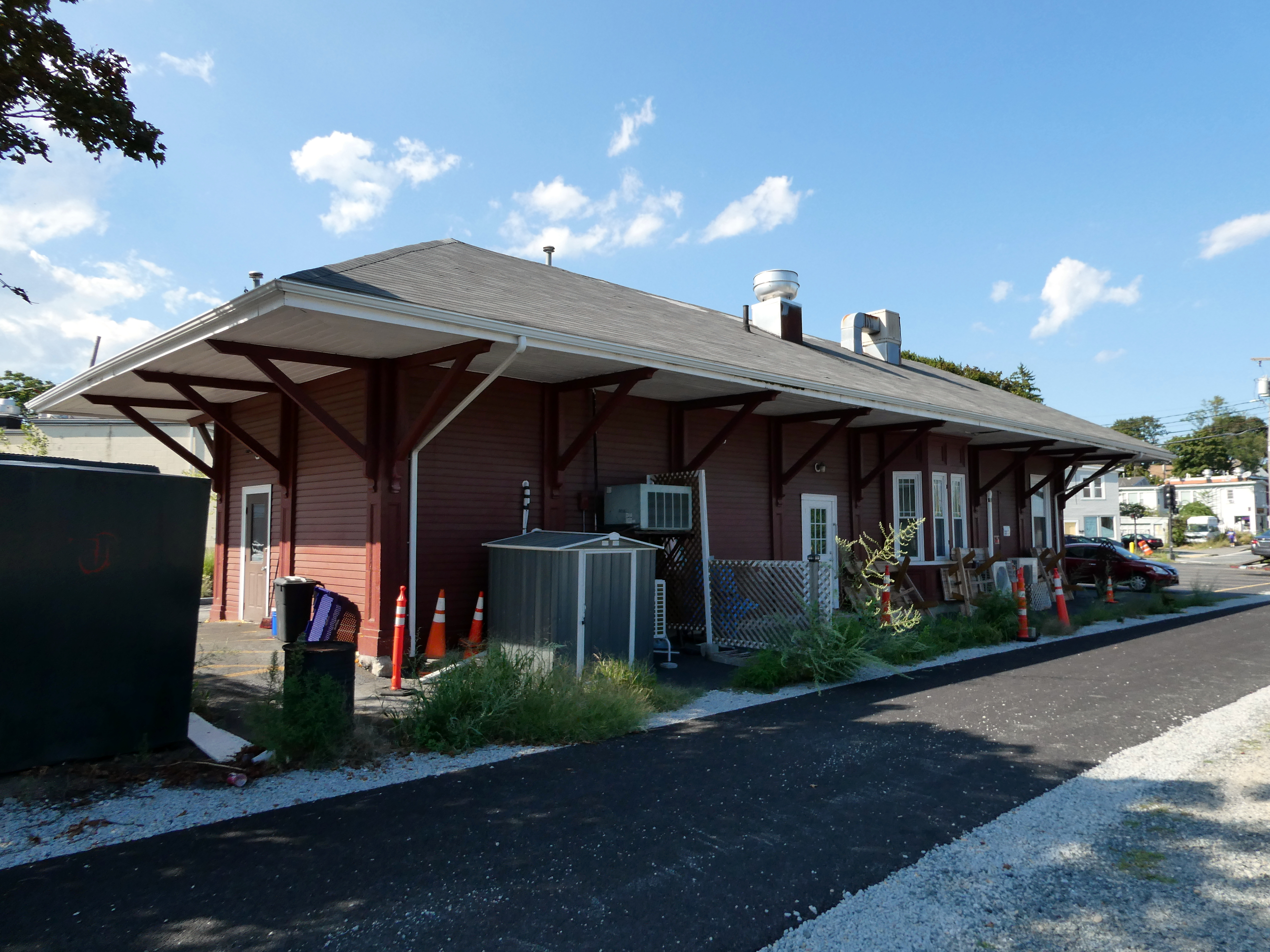
- Wakefield Centre station with paved rail trail after underground electric transmission line installation in Wakefield, Massachusetts
- Length: 0.91 miles (1.46 km), 4.4 miles (7.1 km) when complete
- Began construction: 2020
- Completed: TBD
- Use: Walking, bicycling, inline skating
- Difficulty: Easy
- Season: Year-round
- Surface: Paved
- Right of way: Former Newburyport Railroad, currently owned by the MBTA
- Maintainer: Wakefield and Lynnfield
- Website: http://www.lynnfieldrailtrail.org/

The Wakefield–Lynnfield Rail Trail is a partially constructed rail trail in the Towns of Wakefield and Lynnfield, Massachusetts. Segments of the rail trail in just one town are also known as the Lynnfield Rail Trail and the Wakefield Rail Trail. It follows the right-of-way of the former Newburyport Railroad, now owned by the MBTA and proposed to be leased to the towns. When completed, the trail will run approximately 1.9 miles (3.1 km) in Wakefield and 2.5 miles (4.0 km) in Lynnfield. The southwestern terminus is near Wakefield Station, and passes the Galvin Middle School, under Interstate 95 (128) into Lynnfield over the Reedy Meadow wetland, passes the Lynnfield Middle School, the Reedy Meadows Golf Course, and Lynnfield High School to the northeastern terminus immediately after crossing into Peabody, at Nichols Lane. It will connect to the Peabody Independence Greenway and the greater Border to Boston Trail.

== Trail Description ==
The Town of Lynnfield's project is 2.8 miles (4.5 km), including 0.3 miles (0.48 km) in Wakefield. It runs from Nichols Lane in Peabody adjacent to the Lynnfield border, through Lynnfield, to Fosters Lane in Wakefield. In October 2024, the Massachusetts Department of Transportation approved the Town of Lynnfield's request to split construction, into two phases, so that Phase 1 can be accelerated.

- Lynnfield Rail Trail - Phase 1, 1.8 miles (2.9 km), will go from Ford Avenue by Lynnfield Middle School, to Nichols Lane after crossing the border to Peabody. 100% design of Phase 1 is expected by January 2025.
- Lynnfield-Wakefield Rail Trail - Phase 2, 0.7 miles (1.1 km) in Lynnfield and 0.3 miles (0.48 km) in Wakefield. It will go from Ford Avenue, through Reedy Meadow and into Wakefield. It is under preliminary design. Phase 2 that would take advantage of expected revisions to the Massachusetts Department of Environmental Protection wetlands regulations, to reduce the required length of the Reedy Meadow boardwalk, which would reduce construction costs.

The remaining section in the Town of Wakefield would therefore be 1.6 miles (2.6 km). To date, Wakefield completed construction of approximately 0.91 miles (1.46 km) between Main Street and Salem Street in coordination with a National Grid Woburn to Wakefield underground electric transmission line installation within the MBTA ROW, which began in 2020. The trail head project to access these sections is substantially complete, but will remain closed until a license agreement is finalized with the MBTA.

== History ==
In April 2017, a Lynnfield Town Meeting article was brought to authorize the Board of Selectmen to execute a lease of up to 99 years with the Massachusetts Bay Transportation Authority for all or any portion of the former Newburyport Branch railroad for the purpose of establishing a multi-use rail trail. The article passed by just 1 vote, 342–341, the closest vote any veterans of Lynnfield politics could recall. In September 2019, opinion had shifted in favor of the trail, and almost 1,000 Lynnfield residents voted in favor 585–380 to spend $348,000 to fund Lynnfield's share of the final design of the Wakefield–Lynnfield Rail Trail.
