= Roseville Township, Minnesota =

Roseville Township is the name of some places in the U.S. state of Minnesota:

- Roseville Township, Grant County, Minnesota
- Roseville Township, Kandiyohi County, Minnesota

== See also ==
- Roseville Township (disambiguation)
