= Wakefield station =

Wakefield station may refer to:

- Wakefield station (Metro-North), in New York City, New York, United States
- Wakefield–241st Street (IRT White Plains Road Line), in New York City, New York, United States
- Wakefield station (MBTA), in Wakefield, Massachusetts, United States
- Wakefield Kirkgate railway station in Wakefield, West Yorkshire, England
- Wakefield Westgate railway station in Wakefield, West Yorkshire, England
- A former railway station on the defunct Nelson line, New Zealand.

== See also ==
- Wakefield (disambiguation)
