= Glacial Lakes State Trail =

Rail trail in Minnesota, United States

- Length: 22 mi (35 km)
- Location: Minnesota, USA
- Designation: Minnesota state trail
- Trailheads: Hawick; Willmar
- Use: Biking, hiking, horseback riding, in-line skating, mountain biking, snowmobiling
- Grade: Mostly level
- Difficulty: Easy
- Season: Year-round
- Sights: Glacial landforms
- Hazards: Severe weather
- Surface: Asphalt, grass
- Website: Glacial Lakes State Trail

The Glacial Lakes State Trail is a multi-use recreational rail trail in south-central Minnesota, USA. Developed from a former Burlington Northern Railroad grade, it traverses a landscape of lakes and gently rolling hills formed 10,000 years ago during the last glacial period. The trail currently extends 22 miles (35 km) from outside Willmar through the communities of Spicer, New London, and Hawick to the North Fork Crow River. Beyond that the undeveloped railbed is open for some recreational uses for another 22 miles (35 km) through the city of Richmond, but some of the original railroad bridges are closed. The developed section is continuously paved, with parallel grass trackways or shoulders for horseback riding along the whole route. Bicyclists can connect to a 3-mile (4.8 km) roadside route to access Sibley State Park.
