= UFO religion =

Religion which includes beliefs about aliens

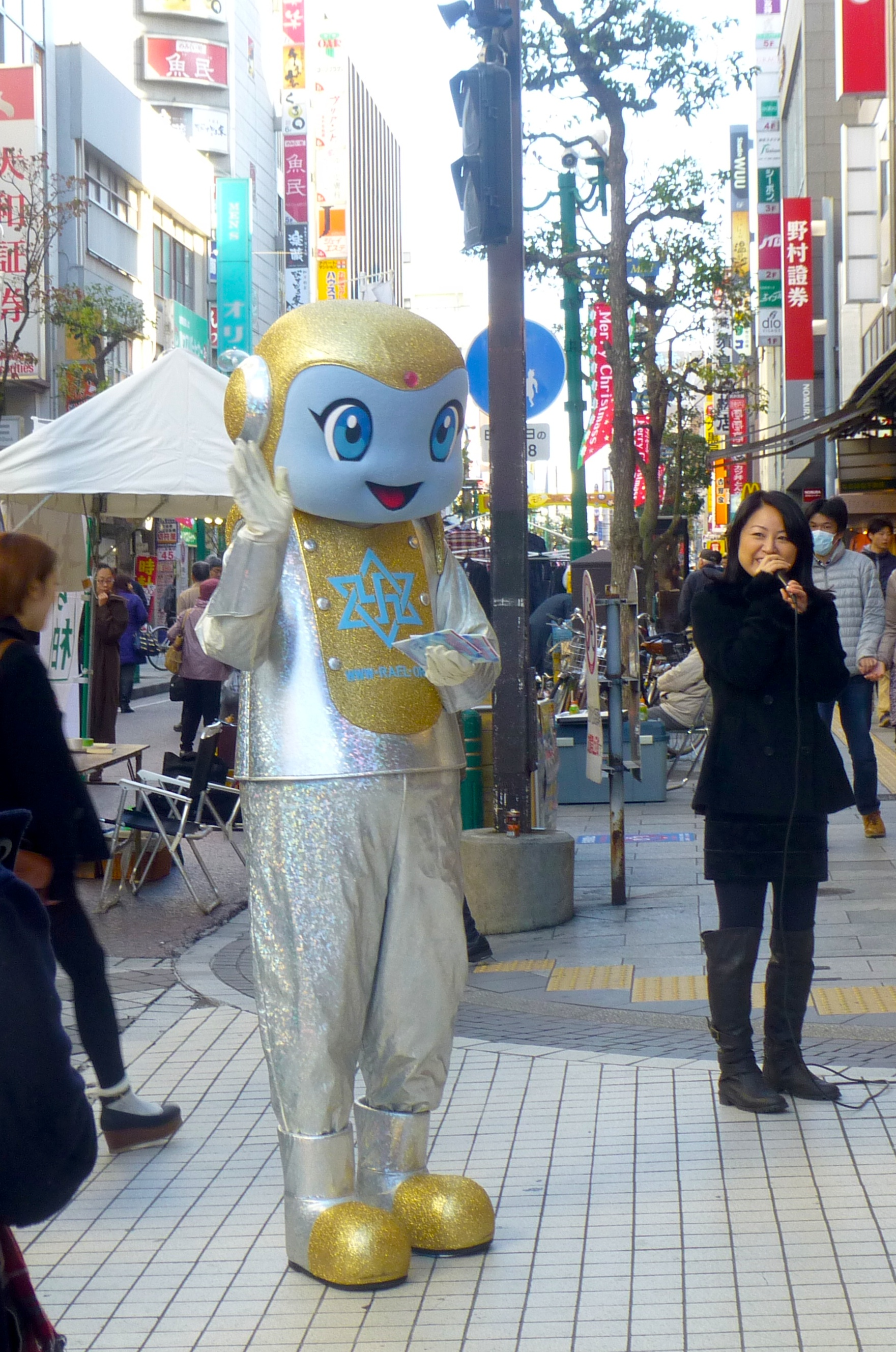
A Raëlian in an alien costume, Japan, 2012

A UFO religion, also called a UFO cult, flying saucer cult, or extraterrestrial religion, is any religion in which the existence of extraterrestrial (ET) entities and communication with them is a core belief. Typically, adherents of such religions believe the ETs to be interested in the welfare of humanity which either already is, or eventually will become, part of a pre-existing ET civilization. These religions have their roots in the tropes of early science fiction (especially space opera) and weird fiction writings, in ufology, and in the subculture of UFO sightings and alien abduction stories. Some historians consider the Aetherius Society, founded by George King, to be the first UFO religion, while others consider it to be "I AM" Activity.

== Summary ==
UFO religions generally deal with belief in communication with extraterrestrial beings. Some adherents of UFO religions believe that the arrival or rediscovery of alien civilizations, technologies, and spirituality will enable humans to overcome current ecological, spiritual, and social problems. Issues such as hatred, war, bigotry, poverty and so on are said to be resolvable through the use of superior alien technology and spiritual abilities. Such belief systems are also described as millenarian in their outlook. Stephen Hunt wrote of such groups that they were "one form of quasi-religion that perhaps borders on a more orthodox form of religiosity".

In these groups, individuals believe that communication between aliens and humans can take the form of physical contact, telepathy, and astral projection. Typically the groups believe that humanity will be saved by these aliens when humans are educated as to a better way to live life. Some of the groups believe that aliens will come to take those that believe to a more positive location. Often the extraterrestrial beings are seen to plead with humanity to improve itself and to move away from a society of greed and violence. UFO religions place an emphasis on spiritual growth and the evolution of humanity. A UFO religion can be formed before or after an individual claims to have experienced an alien abduction and been taken aboard a spacecraft. Within UFO religions, there is a belief that the supreme being or "evolved entity" did not ascend from Earth, but instead came from another plane or another planet and descended to Earth. Academic Christopher Partridge places UFO religion within the context of theosophical esotericism, and asserts that it began to be associated as "UFO religion" after the 1947 incident at Roswell, New Mexico. According to Partridge, most UFO religions still have many of the key points associated with Theosophy, such as belief in the same Spiritual Hierarchy, and he also draws parallels to New Age thought.

== History ==
UFO religions developed first in such countries as the United States, Canada, France, the United Kingdom, and Japan as the concept presumes the cultural context of a society technologically advanced enough to conceive of ETs as such and one in which religion of any kind is not discouraged or suppressed. The term "flying saucers" and the popular notion of the UFO originated in 1947. The study of UFO religions among sociologists, historians, theologians, scholars of religious studies and new religious movements began during the 1950s.

J. Gordon Melton identifies the first UFO religion as the group "I AM" Activity, founded by Guy Ballard. This was disputed by Christopher Partridge, who viewed it as a theosophical religion that was a precursor to genuine UFO religions like the Aetherius Society and George Adamski. The 1947 Roswell incident was a key point in time within UFO spirituality, increasing its prominence in the public mind. Partridge notes that within the thought processes of UFO religions after 1947, many of these groups maintained beliefs that extraterrestrial beings were "heralds of a new era".

== Notable UFO religions ==
Hunt describes the Aetherius Society founded by George King in 1955 as "probably the first and certainly the most enduring UFO cult". He places the Aetherius Society and Raëlism among the "most renowned" of the "flying saucer cults". Heaven's Gate and Order of the Solar Temple, which both died in mass suicides, have been described as the most controversial UFO religions. Scientology has also been considered one due to its Xenu cosmogony and the usage of space opera in Scientology doctrine.

== See also ==
- Doomsday cult
- Fictional religion
- List of new religious movements
- New religious movement
- Science fiction
