= Munson Township =

Munson Township may refer to:

- Munson Township, Henry County, Illinois
- Munson Township, Stearns County, Minnesota
- Munson Township, Geauga County, Ohio
