= Roseville Township =

Roseville Township may refer to:

- Roseville Township, Logan County, Arkansas, in Logan County, Arkansas
- Roseville Township, Warren County, Illinois
- Roseville Township, Grant County, Minnesota
- Roseville Township, Kandiyohi County, Minnesota
- Roseville Township, Traill County, North Dakota, in Traill County, North Dakota
