= Zion Township, Stearns County, Minnesota =

Zion Township, Minnesota
- Township
- Location within the state of Minnesota Zion Township, Minnesota (the United States)
- Coordinates: 45°28′N 94°42′W
- Country: United States
- State: Minnesota
- County: Stearns

Area
  - Total: 35.4 sq mi (91.8 km^{2})
  - Land: 35.4 sq mi (91.8 km^{2})
  - Water: 0 sq mi (0.0 km^{2})
- Elevation: 1,257 ft (383 m)

Population (2010)
  - Total: 335
  - Density: 9.45/sq mi (3.65/km^{2})
- Time zone: UTC-6 (Central (CST))
  - Summer (DST): UTC-5 (CDT)
- FIPS code: 27-72256
- GNIS feature ID: 0666073

Zion Township is a township in Stearns County, Minnesota, United States. The population was 335 at the 2010 census.

Zion Township was organized in 1867, and named after Mount Zion.

== Geography ==
According to the United States Census Bureau, the township (T123N R32W) has a total area of 35.4 square miles (91.8 km^{2}), all land.

Zion Township is located in Township 123 North of the Arkansas Base Line and Range 32 West of the 5th Principal Meridian. The village of Zion grew to become the city of Roscoe, which now straddles the township's eastern border with Munson Township.

== Demographics ==
As of the census of 2000, there were 388 people, 125 households, and 103 families residing in the township. The population density was 10.9 people per square mile (4.2/km^{2}). There were 127 housing units at an average density of 3.6/sq mi (1.4/km^{2}). The racial makeup of the township was 99.23% White and 0.77% African American. Hispanic or Latino of any race were 1.55% of the population.

There were 125 households, out of which 47.2% had children under the age of 18 living with them, 71.2% were married couples living together, 4.8% had a female householder with no husband present, and 17.6% were non-families. 14.4% of all households were made up of individuals, and 4.8% had someone living alone who was 65 years of age or older. The average household size was 3.10 and the average family size was 3.45.

In the township the population was spread out, with 31.2% under the age of 18, 9.5% from 18 to 24, 28.4% from 25 to 44, 21.1% from 45 to 64, and 9.8% who were 65 years of age or older. The median age was 34 years. For every 100 females, there were 133.7 males. For every 100 females age 18 and over, there were 130.2 males.

The median income for a household in the township was $45,769, and the median income for a family was $46,750. Males had a median income of $29,063 versus $23,750 for females. The per capita income for the township was $15,544. About 11.4% of families and 9.9% of the population were below the poverty line, including 7.8% of those under age 18 and 19.4% of those age 65 or over.
