= Marie Inez Hilger =

American Benedictine nun; anthropologist

Sister Marie Inez Hilger
- Born: October 16, 1891; Roscoe, Minnesota
- Died: May 18, 1977 (aged 85); St. Joseph, Minnesota

Academic background
- Education: University of Minnesota, Catholic University of America

Academic work
- Discipline: Anthropologist

Sister Marie Inez Hilger (October 16, 1891 - May 18, 1977) was an American Benedictine nun and anthropologist who was the first woman admitted to the Catholic University of America in Washington, D.C.

== Biography ==
Sister Marie Inez Hilger was born in Roscoe, Minnesota, October 16, 1891. According to her obituary from the College of Saint Benedict & Saint John's University, Sister Inez was the second oldest child of at least eight siblings: six sisters and two brothers born to Mr. and Mrs. Frederick Hilger. The Hilgers were the first settlers in Roscoe in 1889 after emigrating from Germany.

Sister Inez entered Saint Benedict's convent at the age of 17 in 1908 and pronounced her perpetual vows five years later in 1914. She taught for 25 years in elementary, secondary and college levels prior to starting a new career as an anthropologist. When Saint Benedict and Saint John's school planned to expand into a college, Sister Inez decided to pursue higher education.

Hilger received her Bachelor's of Arts from the University of Minnesota in American history and American literature. In 1925, she received her Master's of Arts in sociology and social works from the Catholic University of America. She also later received her Ph.D. from Catholic University in 1936 (or possibly 1939). She is notably the first woman to have matriculated with full privileges at Catholic University while enrolled for her Master's. She received her doctorate in her major fields of sociology, anthropology and psychology. After receiving her education, she embarked on a new career in research focused on the lives of children among several Native American groups of North America and Latin America, and among the Ainu people in Japan.

While at Catholic University, Margaret Mead, a famous cultural anthropologist and close friend of Sister Inez, sparked an interest in fieldwork in Sister Inez. Her fieldwork began with comprehensive studies of 12 American Indian tribes starting with the Chippewa Indians of Minnesota (1932-1966). Next she worked with the Arapaho (1935-1942) before she traveled in 1946 to Chile to study the Araucanian Indians. One of her final assignments in fieldwork was in Japan (1962-1963). In 1955, she became a research associate of the Bureau of American Ethnology. At the age of 74 in 1965, the National Geographic Society asked Sister Inez to study the Ainu people of Hokkaido while in Japan. She also carried out miscellaneous ethnological studies among several Plains, southwestern and Latin American tribes in her late career. Among them was a collection of "grandmother stories" she collected from the Blackfeet. Sister Inez received eight grants for research, authored 8 books and over 70 essays and articles during the course of her life. Three of her eight books were published by the Smithsonian Institution, Washington, D.C., as part of its research series in ethnology.

Hilger died in St. Joseph, Minnesota, May 18, 1977.

Sister Inez's papers are at the National Anthropological Archives.

== Bibliography ==
- Methods for the Promotion of Medical Social Service to Catholic Hospitals. 1934. Hospital Progress (October), Catholic Hospital Association, Milwaukee.
- Indian Women Preparing Bulrush Mats. 1935. Indians at Work 2(2):41.
- Indian Women Making Birch-bark Receptacles. 1935. Indians at Work 3(3): 19–21.
- A "Peace and Friendship" Medal. 1935. Minnesota History (September).
- Chippewa Hunting and Fishing Customs. 1935. Minnesota Conservationist, No. 2-3 (April), pp. 17–19.
- In the Early Days of Wisconsin, an Amalgamation of Chippewa and European Cultures. Wisconsin Archaeologist, n.s. 16:32-49.
- Chippewa Prenatal Food and Conduct Taboos. 1936. Primitive Man 9:46-48.
- Letters and Documents of Bishop Baraga extant in the Chippewa Country American Catholic Historical Society, Records, 47:292-302. 1936.
- Chippewa Interpretation of Natural Phenomena. 1937. Scientific Monthly 45:178-179.
- A Social Survey of One Hundred Fifty Chippewa Indian Families on the White Earth Reservation of Minnesota. 1939. Catholic University Press, Washington, D.C. (Doctoral dissertation, 251 pp.)
- Human Relations in the Sickroom. Trained Nurse and Hospital Review (November 1940.)
- Why Teach the Social Sciences in Schools of Nursing. Trained Nurse and Hospital Review (March 1941).
- Ahsahwaince, His Hundred Years. Mid-America (April 1943).
- Ahsahwaince, His Hundred Years. Catholic Digest (June 1943).
- Father de Smet. Christian Family (February 1944). Techny, Illiniois.
- Ceremonia para dar nombre a un niño indio chippewa. 1944 América Indigena 4:237-242.
- Chippewa Burial and Mourning Customs. 1944 American Anthropologist 46:564-568.
- The Catholic Sociologist and the American Indian. American Catholic Sociological Review (December 1945).
- Notes on Cheyenne Child Life. 1946. American Anthropologist 48: 60–69.
- Narrative of Oscar One Bull, a Sioux Indian. Mid-American (July 1946).
- Ethnological Field Study...the Araucanian Indian Child of Chile. 1946 Year Book of the American Philosophical Society. Pp. 202–205.
- Ceremonia para dar nombre a un niño chippewa. Sociedad de Geografia e Historia. 1947 Anales 22: 166–171.
- Research Organizations Interested in Ethnic Sociology: Addresses, Spheres of Interest and Types of Assistance Given. American Catholic Sociological Review (October 1949).
- To the Nurse: A Challenge. 1951. Nursing World (June).
- In the Interest of Chilean Archaeology. 1951. American Anthropologist 53: 429.
- Some Customs Related to Arikara Indian Child Life. 1951. Primitive MAn 24: 67–71.
- Menomini Child Life. 1951. Journal de la Societe des Americanistres de Paris 40: 163–171.
- Chippewa child life and its cultural background. 1951. Bureau of American Ethnology Bulletin, 146: 204.
- Arapaho child life and its cultural background. 1952. Bureau of American Ethnology Bulletin, 148: 253.
- Cien Años de Vida Benedictina en los Estados Unidos. 1952. In Revista Liturgica Argentina. Ano 17, No. 153. Pp. 88–90. (Trans. from the English into Spanish by Sister Amanda of St. Scholastica, Argentina.)
- Ethnological Field Study of the Beliefs, Customs, and Traditions in the Development, Rearing, and Training of the Araucanian Indian Child in Chile. 1952 Year Book of the American Philosophical Society.
- Contributions to Indian Rights and Resources, an Eight-state Conference at the University of Minnesota, November 9–10, 1953. Pp 107–109, 116, 119. University of Minnesota Press.
- An Ethnographic Field Method. 1954. In Method and Perspective in Anthropology, Papers in Honor of Wilson D. Wallis. Robert F. Spencer, ed. Pp. 25–42. University of Minnesota Press.
- Araucanian Child Life and its Cultural Background. 1957. Smithsonian Miscellaneous Collections 133: 439.
- Naming a Chippewa Child. 1958. Wisconsin Archaeologist 39: 120–126.
- Some Customs of the Chippewa on the Turtle Mountain Reservation of North Dakota. 1959. North Dakota History 26: 123–132.
- Hilger, Sister Marie Inez and Mondloch, Margaret. Emelia, an Araucanian of the Andes. 1960. American Benedictine Review (March–June). Pp 83–98.
- Una Araucana de los Andes. 1960. Notas del Centro de Estudiados Antropologicos 4: 5–17. Universidad de Chile, Santiago de Chile.
- Some Early Customs of the Menomini Indians. 1960. Journal de la Societe des Americanistes 49: 45–68.
- Field Guide to the Ethnological Study of Child Life. 1960. Behavior Science Field Guides, Vol. 1. Human Relations Area Files Press, New Haven.
- Hilger, Sister Marie Inez and Mondloch, Margaret. Rock Paintings in Argentina. 1962. Papers in Honor of Martin GUsinda. S.V.D. Anthropos 27: 514–523.
- Culture and Human Behavior. 1963. The Mainichi Daily News. February 3 & 4. Tokyo, Japan.
- Culture Changes in Japan. 1964. American Benedictine Review 15:4.
- Araucanian Customs: An Afternoon with an Araucanian Family on the Coastal Range of Chile. 1966. Journal de la Societe des Americanistes 55:1.
- Hilger, Sister Marie Inez and Mondloch, Margaret. Huenun Ñamku: An Araucanian Indian of the Andes Remembers the Past. 1966. University of Oklahoma Press.
- Japan's "Sky People." The Vanishing Ainu. 1967. National Geographic (February).
- Hilger, Sister Marie Inez and Mondloch, Margaret. The Araucanian Weaver. 1967. Boletin del Museo Nacional e Historia Natural 30: 291–298. Santiago, Chile.
- Mysterious "Sky People": Japan's Dwindling Ainu. 1968. Vanishing Peoples of the Earth. National Geographical Society, Washington.
- The Ainu of Japan. 1969. National Geographic Research Report. 1964 Projects. pp. 91–103. National Geographic Society, Washington.
- Notes on Crow Indian Culture. 1970. Baessler-Archiv 18: 253–295.
- (ed.) Die Reise nach Amerika, by Frederick William Hilger. 1970. Zeitschrift fur Kulturaustausch, (January–March). Institut fur Auslandsbeziehungen, Stuttgart, Germany.
- Together with the Ainu, a Vanishing People. 1971. University of Oklahoma Press, Norman.

=== Reviews ===
- Review of "Professional Adjustments in Nursing", by Eugenia Spalding. Trained Nurse and Hospital Review (May 1942).
- Review of "Principles of Ethics", by Thomas Verner Moore. Trained Nurse and Hospital Review (September 1943).
- Review of "Culture in Crisis: A Study of the Hopi Indians" by Laura Thompson. American Catholic Sociological Review (June 1951).
- Review of "Anthropology Today: An Encyclopedic Inventory" and "An Appraisal of Anthropology Today." 1953. American Catholic Sociological Review (October).
- Review of "Primitive Man and his World Picture" by Wilhelm Koppers. 1953. American Benedictine Review. Pp 375–376.
- Review of "Indian Villages of the Illinois Country: Historic Tribes" by Wayne C. Temple. 1959. American Anthropologist 61: 146–147.
- Review of "Introduction to Cultural Anthropology" by Mischa Titiev. 1959. American Catholic Review. Pp 167–168.
- Review of "Indians of the High Plains: From the Prehistoric Period to the Coming of the Europeans", by George E. Hyde. 1960. American Anthropologist 62: 704–705.
- Review of "Children of their Fathers: Growing Up among the Ngoni of Nyasaland", by Margaret Read. 1961. American Catholic Sociological Review (Spring). Pp 58–59.
- Review of "Ojibwa Myths and Legends", by Sister Bernard Coleman, Ellen Frogner, and Estelle Eich. 1962. Minnesota History (December). Pp. 192–193.
- Review of "Canoes of the Ainu", by American Educational Films and the Hokkaido Educational Commission. 1970. American Anthropologist 72: 1576.
