= Holdstone Down =

Mountain

- Holdstone Hill
- Location within Devon

Highest point
- Elevation: 349 m (1,145 ft)
- Coordinates: 51.21187°N 3.9777°W

Geography
- Location: United Kingdom

Holdstone Down, also known as Holdstone Hill, is a hill on the north coast of Devon, England. It is 349 metres (1,145 ft) tall. It can be reached via the South West Coast Path.

The Aetherius Society considers it to be one of its 19 holy mountains.
