= Mederger Flue =

Mountain in Switzerland

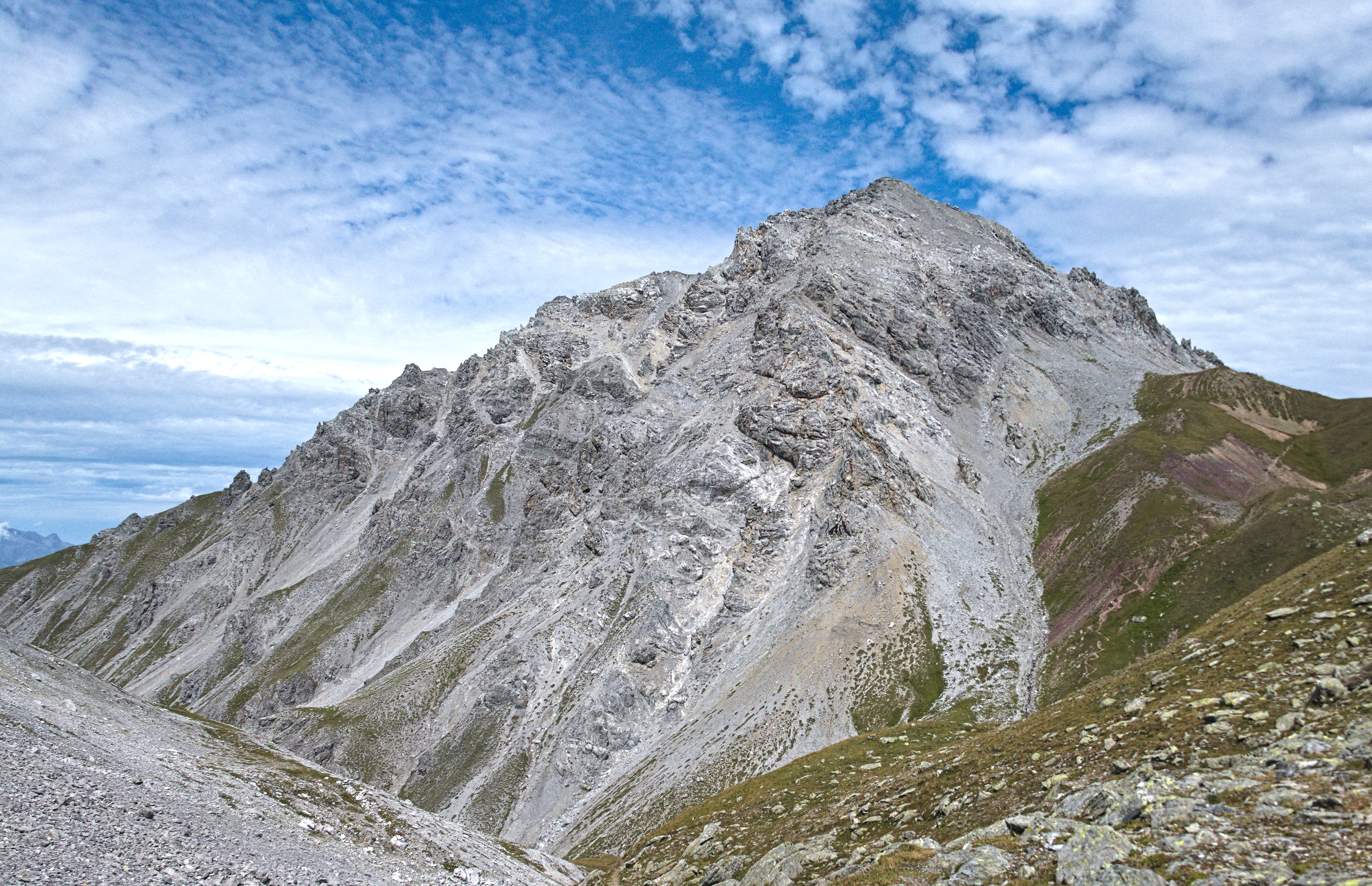
- Mederger Flue in 2020

Highest point
- Elevation: 2,705 m (8,875 ft)
- Coordinates: 46°47′26″N 9°45′4″E

Geography
- Location within Switzerland
- Location: Switzerland

Mederger Flue is a mountain in the of Plessur Alps of Plessur Region, Canton of the Grisons, Switzerland. Located just to the west of Davos, tt is 2,705 metres (8,875 ft) high.

The Aetherius Society considers it to be one of its 19 holy mountains.
