= Munson Township, Stearns County, Minnesota =

Munson Township, Minnesota
- Township
- Location within the state of Minnesota Munson Township, Minnesota (the United States)
- Coordinates: 45°27′N 94°33′W
- Country: United States
- State: Minnesota
- County: Stearns

Area
  - Total: 37.6 sq mi (97.5 km^{2})
  - Land: 34.6 sq mi (89.6 km^{2})
  - Water: 3.0 sq mi (7.8 km^{2})
- Elevation: 1,089 ft (332 m)

Population (2010)
  - Total: 1,466
  - Density: 42.4/sq mi (16.4/km^{2})
- Time zone: UTC-6 (Central (CST))
  - Summer (DST): UTC-5 (CDT)
- FIPS code: 27-44800
- GNIS feature ID: 0665065
- Website: https://munsontownshipmn.gov/

Munson Township is a township in Stearns County, Minnesota, United States. The population was 1,466 at the 2010 census.

Munson Township was organized in 1859.

== Geography ==
According to the United States Census Bureau, the township has a total area of 37.6 square miles (97.5 km^{2}); 34.6 square miles (89.6 km^{2}) is land and 3.0 square miles (7.8 km^{2}), or 8.03%, is water.

Munson Township is located in Township 123 North of the Arkansas Base Line and Range 31 West of the 5th Principal Meridian. There are two cities within Munson Township that have become separate municipalities: Richmond which straddles the township's eastern border with Wakefield Township and Roscoe which straddles its western border with Zion Township.

== Demographics ==
As of the census of 2000, there were 1,351 people, 496 households, and 415 families residing in the township. The population density was 39.0 inhabitants per square mile (15.1/km^{2}). There were 782 housing units at an average density of 22.6/sq mi (8.7/km^{2}). The racial makeup of the township was 98.37% White, 0.15% African American, 0.07% Native American, 0.44% Asian, 0.15% Pacific Islander, 0.52% from other races, and 0.30% from two or more races. Hispanic or Latino of any race were 0.52% of the population.

There were 496 households, out of which 32.7% had children under the age of 18 living with them, 78.6% were married couples living together, 2.6% had a female householder with no husband present, and 16.3% were non-families. 12.7% of all households were made up of individuals, and 3.4% had someone living alone who was 65 years of age or older. The average household size was 2.72 and the average family size was 2.98.

In the township the population was spread out, with 25.0% under the age of 18, 5.8% from 18 to 24, 28.6% from 25 to 44, 27.9% from 45 to 64, and 12.7% who were 65 years of age or older. The median age was 38 years. For every 100 females, there were 111.4 males. For every 100 females age 18 and over, there were 116.5 males.

The median income for a household in the township was $49,539, and the median income for a family was $51,974. Males had a median income of $32,350 versus $23,073 for females. The per capita income for the township was $20,446. About 2.3% of families and 3.3% of the population were below the poverty line, including 5.2% of those under age 18 and 10.8% of those age 65 or over.
