= Aetherius Society =

New religious movement founded by George King in the 1950s

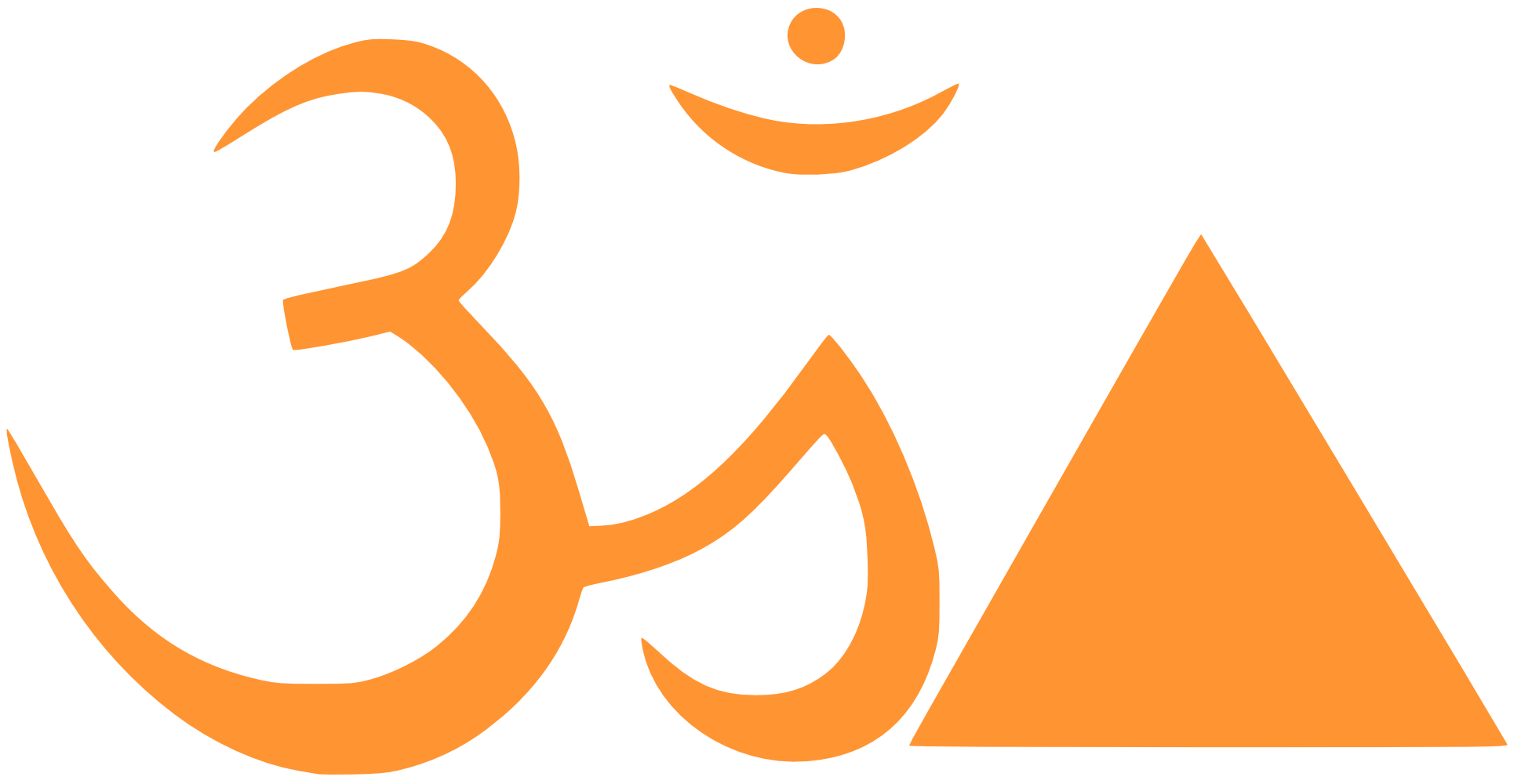
- Formation: 1955
- Type: Millenarian; Plural; UFO religion; New Age; Syncretic
- Headquarters: Los Angeles, California and London, England
- Members: unknown
- Founder/President: George King (1919–1997)
- Website: www.aetherius.org

The Aetherius Society is a new religious movement founded by George King in the mid-1950s, being the result of what King claimed were contacts with extraterrestrial intelligences whom he referred to as "Cosmic Masters". The main goal of group's adherents is to cooperate with these Cosmic Masters to help humanity solve its problems and advance into the New Age.

Mikael Rothstein describes it as a form of religious syncretism based primarily on theosophy and incorporating millenarian, New Age, and UFO religion aspects. Emphases of the religion include altruism, community service, nature worship, spiritual healing and physical exercise.

Members meet in congregations like those of churches. John A. Saliba states that, unlike many other New Age or UFO religions, the Aetherius Society is for the most part considered uncontroversial, although its esoteric and millenarian aspects are sometimes questioned. The religion may be considered to have a relatively conventional praxis, attracting members from mainstream society. The society's membership, although international, is relatively small. David V. Barrett suggested in 2011 that the worldwide membership numbered in the thousands, with the largest numbers in the United Kingdom, the United States (particularly Southern California), and New Zealand.

== Overview ==
The theology of the Aetherius Society is regarded as firmly based in theosophy, the Aetherius Society combines UFO claims, yoga, and ideas from various world religions, notably Hinduism, Buddhism, and Christianity. The society asserts itself as a plural or liberal religion, stating "nor does God favor people of one religion over another – and certainly not people of one country or race over another". Stefan Isaksson notes that it has "become a complex religious belief system that includes an extraterrestrial hierarchy of various spiritual masters and such concepts as universal karma and religious healing." The religion's goal is to prevent worldly destruction by improving cooperation between humanity and various alien 'masters', and by using 'spiritual energy' to improve the spiritual calibre of the world. The society has claimed that various disasters may be prevented or relieved by prayer, often aided by "Spiritual Energy Batteries" meant to store healing psychic energy The society also believes that it is to prepare the way for the "Next Master," a messianic figure who will descend upon Earth in a flying saucer, possessing "magic" more powerful than all the world's armies. The society is named after Aetherius, a being King claims to have telepathically contacted and channelled. Aetherius is believed to be a Cosmic Master from Venus, as are Buddha and Jesus.

== History ==
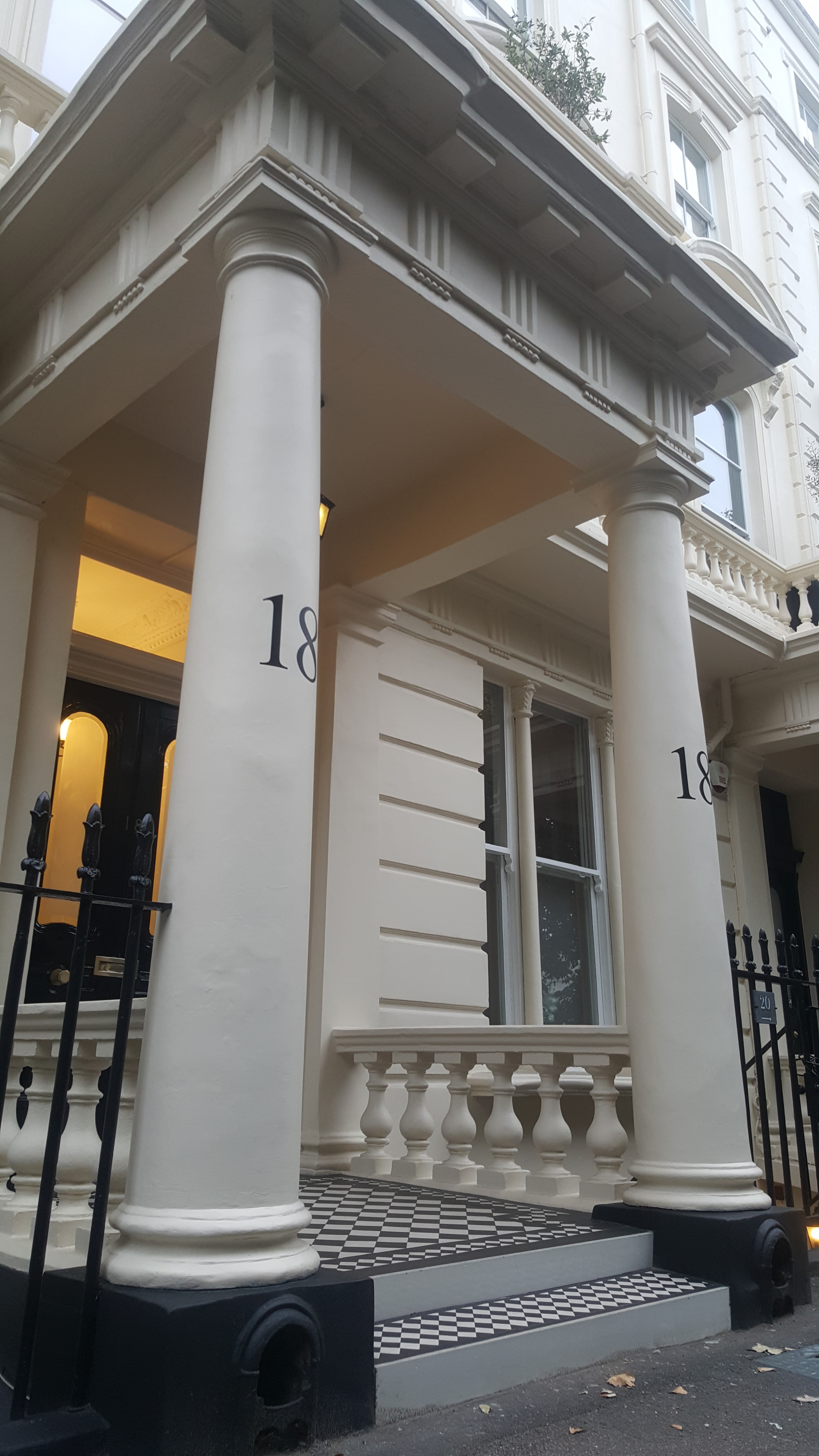
18 Clifton Gardens; George King's lodgings at initiation of the Aetherius Society.

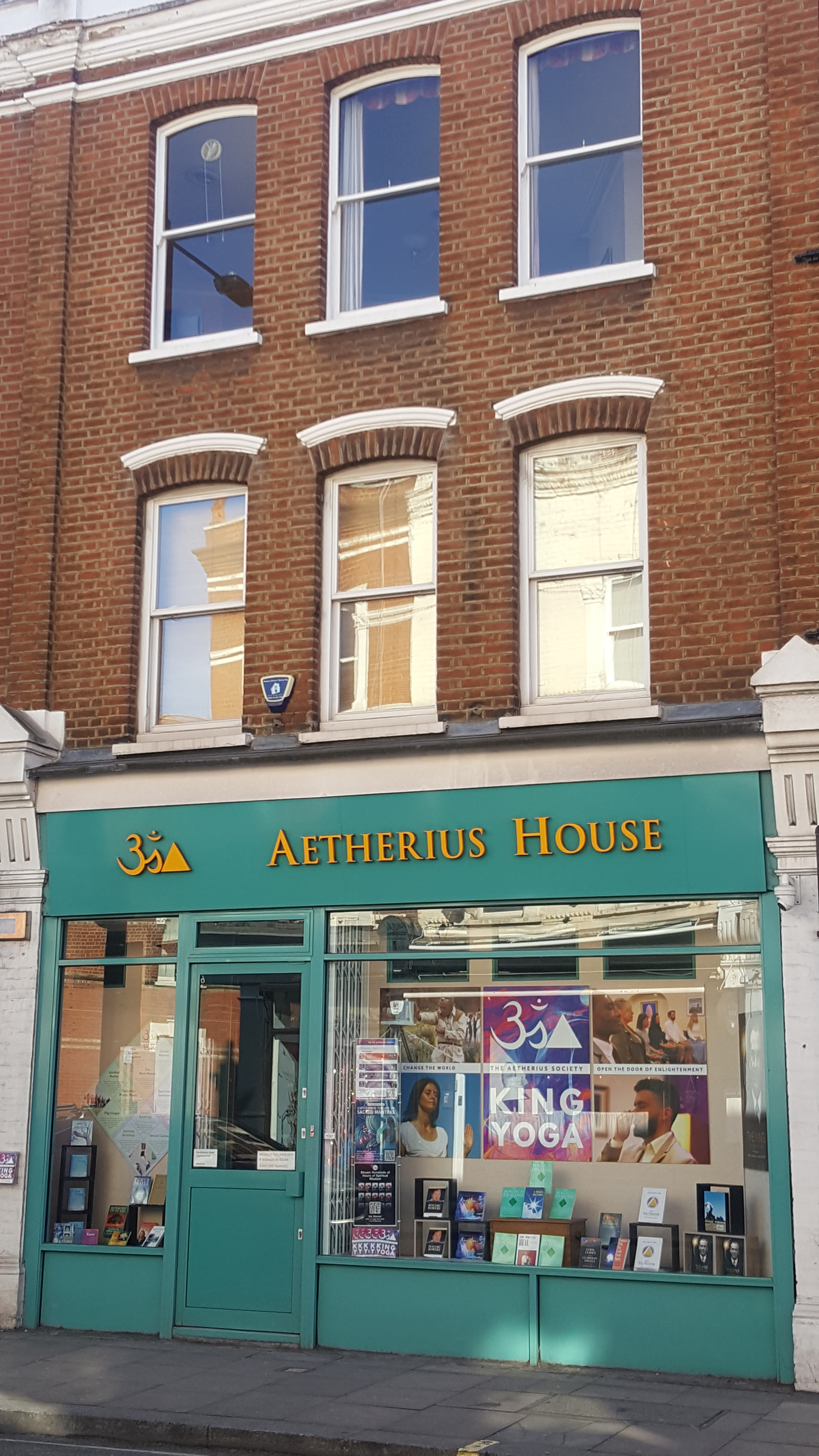
757 Fulham Road; London Headquarters since 7 July 1958.

The society's founder George King was born on 23 January 1919, in Wellington, Shropshire, England and brought up in a protestant family with strong occult interests. Before founding the Aetherius Society, King had been deeply involved in spiritual healing and had joined various theosophically-based metaphysical groups in London that were a marginal part of the religious scene. In 1944, he took up yoga, allegedly mastering bhakti, gnani and kundalini yogas and attaining the state of "samadhi" and, according to the Aetherius Society, developed psychic powers that allowed him to learn many of the secrets of the universe.

King claimed that on 8th May 1954, whilst living in a modest bedsit at 18 Clifton Gardens, Maida Vale, London, a voice told him "Prepare yourself! You are to become the voice of Interplanetary Parliament." A week later, an unnamed but supposedly world-famous swami (later declared to be Swami Sivananda) was reported to have entered King's locked apartment. King claims that the swami instructed him to form a group dedicated to helping the planet and that the swami further taught him yoga, prayer, and meditation. According to King, this training enabled him to receive telepathic messages from Venus, the first coming from a Cosmic Master named Aetherius. King rented space in Caxton Hall in London, in which he allegedly channeled Cosmic Masters and recorded their messages. Based on his experiences and these messages, King founded on 2nd August 1956 the Aetherius Society. Prior to, and during the early foundation of the society, King earned his living as a driver and security officer.

This version of events, however, is based solely on the Aetherius Society's hagiography, and not on external sources. Mikael Rothstein notes that a lack of objective, factual information is often a problem in studying religious leaders, even for new religious movements. The story of King, according to Rothstein, is part of an attempt (common to all religions) to portray their founder as an extraordinary individual to legitimize the religion.

According to the Aetherius Society, George King died in Santa Barbara, California, on July 12, 1997, at the age of 78. His death was not reported in major newspapers.

== Belief and activities ==
Richard Lawrence (London HQ of the Aetherius Society) describes the basic concept. (Interview 1986)

In Aetherius Society teachings, various religious figures come from different planets, and throughout history, Cosmic Masters, such as the Buddha, Jesus and Lao Tzu, have come to Earth to teach humankind the right way of living. They are regarded by the society as avatars. Krishna, for example, is from Saturn, which is the home of a "Cosmic Hierarchy" or "Interplanetary Council", while Jesus and Buddha are from Venus. The society, therefore, claims that these religions sprang from the same source and that their principles were identical. These beings are, however, spiritual beings on another dimension or plane, as the idea of corporeal intelligent life on other planets was known to be unlikely in the 1950s. The society's concept is that these beings exist on a spiritual level by maintaining a "higher vibratory rate", which can be lowered, and this explains the reported blinking in and out of UFOs. The society also refers to the vimanas found in Vedic and other Hindu texts, and to the Star of Bethlehem, as UFOs and examples of peaceful aliens that have been visiting to teach humanity throughout history.

King taught a belief in reincarnation based on the "Law of Karma," according to which humanity progresses, life by life, towards the goal of perfection. Everyone is destined eventually to become a Master and to continue evolving from there. The society claims that evolution also includes planet Earth, which is regarded as a living entity at a much higher state of evolution and importance than its inhabitants. They allege that because of the backward evolution of humans, the Earth has been under frequent attacks from evil forces from other parts of the universe and that the Cosmic Masters of other planets are fighting off a number of evil alien invaders. In Aetherius Society literature, the cosmic battles with evil forces or intelligence "bear some resemblance to the fundamentalist Christian concept of 'spiritual warfare', shorn of its imminent apocalyptic content."

As in other New Age religions, alternative medicine, spiritual healing, yoga, and dowsing are also accepted and practised by the Aetherius Society. It has also launched initiatives against pollution and nuclear power, and generally identifies with the ideals of the Green movement. However, the society believes that environmental and societal problems are only symptoms of a much larger spiritual problem that, once solved, would cure all other problems. This is the "spiritual energy crisis". King designed many items of equipment intended to contain and redirect so-called spiritual energy for such purposes.

Probably the best known of these is the "Spiritual Energy Battery". Its precise design and composition are not in the public domain. Its purpose is to hold a "charge of spiritual energy for an indefinite period". When connected to a "Spiritual Energy Radiator" (again designed by King), it can be "discharged". "Spiritual workers" pray, chant mantras, and "focus the energy" into the battery in which it is supposedly stored. The society believes that, in times of crisis, energy can be released in a concentrated form and manipulated by cooperating Masters to the area in need. King named this activity "Operation Prayer Power". The Aetherius Society claims that under the guidance of the Cosmic Masters, and with the aid of Spiritual Energy Batteries, they have prevented wars and relieved the effects of natural disasters. King taught that these spiritual exercises help to prevent worldly destruction.

To help with this, the Aetherius Society regularly engages in "Spiritual Pushes," in which they pray and meditate to draw prana to Earth from an orbiting spaceship known as "Satellite Number Three," thereby increasing the amount of spiritual energy available. They claim that this satellite is shielded from telescopes and radar. In "Operation Starlight", between the years 1958 and 1961, King and various members climbed eighteen mountains throughout the world, so that the mountains could be "spiritually charged" by the Cosmic Masters using King as the link. Members often make pilgrimages to these mountains, where they have painted the movement's symbol, believing they receive more power than they can send out to the world through prayer. They believe that service to humankind is the most essential yoga or religion in the modern day.

The Aetherius Society now regards King as an avatar and Cosmic Master. However, he did not make any claim to being either in his lifetime. The Aetherius Society also believes that King was the only person in the society to receive mental transmissions.

=== Eschatology ===
King claimed to have been contacted by many aliens, including Venusians, Martians, Devas, and the Great White Brotherhood to spread a message to aid humanity. This message exalted the promising future humanity has should Earthlings turn to better ways of living, while warning of the possible consequences otherwise. King taught that humans had the choice of self-destruction or the enjoyment of a New Age that was coming to Earth. He also taught that the Cosmic Masters had intervened via the Aetherius Society to help humanity into the New Age.

As Zeller notes in his chapter "Apocalyptic Thought in UFO Religions," King believed there would not be a catastrophic end to the world, but that the planet was on the verge of a new millennium of peace, enlightenment, and the Age of Aquarius; he also believed this would require human effort. The Aetherius Society's teachings share the individualism of not only other New Age teachings of the era, but of the Protestantism King grew up in (i.e., individual humans face the decision of whether to join the millennial kingdom).

The society also predicts the coming of 'the next Master' from space at an unspecified time, which is said to depend on human advancement and the balance of karma. It is claimed he will arrive in a spacecraft with great power and present his credentials to the leaders of Earth. Those who engage in war or ignore the 'Divine Law' will be removed from the Earth and reborn upon another planet where they will continue their progress. Those who understand the law will be left on Earth to enjoy the new millennium.

Zeller also compares King's call to correct living (with threats of suffering otherwise) to many forms of Christian apocalypticism, with King's claimed mental transmissions replacing the Bible as the standard for what that moral living is. The Aetherius Society's eschatology is millenarian and, like Christian apocalypticism and Manichaeism, features a strong moral dualism in that the society seeks to follow the positive forces of the white magicians, rejecting the opposing evil forces.

=== The "silence group" ===
The Aetherius Society claims that 'space beings' have contacted the leading governments of the world in many ways, but a group of individuals described by UFO researcher Donald Keyhoe in The Flying Saucer Conspiracy as "the silence group" have been deliberately suppressing this information so as to keep people uninformed, or misinformed, as to their true nature. According to King, "the silence group" uses fear and ignorance to control humanity.

=== Theology ===
The Aetherius Society's theology is theosophical and is also based on the continual evolution of all beings back to the source which is God. The society also refers to God as being "All in All, and All in All That," and the highest aspect of God as "The Absolute." The society believes that other beings exist that are so evolved compared to humanity that they are sometimes referred to as 'Gods' to distinguish them. "There is nothing but God in the cosmos, in varying stages of evolution. Everyone will eventually become a Master and will continue evolving from there." The society regards itself as a spiritual path rather than a religious movement per se. Its path contains various stages of spiritual evolution from earthly to cosmic. Karma and reincarnation are accepted by the religion as laws of nature. The society claims it is "not out to change existing religions so much as to add a cosmic dimension to them". Its religious services use both Christian prayers and Eastern mantras.

=== Criticism ===
Many of King's claims, particularly claims to various titles and honors, are questionable at best.

Simon Smith states that the Aetherius Society has to bridge a number of credibility gaps exacerbated by scientific and technological advances, and mentions some seemingly insurmountable problems facing its worldview, such as the non-existence of life on the other planets of the Solar System and scant evidence of spacecraft visiting Earth. The society uses the concepts of 'higher spheres of existence' to explain life on the other planets, and the 'lowly karmic position' of humankind to explain why extraterrestrials do not land openly. Hence the movement, while failing to keep pace with science and technology, has tried to explain consequent incompatibilities. However, explanation has become increasingly unnecessary for adherents as their acceptance of King's charismatic authority grows.

Rothstein suggests that the Aetherius Society touted a 1959 BBC television appearance of King as a momentous event, whilst in fact contemporary media coverage of King was mostly negative.

In 1958, the society's publication Cosmic Voice claimed to give details transmitted by the Cosmic Masters of an atomic accident in Russia, i.e., the Kyshtym Disaster, that was not known about in the West until 1976, when it was revealed by the New Scientist magazine. The magazine, after receiving a claim about the transmission from the Aetherius Society, entered a two-paragraph item under the title "Scooped by a UFO!", next to other news items intended to be humorous, such as a report of a "Dolphin Embassy." The Aetherius Society, however, interprets the New Scientist coverage as recognition of King's integrity, and admission by the magazine that they had been scooped by a UFO. The Cosmic Voice reported, early in its history, that King's mother was often a passenger in the flying saucers from various planets, was once in a Martian spaceship when she was introduced to a Venusian whom she recognized as "our dear Jesus", who solemnly declared of one of George King's books, (Note: The Twelve Blessings (1958)) "this book is now and forever will be – Holy."

King claimed that Aetherius enabled him "to speak all terrestrial languages"—although he seemed unable to respond when asked questions in Norwegian and French.

== Holy mountains ==
The Aetherius Society recognizes 19 holy mountains.

- United Kingdom
  - England
    - Holdstone Down (in Devon)
    - Yes Tor (in Devon)
    - Brown Willy (in Cornwall)
    - Old Man of Coniston (in Lake District)
    - Kinder Scout (in Peak District)
  - Wales
    - Pen y Fan (in Brecon Beacons National Park)
    - Carnedd Llewelyn (in Snowdonia)
  - Scotland
    - Ben Hope (Scotland's most northerly Munro)
    - Creag an Leth-choin (in Cairngorms National Park)
- France
  - Le Nid d'Aigle
- Switzerland
  - Mederger Flue
- United States
  - Mount Baldy, California
  - Mount Tallac, California
  - Castle Peak, Colorado
  - Mount Adams, New Hampshire
- Tanzania
  - Mount Kilimanjaro
- Australia
  - Mount Kosciuszko (in Kosciuszko National Park)
  - Rams Head (in Kosciuszko National Park)
- New Zealand
  - Mount Wakefield (in Aoraki / Mount Cook National Park)

== Locations ==
List of locations for the Aetherius Society:

Type	City	Country
headquarters (American)	Los Angeles	United States
headquarters (European)	London	United Kingdom
branch (Eastern USA)	Royal Oak, Michigan	United States
branch (Northern UK)	Barnsley	United Kingdom
branch	Manchester	United Kingdom
branch	Auckland	New Zealand
branch (Eastern Nigeria)	Aba	Nigeria
branch	Warri	Nigeria
branch (Western Nigeria)	Lagos	Nigeria
branch	Accra	Ghana
branch	Takoradi	Ghana
group	Cantonments	Ghana
group	Ho	Ghana
group	Kpando	Ghana
group	Tarkwa	Ghana
group	Tema	Ghana
group	Benin City	Nigeria
group	Calabar	Nigeria
group	Festac	Nigeria
group	Ibadan	Nigeria
group	Owerri	Nigeria
group	Port Harcourt	Nigeria
group	Umuahia	Nigeria
group	Johannesburg	South Africa
group	Lisbon	Portugal
group	Berkshire	United Kingdom
group	Birmingham	United Kingdom
group	Bristol	United Kingdom
group	Derby	United Kingdom
group	Glasgow	United Kingdom
group	Llandudno	United Kingdom
group	Sussex	United Kingdom
group	Torquay	United Kingdom
group	Warrington	United Kingdom
group	Toronto	Canada
group	San Fernando Valley, California	United States
group	Miami	United States
group	Bridgeton, New Jersey	United States
group	Brisbane	Australia
representative	Cape Coast	Ghana
representative	Kasoa	Ghana
representative	Abuja	Nigeria
representative	Kabba	Nigeria
representative	Bath	United Kingdom
representative	Chesham	United Kingdom
representative	Cornwall	United Kingdom
representative	Kingston upon Hull	United Kingdom
representative	Kent	United Kingdom
representative	Leicester	United Kingdom
representative	Liverpool	United Kingdom
representative	Nottingham	United Kingdom
representative	Portsmouth	United Kingdom
representative	Surrey	United Kingdom
representative	Swansea	United Kingdom
representative	Tyne and Wear	United Kingdom
representative	Ottawa	Canada
representative	Victoria	Canada
representative	Arizona	United States
representative	Carpinteria, California	United States
representative	Santa Barbara, California	United States
representative	Santa Cruz, California	United States
representative	Tampa metropolitan area	United States
representative	New Mexico	United States
representative	Nellysford, Virginia	United States
representative		Mexico
representative		Japan
representative		Germany
representative		Italy
representative		Sweden

== Bibliography ==
=== Books ===
By George King:

- The Nine Freedoms
- The Twelve Blessing
- Visit to the Logos of Earth
- A Book of Sacred Prayers
- The Practices of Aetherius
- Jesus Comes Again
- You Too Can Heal
- Cosmic Voice (vol. 1)
- Cosmic Voice (vol. 2)
- Cosmic Voice (vol. 3)
- Cosmic Voice (vol. 4)
- Cosmic Voice (vol. 5)
- Cosmic Voice (vol. 6)
- Wisdom of the Planets
- This is The Hour of Truth
- Contact with a Lord of Karma
- Become a Builder of the New Age
- Operation Sunbeam - God's Magic in Action
- The Five Temples of God
- Join Your ship
- You Are Responsible!
- Karma and Reincarnation
- Contact Your Higher Self through Yoga
- The Importance of Commemoration - Spiritual Happiness
- Realize Your Inner Potential (with Richard Lawrence)
- Contacts with the Gods from Space (with Richard Lawrence)

By Richard Lawrence:

- UFOs and the Extraterrestrial Message
- Unlock Your Psychic Powers
- Prayer Energy
- The Magic of Healing
- Gods, Guides and Guardian Angels
- The King Who Came To Earth: A Biography (with Brian Keneipp)

Others:

- The Holy Mountains of the World by Rev. Charles Abrahamson
- Operation Earth Light by Brian C. Keneipp
- Power Prayer by Chrissie Blaze and Gary Blaze
- Workout for the Soul by Chrissie Blaze

=== Periodicals ===
- Cosmic Voice
- Aetherius Society Newsletter

== See also ==
- List of UFO organizations
- New religious movement
