= Roscoe, Minnesota =

City in Minnesota, United States

Roscoe
- City
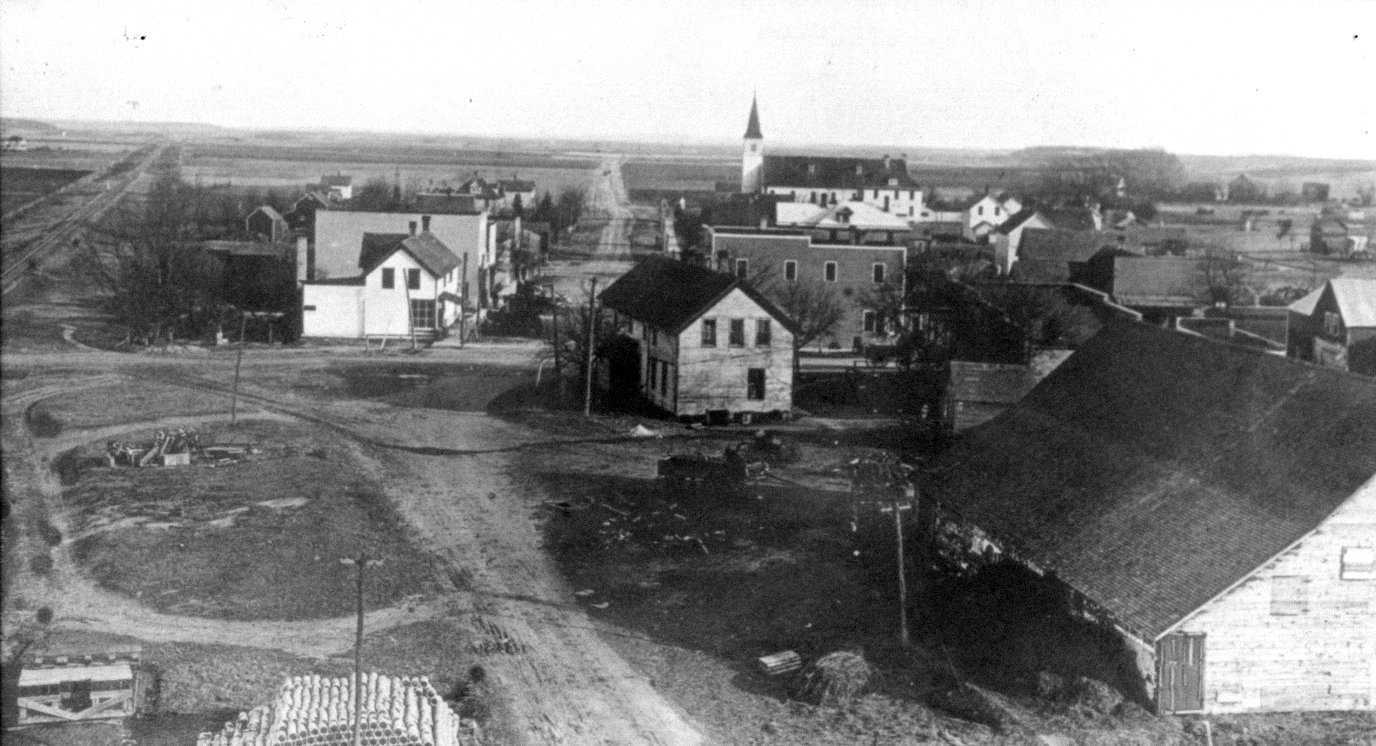

- Location of Roscoe within Stearns County, Minnesota
- Coordinates: 45°25′56″N 94°38′11″W
- Country: United States
- State: Minnesota
- County: Stearns

Area
  - Total: 0.62 sq mi (1.60 km^{2})
  - Land: 0.62 sq mi (1.60 km^{2})
  - Water: 0 sq mi (0.00 km^{2})
- Elevation: 1,171 ft (357 m)

Population (2020)
  - Total: 130
  - Density: 210.1/sq mi (81.13/km^{2})
- Time zone: UTC-6 (Central (CST))
  - Summer (DST): UTC-5 (CDT)
- ZIP code: 56371
- Area code: 320
- FIPS code: 27-55510
- GNIS feature ID: 2396426

Roscoe is a city in Stearns County, Minnesota, United States. As of the 2020 census, Roscoe had a population of 130. It is part of the St. Cloud Metropolitan Statistical Area. On December 7, 2016, Donald Kennith Albrecht was sworn in as mayor of Roscoe.

== History ==
Roscoe was originally called Zion. A post office called Zions was established in 1865. The Great Northern Railroad's line through the town was important to its early development, and in 1914 the name was changed to Roscoe after a railroad executive. The surrounding Zion Township still bears the original name of the town. The city has also grown eastward by annexing part of Munson Township.

A church on the site of today's St. Agnes Church, still the dominant feature of the Roscoe skyline, was dedicated on October 18, 1898 to serve the area's predominantly German-Catholic population. Roscoe formerly hosted a stop on the Great Northern Railway, but the tracks were abandoned in 1988 and subsequently razed.

The post office closed in 1995.

== Geography ==
According to the United States Census Bureau, the city has an area of 0.64 square miles (1.66 km^{2}), all land.

Minnesota State Highway 23 serves as a main route in the community.

== Demographics ==
Historical population
Census	Pop.	Note	%±
1920	182		—
1930	202		11.0%
1940	171		−15.3%
1950	182		6.4%
1960	168		−7.7%
1970	195		16.1%
1980	154		−21.0%
1990	141		−8.4%
2000	116		−17.7%
2010	102		−12.1%
2020	130		27.5%
U.S. Decennial Census

=== 2010 census ===
As of the census of 2010, there were 102 people, 48 households, and 28 families living in the city. The population density was 159.4 inhabitants per square mile (61.5/km^{2}). There were 56 housing units at an average density of 87.5 per square mile (33.8/km^{2}). The racial makeup of the city was 100.0% White.

There were 48 households, of which 14.6% had children under the age of 18 living with them, 47.9% were married couples living together, 8.3% had a female householder with no husband present, 2.1% had a male householder with no wife present, and 41.7% were non-families. 35.4% of all households were made up of individuals, and 16.7% had someone living alone who was 65 years of age or older. The average household size was 2.13 and the average family size was 2.75.

The median age in the city was 47.3 years. 17.6% of residents were under the age of 18; 5% were between the ages of 18 and 24; 21.5% were from 25 to 44; 39.2% were from 45 to 64; and 16.7% were 65 years of age or older. The gender makeup of the city was 53.9% male and 46.1% female.

=== 2000 census ===
As of the census of 2000, there were 116 people, 41 households, and 27 families living in the city. The population density was 180.7 inhabitants per square mile (69.8/km^{2}). There were 41 housing units at an average density of 63.9 per square mile (24.7/km^{2}). The racial makeup of the city was 98.28% White, and 1.72% from two or more races.

There were 41 households, out of which 46.3% had children under the age of 18 living with them, 51.2% were married couples living together, 9.8% had a female householder with no husband present, and 34.1% were non-families. 31.7% of all households were made up of individuals, and 17.1% had someone living alone who was 65 years of age or older. The average household size was 2.83 and the average family size was 3.63.

In the city, the population was spread out, with 30.2% under the age of 18, 12.1% from 18 to 24, 19.0% from 25 to 44, 26.7% from 45 to 64, and 12.1% who were 65 years of age or older. The median age was 36 years. For every 100 females, there were 107.1 males. For every 100 females age 18 and over, there were 118.9 males.

The median income for a household in the city was $45,714, and the median income for a family was $47,917. Males had a median income of $27,500 versus $20,000 for females. The per capita income for the city was $13,931. There were 3.2% of families and 6.8% of the population living below the poverty line, including no under eighteens and 37.5% of those over 64.

== Notable person ==
- Marie Inez Hilger (1891-1977), Benedictine nun and anthropologist
