= Port Wakefield =

Port Wakefield may refer to:

== Australia ==
- Port Wakefield, South Australia, a town and locality
- Port Wakefield railway line, part of the now-closed Balaklava-Moonta railway line in South Australia
- Port Wakefield Circuit, a former motor racing circuit in South Australia
- Port Wakefield Road, a major highway in South Australia
- District Council of Port Wakefield, a former local government area in South Australia

== United States ==
- Port Wakefield, Alaska, a ghost town

== See also ==
- Wakefield (disambiguation)
