= Wakefield Centre station =

- Center Depot
- U.S. National Register of Historic Places
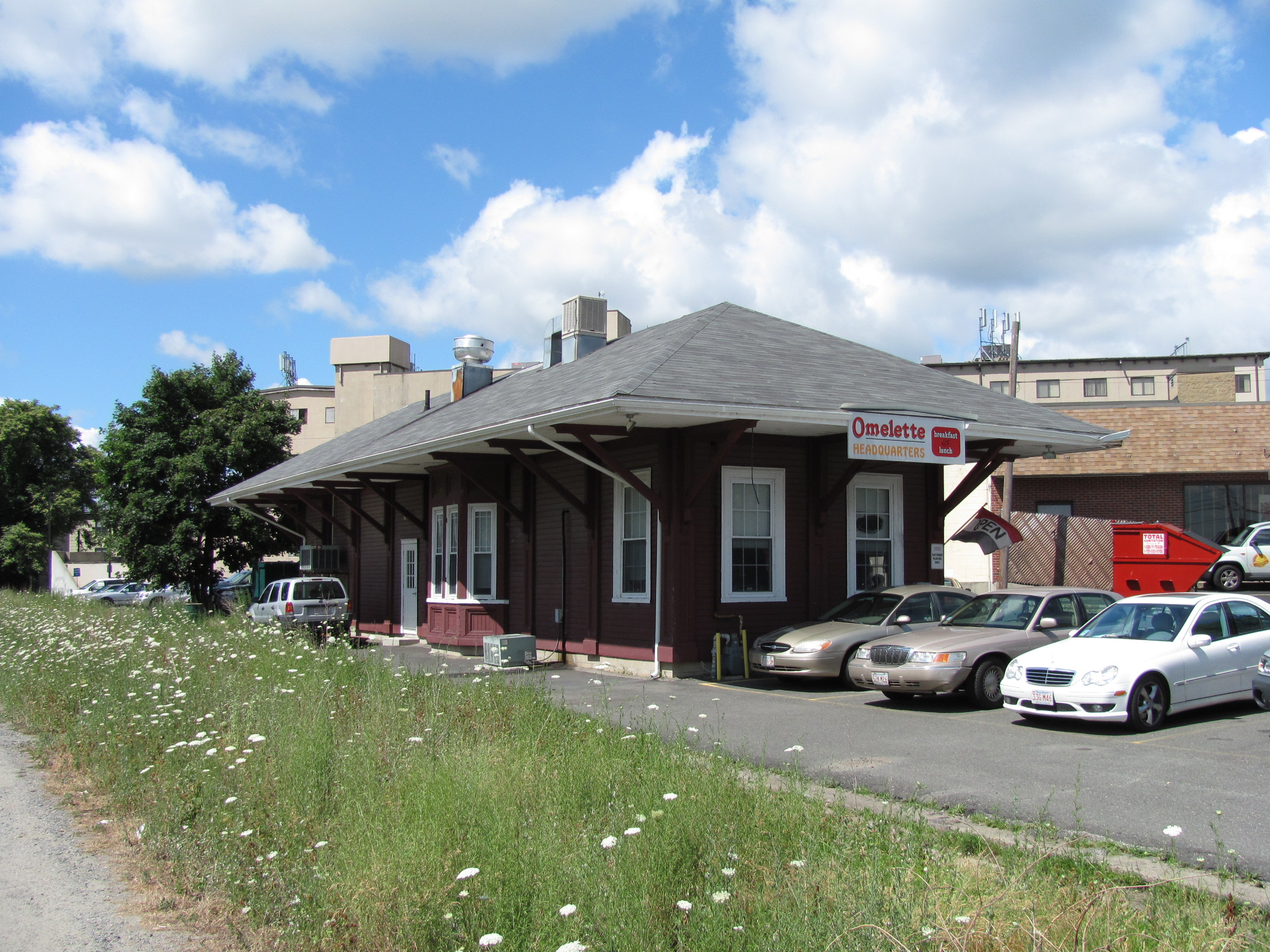
- Center Depot on Water Street

- Location within Massachusetts Location within the United States
- Location: 57 Water Street, Wakefield, Massachusetts
- Coordinates: 42°30′9″N 71°4′5″W
- MPS: Wakefield MRA
- NRHP reference No.: 89000693
- Added to NRHP: July 6, 1989

Wakefield Centre station is a former railway station at 57 Water Street (Route 129) in Wakefield, Massachusetts. Built in the early 1870s, it is a surviving element of the railroad infrastructure that enabled Wakefield's growth as an industrial center in the late 19th century. The depot was added to the National Register of Historic Places in 1989 as Centre Depot. As of 2008, the former depot serves as a restaurant. Today, it is a stop on the Wakefield-Lynnfield Rail Trail in progress.

== Description and history ==
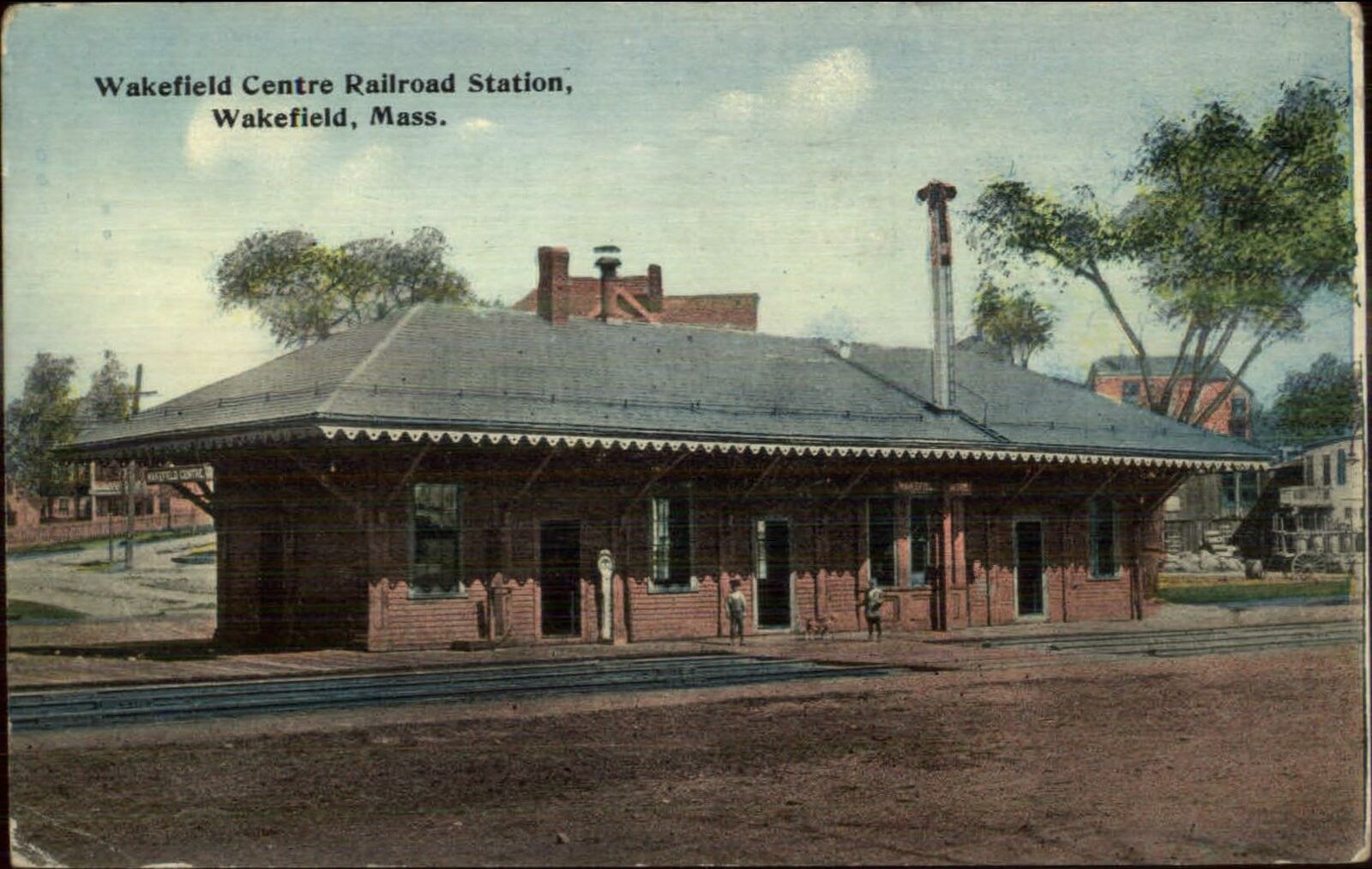
1913 postcard of the station

The station building is located on the south side of Water Street, east of Main Street, and on the west side of a now-abandoned railroad right of way. It is a single-story wood-frame structure, rectangular in plan, with a hip roof that has deep eaves supported by large knee braces, which are set in paneled pilasters on the walls. A polygonal bay projects on the track-facing facade, that would have been used by a telegraph operator or ticket agent.

The railroad was built through Wakefield around 1850, and had immediate positive economic consequences. One line was built north to Salem, and it is along this line that a station at this site was probably established around that time. A second line was built toward Haverhill, and is now used for the Haverhill Line of the MBTA Commuter Rail. The Salem line was used by two of Wakefield's major manufacturers, the Wakefield Rattan Company, and the L. B. Evans Shoe Company. The present station first appears on city maps in 1874, suggesting a construction date between then and 1870.

The former station building was converted to a restaurant by 1962. The exterior was restored to its original red-and-white colors based on a 1917 postcard.

== See also ==
- Wakefield station (MBTA), which can be found west of this station.
- National Register of Historic Places listings in Wakefield, Massachusetts
- National Register of Historic Places listings in Middlesex County, Massachusetts
