= Creag an Leth-choin =

Mountain

- Lurcher's Crag
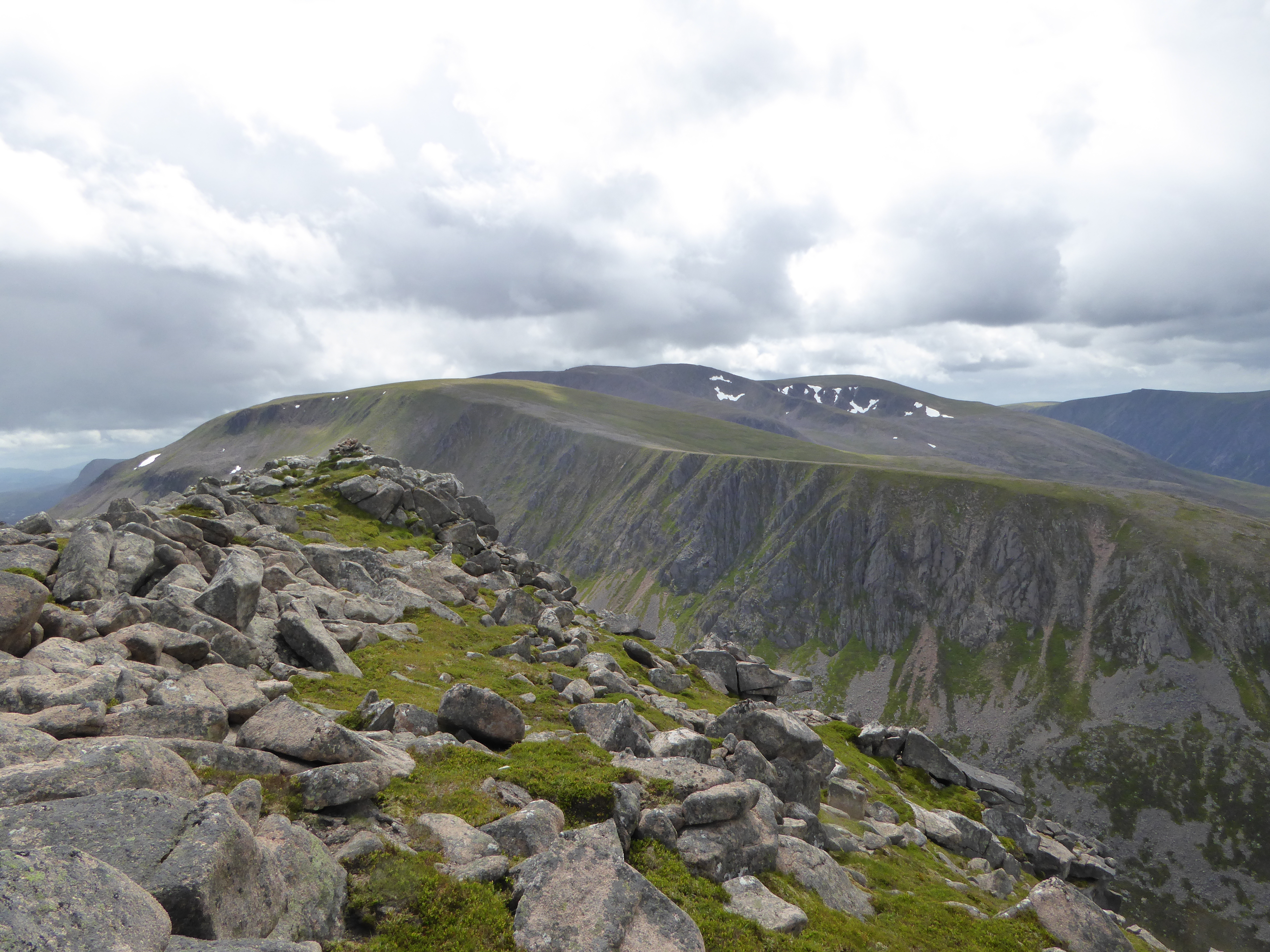

Highest point
- Elevation: 1,053 m (3,455 ft)
- Coordinates: 57.10944°N 3.70488°W

Geography
- Location within Scotland
- Location: United Kingdom

Creag an Leth-choin, also known as Lurcher's Crag, is a summit in Cairngorms National Park, Scotland, United Kingdom. It is 1,053 metres (3,455 ft) high.

The Aetherius Society considers it to be one of its 19 holy mountains.
