= Mount Wakefield =

Mountain

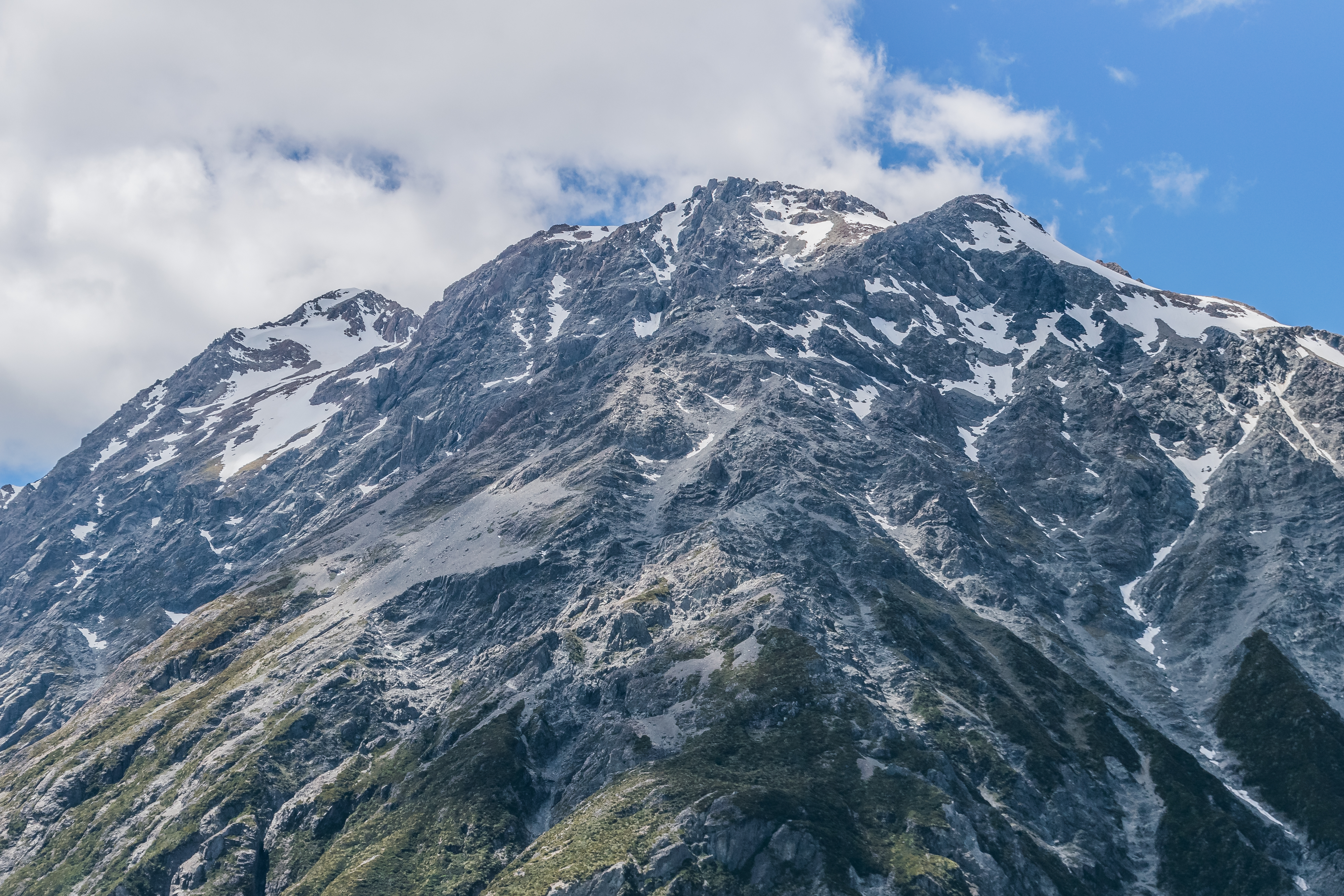
- Mount Wakefield as seen from Kea Point, in Aoraki / Mount Cook National Park

Highest point
- Elevation: 2,058 m (6,752 ft)
- Coordinates: 43°41′35″S 170°7′26″E

Geography
- Location within New Zealand
- Location: New Zealand

Mount Wakefield is a mountain in Aoraki / Mount Cook National Park, South Island, New Zealand. It is 2,058 metres (6,752 ft) high.

The Mountain is named after Edward Gibbon Wakefield.

Māori named the slopes and fans of debris of the mountain Kirikiri katata, kirikiri means stones or shingle; katata means split open.

== Aetherius Society ==
The Aetherius Society considers it to be one of its 19 holy mountains.

According to the Aetherius Society, Mount Wakefield was charged with majestic spiritual powers by The Master Jesus, a Cosmic Master from the planet Venus. On Christmas Eve of 1960, George King climbed the mountain in order to act as a conduit for the power between The Master Jesus & Mount Wakefield.
