= Richmond, Minnesota =

City in Minnesota, United States

Richmond
- City
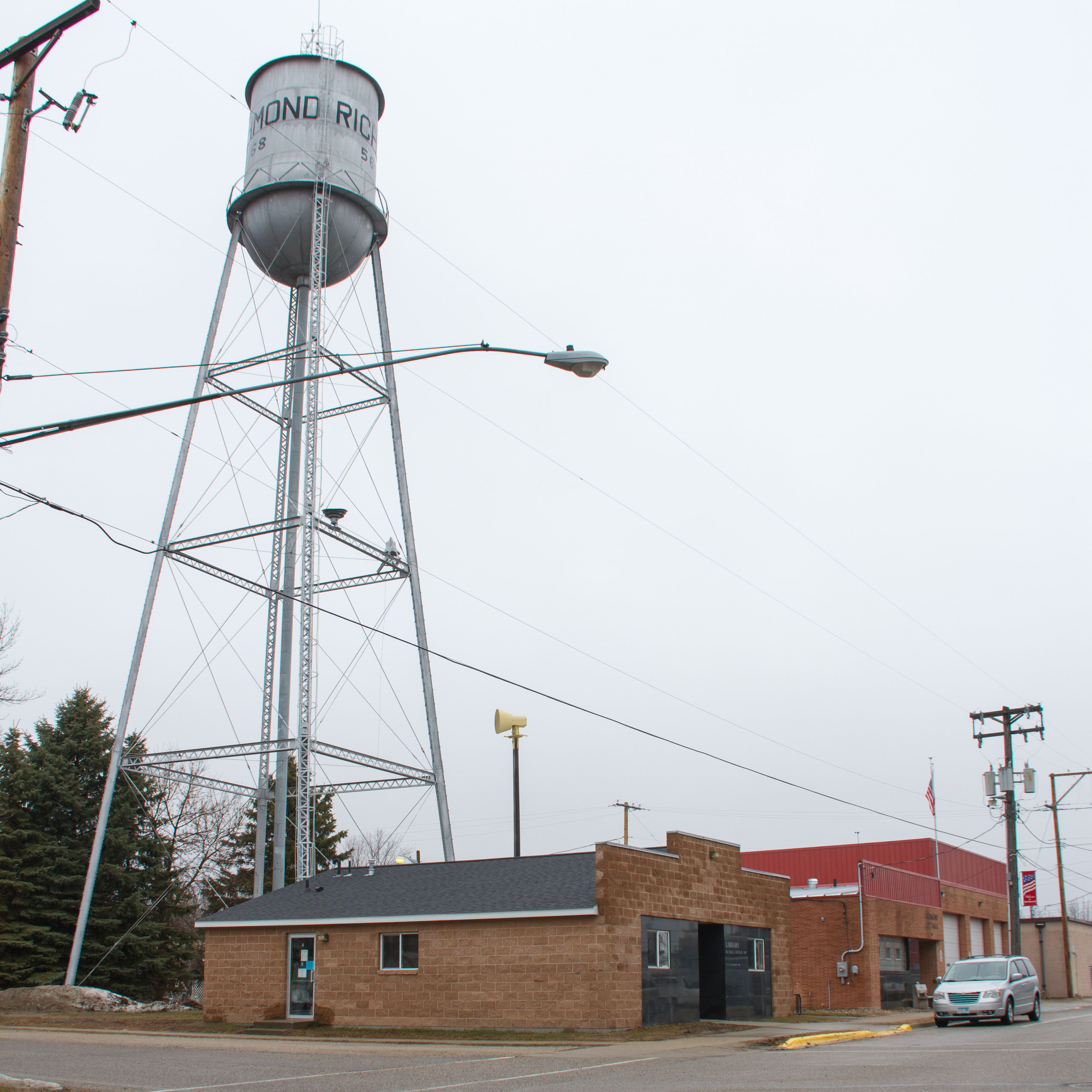
- Richmond's Water Tower, City Library, City Hall, Tornado Siren, and Fire Station
- Motto: "On The Horseshoe Chain Of Lakes"
- Location of Richmond within Stearns County, Minnesota
- Coordinates: 45°27′17″N 94°30′49″W
- Country: United States
- State: Minnesota
- County: Stearns

Area
  - Total: 1.21 sq mi (3.14 km^{2})
  - Land: 1.19 sq mi (3.09 km^{2})
  - Water: 0.019 sq mi (0.05 km^{2})
- Elevation: 1,119 ft (341 m)

Population (2020)
  - Total: 1,475
  - Density: 1,237.0/sq mi (477.59/km^{2})
- Time zone: UTC-6 (Central (CST))
  - Summer (DST): UTC-5 (CDT)
- ZIP code: 56368
- Area code: 320
- FIPS code: 27-54268
- GNIS feature ID: 2396367
- Website: www.ci.richmond.mn.us

Richmond is a city in Stearns County, Minnesota, United States. The population was 1,475 at the 2020 census. Richmond is part of the St. Cloud, Minnesota metropolitan area.

== History ==
Richmond was platted in 1856 by Reuben Richardson, a farmer from Sauk Rapids who later served in Minnesota Legislature. The name "Richmond" may come from the surname of an early settler, the surname of Richardson's wife, or an early surveyor. The original plat was a seven block by seven block square piece of land. Two years later, land owned by G.H. Brauning (also spelled Bruening), on the eastern side of the town, was added to Richmond's plat. The town was incorporated in 1890, but went by the name Torah, because there was another town in southeastern Minnesota named Richmond. The same year of its incorporation, a Great Northern Railway station was built. The town's post office and railroad station was named Torah until 1909, when the other Richmond's post office closed. Following this, the name changed to Richmond, a name that locals identified with.

The pontoon boat was invented in Richmond in the 1950s by Ambrose Weeres, who was involved in the milling business, and Edwin Torborg, a farmer who manufactured feed mixers.

== Geography and transportation ==
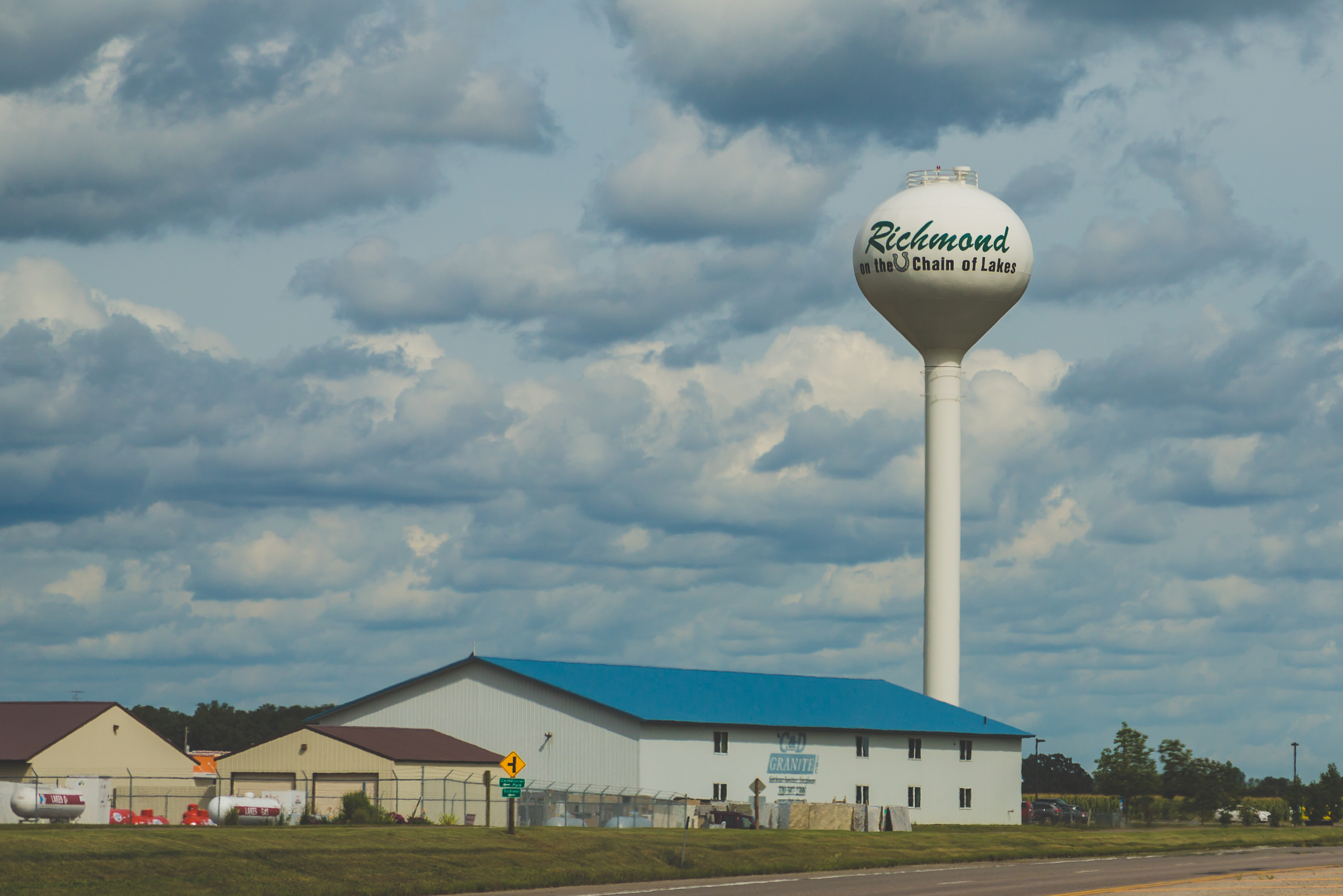
Richmond's eastern end, featuring a water tower with the town's motto

According to the United States Census Bureau, the city has a total area of 1.05 square miles (2.72 km^{2}); 1.03 square miles (2.67 km^{2}) is land and 0.02 square miles (0.05 km^{2}) is water.

When first platted, Richmond was within Munson Township. Richmond has since grown to become a separate municipality that has also annexed portions of Wakefield Township. Richmond serves as the northern terminus for State Highway 22, with the route ending when it connects with State Highway 23. Richmond is located about 15 miles west of Interstate 94 following State Highway 23. Glacial Lakes State Trail also runs through Richmond and connects it through different towns all the way to Willmar.

The town's nickname, "On the Horseshoe Chain of Lakes", is a nod to a geographical feature of the town. The town is home to a group of over a dozen lakes along the Sauk River, with the largest being Horseshoe Lake, hence the name "Horseshoe Chain of Lakes".

Richmond is located in an area with many outcrops of granite. The area is known as "Granite Country", as the material has been mined there for over 100 years and is home to around twenty different quarries.

== Demographics ==
Historical population
Census	Pop.	Note	%±
1900	600		—
1910	563		−6.2%
1920	651		15.6%
1930	603		−7.4%
1940	634		5.1%
1950	700		10.4%
1960	751		7.3%
1970	866		15.3%
1980	867		0.1%
1990	965		11.3%
2000	1,213		25.7%
2010	1,422		17.2%
2020	1,475		3.7%
U.S. Decennial Census

=== 2010 census ===
As of the census of 2010, there were 1,422 people, 583 households, and 392 families living in the city. The population density was 1,380.6 inhabitants per square mile (533.1/km^{2}). There were 627 housing units at an average density of 608.7 per square mile (235.0/km^{2}). The racial makeup of the city was 98.0% White, 0.1% African American, 0.6% Asian, 0.6% from other races, and 0.7% from two or more races. Hispanic or Latino of any race were 1.8% of the population.

There were 1,903 households, of which 28.3% had children under the age of 18 living with them, 56.3% were married couples living together, 6.5% had a female householder with no husband present, 4.5% had a male householder with no wife present, and 32.8% were non-families. 26.8% of all households were made up of individuals, and 14% had someone living alone who was 65 years of age or older. The average household size was 2.43 and the average family size was 2.98.

The median age in the city was 39.4 years. 23.8% of residents were under the age of 18; 6.9% were between the ages of 18 and 24; 26.3% were from 25 to 44; 25.2% were from 45 to 64; and 17.8% were 65 years of age or older. The gender makeup of the city was 50.6% male and 49.4% female.

=== 2000 census ===
As of the census of 2000, there were 1,213 people, 483 households, and 943 families living in the city. The population density was 2,421.5 inhabitants per square mile (934.9/km^{2}). There were 1,098 housing units at an average density of 583.6 per square mile (225.3/km^{2}). The racial makeup of the city was 99.98% White, 0.02% African American, 0.00% Asian, 0.00% from other races, and 0.0% from two or more races. Hispanic or Latino of any race were 0.33% of the population.

There were 483 households, out of which 31.9% had children under the age of 18 living with them, 61.5% were married couples living together, 5.8% had a female householder with no husband present, and 28.8% were non-families. 23.6% of all households were made up of individuals, and 13.5% had someone living alone who was 65 years of age or older. The average household size was 2.49 and the average family size was 2.95.

In the city, the population was spread out, with 24.8% under the age of 18, 7.3% from 18 to 24, 29.8% from 25 to 44, 18.7% from 45 to 64, and 19.3% who were 65 years of age or older. The median age was 38 years. For every 100 females, there were 102.8 males. For every 100 females age 18 and over, there were 95.3 males.

The median income for a household in the city was $38,400, and the median income for a family was $44,464. Males had a median income of $29,315 versus $21,219 for females. The per capita income for the city was $15,995. About 4.4% of families and 6.6% of the population were below the poverty line, including 8.0% of those under age 18 and 11.9% of those age 65 or over.

== Notable people ==
- Bernard Brinkman, politician; former member of the Minnesota House of Representatives
- Joseph Gimse, politician; former member of the Minnesota Senate
