= Roseville station =

Roseville station may refer to:

- Roseville station (California), an Amtrak station in Roseville, California, USA
- Roseville railway station, Sydney, a railway station in Roseville, New South Wales, Australia
- Roseville Avenue station, a former NJ Transit station in Roseville, New Jersey, USA

== See also ==
- Roseville (disambiguation)
