= Wakefield High School =

Wakefield High School may refer to:

- Wakefield High School (Kansas) in Wakefield, Kansas
- Wakefield Memorial High School in Wakefield, Massachusetts
- Wakefield High School (Nebraska) in Wakefield, Nebraska
- Wakefield High School (Raleigh, North Carolina)
- Wakefield High School (Arlington County, Virginia)
- Wakefield Girls' High School, Wakefield, West Yorkshire, England
