= Wakefield (Holly Springs, Mississippi) =

Historic house in Mississippi, United States

- U.S. Historic district – Contributing property
- Location within Mississippi Location within the United States
- Location: Salem Avenue, Holly Springs, Mississippi, U.S.
- Coordinates: 34°46′17.5″N 89°26′10.3″W
- Built: 1858
- Architectural style: Greek Revival
- Part of: East Holly Springs Historic District (ID83000960)
- Added to NRHP: April 20, 1983

Wakefield is a historic mansion in Holly Springs, Mississippi, USA.

== Location ==
The house is located in Holly Springs, a small town in Marshall County, Northern Mississippi.

== History ==
The two-storey mansion was built with red bricks and completed in 1858. It was designed in the Greek Revival architectural style, with four Corinthian columns. It was built for Joel E. Wynne, a "prominent merchant and contractor." By 1890, the owner lost the house in a poker game.

The mansion was used as the main setting in Like Unto Like, a novel by Southern author Sherwood Bonner.

== Architectural significance ==
As a contributing property to the East Holly Springs Historic District, it has been listed on the National Register of Historic Places since April 20, 1983.
