= Roseville, Virginia =

Unincorporated community in Virginia, US

Coordinates: 38°27′54″N 77°30′14″W

Roseville is an unincorporated community in Stafford County, in the U.S. state of Virginia.
