= Hawick, Minnesota =

Unincorporated community in Minnesota, United States

Hawick
- Unincorporated community
- Location within Minnesota Location within the United States
- Coordinates: 45°20′52″N 94°49′38″W
- Country: United States
- State: Minnesota
- County: Kandiyohi
- Township: Roseville Township
- Elevation: 1,240 ft (380 m)
- Time zone: UTC-6 (Central (CST))
  - Summer (DST): UTC-5 (CDT)
- ZIP code: 56273
- Area code: 320
- GNIS feature ID: 644735

Hawick is an unincorporated community in Roseville Township, Kandiyohi County, Minnesota, United States.

The community is located between New London and Paynesville along State Highway 23 (MN 23) at the junction with Kandiyohi County Road 2. Hawick is located 41 miles west-southwest of the city of Saint Cloud.

== History ==
Hawick was originally settled by immigrants from Norway during the mid-19th century through the early 20th century.

Hawick was first named Havig, according to author Martin Ulvestad, who wrote extensively about early Norwegian–American settlements in Minnesota circa 1907.

Conversely, according to Minnesota historian Warren Upham in the book Minnesota Place Names: a Geographical Encyclopedia" the name Hawick is believed to have come from local railroad superintendent R. Manvel, who named the community after Hawick, Scotland.

Hawick zip code was 56246 before the post office closed and mail was transferred to the New London post office changing the zip code to 56273.

Hawick prefix telephone numbers would start with 276

There were many different businesses that have or are currently operating.

Gil's Grocery Store-Started in 1938 by Gil and Betty Quarfot was taken over by Harold and Katie Paulson and closed in 1999. 3

Monson Lumber Yard-Started in 1966. Office building burned in 2006 by arson, it was rebuilt and still in operation today. 4

GEM Candles (run by Edna Sunde and Majorie Larson)

Hawick Blacksmith and Welding 4

Hawick Methodist Church

Hawick State Bank, which housed a bar and restaurant after the bank closed. Katie Paulson ran the restaurant. 3

Car Dealership

Post Office-which was located in Gil's Store 3

Rittenhouse Bee Farm

Hardware Store-Gus Peterson. Purchased in 1938 by Gil and Betty Quarfot. Phased out in the early 1940's and turned into Gil's Grocery Store. 3
