= Roseville High School =

Roseville High School can refer to:

== United States ==
- Roseville High School (California)
- Roseville High School (Michigan)
- Roseville Area High School (Minnesota)
- Roseville High School (Ohio)
