= George King (religious leader) =

British author, founder of the Aetherius Society (1919–1997)

- Born: 23 January 1919; Wellington, Shropshire, England, United Kingdom of Great Britain and Ireland
- Died: 12 July 1997 (aged 78); Santa Barbara, California, United States
- Occupations: Writer and founder of the Aetherius Society
- Years active: 1954–1997
- Known for: Aetherius Society
- Notable work: Contact Your Higher Self Through Yoga (1955); The Twelve Blessings (1962); The Nine Freedoms (1963)

George King (23 January 1919, Wellington, Shropshire – 12 July 1997, Santa Barbara, California) was a British author, esotericist, and spiritual figure who founded the Aetherius Society, a new religious movement, during the mid-1950s.

== Biography ==
George King was born on 23 January 1919, in Wellington, Shropshire, England and brought up in a Protestant family with strong occult interests. His father (also called George King) was a school teacher and his mother, Mary, was a nurse and small business owner. The family relocated on several occasions as his father sought better appointments, settling for a period in North Yorkshire. King was educated at Guisborough Grammar School. In 1937, King, at the age of 18, left the family home and moved to London. Led by his belief in pacifism, he became a conscientious objector during the Second World War, serving in the Auxiliary Fire Service. Later, he worked as a chauffeur and security officer.

As a youth and young man King studied theosophy, spiritualism, anthroposophy, Rosicrucianism, and yoga. In 1954, he claimed that a voice told him: "Prepare yourself! You are to become the voice of Interplanetary Parliament". Afterwards, in 1955, he founded the Aetherius Society and published the book Contact Your Higher Self Through Yoga. In 1959, he was interviewed on BBC television about his beliefs and experiences.

George King died in Santa Barbara, California, on 12 July 1997, at the age of 78, according to the Aetherius Society. However, his death was not reported in major newspapers.

== Titles ==
The Aetherius Society usually refers to King as "Dr. George King". The society does not, however, document where King received his doctorate. David Barrett states that King received his doctorate from the "International Theological Seminary of California, a degree mill with no accreditation". King is also referred to as Metropolitan Archbishop of the Aetherius Churches. His consecration as a bishop was from the Theosophy-related Liberal Catholic Church.

King is also "referred to [by the society] as an author, inventor, metaphysician, occultist, prophet, psychic, spiritual healer, spiritual leader, teacher, yogi and Aquarian master". He was also lavished with innumerable titles, degrees, and honors from unorthodox sources. According to the society, the various honors were all given to King as a "token offer of gratitude" for his work. Mikael Rothstein observes that all of this hagiographical material is primarily aimed at believers who have special, 'esoteric' knowledge about King, whereas the society's communications during publicity campaigns are angled differently.

Barrett notes that amongst King's titles are listed a Knighthood in the Sovereign Military Orthodox Dynastic Imperial Constantinian Order of Saint George, which was from a branch of the Byzantine Royal House in exile, and was not recognized by the College of Arms in England, as the title "Sir" might imply. King received other chivalric titles and various degrees. Barrett states that neither the chivalric titles nor the degrees were recognized by any mainstream bodies.

According to one source, King used as a formal title "His Eminence Sir George King, O.S.P., (Note: Order of Saint Peter) Ph.D., Th.D., D.D., Metropolitan Archbishop of the Aetherius Churches." The knighthood is not British but from "an unspecified foreign source". American radio personality Long John Nebel had King as a guest on his show and later wrote: " 'George King of England' – is what he calls himself, and you can't be sure whether he's pausing after 'George,' or after 'King,' but it doesn't really matter because after about three minutes you get the idea strong and clear."

In 1991 King was "presented Letters Patent of Armorial Bearings also known as a Grant of Arms, by Bluemantle Pursuivant, a Herald of Her Majesty's College of Arms in England." A Grant of Arms is applied for; anyone can receive a Grant of Arms, if they can satisfy one of several requirements, but King could not and his grant was annulled the following year.

According to skeptic James Randi, George King's titles of 'Reverend', 'Doctor' and 'Sir' are unverified.

== Reception and criticism ==
King has been described as a mystagogue and a religious virtuoso in the manner he formed and led the development of the Aetherius Society as a "magico-religious" organisation. His claims have been denounced as pseudoscience by some skeptics.

== Publications ==
Selected writings:

- 1955. Contact Your Higher Self Through Yoga. Los Angeles: Aetherius Society.
- 1958. Life on the Planets. Hollywood, CA: Aetherius Society.
- 1961. You Are Responsible!. Hollywood, CA: Aetherius Society.
- 1962. The Twelve Blessings. Hollywood, CA: Aetherius Society.
- 1963. The Nine Freedoms. Hollywood, CA: Aetherius Society.
- 1964a. The Flying Saucers: A Report on the Flying Saucers, Their Crews and Their Mission to Earth. Hollywood, CA: Aetherius Society.
- 1964b. Contact Your Higher Self Through Yoga. Hollywood, CA: Aetherius Society.
- 1966. A Book of Sacred Prayers. Hollywood, CA: Aetherius Society.
- c. 1975. The Five Temples of God. Hollywood, CA: Aetherius Society.
- 1979. Operation Sunbeam: God's Magic in Action. Hollywood, CA: Aetherius Society. [First published in 1958.]
- 1982. Operation Space Magic: The Cosmic Connection. Hollywood, CA: Aetherius Society.
- 1987. Operation Space Power: The Solution of the Spiritual Energy Crisis. Hollywood, CA: Aetherius Society.
- 1988. Life on the Planets. Hollywood, CA: Aetherius Society. [First published in 1958.]
- 1989. Contact with a Lord of Karma. Hollywood, CA: Aetherius Society.
- n.d. The Practices of Aetherius. Hollywood, CA: Aetherius Society.
- 1996. With Richard Lawrence. Contacts with the Gods From Space: Pathway to the New Millennium. Hollywood, CA: Aetherius Society.
