= Roseville Township, Kandiyohi County, Minnesota =

Roseville Township, Minnesota
- Township
- Location within Minnesota and the United States Roseville Township (the United States)
- Coordinates: 45°22′N 94°50′W
- Country: United States
- State: Minnesota
- County: Kandiyohi

Area
  - Total: 35.4 sq mi (91.7 km^{2})
  - Land: 35.0 sq mi (90.6 km^{2})
  - Water: 0.42 sq mi (1.1 km^{2})
- Elevation: 1,224 ft (373 m)

Population (2000)
  - Total: 570
  - Density: 16/sq mi (6.3/km^{2})
- Time zone: UTC-6 (Central (CST))
  - Summer (DST): UTC-5 (CDT)
- FIPS code: 27-55834
- GNIS feature ID: 0665469

Roseville Township is a township in Kandiyohi County, Minnesota, United States. The population was 570 at the 2000 census.

The unincorporated community of Hawick is located within Roseville Township. The city of Regal is located within the township geographically but is a separate entity.

== History ==
Roseville Township was organized in 1866, and named for the abundance of wild roses within its borders.

== Geography ==
According to the United States Census Bureau, the township has a total area of 35.4 square miles (91.7 km^{2}), of which 35.0 square miles (90.6 km^{2}) is land and 0.4 square mile (1.1 km^{2}) (1.24%) is water.

Roseville Township is located in Township 122 North of the Arkansas Base Line and Range 33 West of the 5th Principal Meridian.

== Demographics ==
As of the census of 2000, there were 570 people, 208 households, and 159 families residing in the township. The population density was 16.3 people per square mile (6.3/km^{2}). There were 259 housing units at an average density of 7.4/sq mi (2.9/km^{2}). The racial makeup of the township was 99.12% White, 0.35% Native American, 0.53% from other races. Hispanic or Latino of any race were 0.88% of the population.

There were 208 households, out of which 39.4% had children under the age of 18 living with them, 66.8% were married couples living together, 5.3% had a female householder with no husband present, and 23.1% were non-families. 22.6% of all households were made up of individuals, and 8.7% had someone living alone who was 65 years of age or older. The average household size was 2.74 and the average family size was 3.23.

In the township the population was spread out, with 32.3% under the age of 18, 7.2% from 18 to 24, 28.6% from 25 to 44, 22.3% from 45 to 64, and 9.6% who were 65 years of age or older. The median age was 35 years. For every 100 females, there were 104.3 males. For every 100 females age 18 and over, there were 104.2 males.

The median income for a household in the township was $35,962, and the median income for a family was $39,306. Males had a median income of $28,875 versus $21,023 for females. The per capita income for the township was $14,404. About 12.1% of families and 11.8% of the population were below the poverty line, including 11.9% of those under age 18 and 17.9% of those age 65 or over.
