= Wakefield Township, Stearns County, Minnesota =

Wakefield Township, Minnesota
- Township
- Location within the state of Minnesota Wakefield Township, Minnesota (the United States)
- Coordinates: 45°27′N 94°28′W
- Country: United States
- State: Minnesota
- County: Stearns

Area
  - Total: 32.4 sq mi (84.0 km^{2})
  - Land: 30.0 sq mi (77.6 km^{2})
  - Water: 2.5 sq mi (6.4 km^{2})
- Elevation: 1,165 ft (355 m)

Population (2010)
  - Total: 2,756
  - Density: 92.0/sq mi (35.5/km^{2})
- Time zone: UTC-6 (Central (CST))
  - Summer (DST): UTC-5 (CDT)
- FIPS code: 27-67630
- GNIS feature ID: 0665895
- Website: https://www.wakefieldtownship.net/

Wakefield Township is a township in Stearns County, Minnesota, United States. The township includes the cities of Cold Spring and Richmond. The population was 2,756 at the 2010 census.

== History ==
Wakefield Township was originally called Springfield Township, and under the latter name was organized in 1858. The present name, adopted in 1870, is in honor of Samuel Wakefield, a county official.

== Geography ==
According to the United States Census Bureau, the township has a total area of 32.4 square miles (84.0 km^{2}); 30.0 square miles (77.6 km^{2}) is land and 2.5 square miles (6.4 km^{2}), or 7.62%, is water.

Wakefield Township is located in Township 123 North of the Arkansas Base Line and Range 30 West of the 5th Principal Meridian.

== Demographics ==
As of the census of 2000, there were 3,103 people, 1,046 households, and 875 families residing in the township. The population density was 100.4 inhabitants per square mile (38.8/km^{2}). There were 1,151 housing units at an average density of 37.2 per square mile (14.4/km^{2}). The racial makeup of the township was 96.97% White, 0.48% African American, 0.10% Native American, 0.06% Asian, 0.03% Pacific Islander, 1.22% from other races, and 1.13% from two or more races. Hispanic or Latino of any race were 3.42% of the population.

There were 1,046 households, out of which 43.7% had children under the age of 18 living with them, 74.9% were married couples living together, 4.7% had a female householder with no husband present, and 16.3% were non-families. 13.1% of all households were made up of individuals, and 3.8% had someone living alone who was 65 years of age or older. The average household size was 2.97 and the average family size was 3.24.

In the township the population was spread out, with 32.1% under the age of 18, 6.0% from 18 to 24, 29.9% from 25 to 44, 23.3% from 45 to 64, and 8.7% who were 65 years of age or older. The median age was 35 years. For every 100 females, there were 108.5 males. For every 100 females age 18 and over, there were 106.1 males.

The median income for a household in the township was $56,204, and the median income for a family was $58,493. Males had a median income of $38,945 versus $24,583 for females. The per capita income for the township was $21,335. About 2.9% of families and 4.2% of the population were below the poverty line, including 7.1% of those under age 18 and 1.1% of those age 65 or over.
