= Wakefield station (MBTA) =

Train station in Wakefield, Massachusetts, US

Wakefield
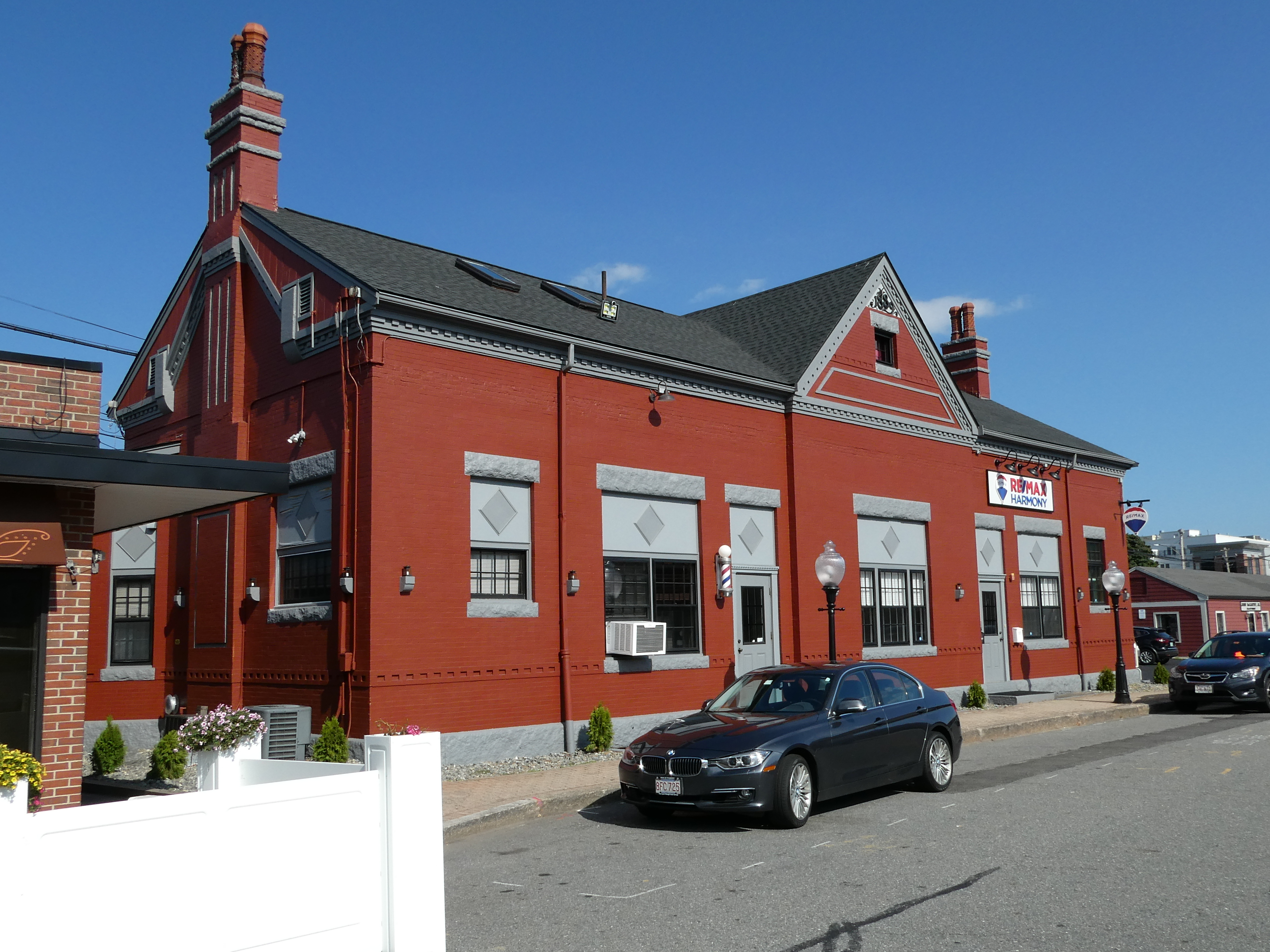
- The Wakefield station building in 2022

General information
- Location: 225 North Avenue; Wakefield, Massachusetts
- Coordinates: 42°30′8.0″N 71°4′32.3″W
- Owner: Town of Wakefield
- Line: Western Route
- Platforms: 2 side platforms
- Tracks: 2
- Connections: MBTA bus: 137

Construction
- Parking: 117 spaces
- Cycle facilities: 6 spaces
- Accessible: No

Other information
- Fare zone: 2

History
- Opened: 1845
- Rebuilt: 1889

Passengers
- 2024: 183 daily boardings

Services
Preceding station	MBTA	Following station
Greenwood toward North Station	Haverhill Line	Reading toward Haverhill
- Wakefield Upper Depot
- U.S. National Register of Historic Places
- Location: 27–29 Tuttle Street, Wakefield, Massachusetts, USA
- Built: 1889
- Architectural style: Panel Brick
- MPS: Wakefield MRA
- NRHP reference No.: 89000719
- Added to NRHP: July 06, 1989
Location

Wakefield station is an MBTA Commuter Rail station in Wakefield, Massachusetts served by the Haverhill Line. The station has two side platforms, which are not accessible, serving the line's two tracks. The station building, constructed in 1889, was listed on the National Register of Historic Places in 1989 as Wakefield Upper Depot.

== History ==
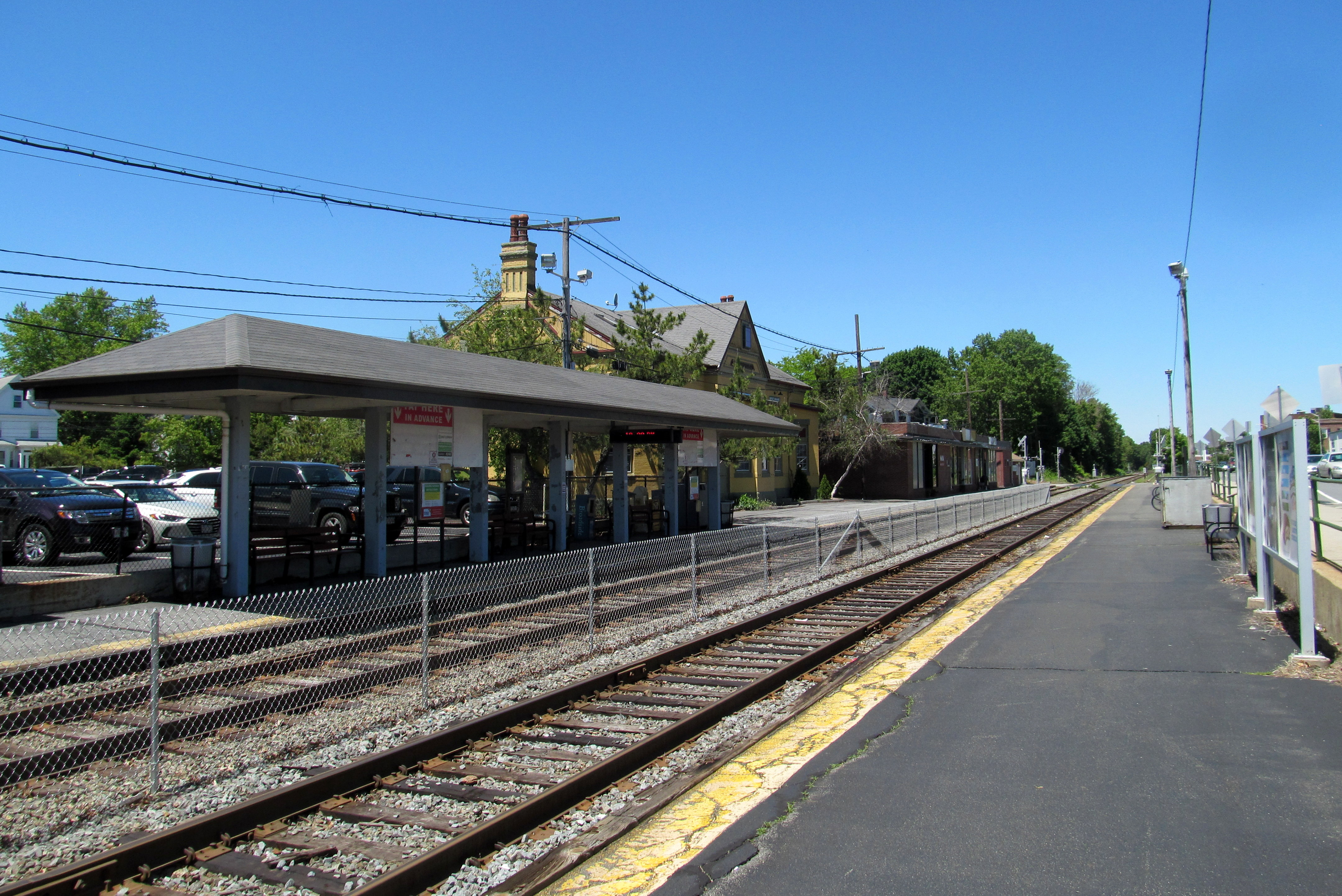
The station platforms in 2017

The Boston and Maine Railroad built its mainline through South Reading in 1845, primarily through the efforts of Thomas Spaulding, a local businessman. The first station was a wooden structure on the east side of the tracks. A new station building was constructed in 1889; the original depot was relocated and converted to a freight house. By 1893, the town had six stations with as many as 60 trains per day. The building is architecturally distinctive in the town as an example of Panel Brick architecture.

The station building was converted to commercial use by 1968. A fire in one of the businesses inside gutted the structure late on December 17, 1974. The 16-inch (410 mm)-thick brick walls survived the fire; it was rebuilt by 1977, with a pharmaceutical company the first occupant. The building was listed on the National Register of Historic Places in 1989 as Wakefield Upper Depot.

Rail service on the inner Haverhill Line was suspended from September 9 to November 5, 2023, to accommodate signal work. Substitute bus service was operated between Reading and Oak Grove, serving all intermediate stops.

The original station building, still extant, is located on North Avenue about 1/3 mile (0.5 km) to the south. The former Lynnfield Centre depot from the Newburyport Railroad line, closed in 1959, is located at the north end of the 1889-built station. Wakefield Centre station (Center Depot), another NRHP-listed station, is about 0.5 miles (0.80 km) to the east.

In 2024, the MBTA tested a temporary freestanding accessible platform design at Beverly Depot. These platforms do not require alterations to the existing platforms, thus skirting federal rules requiring full accessibility renovations when stations are modified, and were intended to provide interim accessibility at lower cost pending full reconstruction. Wakefield was planned to be part of the second set of non-accessible stations to be modified with the temporary platforms. Funding for design and construction came from Fair Share Amendment revenues. Design work began in the first half of 2024. However, Wakefield was dropped from the plans by mid-2025.
