= Gama, Federal District =

Gama
- Administrative region
- Região Administrativa de Gama; Administrative Region of Gama
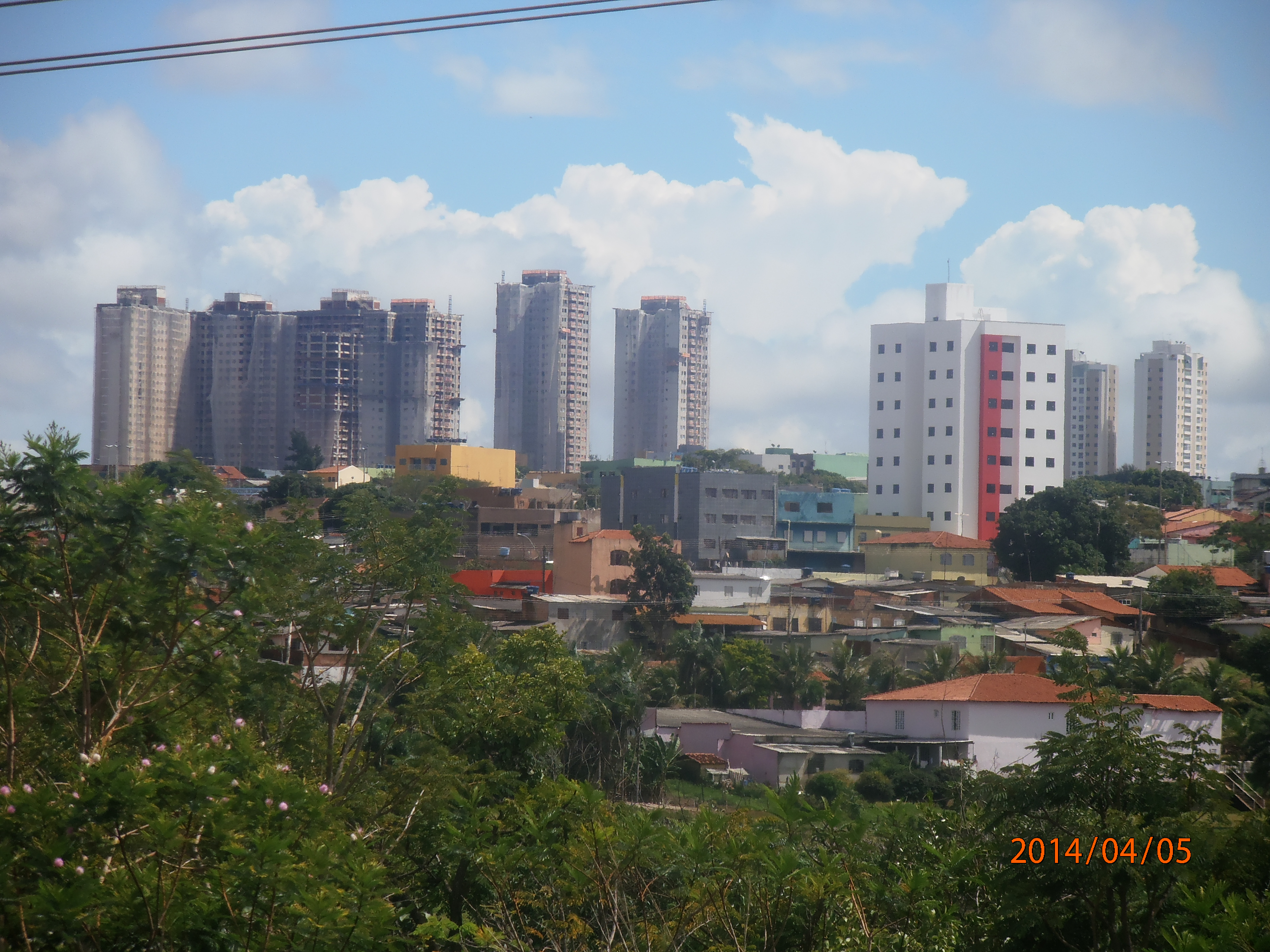
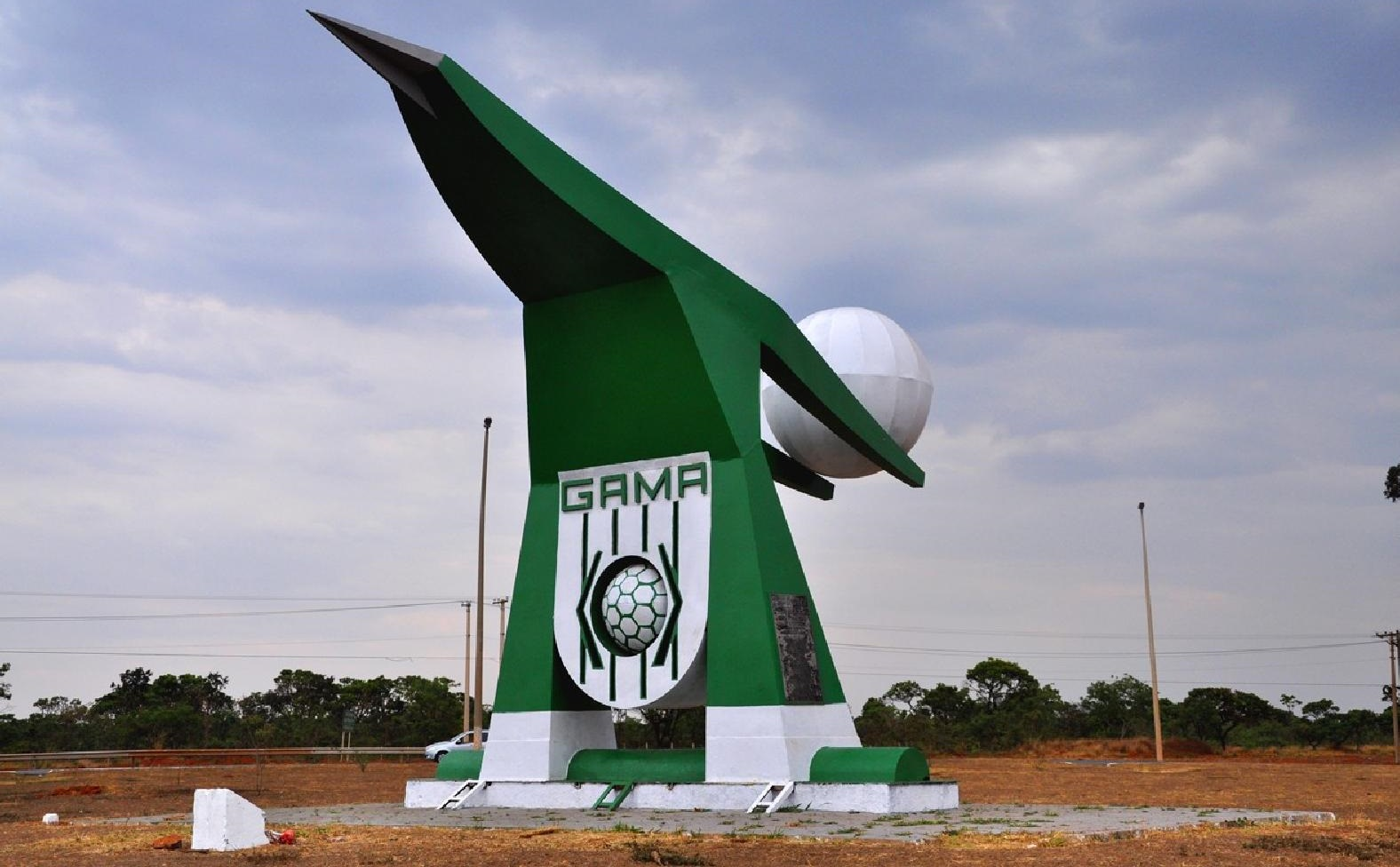
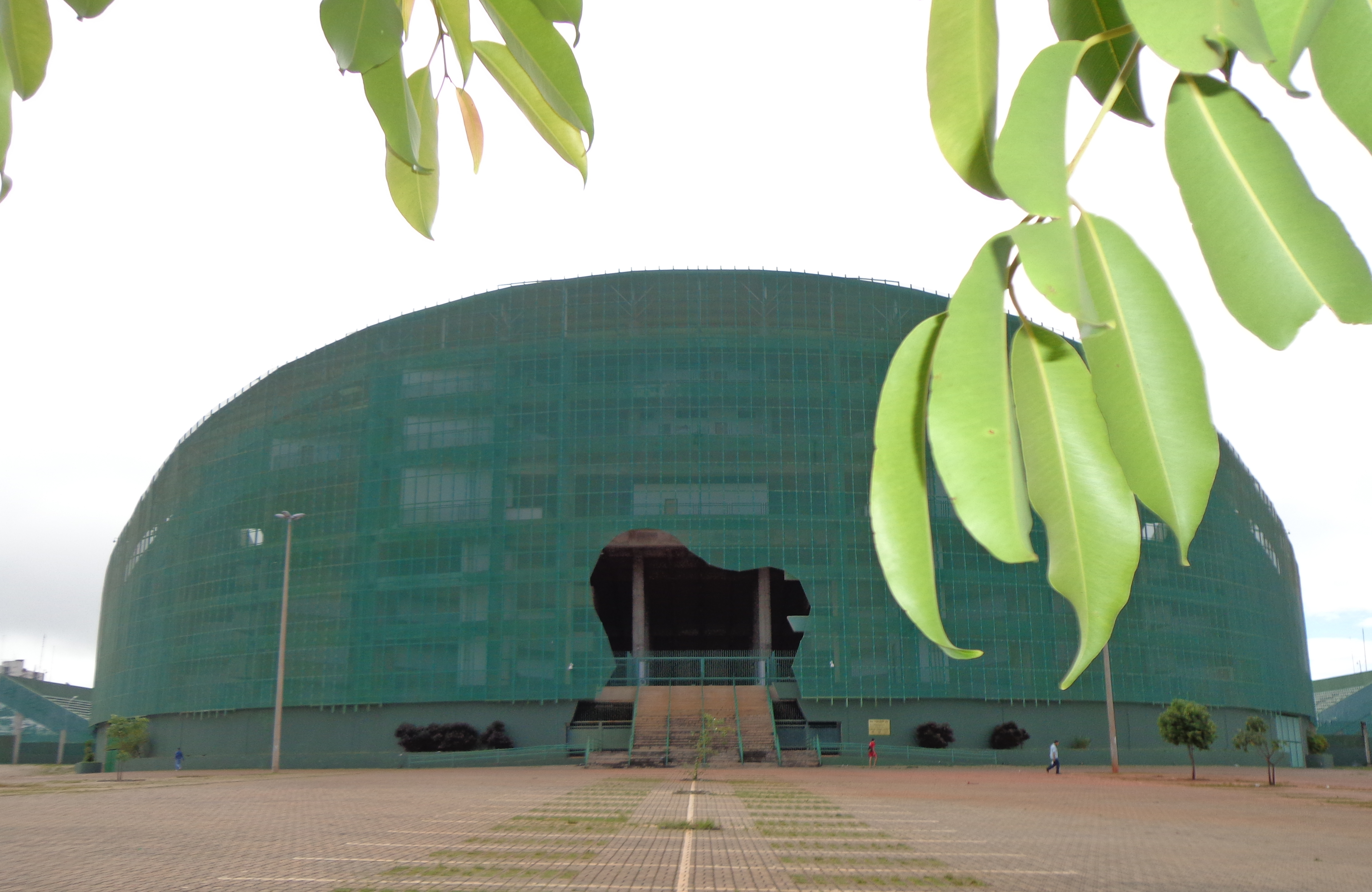
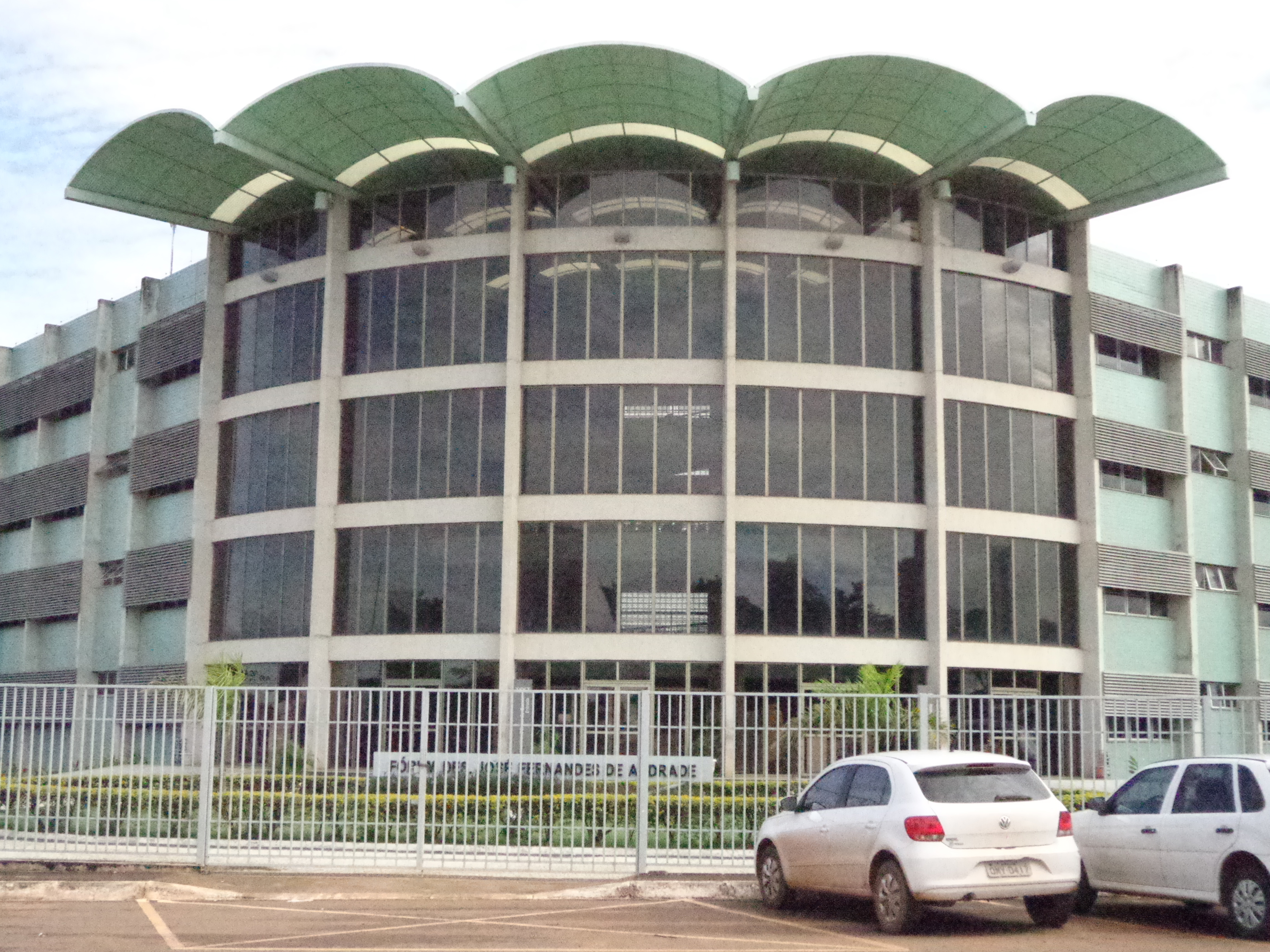
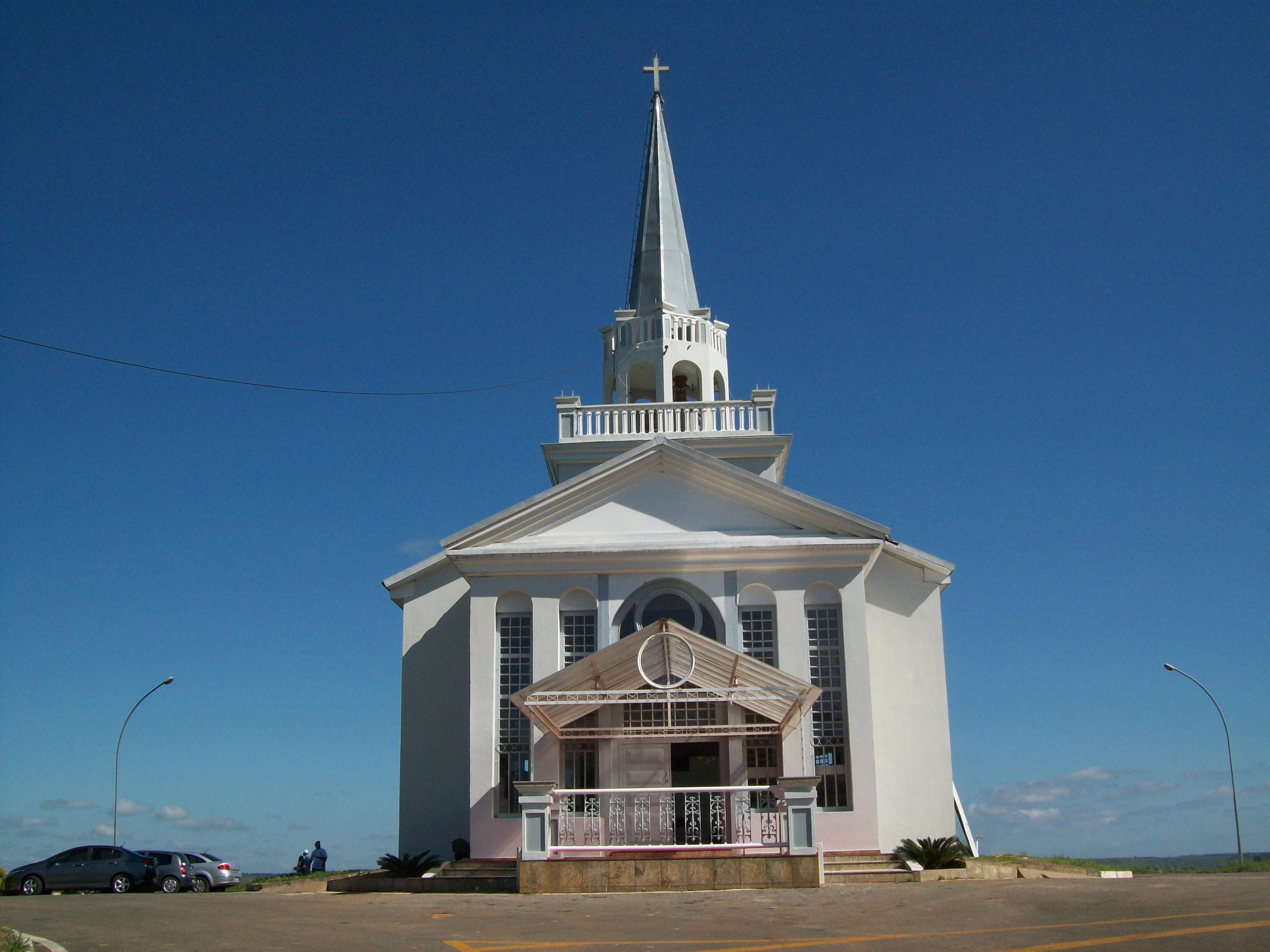
- Clockwise from top: Skyline; Bezerrão; Capela São Francisco; Forum; and Balão do Periquito

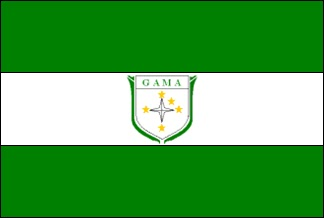
- Flag

- Localization of Gama in Federal District

- Localization of Gama in Brazil
- Coordinates: 16°01′10″S 48°04′01″W
- Country: Brazil
- Region: Central-West
- State: Federal District
- Founded: October 12, 1960

Government
  - Regional administrator: Maria Antônia Rodrigues Magalhães

Area
  - Total: 27.634 km^{2} (10.670 sq mi)
- Elevation: 1,000 m (3,300 ft)

Population (2010)
  - Total: 127,121
  - Density: 4,600/km^{2} (12,000/sq mi)
- Demonym: Gamense
- Time zone: UTC−3 (BRT)
- Postal Code (CEP): 72400-000
- Area code: +55 61
- Website: www.gama.df.gov.br

Gama (Portuguese pronunciation: [ˈɡɐ.ma]) is an administrative region in the Federal District in Brazil. It is bordered by Recanto das Emas to the north, Riacho Fundo II and Park Way to the northeast, and Santa Maria to the east.

== History ==
=== Founding ===
In late 1746, Bandeirante Antônio Bueno de Avezedo left Paracatu, Minas Gerais, leading a group of friends and numerous slaves. The group traveled northwestward, reaching the banks of a river that Bueno named São Bartolomeu, in honor of the saint of the day. Three months later, he continued west and reached the banks of the Vermelho River. There he built farms and some ranches. In December of that year, Bueno continued westward, settling in the place he named Santa Luzia. Santa Luzia village eventually grew into today's Luziânia, Goiás and was officially renamed such in 1943.

The settlement's founding was linked to gold mining. Mining was so intense that the newly founded settlement soon had a population of 10,000, including slaves. The first Mass in Santa Luzia was officiated by Father da Gama Mendonça on March 25, 1747, with over 6,000 people in attendance. Due to the settlement's rapid growth, it was designated a Judiciary in 1749 and became a collective parish by decree in 1756. Two years later, in 1758, Santa Luzia was elevated to an Ecclesiastical District, with Father Domingos Ramos appointed as its Vicar.

That same year, in April 1758, a major engineering project began to better exploit the "Cruzeiro" mines. 2,000 slaves worked uninterrupted for two years to construct the Rêgo Saia Velha, a 42-kilometer canal. However, its inauguration in 1770 sparked both celebration and confusion in the village, leading the local judge to order the arrest of several prominent figures, including the project's foreman.

=== Name Origin ===
While the definitive origin of the name "Gama" is unconfirmed, its geographical source is certain: it traces back to the Gama Plateau, the location of the Gama stream's headwaters. The most plausible theory suggests that these landmarks were named in honor of Father Luiz da Gama Mendonça.

=== Modern History ===
When the capital of Brazil was transferred upcountry, the farmlands were dispossessed (i.e., the government of Goiás legally took ownership of the land from private farmers). Between 1956 and 1958, under the responsibility of a Commission organized to transfer the capital of Brazil, presided over by Altamiro de Moura Pacheco.

The headquarters of a farm called "Gama" was close to the Catetinho (first official residence of President Juscelino Kubitschek); nevertheless the city was settled 8 kilometers (5.0 mi) away from this reference point. President Juscelino Kubitschek visited Gama on October 2, 1956, on his first visit to the region where the new capital would be built. The city was initially created to shelter people resident in invasions or provisional shelters, or those that would work on Brasília’s construction.

Architect Paulo Hungria had, by May 1960, developed the blueprint of the city, which would have the form of a beehive, dividing it into five sectors: North, South, East, West and Centre. The Centre Sector (for trade activities) was not so detailed due to future needs. Notwithstanding this, engineer José Maciel de Paiva, by order of mayor Israel Pinheiro (former president of Novacap), was charged with setting up a pioneer center and promoting the first transferences from September 1960 onward. He was assisted by an engineer, José Carlos Godoy, by an inspector, Agnelo Dias Correia, and by a master-builder, Joaquim Santana and others.

The initial settlement was carried out by removing 30 families near Paranoá dam. Gama was founded on October 12, 1960, receiving the status of administrative region, according to Law 4545, of December 10, 1964. Later the city received many of the former residents of Vila Amaury and Vila Planalto. In 1970, the inhabitants settled in the Industry Sector of Taguatinga.

== Geography ==
The Administrative Region of Gama is bounded to the south by the parallel 16°03′ S, where it borders the municipalities of Santo Antônio do Descoberto and Luziânia in the state of Goiás. Its western boundary is formed by the Descoberto River, while to the east it borders the Administrative Region of Santa Maria. To the north, it adjoins the regions of Recanto das Emas, Riacho Fundo, and Núcleo Bandeirante.

The terrain of the region is predominantly gently flat to gently undulating, with a notable feature being the Vale do Tamanduá. Altitudes in the region are distributed as follows: flat surfaces above 1,200 m, with a maximum elevation of approximately 1,271 m, predominantly covered by cerrado and cerradão; surfaces between 1,000 m and 1,200 m, with vegetation including sparse cerrado (cerrado ralo), cerrado, cerradão, and patches of gallery forest (mata ciliar); and surfaces below 1,000 m down to 900 m, covered by sparse cerrado, semi-deciduous forest (mata subcaducifólia), and some gallery forest. The soils in Gama are generally acidic and of low fertility, consisting mainly of cambic, latosolic, and textural B horizon types, with smaller areas of hydromorphic soils and alluvial soils found in low-lying areas along streams and creeks.

=== Parks and Biodiversity ===
The Gama Recreational Park, also known as Prainha, is crisscrossed by the rapids and waterfalls of the Ribeirão de Gama River. Here, you can also see and hear rare species of fauna from the region's Cerrado, such as otters, foxes, maned wolves, and some species of deer. The park was established in 1961, initially referred to as Gama Municipal Park. It was the first legally protected territorial space in the Federal District, with an area of 790 hectares, located in the administrative region of Gama. In 1982, a 136-hectare portion of Gama Municipal Park was transformed into Gama Recreational Park. The remaining area was transferred to the management of the Zoobotanical Foundation of the Federal District. In 1988, the Gama Ecological Reserve was established with an area of 136 hectares, a Conservation Unit overlapping the former area of the Gama Recreational Park.

=== Climate ===
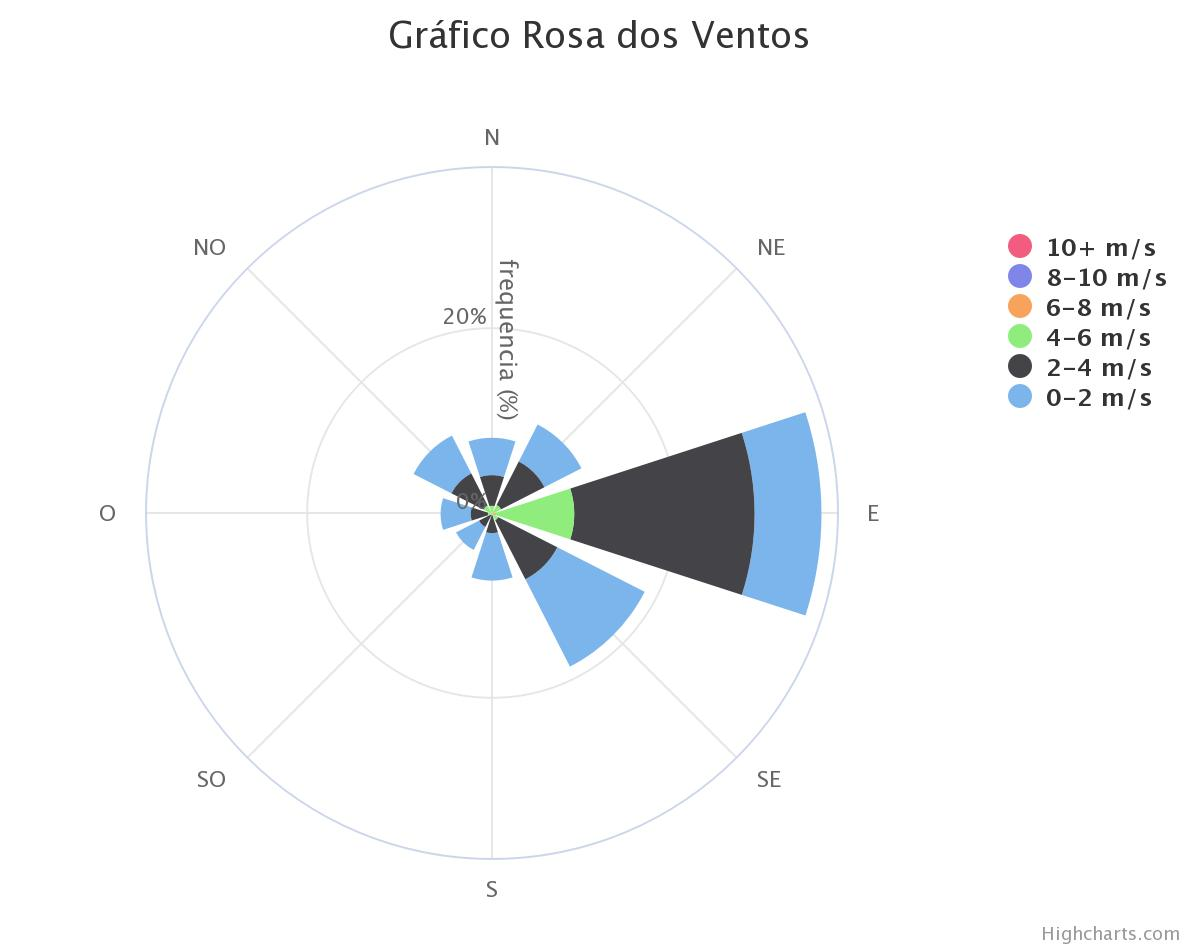
Predominant winds chart

The climate of the Federal District is tropical savanna, classified as Aw, and in some higher-altitude areas, Cwa and Cwb under the Köppen climate classification. It is characterized by two distinct seasons: a dry period, with an almost total absence of rainfall, from May to September; and a rainy season from October to April. The climate of Gama is identical to that of the entire Federal District.

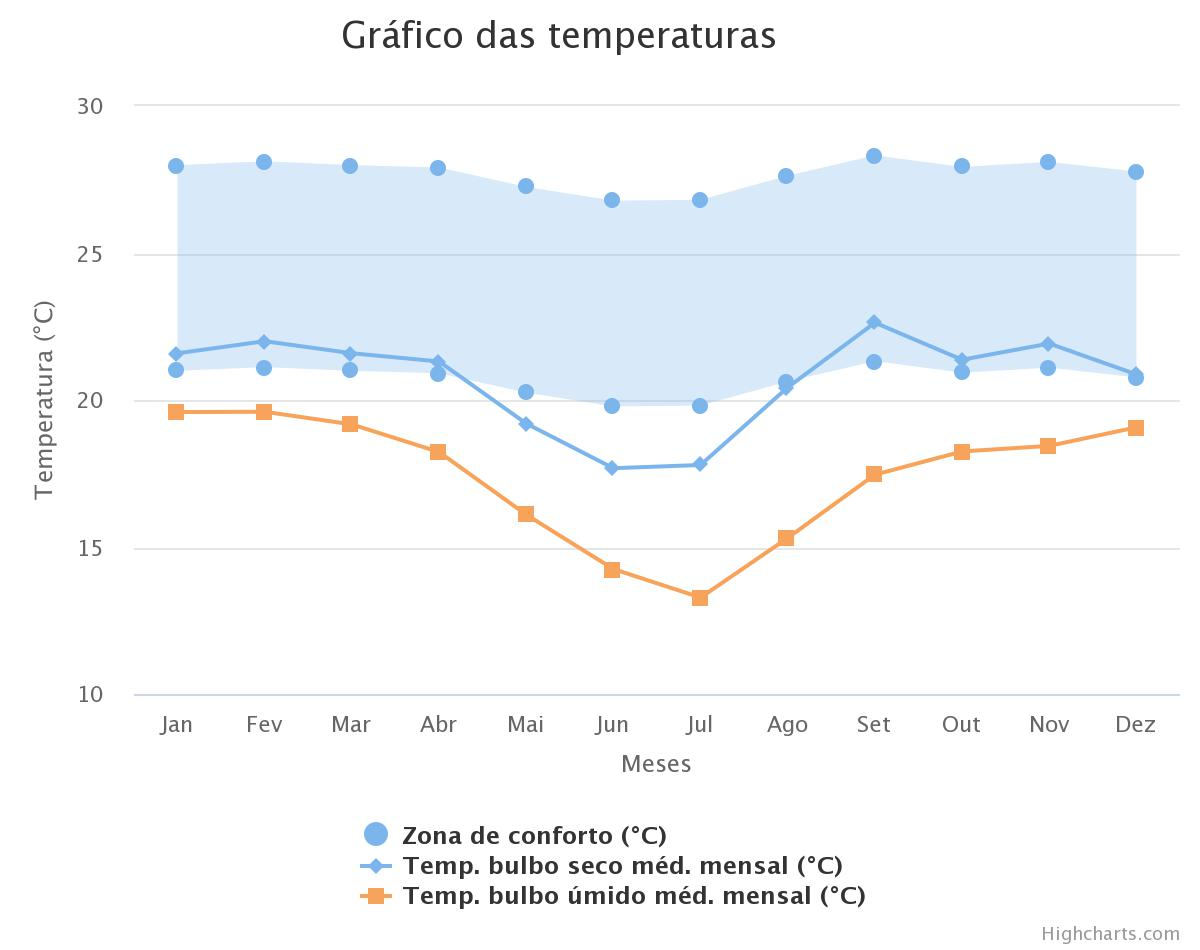
Temperature chart of the Federal District

The average annual temperature is approximately 22 °C (72 °F), with the months of September and October being the warmest and June and July the coolest. Historically, the average annual rainfall exceeded 1,500 mm (59 in), but recent decades have seen significant drops in precipitation. During the severe water crisis of 2014–2017, for instance, rainfall was so low that water rationing was implemented in several administrative regions. This decline in precipitation is linked to the widespread conversion of the Cerrado biome's native vegetation into agricultural land.

Relative humidity averages around 55% annually but drops to critical levels during the dry season, particularly in July and August. At this time, it can fall to 20% or even lower, reaching near-desert levels.

== Urban Sectors ==
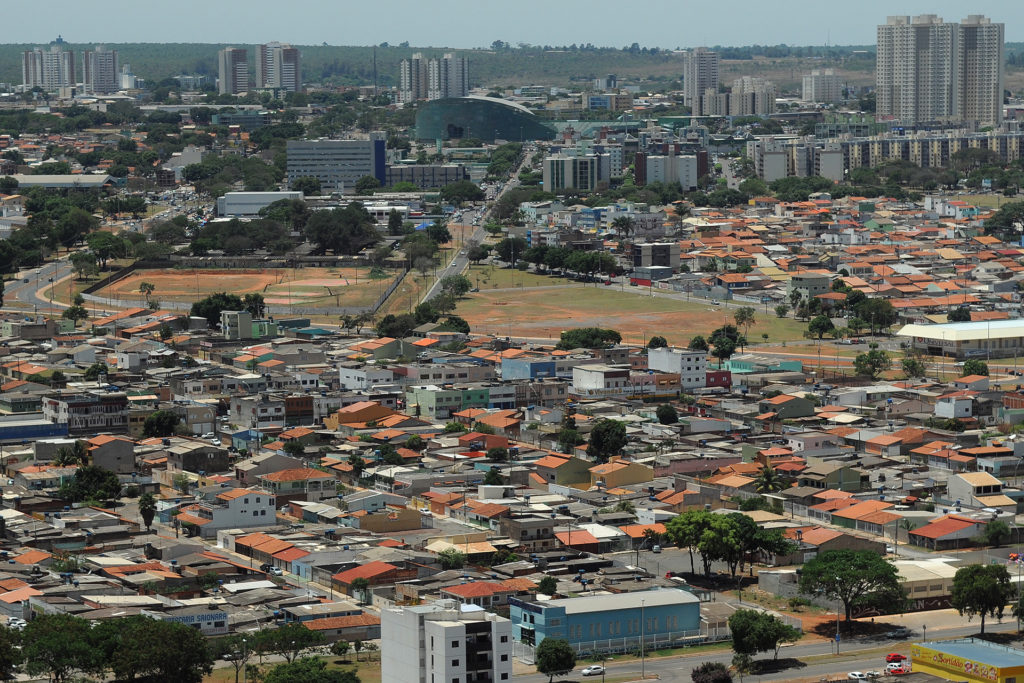
West Sector

The administrative region of Gama was designed with a central plan, originally conceived with five distinct sectors, each serving a specific function. Over time, the city's growth has led to a more complex structure, now officially comprising nine sectors.

- The West Sector contains a mix of residential and commercial areas, consistent with its initial urban plan.

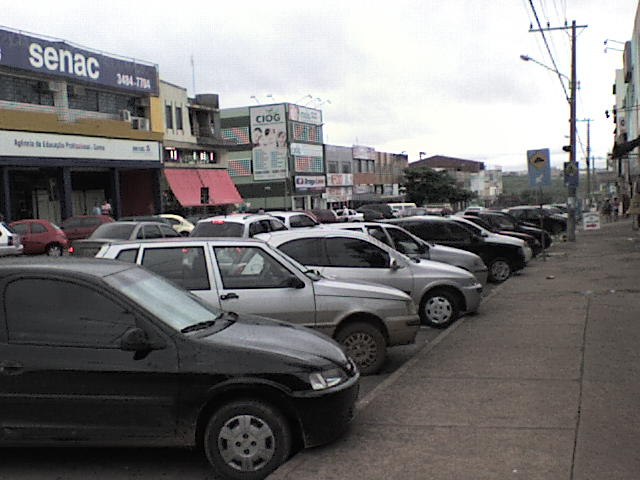
East Sector: commercial, residential, and industrial area

- The East Sector is characterized by a blend of commercial, industrial, and residential areas, reflecting its original role as a hub for both industry and housing.
- The North and South sectors were established as the city's more affluent areas with larger residential lots. Specifically, the South Sector is officially designated as the "Gama Mansions Sector" and is primarily a residential area with larger plots.
- The Central Sector serves as the commercial heart of the city, known for its high pedestrian traffic and concentration of various businesses.
- While initially considered part of the East Sector, the Industrial Sector has become a distinct area due to its significant development of civil construction, industries, factories, and workshops.

The current official administrative division of Gama includes the following nine sectors: Leste, Central, Industrial, Norte, Oeste, Sul, Ponte Alta Sul, and Ponte Alta Norte.

== Economy ==
Based on data from the 2018 Household Sample Survey (PDAD), conducted by the Federal District Planning Company (Codeplan), 58.7% of the population (64,833 people) aged 14 or older was economically active. Among this group, 68.6% of respondents reported working in the Services sector, 25% in Commerce, and 5.1% in Industry. Nearly half of the working population (about 43.2%) is employed within the administrative region of Gama itself. According to a 2021 Codeplan study, the majority of the population is classified as lower-middle class.

Beyond public service, established commerce is the main economic driver, with over 6,500 businesses. Business owners estimate that around 600,000 people from neighboring cities in Goiás (Novo Gama, Valparaíso, Cidade Ocidental, Luziânia, and Santo Antônio do Descoberto) visit Gama daily, transforming it into a key economic and geographic hub for the region. The city also has universities, banks, industries, a shopping mall (Gama Shopping Center), and national chains of gyms, pharmacies, and supermarkets.

The Industrial Sector of Gama has been transformed into a mixed-use area, allowing for the incorporation of commercial and residential developments. This change was implemented through the city's urban planning, which re-categorized the area from a solely industrial zone to a mixed-use district. The area now also includes the Setor de Múltiplas Atividades (Multi-Activity Sector), which is expected to house approximately 500 businesses dedicated to commercial goods and services.

The Continuous National Household Sample Survey (PNAD Contínua), conducted by the IBGE, indicates that the average monthly income in 2021 was R$2,644.96 ($496.50 USD) for workers aged 14 and over. This is considered a low to medium income when compared to the minimum required for a family of four, which, according to the Inter-union Department of Statistics and Socioeconomic Studies (Dieese), would be equivalent to R$6,754.33 ($1,267.89 USD), or 5.57 times the 2022 minimum wage of R$1,212.00 ($227.51 USD).

== Education ==
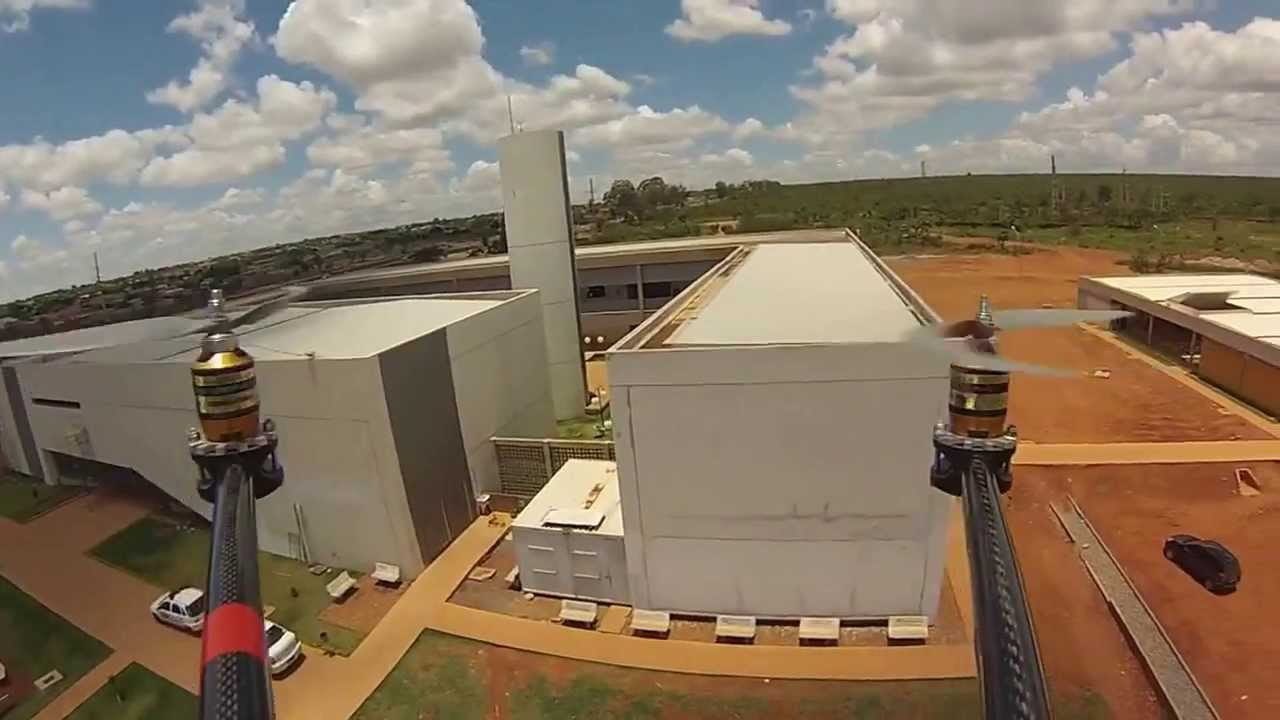
Universidade de Brasília - Campus Gama

Both primary and secondary education are offered through the federal public system and by private institutions in the administrative region of Gama. For higher education, the area features numerous private institutions, including Faculdade Apogeu, Centro Universitário do Planalto Central Apparecido dos Santos (Uniceplac), UNIP, Faculdade Mauá, UniBrasília, IESB, Universidade Norte do Paraná, and the Catholic University of Brasília (UCB).

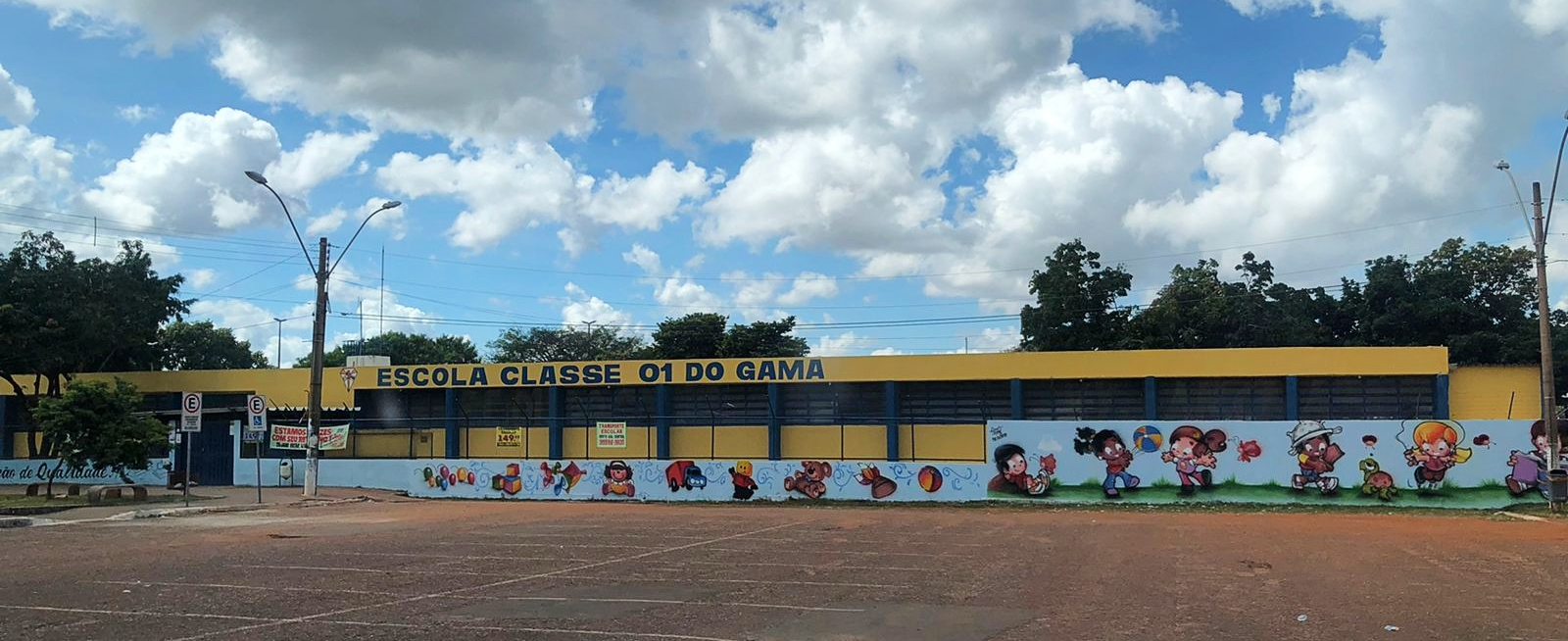
Escola Classe 01

Additionally, several universities focused on distance learning, such as Cruzeiro do Sul and UniCesumar, maintain local support centers in the region. On the public side, the University of Brasília (UnB) operates the Faculty of Gama (FGA). The FGA campus specializes in engineering, offering undergraduate degrees in Aerospace, Automotive, Electronics, Energy, and Software Engineering. Together with the Gama campus of the Federal Institute of Brasília (IFB), it forms an educational corridor along the DF-480 highway.

== Demographics ==
According to the 2021 District Household Sample Survey (PDAD), conducted by the Companhia de Planejamento do Distrito Federal (CODEPLAN), the estimated urban population of the Gama Administrative Region (RA) was 137,331 people.

=== Population Characteristics ===
- Gender: The population was composed of 52.3% female residents and 47.7% male residents.
- Race/Color: The most common self-declared race/color was Parda (Brown), representing 42.8% of the population.
- Marital Status: Of the population aged 14 years or more, 44.1% reported being single.

=== Origin and Migration ===
- Origin: 65.7% of the residents were born in the Federal District.
- Non-Native Origin: For those not born in the Federal District, the most frequently reported state of origin was Piauí, accounting for 14.6% of non-native residents.
- Reason for Moving: The main motivation for heads of household moving to or returning to the Federal District was to accompany relatives or for family reunion (51.4%).

=== Health and Disability ===
- Vision: 84.6% reported no difficulty with vision.
- Hearing: 94.7% reported no difficulty with hearing.
- Mobility: 91.8% reported no difficulty walking or climbing stairs.
- Intellectual/Mental: 96.6% reported no intellectual or mental disability.

=== Education and Commute ===
- Literacy: 97.7% of people aged six years or more reported knowing how to read and write.
- School Attendance (Ages 4–24): 54.1% reported attending a public school.
- Local Schooling: 86.3% of students who attended school studied within the Gama Administrative Region itself.
- Commute to School: The primary mode of transportation to school was walking (48.1%), with 69.3% of students taking 15 minutes or less for the journey.
- Educational Attainment (Ages 25+): 35.7% of the population aged 25 or more had completed secondary (high school) education.

=== Labor Market and Income ===
- Labor Force Participation Rate: 62.8%.
- Employment Rate: 53.0% of the population (approximately 61,137 people) was employed.
- Unemployment Rate: 9.8% of the population (approximately 11,353 people) was unemployed.
- "Neither-Nor" Youth (18-29): 30.9% of young adults in this age bracket (approximately 9,387 people) were in the "neither studying nor working" condition.

=== Economic Indicators ===
- Average Monthly Household Income (2021): R$ 4,706.42 (~USD 883.33).
- Average Monthly Per Capita Income (2021): R$ 1,956.23 (~USD 367.01).
- Gini Index (Inequality):
  - Household Income: 0.49
  - Per Capita Income: 0.53

== Politics and Administration ==
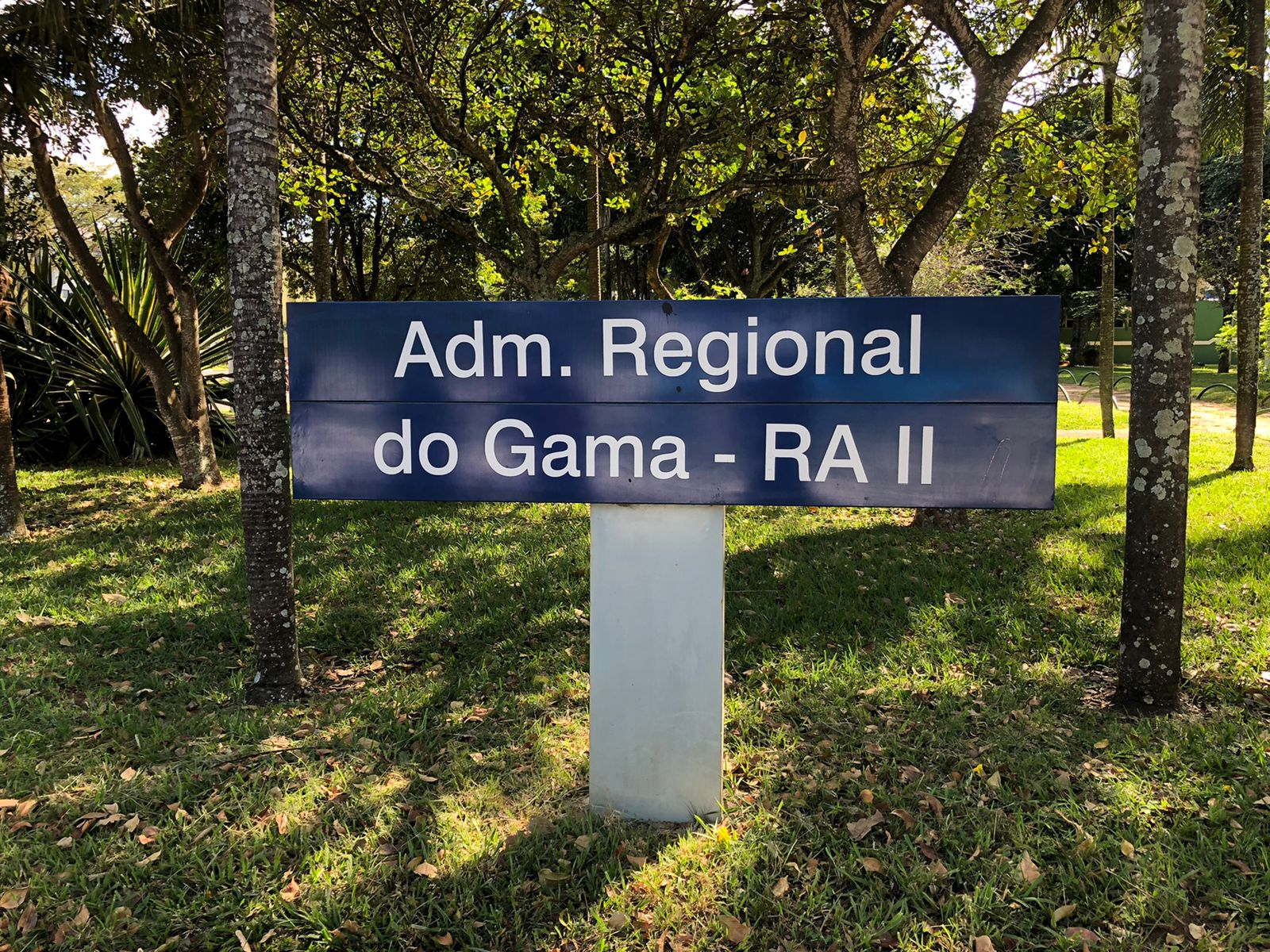
Sign for the Gama Regional Administration building

The Regional Administration of Gama is a direct administration body of the Federal District Government, subordinate to the Secretariat of Government (SEGOV), in coordination with the Executive Secretariat of Cities (formerly linked to the former Secretariat of State for Cities, as per Decree No. 37,625/2016).

Its competencies include representing the Federal District Government in the region, supervising, inspecting, and executing public programs, projects, and actions of public interest within its jurisdiction, in addition to coordinating essential public services.

Urban maintenance services, such as pothole patching, tree pruning, and the collection of trash and debris, can be requested directly through the Regional Administration of Gama's Ombudsman (Ouvidoria). In addition to service requests, citizens can also register compliments, suggestions, complaints, requests for information, and reports of irregularities.

== Sports ==
Football has been a significant source of national recognition for Gama, supplementing its economic importance. In the late 1990s, Sociedade Esportiva do Gama gained prominence among the country's major teams by winning several competitions and defeating top clubs from the Rio-São Paulo axis, culminating in the 1998 Campeonato Brasileiro Série B title. The club's continued regional dominance was cemented when Gama won the 2025 Campeonato Brasiliense, securing their 14th state championship and qualification for national competitions in the following season.

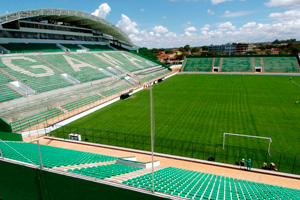
The Estádio Bezerrão in Gama.

The Walmir Campelo Bezerra Stadium, commonly known as Bezerrão, is located in the central sector of the city. It serves as the home field for Sociedade Esportiva do Gama, which has the largest fanbase among teams in the Federal District. The stadium was remodeled in 2008 as a multi-purpose arena with installations designed to host large events and shows.

The stadium has hosted high-profile international matches, including a 2008 friendly game between the Brazilian and Portuguese national football teams. Furthermore, the stadium was one of the host venues for the 2019 FIFA U-17 World Cup, where it held both the opening match and the final of the competition.

The famous footballer Kaká, who was voted the best player in the world in 2007, was born in Gama.

== Notable people ==
- Kaká, footballer
- Igor Thiago, footballer

== Sport ==
Gama is home to the Bezerrão stadium, and the local professional association football team is SE Gama.

== See also ==
- List of administrative regions of the Federal District
