= Planaltina sex case =

2022 incident

The Planaltina sex case refers to the case where the (unnamed) wife of personal trainer Eduardo Alves had sex with a homeless man, subsequently leading Eduardo to beat him. The fact occurred on March 9, 2022, in Planaltina, in the Federal District of Brazil, and had national repercussions.

== Case ==
On the night of March 9, 2022 at Jardim Roriz, in Planaltina, Distrito Federal, according to the police report, the wife went out with her mother-in-law to try to help the homeless man. However, along the way, they broke up. The personal trainer Eduardo Alves, her husband, then went out to look for her. On the way, he found the woman's car parked, and as he approached, he saw that she was having sex with the homeless man. The husband then began to attack him, already outside the vehicle — the moment was recorded by security cameras, showing Eduardo punching and kicking. The Military Police of the Federal District was called to respond to the incident, initially reported as a rape situation. Those involved presented conflicting information about what happened to the military.

The three involved were taken to the Planaltina Regional Hospital by the Military Fire Department — Eduardo and the homeless man were injured, and the woman was in shock. The personal trainer was then released.

== Investigation ==
The three involved gave statements to the 16th Police Station and were soon released. The delegate in charge, Diogo Cavalcante, told TV Globo that "the case is sensitive, the investigation was kept confidential and, therefore, we will not disclose details until the case is finalized".

On March 18, traces were collected in the car, such as blood samples and other residues.

=== Statements ===
==== Wife and homeless man ====
The woman said she was approached by the homeless man, who asked for money. As she didn't have, he asked to see a bible that Eduardo had given her. Then the homeless man reportedly asked for a hug, and the two got into her car. She then decided to arrange a meeting with the homeless man, at the Planaltina station. She went to the agreed place and waited for the man to arrive. Both then entered the vehicle and had sex with her consent. The woman further claimed that she saw "images of her husband and God" in the homeless man, and that she had not ingested drugs or alcohol. The homeless man said that "the sexual relationship was consensual and at the invitation of the personal's wife, who was carrying out a charity action for homeless people in the region".

==== Eduardo ====
Shortly after the case, Eduardo told police that he thought his wife was being raped by the homeless man, and stated that the woman faces psychological problems. He said on March 16 that he trusts the investigation and that "[the] family has given her full support, we are following the medical evolution". He also made an appeal on social media so that the situation is not treated as an episode of betrayal, but of sexual abuse. The next day, he gave an interview to Cidade Alerta explaining what had happened. He later said that the marriage would continue, believing that the woman had an outbreak and "was in a trance", without being aware of what she was doing: "I know the person I lived with, that I live with, in this case [...] it's been three years [of relationship], I know her, it's not her nature".

== Result ==
As informed by the couple's lawyer on March 16, the wife is hospitalized in a private hospital: "She is receiving clinical and psychiatric support, according to the protocol of care for this type of violence".

The homeless man had already been released from the hospital, but said he was afraid to return to the streets due to the repercussion of the case, remaining in the health unit. He was welcomed on the 17th by the Social Development Department of the Federal District and received in a shelter in Planaltina.

== Repercussion ==
The case had national repercussions from the 15th of March, and several internet memes were created in its reference. The image of a person who would be the hospitalized homeless person circulated on social media, but the Planaltina Regional Hospital did not confirm his identity.
