= Labour Force Survey =

European statistic surveys

Labour Force Surveys are statistical surveys conducted in a number of countries designed to capture data about the labour market. All European Union member states are required to conduct a Labour Force Survey annually. Labour Force Surveys are also carried out in some non-EU countries. They are used to calculate the International Labour Organization (ILO)-defined unemployment rate. The ILO agrees the definitions and concepts employed in Labour Force Surveys.

== History ==
=== United States ===
In 1940, the Works Progress Administration started the Monthly Report of Unemployment, a national sample survey of households. In 1942, it was transferred to the Census Bureau with the new name of the Monthly Report on the Labor Force. It further became the Current Population Survey in 1948 with a wider scope of demographic, social, and economic characteristics of the population. While the Census Bureau has continued to collect the data, the Bureau of Labor Statistics has been in charge of analysis and publicationof the labour force data from the Survey since 1952.

=== Japan ===
The Statistics Bureau of Japan has conducted the Labour Force Survey (労働力調査, Rōdōryoku Chōsa) every month since September 1946, which was modeled after the United States' Monthly Report on the Labor Force. Its questionnaire was modified in May 1949 to meet the Resolution by the 6th International Conference of Labour Statisticians of the International Labour Organization (ILO) in 1947. After some additional changes in sampling, questionnaires, and survey methods, the main framework of the LFS was almost finalized by 1967 and has offered the long-term time-series data since then. It also offers data from extra surveys that have been published as "Detailed Tabulation" containing supplemental findings in addition to the LFS main results.

=== France ===
In 1950, the National Institute of Statistics and Economic Studies (INSEE) started the Employment Survey as an annual survey. It has been conducted every week since 2003, using the name of the Employment, Unemployment and Inactivity Survey, also known as the Continuous Employment Survey. It is the only French source for the data about economic activity, employment, and unemployment as defined by the guidelines of International Labour Office and Eurostat. In 2021, the INSEE introduced the new questionnaire in line with the new European regulation and the new protocol with possibility of use of the Internet for re-interviewing.

=== Australia ===
The first Australian LFS was conducted by the Australian Bureau of Statistics (ABS) in November 1960. Initially, the LFS was conducted only in state capitals, in February, May, August, and November, but in February 1964 it was rolled out to the whole of Australia. The last quarterly survey was conducted in November 1977. The LFS became monthly in February 1978, when the range of topics covered was increased and the LFS measure became the official measure of unemployment.

=== South Korea ===
Statistics Korea has conducted the Economically Active Population Survey since 1962. It became a monthly survey in 1982. Additional surveys have also been conducted.

=== Spain ===
The National Institute of Statistics (INE) has conducted the Economically Active Population Survey since 1964. It was on a quarterly basis during 1964–1968, twice a year during 1969–1974, quarterly during 1975–1998, and "continuous" (weekly) in 1999 onward. Upon Spain's incorporation into the European Communities in 1986, the questionnaire was modified in accordance with the recommendations by the 13th International Conference of Labour Statisticians of the ILO (1982) as well as the European Community Labour Force Survey. It recently experienced major methodological changes in 2002 (new definition of unemployment), in 2005 (new questionnaire and computer-assisted telephone survey method), and in 2021 (to adapt the new European regulations 2019). The Survey methods also follow the ILO resolutions of 2013 and 2018.

=== United Kingdom ===
The Office for National Statistics (ONS) conducted the United Kingdom's first Labour Force Survey in 1973 and repeated it every two years until 1983. It is curated by the UK Data Service and can be accessed for research through them . The European Community then introduced a requirement for all of its member states to conduct an LFS (following Brexit the UK is now no longer a member state) and the ONS introduced a quarterly element to its LFS. The UK switched to a full quarterly survey in 1992, initially with seasonal quarters but moving to calendar quarters in 2006.

=== New Zealand ===
New Zealand's quarterly Household Labour Force Survey was established in December 1985. It was revised in 1990 to include new variables including underemployment.

=== Switzerland ===
The Federal Statistical Office started the Swiss Labour Force Survey in 1991 as an annual survey. The Survey data is comparable with OECD and EU LFS data. Since 2010, it has been conducted on a continuous basis.

=== European Union ===
Prior to 1998, EU member states were required to conduct an LFS in one quarter per year, but as a result of Council Regulation (EEC) No. 577/98 of 9 March 1998 they are now expected to submit LFS results for every quarter to Eurostat. Most, though not all, participating countries changed their LFSs to continuous surveys in the period 1998 to 2004. Responsibility for sample selection, questionnaire design and fieldwork lies with member states' national statistical offices, who then forward the results to Eurostat, employing a common coding scheme.

The EU LFS, as it is known, covers not only the EU member states but also three of the four European Free Trade Association countries (Iceland, Norway and Switzerland) and candidate countries.

=== Brazil ===
The Brazilian Institute of Geography and Statistics started the PNAD in 1967 as an annual survey. Since 2012, it has been renamed to PNADC (Continuous National Household Sample Survey) and conducted on a continuous basis.

The survey produces monthly indicators related to the workforce for the geographic level of Brazil, quarterly indicators on the workforce for all levels of the survey dissemination and annual indicators on permanent supplementary themes (such as labor and other forms of work, personal care and household chores, information and communication technology, etc.), investigated in a specific quarter or applied to a part of the sample each quarter and accumulated to generate annual results, with indicators on other supplementary topics also being produced at varying intervals.

== Usage ==
In addition to being used to generate official statistics, data from the LFS are employed by academics and other researchers. In the UK, for example, the LFS has been used as a data source for research projects on topics such as female employment, the economic returns to education, migration and ethnic minority groups.
