= Tia Neiva =

Medium, founder of Vale do Amanhecer (1926–1985)

Tia Neiva (born Neiva Chavez Zelaya, 1926–1985) was a Brazilian medium and founder of the community Christian spiritualist Vale do Amanhecer (Dawn Valley) located in the Planaltina, Federal District, Brazil.

== Early life ==
She was born in Propriá, in the state of Sergipe, in 1926. Until 1959, when she was 33, Neiva Chavez Zelaya was an unremarkable woman and had not manifested any public mediunic tendencies. The only trait that set her apart was that she had become a truck driver after her husband died and left her with four children to raise. Neiva went to Federal District, where she rented one of her two trucks to Novacap, the company that built the new capital.

== Career ==
According to her memoirs the first mediunic manifestations bothered her a lot, since she was Catholic and did not feel comfortable with the paranormal powers. She sought out explanations in Spiritualism but could not adapt. Immersed in what the spirits told her she gave up her professional life and worked to implant the system that today is known as the Vale do Amanhecer.

According to her own writings, as soon as she was able to dominate the technique of projecting her body, she began to visit other spiritual plains, where she received instructions that she applied among her community of mediums. Among the teachers of Tia Neiva was a Tibetan monk called Umahã, who she allegedly visited daily between 1959 and 1964 and who supposedly died in 1981.

In 1963 she caught a respiratory disease and was interned in a tuberculosis sanitarium in Belo Horizonte, Minas Gerais. She got better but began to breathe with only a small area of her lungs until her death in 1985.

== Legacy ==
The first community founded by Tia Neiva was in the Alexânia, Goiás, and was called "União Espiritualista Seta Branca". Seta Branca was the alleged spirit of an Incan who appeared to her and was her mentor. Today he is the central figure of the cult, which includes elements from Christianity, Candomblé, Spiritism, extraterrestrials, and Egyptology. From there she moved to Taguatinga, Federal District, and in 1969 to the place known today as Vale do Amanhecer in the rural zone of Planaltina, Federal District.

In her last years, Tia Neiva was always accompanied by her companion Mário Sassi who was known as Trino Tumuchy. Her children continued her work and are part of the hierarchy of the sect. The most important, Gilberto Zelaya, or Trino Ajarâ in the spirit world, is the First Doctrinator of the Dawn and Coordinator of the Temples of the Dawn.

A large sect has been built around Neiva, who had incredible powers of organisation and ability to convince the authorities to acquire land and funding. According to the official website today there are 589 temples in Brazil and in other countries like Germany, the United States, Japan, and Portugal. The group's membership is 139,000 in 700 temples.

American filmmaker Janell Shirtcliff directed a documentary about Neiva called Mother of the Dawn, which debuted at the 2022 South by Southwest festival.
