= Recanto das Emas =

- Administrative region
- Região Administrativa de Recanto das Emas; Administrative Region of Recanto das Emas
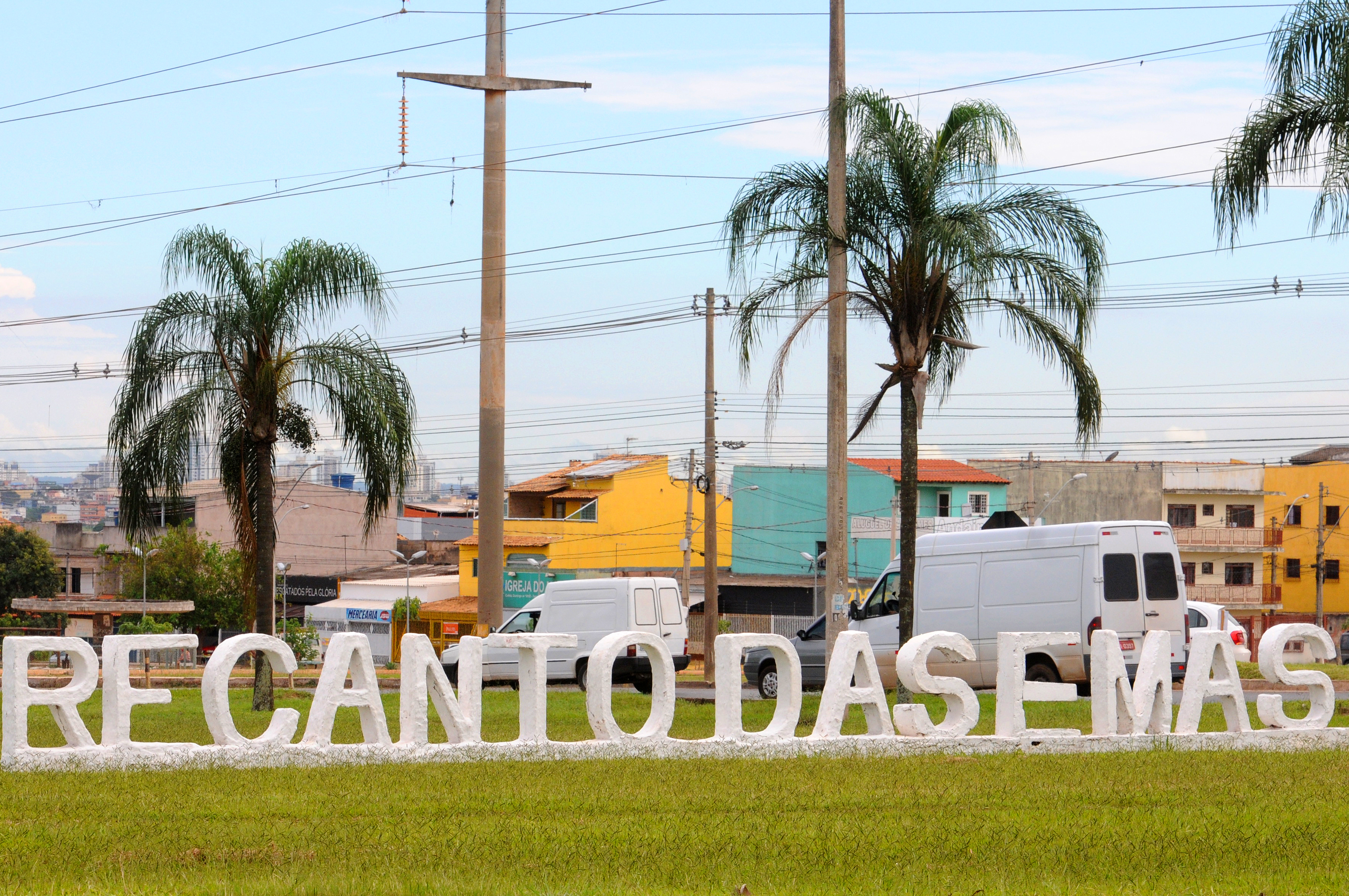
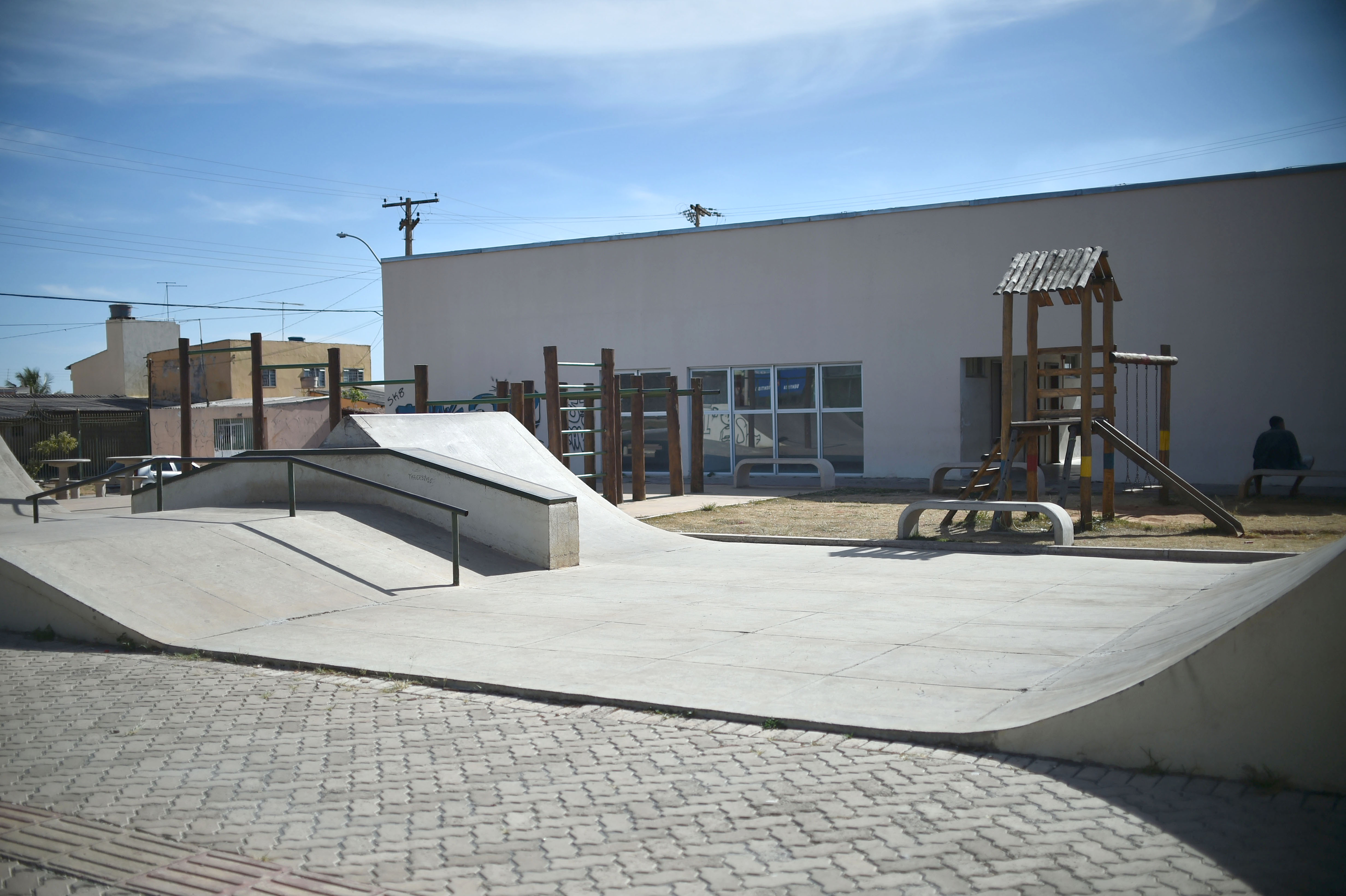
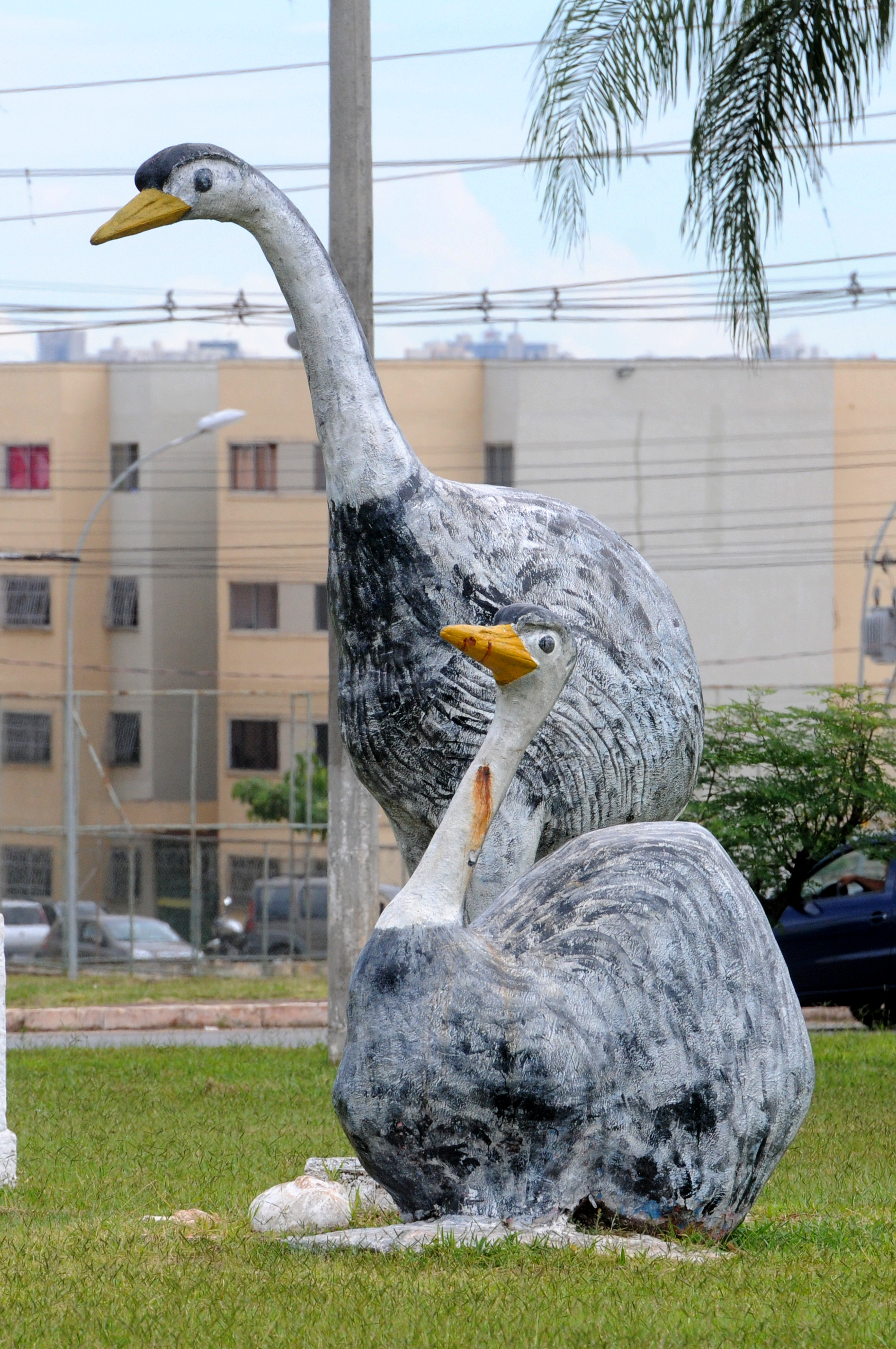
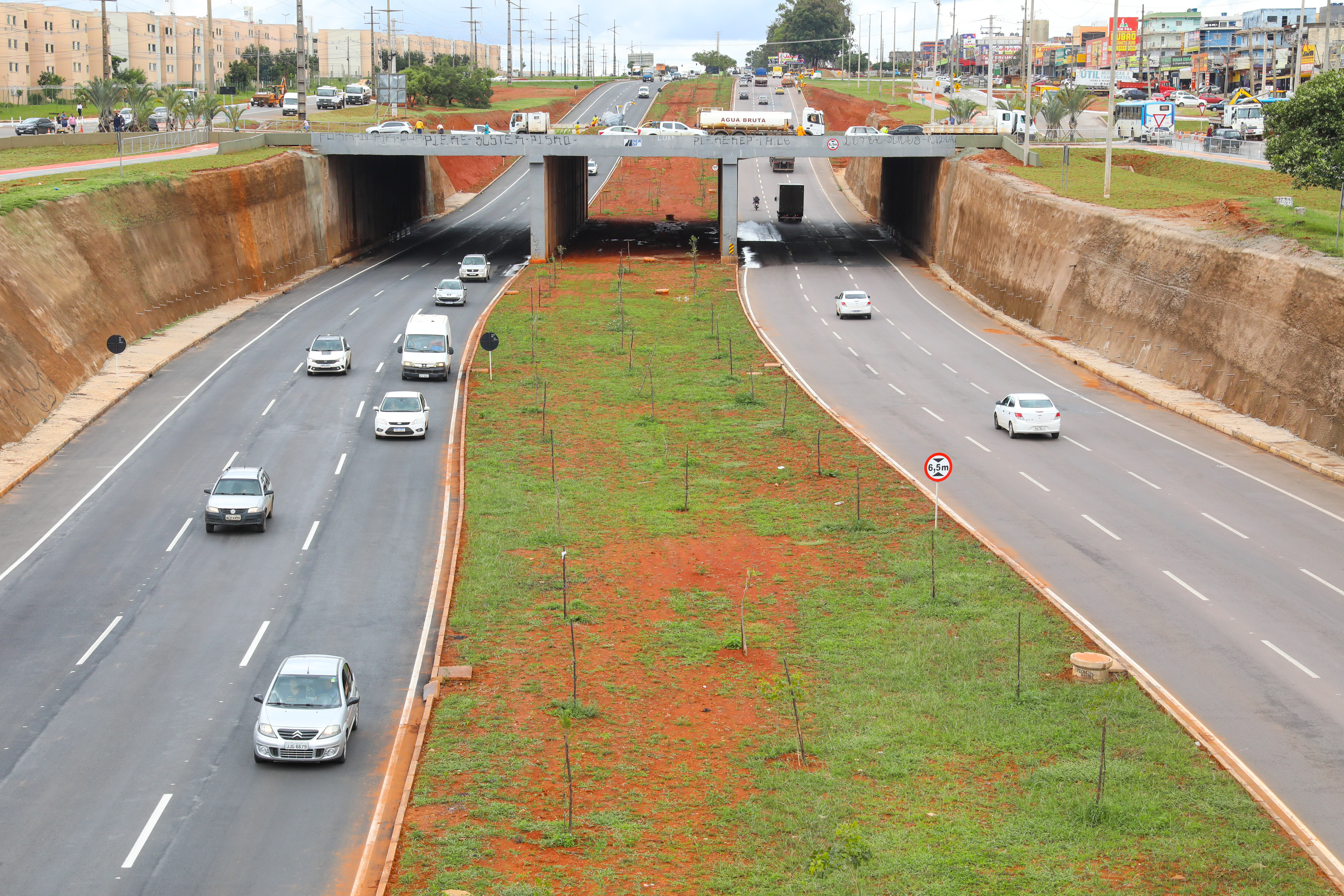
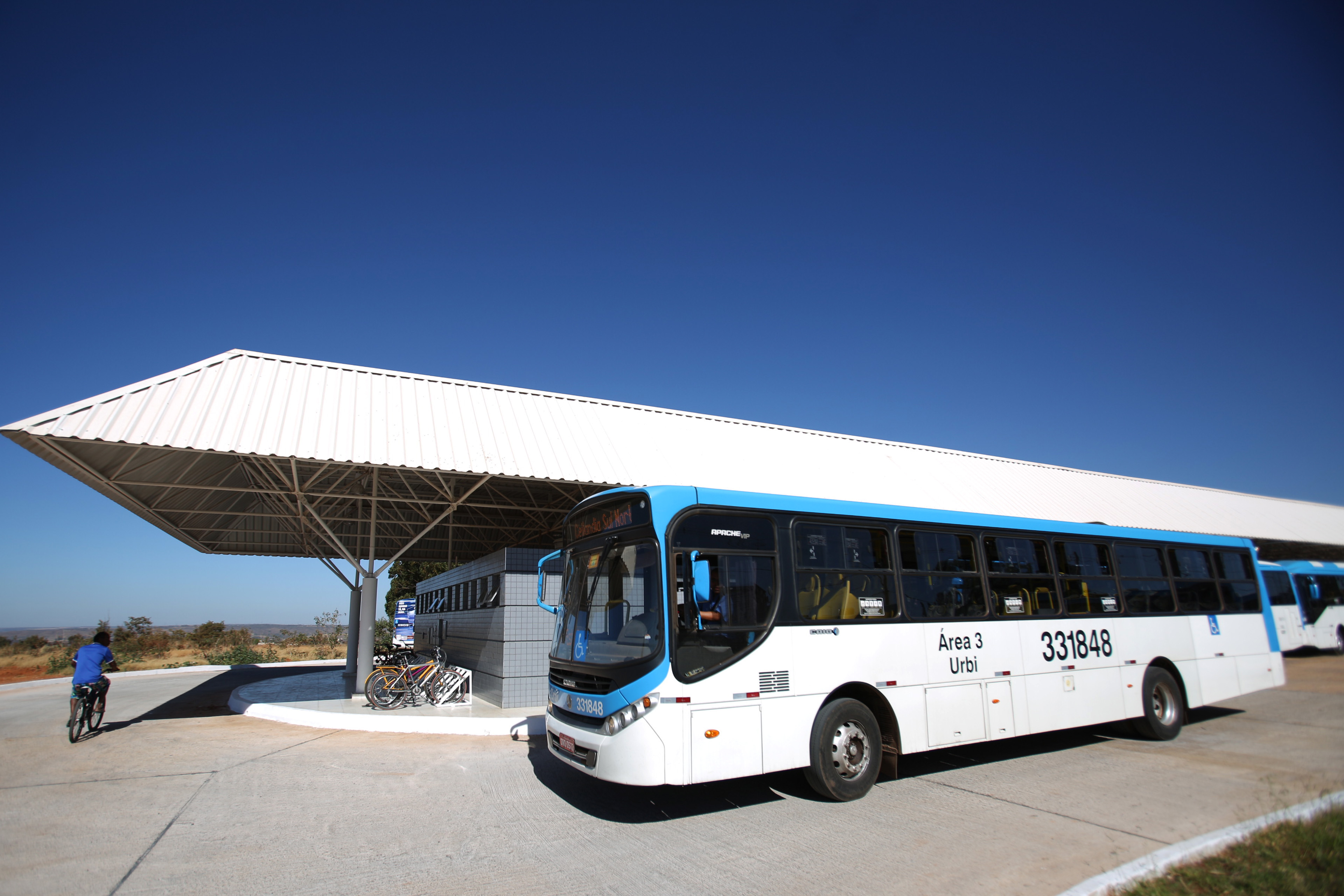
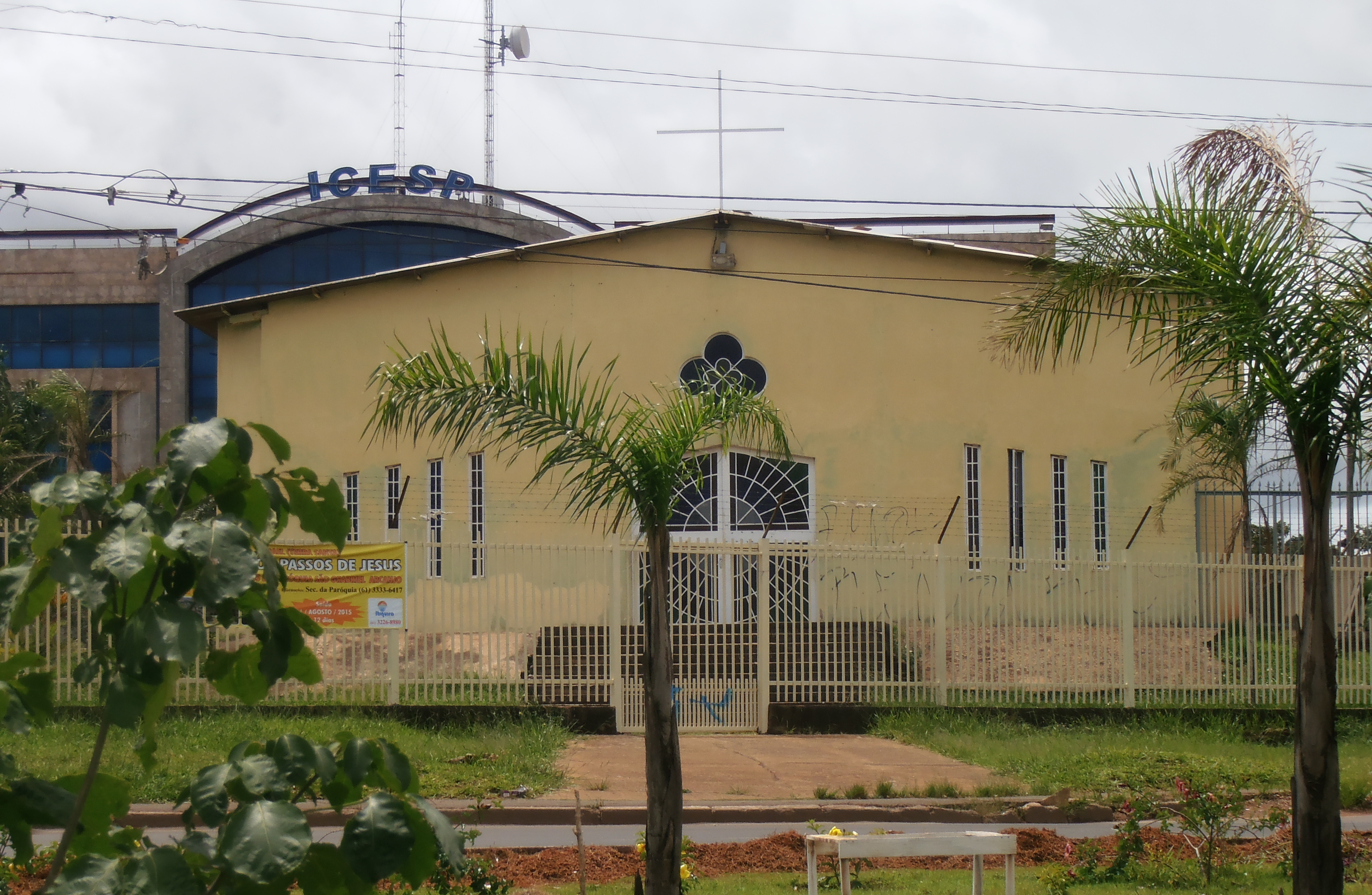
- Clockwise from top: Recanto das Emas sign; Greater rhea sculpture; Recanto das Emas bus terminal; S. Gabriel Arcanjo Chapel; Recanto das Emas viaduct; Unified Arts & Sports Center skatepark

- Localization of Recanto das Emas in Federal District
- Coordinates: 15°54′29″S 48°04′23″W
- Country: Brazil
- Region: Central-West
- State: Federal District
- Founded: July 28, 1993

Government
  - Regional administrator: Paulo Roberto Amâncio da Silva

Area
  - Total: 80.43 km^{2} (31.05 sq mi)

Population (2010)
  - Total: 160,000
- Time zone: UTC−3 (BRT)
- Postal Code (CEP): 72600-000
- Area code: +55 61
- Website: recanto.df.gov.br

Recanto das Emas is an administrative region in the Federal District in Brazil. It is located to the westmost area of the Federal District, being bordered by Samambaia to the north, Riacho Fundo II to the east, Gama to the south, and the border to Goiás to the west. Recanto das Emas was founded on July 28, 1993, receiving the status of administrative region, according to Law 510, of July 28, 1993.

== See also ==
- List of administrative regions of the Federal District
