= BR-020 (Brazil highway) =

Federal highway of Brazil

BR-020

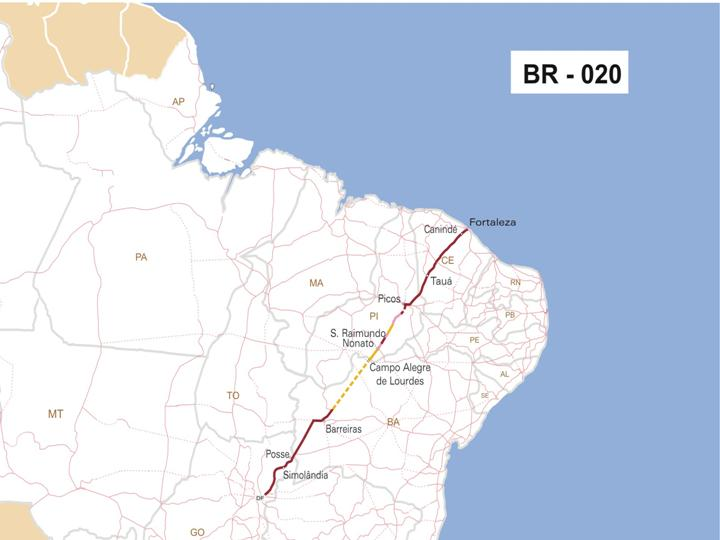

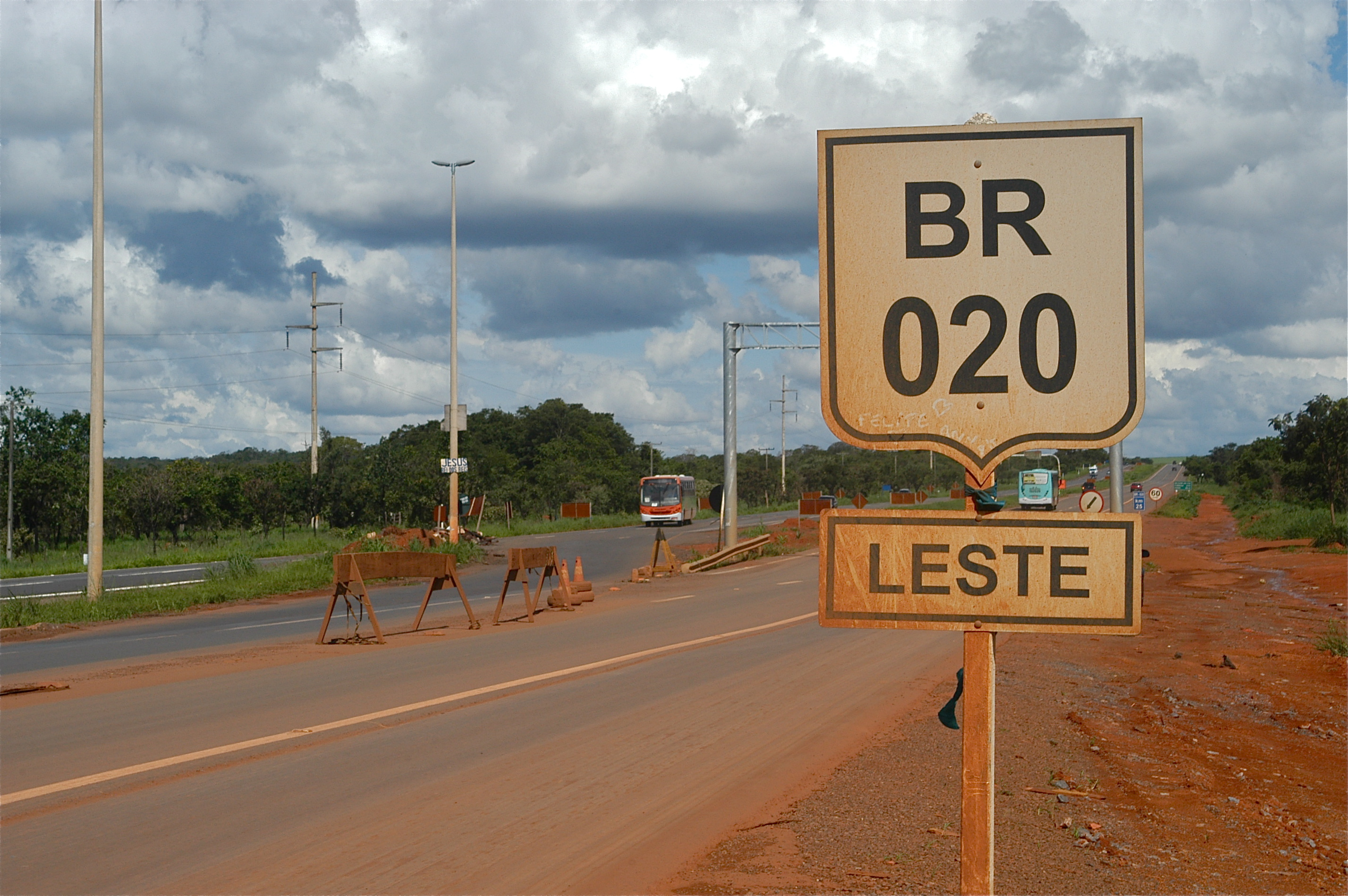
- BR-020 in Planaltina, DF

Route information
- Length: 2,038.5 km (1,266.7 mi)

Major junctions
- North end: Fortaleza, Ceará
- South end: Brasília, Distrito Federal

Location
- Country: Brazil

Highway system
- Highways in Brazil; Federal

BR-020 is a federal highway of Brazil. The 2,038-kilometre (1,266 mi) road connects Fortaleza in Ceará to the federal capital Brasília. It was inaugurated in the government of the president Juscelino Kubitschek.

In the states of Bahía and Piauí, there are long stretches of the road that are made of dirt, and also stretches that have not been built to this day, which are still in the planning stage and unbuilt.

The road passes through the MATOPIBA region (in the south of Piauí and in the west of Bahia), which is an important producer of soybeans, corn and cotton, among other products. It connects the interior of the Northeast to the Port of Mucuripe, in Fortaleza.
