= Valley of the Dawn =

New religious movement founded in the 1960s

Vale do Amanhecer
- Formation: 1969
- Type: New religious movement UFO religion
- Headquarters: Planaltina, Federal District (Brazil)
- Official language: Portuguese
- Mentor: Pai Seta Branca
- Key people: Tia Neiva

Valley of the Dawn (Portuguese: Vale do Amanhecer) is a new religious movement and UFO religion founded in the 1960s in Brazil. With around 600 temples in Brazil and worldwide, it is centered around a mother temple located in an eponymous town in Planaltina, Federal District, Brazil.

== History ==
Conceived by ex-truck driver and medium Tia Neiva (born Neiva Chaves Zelaya—died 1985), it was installed in its present location in 1969. The Valley occupies an area belonging to the government of the Federal District. There are approximately 500 residents, many of whom, according to the official web site, are abandoned children taken in by Tia Neiva. A juridical entity, called Lar das Crianças de Matildes, was created to give legality to the community. Around the Valley there is a community of approximately 20,000 people, many of whom work or have connections to the Valley.

Among the residents are the directors who worked with Tia Neiva, some families of mediums, those who take care of the maintenance, and occasional people taken in to cure alcoholism.

The focal point of the community is the Temple of Vale Do Amanhecer (Temple of Dawn Valley), built of stone, in the form of an ellipse, with a covered area of about 2,400 square metres. Inside you have the impression you are inside a colored labyrinth with several distinct spaces, each one with its function connected to the spiritual works carried out daily. At the back of the temple there is an enormous statue of Pai Seta Branca (lit. "Father White Arrow" in Portuguese), the pre-Columbian spirit who allegedly began to talk to Tia Neiva in 1957 and to guide and aid her (and her/their followers) in the creation of the doctrine, the Temple and, eventually, the Valley. He is always depicted as a nice-looking, young, strong, South American native man, wearing a blue tunic, a long, feathered headdress and leather sandals and holding a white arrow, by which he is known.

== Physical structure ==
Nearby there is a complex built in the open space named Solar dos Médiums composed by the Estrela Candente (Glowing Star) and the Lago de Iemanjá (Lake of Yemanja). The Glowing Star is a construction in format of the Star of David with a radius of 79 meters composed by an artificial waterfall, staircases of stone, and grass huts. The Lake of Yemanja has a big image of Yemanja itself surrounded by seven images of spiritual entities named Doctrinary Princesses, an Egyptian pyramid in its border and an arrow format bridge in the center of the water.

Vale Do Amanhecer has a primary school of more than 200 students, under government control, restaurants, an auto repair shop, and a bookshop specializing in religious and spiritualist works.

== Doctrine ==
The Vale do Amanhecer practices a syncretic religion which incorporates various elements of Christianity, Spiritism, Umbanda, religious beliefs in UFOs and esoteric beliefs.

Two kinds of people attend to Vale Do Amanhecer: Mediums and Visitants (also called patients). The mediums are basically divided into two basic groups in The Dawn Valley: Aparás and Doctriners. Between three and four thousand people visit Vale Do Amanhecer every day seeking help for their spiritual or personal problems.

The Mediums wear special robes with bright colours. Most of the mediums are considered the reincarnation of an extraterrestrial giant people, "the Equitumans" (also known as Jaguars), who supposedly landed on the Earth 32,000 years ago, and later returned in successive reincarnations in civilizations like the Hittites, the Ionians, the Dorians, the Egyptians, the Greeks, the Romans, the Mayans etc. The Equitumans supposedly established themselves in the region of the Andes and are buried in Lake Titicaca, which was formed by a tear of the Glowing Star. According to the cosmology of the followers of the doctrine, Tia Neiva commanded the spiritual mission of this people on the Earth following the orders of the supreme commander, Pai Seta Branca (Father White Arrow), who seems to be an amalgam of several indigenous figures, Incan and American-Indian. Valley of the Dawn members perform spirit-healing rituals called “trabalhos,” or works, daily at their main temple outside Brasília.
