= Planaltina, Federal District =

Administrative region in Brazil

Planaltina
- Administrative region
- Região Administrativa de Planaltina; Administrative Region of Planaltina
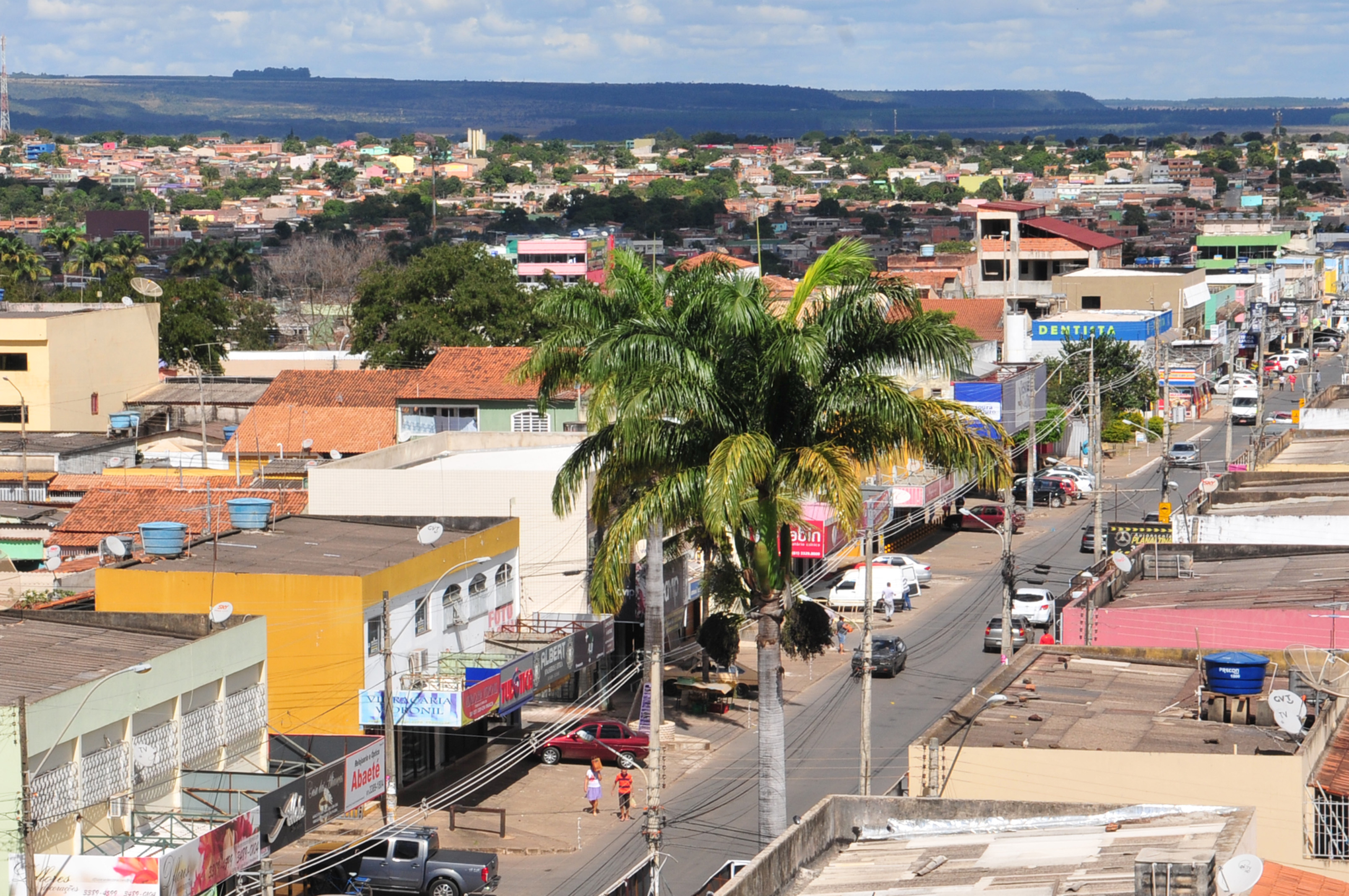
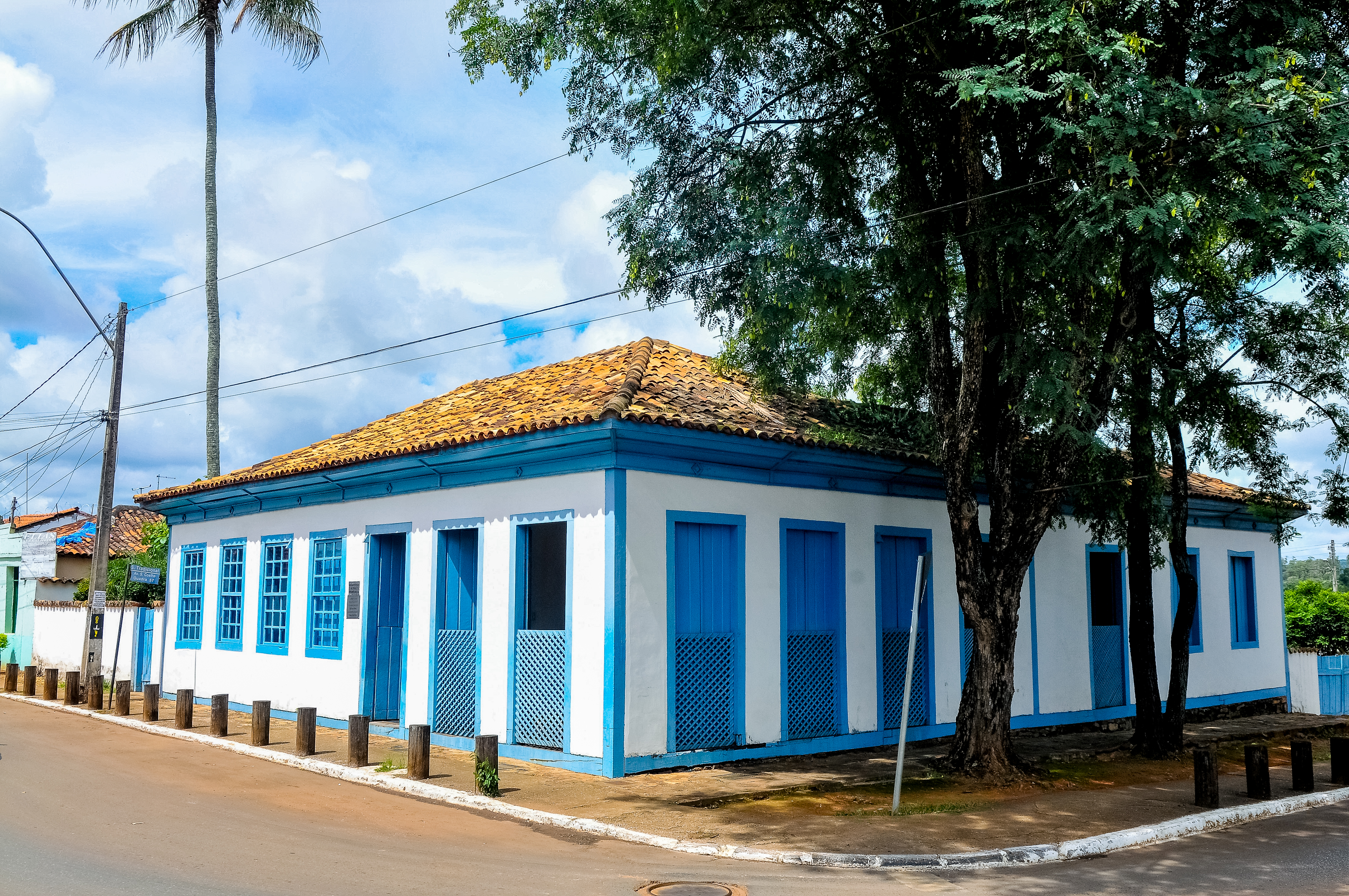
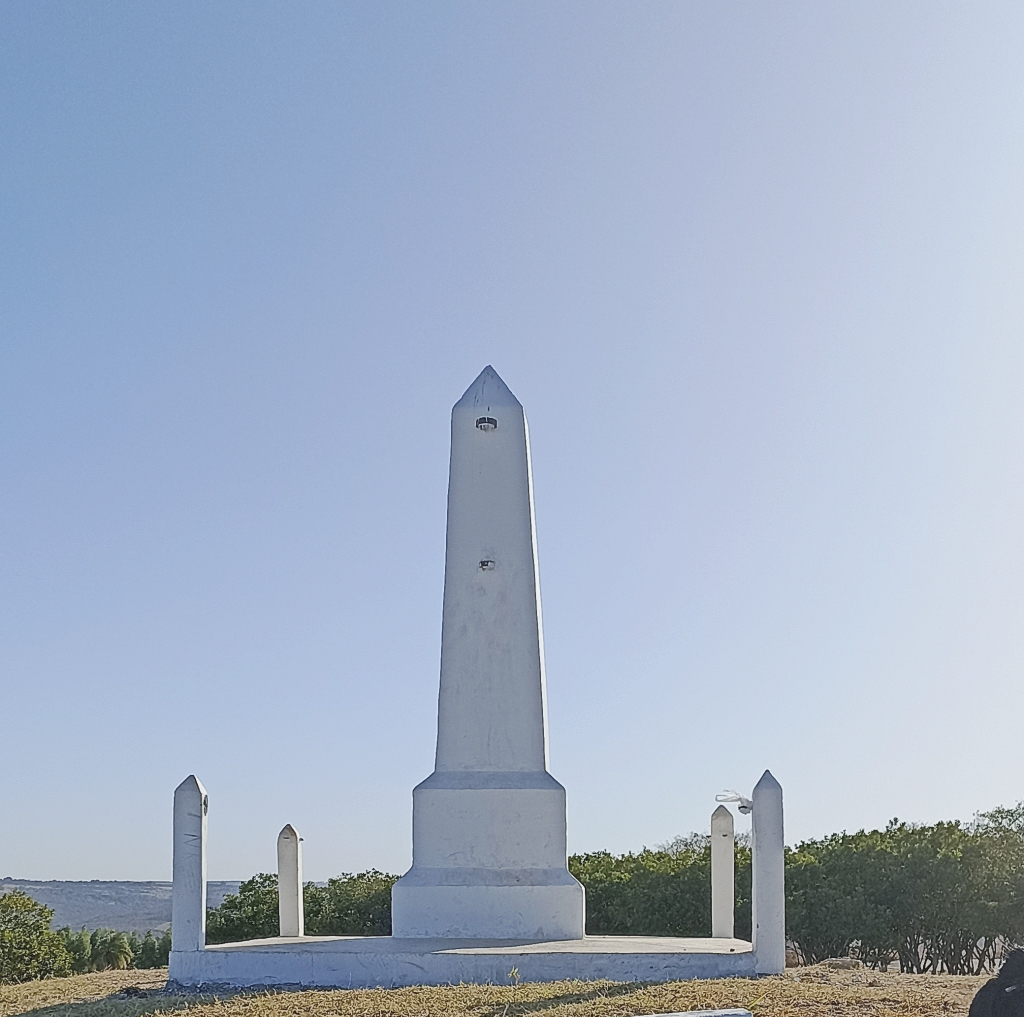
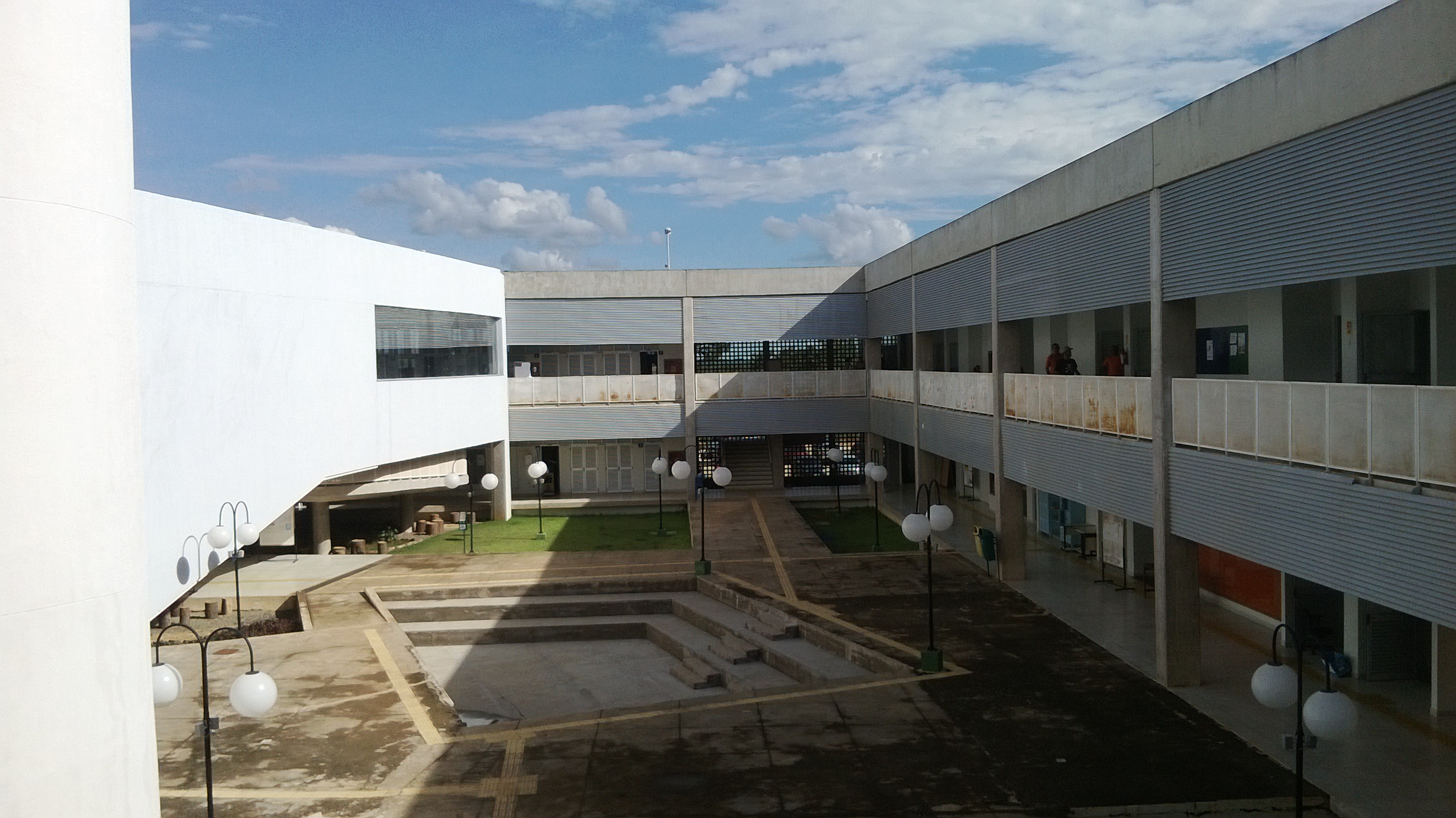
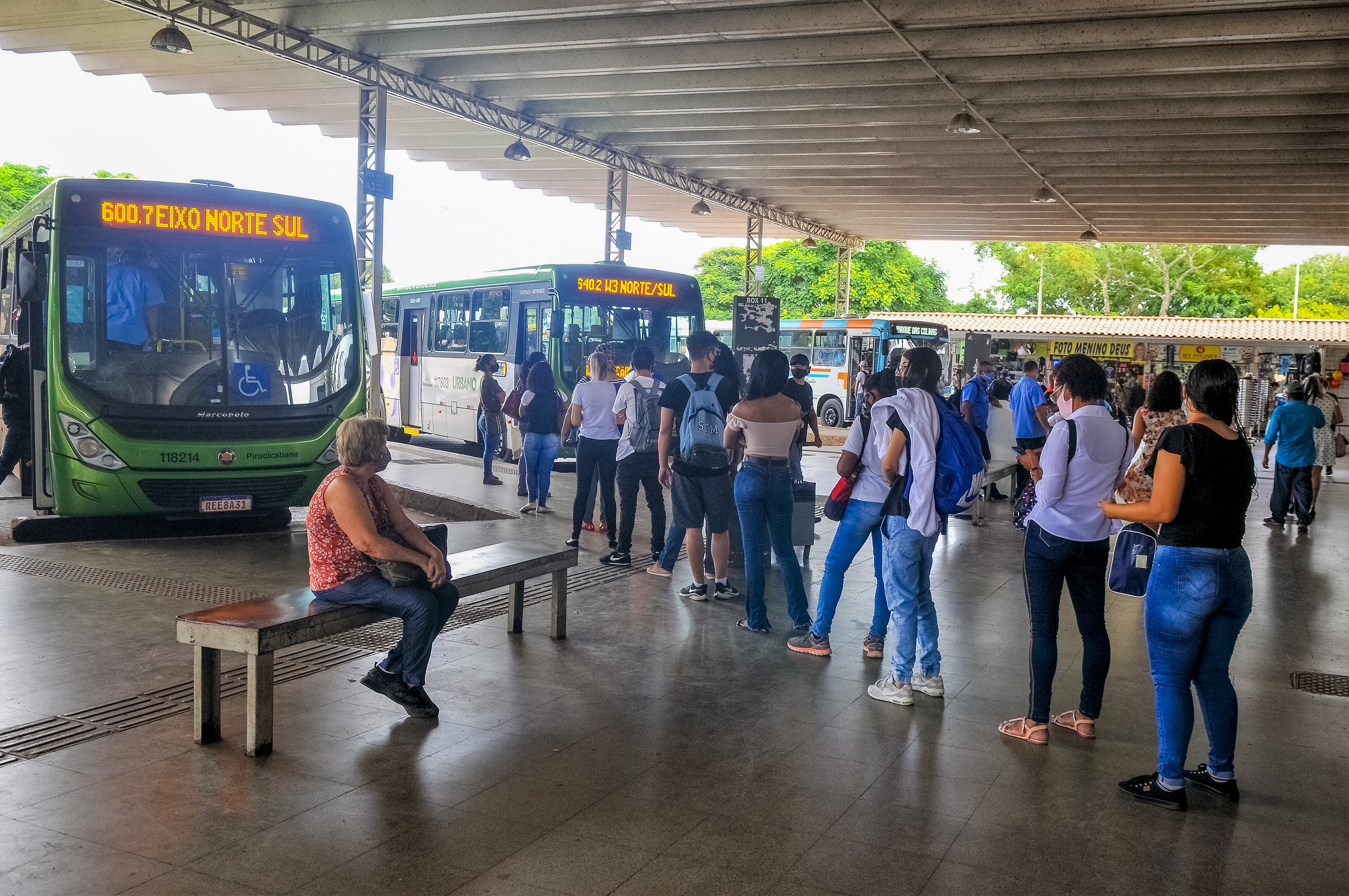
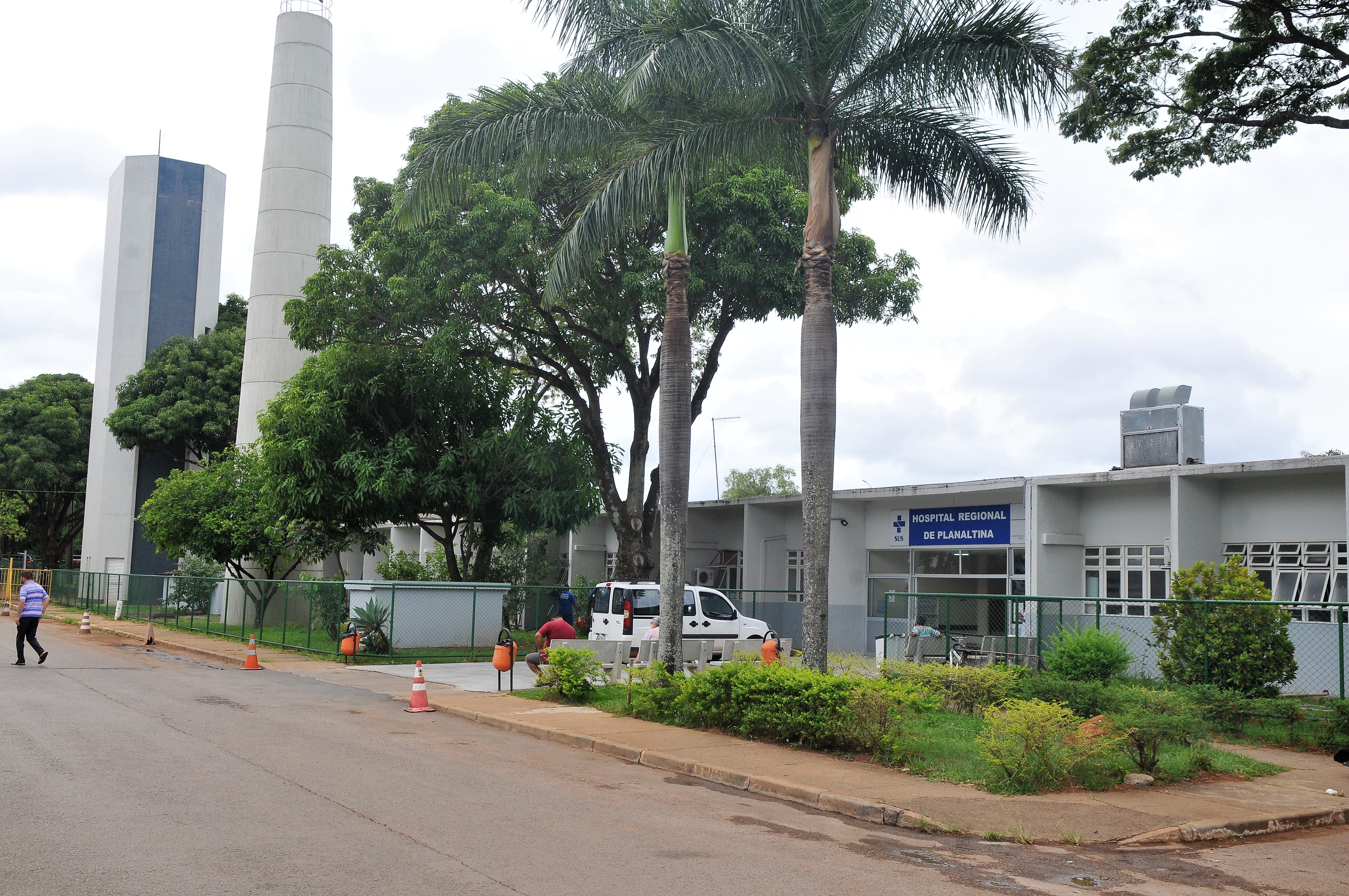
- Clockwise from top: Aerial view, Pedra Fundamental, Planaltina bus terminal, Planaltina Regional Hospital, UnB Planaltina Campus, Planaltina Historic Center Museum

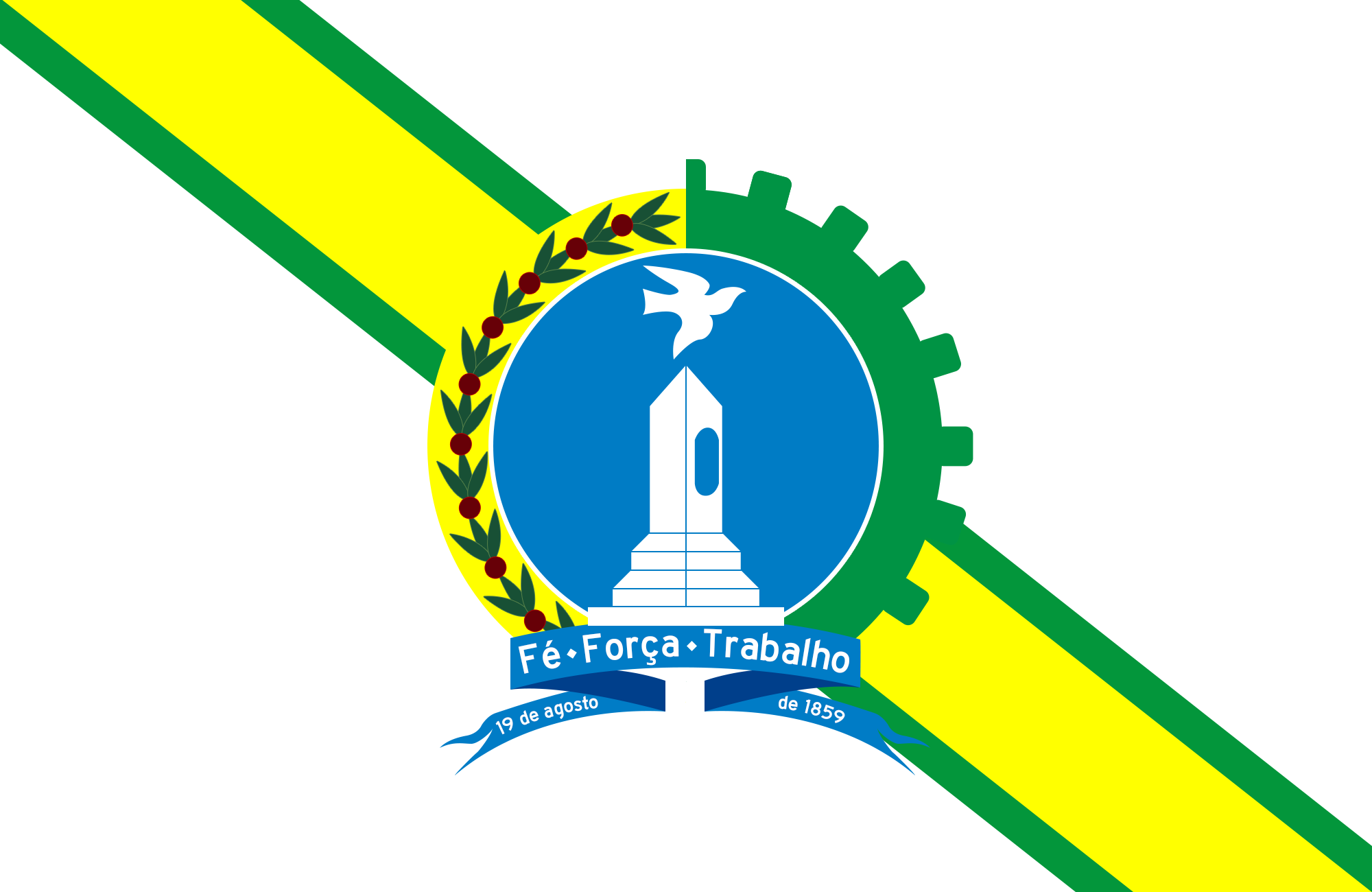
- Flag

- Localization of Planaltina in Federal District

- Localization of Planaltina in Brazil
- Coordinates: 15°37′09″S 47°39′09″W
- Country: Brazil
- Region: Central-West
- State: Federal District
- Founded: August 19, 1859

Government
  - Regional administrator: Vicente Salgueiro Baño Salgado

Area
  - Total: 1,534.69 km^{2} (592.55 sq mi)
- Elevation: 1,000 m (3,300 ft)

Population (2010)
  - Total: 164,939
  - Density: 11/km^{2} (28/sq mi)
- Demonym: Planaltinense
- Time zone: UTC−3 (BRT)
- Postal Code (CEP): 73300-000
- Area code: +55 61
- Website: www.planaltina.df.gov.br

Planaltina (Portuguese pronunciation: [plɐ.nawˈtʃi.nɐ]) is an administrative region in the Federal District in Brazil. It is located in the east of the Federal District, bordering Fercal, Sobradinho, and Itapoã to the west, and Paranoá to the south. With an area of 1.534 square kilometers, it is the largest administrative region of the Federal District. Planaltina has a population of 177.540. The region seat was founded in 1859 and is the oldest city in the Federal District.

== History ==
Beginning in the first half of the 18th century, bandeirantes came to this region looking for gold and emeralds. Existing documents do not tell us the exact date of the foundation of Planaltina, but it is believed to be 1790. According to oral tradition, the first name of the settlement was Mestre d'Armas because a blacksmith, an expert in weapons (armas), settled in the region.

The founding of the nucleus, which gave birth to Planaltina is attributed to José Gomes Rabelo, a rancher who transferred from the former capital of the province of Goiás, to a small lake called Lagoa Bonita, later extending his land to the dwelling known as "Mestre d'Armas". A chapel was erected to pay homage to Saint Sebastian, who had supposedly spared the settlers from an epidemic that attacked them at the time. Dona Marta Carlos Alarcão ordered a wooden statue of the saint from Portugal, which was later substituted for a larger one when the church was expanded.

On 19 August 1859 the Assembléia Provincial de Goiás, created the District of Mestre d'Armas, which belonged to the municipality of Formosa, Goiás. This date became the official date of the foundation of the city of Planaltina. In 1891, the Arraial de São Sebastião de Mestre d'Armas was raised to the category of Vila by a decree of the governor of the province, Antônio de Faria Albernaz, separating from Formosa.

In 1892, the Vila was officially installed, after the donation of houses for the establishment of the government, the jail, and a school. In this same year, the Cruls Commission came to the area to make the first studies for the implantation of the future national capital. The commission was made up of astronomers, doctors, pharmacists, geologists, botanists, etc. As a result of their work, an area of 14,400 km^{2} was set aside on paper where the future capital would be built. A report was also published giving details on the conditions of the region. Only much later would these studies be put into practice.

In 1910, the name of the town, Mestre d'Armas, was changed to Altamir, because of the beauty of the place seen from the surrounding heights.

After 1917, the town began to attract small industries and dried meat producers, tanneries, shoe factories, a hydroelectric plant and a road linking Planaltina to Ipameri. In the same year the name was changed to Planaltina.

In 1922, the centennial of Brazilian independence was celebrated and the national Deputy Americano do Brasil presented plans to the Chamber of Deputies and placed the Founding Stone of the future capital.

The national President, Epitácio Pessoa, made a decree establishing the Founding Stone and designated the engineer Balduino Ernesto de Almeida, Director of the Railroad in Goiás, to lead the mission.

On 7 September 1922, with a caravan consisting of 40 people the founding stone was placed on Centenário Hill, located 9 km from the town.

In the decade of the 1930s, there was a cooling off of the movement to relocate the capital, but in 1945 the question was taken up again and Planaltina played host to a commission headed by President Eurico Gaspar Dutra.

In 1955, the commission headed by Marshal José Pessoa established the area and the location of the new capital. The square of the Federal District occupied an area of 5,814 km^{2} and was superimposed on three municipalities of Goiás, one of which was Planaltina, which saw its territory divided in two, with its nucleus remaining inside the Federal District. It lost then its position of a municipality and became an administrative region.

The part that was left in the state of Goiás became known as Planaltina de Goiás, popularly called Brasilinha.

After 1966 Planaltina underwent periodic changes with the establishment of housing tracts (loteamentos) to receive people who could not be settled in the Brasília. Some of these were Vila Vicentina, Setor Residencial Leste (Vila Buritis I, II, e III), Setor Residencial Norte A (Jardim Roriz) and an expansion of the Traditional Sector.

In 1990, after 30 years of belonging to the Federal District, Planaltina, like the other administrative regions, voted for governor, senator and district deputy.

Planaltina was founded on August 19, 1859, receiving the status of administrative region, according to Law 4545, of December 10, 1964.

== Overview ==
Originally a municipality of the state of Goiás dating from before the eighteenth century, it had part of its territory integrated into the new Federal District, when the capital was transferred from Rio de Janeiro to Brasília in 1960. To serve as the seat of the remaining municipality belonging to the state of Goiás, a small city was built, which also has the name Planaltina, but popularly known as Brasilinha (little Brasília). Planaltina, D.F., is therefore the oldest urban area of the Federal District. In recent years it has grown haphazardly with many new housing areas being built to accommodate landless and homeless migrants who arrive daily looking for work in Brasília.

Today Planaltina is a divided city. The traditional sector keeps the characteristics of the interior. The buildings preserve an architecture dating from the end of the nineteenth century and the calm atmosphere reminds one of a small interior town. The new neighbourhoods, on the other hand, are crowded and lack infrastructure and basic services, such as health and education.

According to research carried out by Companhia do Planalto Central (Codeplan) in 2004, more than 80% of the inhabitants of the urban area of Planaltina live without rain drainage and 45% do not have a sewage system. Likewise, 53% of the houses are on unpaved streets and 26% have no public lighting.

With an area of 1,534 kmª (26.5% of the total area of 5,789.16) and a population of 147,114 (7.1% of the total of 2,051,146) in 2000, of whom 134,663 were classified as urban and 12,451 as rural. It is located in the east of the Federal District, approximately 43 kilometers from Brasília and can by reached by federal highway BR-020 (Brasília–Fortaleza). Planaltina is by far the largest of the administrative regions by area and, with a population density of 95.8 per square kilometer, it is the second most sparsely populated.

The municipality contains the 10,547 hectares (26,060 acres) Águas Emendadas Ecological Station, a fully protected conservation unit that dates back to 1968 and preserves samples of various types of cerrado vegetation.

== Health ==
Planaltina is served by a regional hospital with 17 specialties. In 2002, there were 167 beds available. There are also three health centers in the urban area and 6 in the rural area.

== Education ==
In 2004 there were 79 schools in the city and rural areas of which 65 were public. Public schools had over 600 classrooms. There was one library with over 5,000 books. There was one secondary agricultural school and one nursing school connected to the hospital. There were two university campuses connected to agriculture, one of the private UPIS and another of the federal university, University of Brasília (UnB).

In 2004 the education levels were the following:

- Illiterate: 3.9%
- Can only read and write: 1.4%
- Pre-school: 2.0%
- Incomplete primary school: 41.1%
- Finished primary school: 11.6%
- Incomplete secondary school: 7.8%
- Finished secondary school: 16.2%
- Incomplete university: 1.8%
- Finished university: 1.7%
- Under the age of 7 without school: 11.4%

== Religion ==
In 2005, there were 4 Catholic churches, 67 Protestant churches, 2 Spiritist, and 22 unclassified churches. Planaltina is the center of the syncretic religion known as "Doutrina do Amanhecer", whose holy city, Vale do Amanhecer (Valley of Dawn) is within the administrative region of Planaltina.

== Labor ==
In 2000, the working population was divided thus:

- agriculture: 13%
- civil construction: 78%
- transformation industry: 26%

The gross monthly family income in 2000 was 5.0 minimum salaries while the per capita monthly income was 1.28 minimum salaries. 36% of the workers made between 2 and 5 minimum salaries.

== Economy ==
In 2004 there were 45,200 head of cattle, 33,022 pigs, 2,700 sheep, and 5.7 million chickens. Agricultural production was the following:

- beans: 7,296 hectares
- corn: 19,198 hectares
- soy beans: 32,000 hectares
- wheat: 675 hectares

There was also substantial production of garden vegetables to supply the Brasília market and fruits, including oranges, guava, lemon, passion fruit, and mangos.

== Tourist sites ==
Planaltina has the oldest church in the Planalto Central. An Igrejinha, as it is known by locals, was built around 1870, and financed by the families of Gomes Rabelo and Alarcão, who built the chapel in homage to Saint Sebastian, the saint who had supposedly saved the settlement from an epidemic.

The Igrejinha de São Sebastião was declared a monument by Patrimônio Histórico e Artístico do Distrito Federal, in 1980, and today it is no longer used for religious celebrations. It still preserves details of the period in which it was built, such as the original stone floor.

In the outskirts, at a distance of about 6 km. from the city, is the mystical community of Vale do Amanhecer, which has its own school and services for a population of over 5,000 people.

== See also ==
- List of administrative regions of the Federal District
