= Codeplan =

Company of Planning of Federal District
- Companhia de Planejamento do Distrito Federal
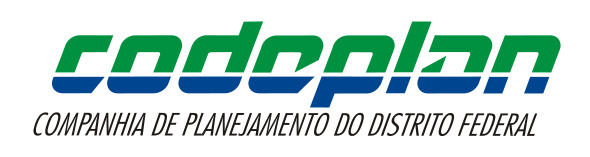

Government-owned corporation overview
- Formed: December 10, 1964
- Preceding Government-owned corporation: Companhia do Desenvolvimento do Planalto Central
- Jurisdiction: Government of Federal District, Brazil
- Headquarters: Brasília, Federal District, Brazil
- Government-owned corporation executive: Júlio Flávio Gameiro Miragaya, President
- Website: http://www.codeplan.df.gov.br

Companhia de Planejamento do Distrito Federal - CODEPLAN (Company of Planning of Federal District) is a company of the government of Federal District, Brazil, which is responsible for the actions of planning and development of that region.

At its creation, it was named "Companhia do Desenvolvimento do Planalto Central" and remained active until March 2, 2007, when it was renamed in the current form.
