= Pesquisa Nacional por Amostra de Domicílios =

Pesquisa Nacional por Amostra de Domicílios, often known by its acronym PNAD, is Brazil's National Household Sample Survey, a research project conducted by the Brazilian Institute of Geography and Statistics (Portuguese: Instituto Brasileiro de Geografia e Estatística; IBGE) to gather socio-economic and demographic information about the population of Brazil. The PNAD survey covers a wide range of topics, including income, education, employment, housing, health, and migration. It began in 1967 and expanded nationwide by 1981.

PNAD is one of the primary sources of information for the development, monitoring, and evaluation of public policies in Brazil. The data collected by the survey is used to inform government programs and to allocate resources for various social initiatives It also serves as an essential tool for researchers, policymakers, and organizations seeking to understand the social dynamics and living conditions of the Brazilian population.

PNAD uses a stratified sampling method, which means the country is divided into different geographical strata and households are randomly selected within each stratum to participate in the survey. This approach ensures that the sample is representative of the entire population, taking into account regional, urban, and rural variations. The data is collected through face-to-face and telephone interviews conducted by trained IBGE interviewers.

PNAD is primarily focused on collecting data on employment, education, living conditions, household income, migration, marriage, nutrition, fertility, and other characteristics of the Brazilian population. The survey was conducted annually but has become an ongoing project, known as the Continuous PNAD (PNAD Contínua), beginning experimentally in October 2011 and definitively in January 2012.

Participation in PNAD is voluntary, although it is encouraged to ensure accurate representation of the population.

== See also ==
- American Community Survey
- United States census
