= List of missing ships =

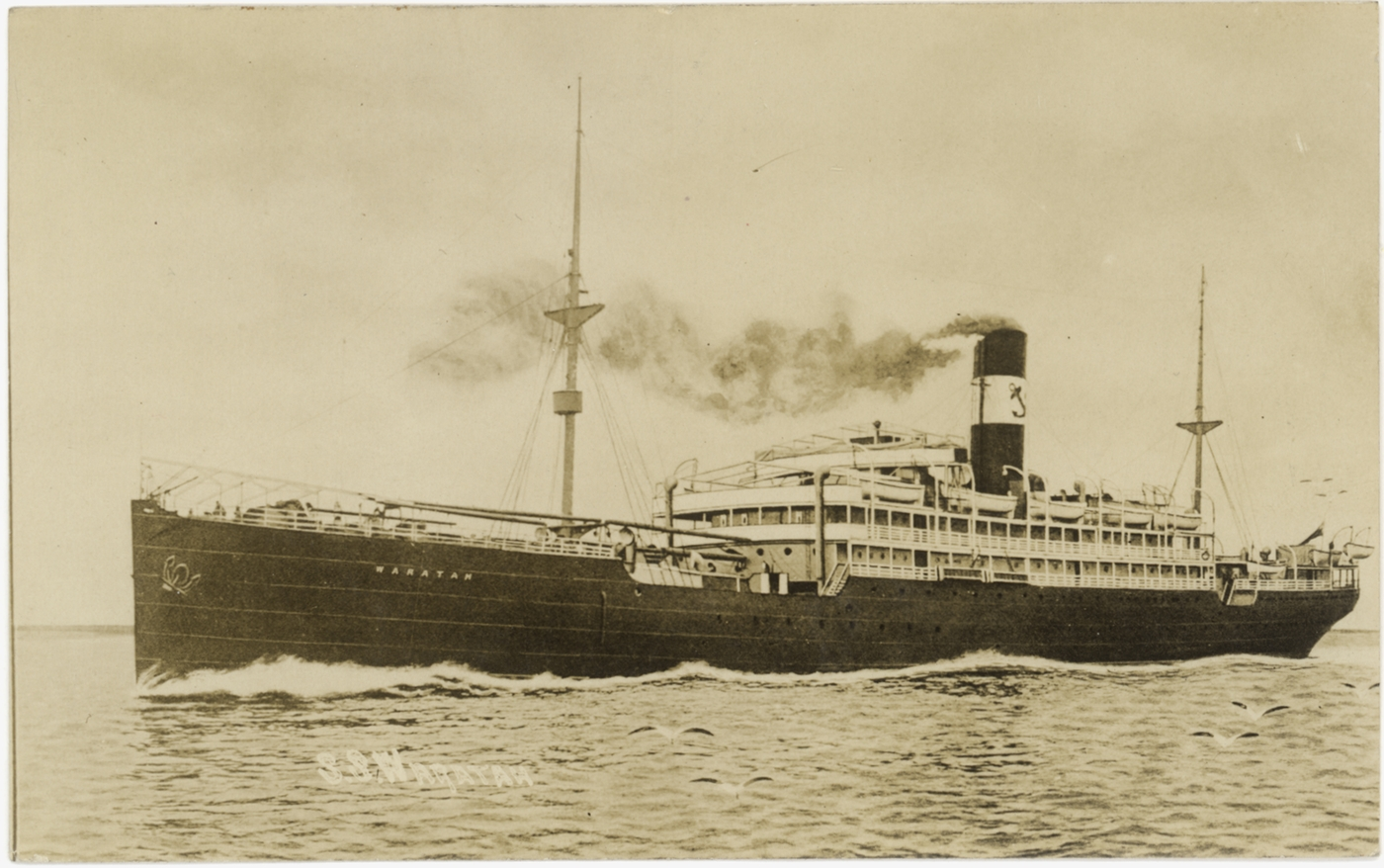
SS Waratah and its 211 crew and passengers were last heard from on 27 July 1909. Its wreck has yet to be found.

This is a list of missing ships and wrecks. If it is known that the ship in question sank, then its wreck has not yet been located as of now.

Ships are usually declared lost and assumed wrecked after a period of disappearance. The disappearance of a ship usually implies all hands lost. Without witnesses or survivors, the mystery surrounding the fate of missing ships has inspired many items of nautical lores and the creation of paranormal zones such as the Bermuda Triangle. In many cases a probable cause has been deduced, such as a known storm or warfare, but it could not be confirmed without witnesses or sufficient documentation.

Many disappearances occurred before wireless telegraphy became available in navigation applications in the late 1890s, which would have allowed crew to send a distress call. Sudden disasters such as military strike, collision, rogue wave, or piracy could also prevent a crew from sending a distress call and reporting a location.

Among the many missing ships on the list are submarines, which have limited communication, and provide the crew almost no chance of survival if struck by disaster under water.

The advancement of radar technology by the end of World War II and today's Global Positioning System make it more likely that a distressed vessel will be located.

Most vessels currently listed as missing disappeared over a vast search area and/or deep water and there is little commercial interest in searching for the vessels and salvaging the wreck and its contents. Often the search and recovery costs are prohibitive even with today's sonar and wrecking technologies and could not be compensated by salvaged valuables, even if there were any on board. The search for these types of missing vessels is usually motivated by historical, legal or actuarial interests requiring the aid of government funding such as in the 2008 discovery of HMAS Sydney and Kormoran.

The list is organised by the marine region in which the disappearance or sinking occurred, or the closest country to the area. The year of the disappearance, last known location, and possible location of the wreck are included.

== Africa ==
Ship	Date	Possible or last known location
HMS Blenheim	1807	Off the coast of Madagascar
SS Waratah	1909	Somewhere between Durban and Cape Town

== North America ==
=== Canada ===
Ship	Date	Possible or last known location
USS Reprisal	1777	Somewhere off Newfoundland
SS Arctic	1854	Somewhere off Cape Race, Newfoundland (missing wreck)
SS Leafield	1913	Lake Superior, probably about 14 miles (23 km) southeast of Port Arthur, Ontario
Jutland	1920	Approximately 160 kilometers southeast of Halifax
Andrea Gail	1991	Somewhere off Sable Island
L'Acadien II	2008	Somewhere off Cape Breton (missing wreck)

=== Greenland ===
Ship	Date	Possible or last known location
Hans Hedtoft	1959	About 35 nautical miles (65 km) south of Cape Farewell

=== Panama ===
Ship	Date	Possible or last known location
Surcouf	1942	North of Cristóbal, Colón

=== United States of America ===
Ship	Date	Possible or last known location
Le Griffon	1679	Considered to be the first european-type ship to sail on the great lakes. Built by New France explorer René-Robert Cavelier de La Salle. Most likely lost somewhere on Lake Michigan (then known as Lac des Illinois) on the return trip of her maiden voyage in 1679
SS Hippocampus	1868	Lake freighter that capsized in Lake Michigan a few miles from Benton Harbor, Michigan
PS Alpena	1880	Lost on Lake Michigan 15 October 1880
SS W. H. Gilcher	1892	Somewhere in the Manitou Passage
SS Chicora	1895	Lake freighter that sank on 21 January 1895 in Lake Michigan
SS Lord Spencer	1895	Somewhere between San Francisco and New York City
SS Bannockburn	1902	Lost on Lake Superior 21 November 1902
SS Iosco	1905	Somewhere near the Huron Islands
SS D. M. Clemson	1908	Lake freighter vanished in a violent Lake Superior storm on 1 December 1908.
SS James Gayley	1912	Sank in a collision on Lake Superior on 7 August 1912, northwest of Caribou Island
SS Plymouth	1913	Near Gull Island and Poverty Island in Green Bay
SS Andaste	1929	Lost southwest of Holland, Michigan
SS Marine Sulphur Queen	1963	Somewhere in Florida Strait around 25°45′N 86°00′W (missing wreck)
SS Baychimo	1969	Ghost ship last sighted in the Beaufort Sea off Alaska
Bounty	2012	100 miles southeast of Cape Hatteras, North Carolina

=== Undetermined Area ===
Ship	Date	Possible or last known location
USS Albany	1854	Somewhere in Caribbean Sea
Cerisoles	1918	Minesweeper built for French Navy, lost in heavy weather in Lake Superior along with Inkerman in November 1918
USS Cyclops	1918	Somewhere between Barbados and Baltimore, Maryland
Danube	1892	Somewhere between Guadeloupe and New York City
Le Griffon	1679	Lost between Green Bay and the Niagara River
HMS Heureux	1800	Somewhere between the Caribbean and Halifax
Inkerman	1918	Minesweeper built for French Navy, lost in heavy weather in Lake Superior along with Cerisoles in November 1918
USS Insurgent	1800	Somewhere in Caribbean Sea
Java	1869	Disappeared en route to Yokohama
USS Lynx	1820	Somewhere between St. Mary's, Georgia and Kingston, Jamaica
Maratonga	2015	Somewhere between Norfolk, Virginia and Portugal
SS Marquette & Bessemer No. 2	1909	American or Canadian waters of Lake Erie
USS Nereus	1941	Somewhere around the Virgin Islands
USS Pickering	1800	Somewhere between Newcastle, Delaware and Guadeloupe
USS Proteus	1941	Somewhere in Caribbean Sea
SS R.G. Coburn	1871	Lake freighter lost in heavy weather in Lake Huron in October 1871
USS Saratoga	1781	Somewhere in Caribbean Sea
Governor Parr	1925	Somewhere in Caribbean Sea
Santa María	1492	Somewhere off Haiti

== South America ==
=== Suriname ===
Ship	Date	Possible or last known location
Leusden	1738	Somewhere off Maroni River

=== Falkland Islands ===
Ship	Date	Possible or last known location
ARA General Belgrano	1982	Somewhere around 55°24′S 61°32′W (missing wreck)

== Asia ==
=== India ===
Ship	Date	Possible or last known location
SS Vaitarna	1888	Somewhere off the coast of Saurashtra in Arabian Sea
MV Kairali	1979	Some miles away from Margao
HMS Namur	1749	Somewhere off Cuddalore

=== Indonesia ===
Ship	Date	Possible or last known location
U-196	1944	Somewhere south of Java near Sunda Strait
USS Capelin	1943	Somewhere near Sulawesi
HMS Lady Nelson	1825	Unconfirmed destruction at Aluta Island or Baba Island

=== Japan ===
Ship	Date	Possible or last known location
USS Kete	1945	Somewhere off Ryukyu Islands
USS Runner	1943	Somewhere off Japan
IJN Shinano	1944	Somewhere around 33°07′N 137°04′E
USS Swordfish	1945	Somewhere off Ryukyu Islands

=== Philippines ===
Ship	Date	Possible or last known location
USS Grayling	1943	Somewhere off Manila or in Lingayen Gulf

=== Undetermined Area ===
Ship	Date	Possible or last known location
USS Porpoise	1854	Somewhere off the coast of China or Taiwan
USS Snook	1945	Somewhere between South China Sea and Luzon Strait

== Europe ==
=== Greece ===
Ship	Date	Possible or last known location
HMS Sickle	1944	Probably sunk in Antikythera Channel
UB-3	1915	Lost in the Aegean Sea west of Izmir
SS Californian	1915	Somewhere off Cape Matapan

=== United Kingdom ===
Ship	Date	Possible or last known location
U-47	1941	Somewhere near the Rockall Banks around 60°N 19°W
HMS York	1703	About 16 nautical miles (19 km) east of Harwich
Royal Merchant	1641	Somewhere off Land's End
John of Sandwich	1566	Somewhere off Alderney

=== Undetermined Area ===
Ship	Date	Possible or last known location
U-22	1940	Somewhere in Skagerrak Strait
U-54	1940	Somewhere in North Sea
U-122	1940	Somewhere between North Sea and Bay of Biscay
U-240	1944	Somewhere in North Sea west of Norway
U-337	1943	Somewhere around 63°N 12°W
U-376	1943	Somewhere in Bay of Biscay
U-398	1945	Somewhere in North Sea
U-519	1943	Somewhere in Bay of Biscay
Cymric	1943	Last seen 24 February 1943 off Dublin en route to Lisbon vanished with crew of 11
U-703	1944	Somewhere in Norwegian Sea
Eurydice	1970	Somewhere in the Mediterranean Sea
Gibraltar	1867	Reportedly sunk in English Channel (missing wreck)
HMS Seahorse	1940	Somewhere in Heligoland Bight (missing wreck)
HMS Snapper	1941	Somewhere in Bay of Biscay
ORP Orzeł	1940	Somewhere in North Sea
Cinco Chagas	1594	Somewhere off Pico Island
Revenge	1591	Somewhere off Terceira (missing wreck)
Hanneke Vrome	1468	Somewhere off Raseborg
Anna Catharina	1735	Somewhere in the Scheldt estuary

== Oceania ==
=== Australia ===
Ship	Date	Possible or last known location
Aagtekerk	1726	Somewhere around the Houtman Abrolhos islands
Albion	?	Somewhere between Table Cape and Circular Head
Amelia J.	1920	Somewhere around the Furneaux Group
Amy Louise	1909	Somewhere between Pernambuco, Brazil and Sydney
Argo	1814	Somewhere off the coast
Awahou	1952	Somewhere between Sydney and Lord Howe Island
Awarau	1891	Somewhere off Macquarie Island
Celestia	1887	Somewhere between Russell, New Zealand and Hobart
Chris	1903	Somewhere between Hobart and Adventure Bay
SS Christina Fraser	1933	Somewhere between Gabo Island, last sighting, and Geelong
City of Hobart	1873	Somewhere between Hobart and Blackman's Bay
Despatch	1826	Somewhere off Cape Pillar
Douglas Mawson	1923	Somewhere between Cairns and Thursday Island
Elizabeth Radcliff	1850	
Fleetwing	1876	
Flying Duck	1876	Somewhere off Swan Island (unidentified/missing wreck)
Grecian Queen	1863	Somewhere between Newcastle and Melbourne (unidentified/missing wreck)
John	1806	Somewhere between King Island and Sydney
John Leslie Griffiths	1880	Somewhere around King Island
Jumna	1881	Somewhere between Hobart and Fremantle
Lady Franklin	1838	Somewhere between Sydney and Hobart
Louisa	1882	Somewhere around Fortescue Bay
Maid of Australia	1834	Somewhere between Port Arthur and Port Philip
Malcolm	1898	Somewhere between Wollongong and Sydney.
Morning Star	1814	Somewhere off Booby Island
Nft West	1989	Somewhere in Arafura Sea
Omega	1921	Somewhere between Hobart and Lyttelton, New Zealand
Peron	1948	Somewhere near Darwin
Phoenix	1950	Somewhere between Truscott and Darwin
Port Phillip Packet	1838	Somewhere between Launceston and Port Phillip Bay
Princess Charlotte	1820	Somewhere between Hobart and Sydney
Raven	1806	
Reindeer	1862	Somewhere around the Kent Group (missing wreck)
Resolution	1832	Somewhere between Launceston and Twofold Bay
HMS Sappho	1858	somewhere in Bass Strait
Senorita	1854	Somewhere between Sydney and Hobart
Southern Cross	1908	Somewhere around the Furneaux Group (unconfirmed wreck)
Unity	1813	Somewhere off the coast
Venus	1803	Somewhere between Sydney and southern New Zealand
Viscount McDuff	After 8 August 1882	Somewhere between Sydney and Madras (unidentified/missing wreck)
Vivid	1854	Somewhere between Melbourne and Circular Head, Tasmania
Whale	1816	Somewhere between Sydney and the mouth of the Hawkesbury River
Yarra Yarra	1838	Somewhere between Launceston and Port Phillip Bay

=== Northern Mariana Islands ===
Ship	Date	Possible or last known location
USS Gudgeon	1944	Near Maug Islands, or unconfirmed sinking southeast of Iwo Jima at 22°52′N 143°32′W (missing wreck)

=== New Zealand ===
Ship	Date	Possible or last known location
General Grant	1866	Off western shore of Auckland Island (missing wreck)

=== Papua New Guinea ===
Ship	Date	Possible or last known location
USS Amberjack	1943	Probably sunk off Rabaul (missing wreck)

=== Solomon Islands ===
Ship	Date	Possible or last known location
USS Grampus	1943	Probably sunk in Blackett Strait (missing wreck)

=== Undetermined area ===
Ship	Date	Possible or last known location
Independence	1805	Somewhere between Sydney and the Antipodes Islands, south east of New Zealand
Active	1810	Tasman Sea

== High seas ==
The following lists contain entries that could not be referenced to an area close to any one particular country or an area definitely in international waters.

=== Antarctic Ocean ===
Ship	Date	Possible or last known location
HMS Jonquil	1955	

=== Arctic Ocean ===
Ship	Date	Possible or last known location
U-355	1944	

=== Atlantic Ocean ===
Ship	Date	Possible or last known location
U-116	1942	Somewhere around 45°00′N 31°30′W
U-184	1942	Somewhere east of Newfoundland near 49°N 45°W
U-192	1943	Somewhere southeast of Cape Farewell, Greenland around 53°06′N 45°02′W (missing wreck)
U-338	1943	Somewhere around 57°N 30°W
Tristan da Cunha lifeboat	1885	Somewhere around Tristan da Cunha
U-381	1943	Somewhere south of Greenland
U-420	1943	
U-529	1943	
U-553	1943	
U-1226	1944	
Africa	1883	Somewhere between New York City and Leith
America	1882	Somewhere between New York City and Hamburg
Apollo	1894	Somewhere between New York City and Antwerp
HMS Atalanta	1880	Somewhere between Bermuda and England
SS City of Boston	1870	Somewhere between New York City and Liverpool
SS City of Glasgow	1854	Somewhere between Liverpool and Philadelphia
SS Falls of Bracklinn	1897	Somewhere between Baltimore and Avonmouth
City of Limerick	1882	Somewhere between New York City and London
City of London	1881	Somewhere between London and New York City
Colombo	1876	Somewhere between Hull and New York City
USS Cyclops	1918	Somewhere in the Bermuda Triangle
USS Epervier	1815	
Erin	1889	Somewhere between New York City and London
Hans Hedtoft	1959	Somewhere south of Cape Farewell, Greenland
Henry Edye	1881	Somewhere between Antwerp and New York City
Hermann Ludwig	1878	Somewhere between New York City and Antwerp
Humber	1885	Somewhere between New York City and London
Huronian	1902	Somewhere between Glasgow and Saint John, New Brunswick
SS Ismailia	1873	Somewhere between New York City and Glasgow
FV Johannes Krüss	1967	Somewhere west of Cape Farewell, Greenland
København	1928–1929	Somewhere between Buenos Aires and Australia
Ludwig	1883	Somewhere between Antwerp and Montreal
Lyubov Orlova	2013	Last sighted around 49°22.70′N 44°51.34′W
Madagascar	1853	Somewhere between Port Phillip and London (also listed under Indian Ocean)
Mercator	1880	Somewhere between Antwerp and New York City
Merrimac	1899	Somewhere between Quebec City and Belfast
Moy	1905	Somewhere between British Guiana and Liverpool
MS München	1978	Somewhere around 44°N 24°W (missing wreck)
SS Naronic	1893	Somewhere between Point Lynas, Wales and New York City
Neustria	1908	Somewhere between New York City and Marseille
Neva	1887	Somewhere between Banyuwangi and Lisbon (also listed under Indian Ocean)
Pacific	1856	Somewhere between Liverpool and New York City
Pauillac	1900	Somewhere between Glasgow and Saint John, New Brunswick
SS President	1841	Somewhere between New York City and Liverpool
De Ruyter	1894	Somewhere between Antwerp and New York City
Shannon	1872	Somewhere between Montreal and Liverpool
Shannon	1885	Somewhere between London and Calcutta (also listed under Indian Ocean)
Spray	1909	Somewhere between Vineyard Haven, United States and Venezuela
Tempest	1857	Somewhere between New York City and Glasgow
Titania	1882	Somewhere between New York City and Newcastle
Trojan	1874	Somewhere between Glasgow and Halifax
United Kingdom	1869	Somewhere between New York City and Glasgow
Vorsetzen	1885	Somewhere between Halifax and Antwerp

=== Indian Ocean ===
Ship	Date	Possible or last known location
Burmah	1859/60	Somewhere between London and New Zealand (last seen near 97E 48S)
HMS Stonehenge	1944	Somewhere in Bay of Bengal or Andaman Sea
MV Kairali	1979	Somewhere 500 km off Margoa, India

=== Tasman Sea ===
Ship	Date	Possible or last known location
SS Canastota	1921	Somewhere between Sydney and Wellington

=== Pacific Ocean ===
Ship	Date	Possible or last known location
Amelia	1816	Somewhere between Sydney and Java
SY Aurora	1918	Somewhere between Newcastle, Australia and Iquique, Chile
Endeavour	1914	Somewhere between Macquarie Island and Hobart
USS Hammann	1942	Somewhere north of Midway Island
HMCS Integrity	1805	Somewhere between Sydney, Australia and Valparaíso, Chile
Kakanui	1891	Somewhere between Macquarie Island and New Zealand
USS Kete	1945	Somewhere between Colnett Strait (Tokara Kaikyo) and Midway Island
Lyman D. Foster	1919	Somewhere between Nuku'alofa and San Francisco

== See also ==
- List of missing aircraft
- Lists of shipwrecks
- List of unrecovered and unusable flight recorders
- List of ghost ships
- Lists of people who disappeared
