= FV Johannes Krüss =

German vessel that disappeared off Greenland in 1967

- Johannes Krüss at sea

History

Germany
- Name: Johannes Krüss
- Owner: Hochseefischerei Carl Kämpf Partenreederei
- Operator: Hochseefischerei Carl Kämpf Partenreederei
- Builder: Seebeckwerft
- Launched: 1956
- In service: 1956
- Identification: IMO: 5517295
- Fate: Disappeared 300 miles off Cape Farewell, Greenland, 21 February 1967

General characteristics
- Type: Fishing trawler
- Tonnage: 659 GRT
- Length: 183.7 ft (56.0 m)
- Beam: 30.01 ft (9.15 m)
- Depth: 18.3 ft (5.6 m)
- Installed power: 1 × steam turbine, single shaft, 1 screw; 1,250 RHP
- Propulsion: 1 × screw propeller
- Speed: 13 knots
- Crew: 23

FV Johannes Krüss was a West German fishing trawler that was known for its rescue efforts during the sinking of Danish passenger liner MS Hans Hedtoft in 1959. On 21 February 1967, she went missing off Cape Farewell, Greenland. No survivors were ever found and her wreck remains missing.

== Construction ==
Johannes Krüss was built in the Seebeck-Werft shipyard in Bremerhaven, Germany in 1956. She was 56 meters long with a 9.13 meter beam. The ship was launched on 25 June 1956, owned by Hochseefischerei Carl Kämpf Partenreederei, a shipping company based in Bremerhaven.

== Career ==
Johannes Krüss was a fishing trawler, and was involved in fishing off the coast of Germany during her career.

=== Search for MS Hans Hedtoft survivors ===
On 30 January 1959, Johannes Krüss received distress calls from the sinking Danish passenger ship MS Hans Hedtoft at 13:56 near Cape Farewell, Greenland after the latter struck an iceberg at 59°30′N 43°00′W. She was one of three vessels that responded to the distress signals, the other two being United States Coast Guard cutter USCGC Campbell and another West German trawler. However, due to rough seas, floating ice, dwindling daylight and general poor visibility they were unable to reach the position provided by Hans Hedtoft before she sank later that afternoon. Johannes Krüss was the only of the three vessels to have made it to the position of Hans Hedtoft only a few minutes after her sinking, but was unable to find any survivors.

== Disappearance ==
On 21 February 1967, Johannes Krüss left Bremerhaven en route to North Atlantic fishing grounds with 23 people on board. Her last communication was on 28 February, when she reported that she was 300 miles east of Cape Farewell, Greenland, at 38°W. She was not heard from again. At the time, the temperature around the vessel's last known coordinates was -22°C, and wind speeds were up to 10 beaufort.

The trawler missed its regular catch report deadline on 5 March, at which point the ship's owners tried contacting her via Norddeich radio station and received no response. A second trawler, J. H. Wilhelms, broadcast a radio alert to all vessels in the area, asking, "Who has seen Johannes Krüss?" She also received no response.

On 9 March a search commenced for Johannes Krüss, run by Danish authorities in Nuuk. Multiple long-range search aircraft and several fishing trawlers including Jochen Homann, Seydisfjord, and Braunschweig, searched for her, but found nothing. No wreckage, lifeboats or bodies from Johannes Krüss were ever found. The search was called off on 21 March.

=== Aftermath ===
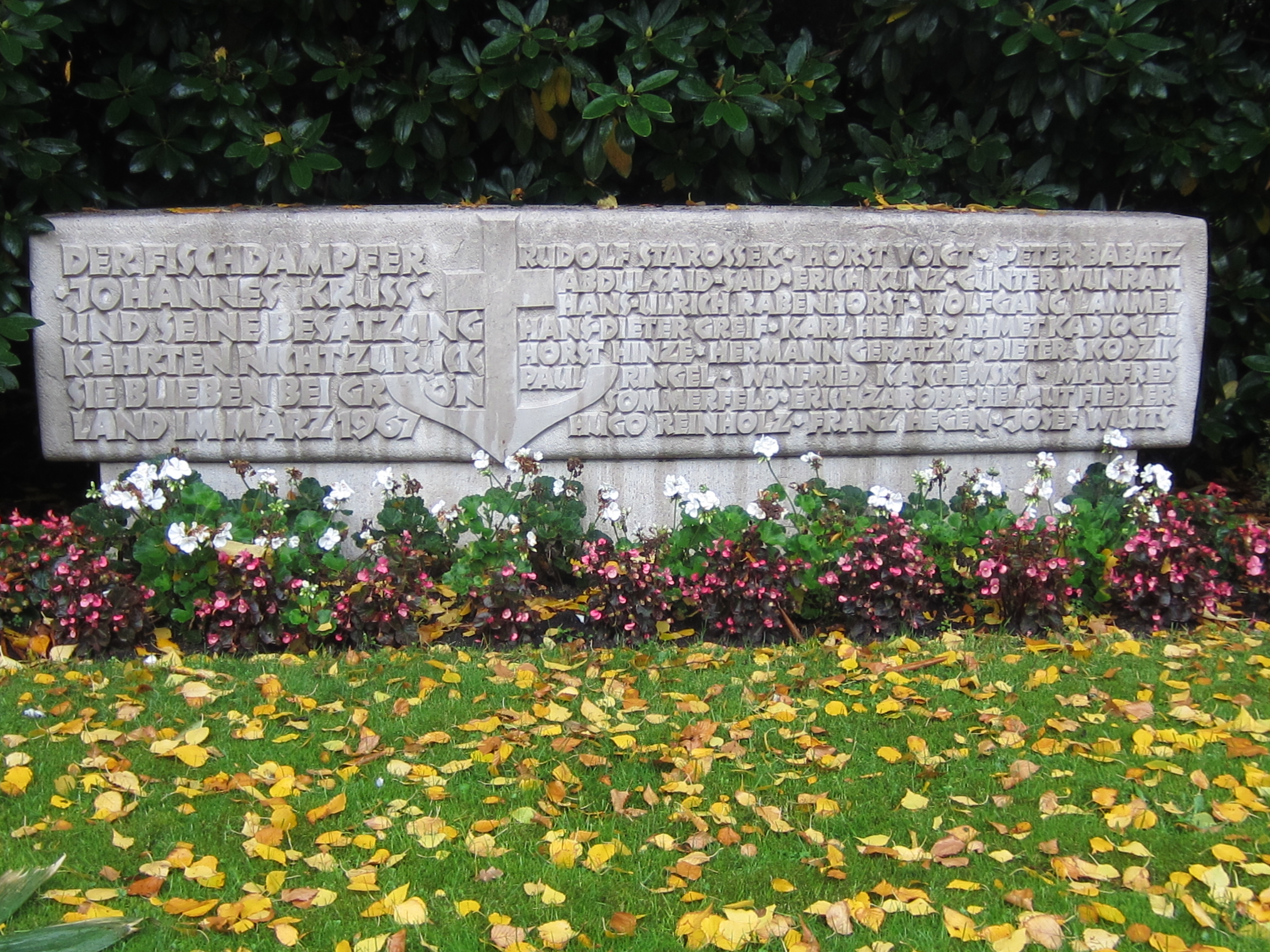
The memorial for Johannes Krüss in Bremerhaven cemetery

A memorial to the ship was built in Bremerhaven cemetery to honour the crew.

== See also ==
- MS Hans Hedtoft
- List of missing ships
