= Neustria (disambiguation) =

Neustria is a former territory of France.

Neustria may also refer to:

- Neustria (Italy), an early medieval geographical area in modern Italy
- Neustria (ship), a passenger ship of the French Fabre Line
