= 1951 Greenlandic Provincial Council election =

Provincial Council elections were held in Greenland for the first time on 29 June 1951, alongside district council elections. Voter turnout was 73%.

== Background ==
The Provincial Council was created after the Danish Parliament passed a law on 27 May 1950. It replaced two provincial councils covering the north and south of the island, which had been indirectly elected.

== Electoral system ==
All Danish citizens over the age of 23 who had lived on the island for at least six months were eligible to vote or run for election. Candidates required nomination from 5–10 supporters. The 13 members of the Provincial Council were elected in single-member constituencies

The election had to be re-run in two constituencies; in Upernavik icy conditions had prevented distribution of election materials, whilst a measles outbreak in Nanortalik meant that most voters were ill on election day.

== Results ==
Constituency	Winning candidate	Votes received	%	Total votes
Disko	Jens Olsen	124	20.60	602
Disko Bugt	Marius Sivertsen	141	26.76	527
Egedesminde	Frederik Lynge	149	36.08	413
Frederikshaab	Abel Kristiansen	176	32.96	534
Godthåb	Augo Lynge	567	78.97	718
Holsteinsborg	Knud Olsen	97	25.13	386
Julianehaab	Frederi Nielsen	184	43.50	423
Kangaatsiaq	Nikolai Rosing	239	63.56	376
Nanortalik	Jacob Nielsen	130	22.00	591
Narsaq	Gerhard Egede	207	75.55	274
Sukkertoppen	Peter Egede	210	37.37	562
Upernavik	Hendrik Olsen	147	35.85	410
Uummannaq	Peter Fleischer	123	22.40	549
Source: Arctic

== Aftermath ==
The Provincial Council met for the first time on 25 September 1951.
