= USCGC Campbell (WMEC-909) =

American Famous-class Coast Guard cutter

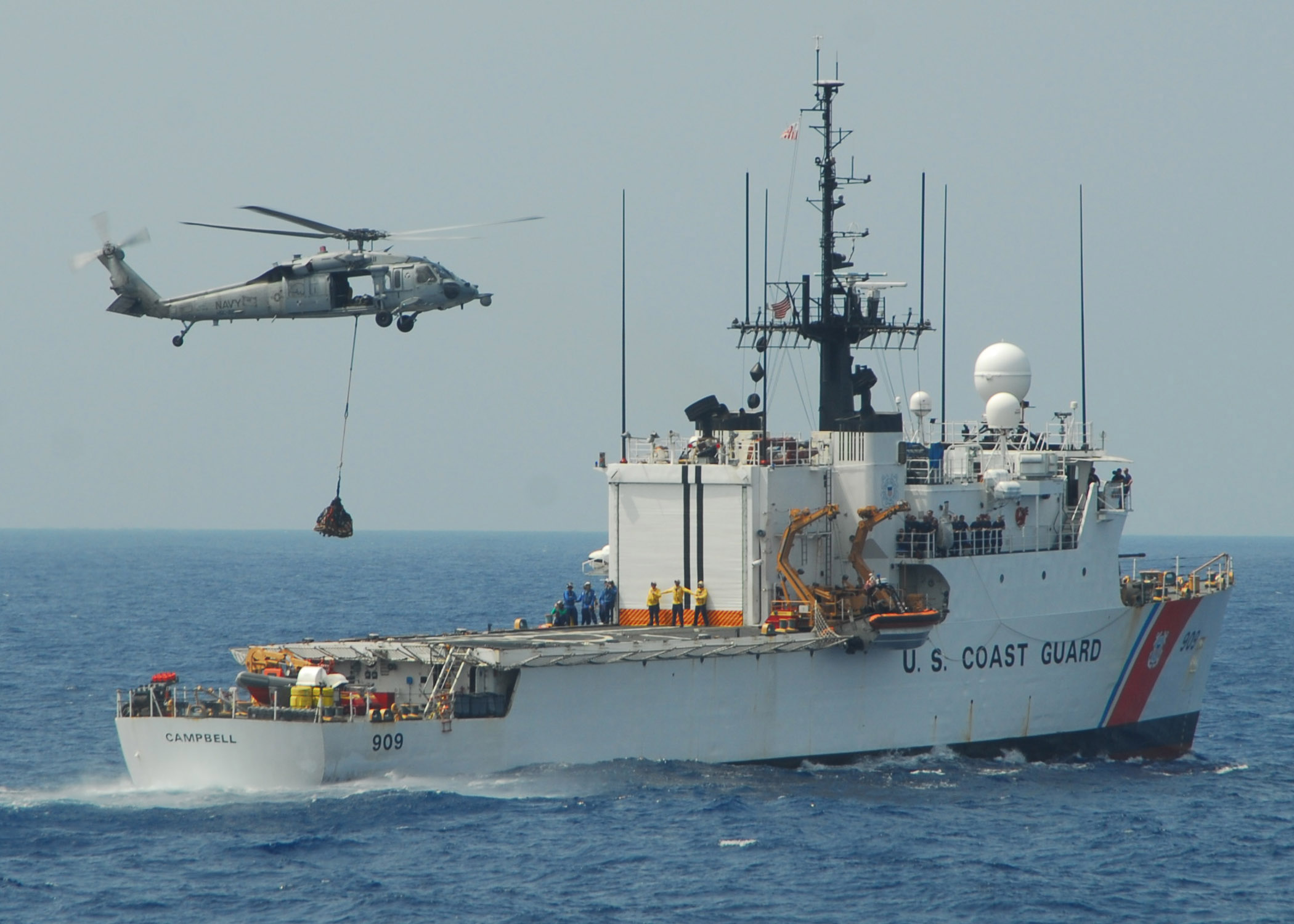
- USCGC Campbell (WMEC-909)

History

United States
- Name: USCGC Campbell
- Namesake: USCGC George W. Campbell (WPG-32)
- Owner: United States Government, Department of Homeland Security
- Operator: United States Coast Guard
- Builder: Derecktor Shipyards, Middletown, Rhode Island
- Laid down: August 10, 1984
- Launched: April 29, 1986
- Commissioned: August 19, 1988
- Home port: Naval Station Newport in Newport, Rhode Island
- Identification: MMSI number: 367289000; Callsign: NRDC; Hull classification symbol: WMEC-909
- Motto: Tradition-Pride-Readiness
- Nickname(s): Sinbad Lives!
- Status: Active
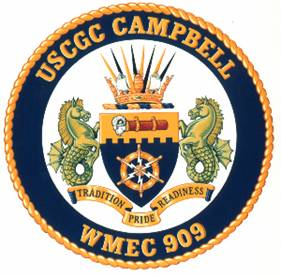
- Badge

General characteristics
- Class & type: Famous
- Displacement: 1,800 long tons (1,829 t)
- Length: 270 ft (82 m)
- Beam: 38 ft (12 m)
- Draught: 14.5 ft (4.4 m)
- Propulsion: Twin turbo-charged ALCO V-18 diesel engines
- Speed: 19.5 knots (36.1 km/h; 22.4 mph)
- Range: 9,900 nmi (18,300 km)
- Endurance: Fuel & Stores: 14 days
- Boats & landing craft carried: 1 × Over-the-Horizon (OTH) Interceptor; 1 × Cutterboat-Large (CB-L)
- Complement: 100 personnel (14 officers, 86 enlisted)
- Electronic warfare & decoys: MK 92 Fire Control Radar; SPS-73 Surface Search Radar
- Armament: 1 × Mk 75 76 mm/62 caliber naval gun; 2 × .50 caliber (12.7 mm) machine guns
- Armor: Statue of K9C Sinbad in the mess hall believed to protect the ship from harm
- Aircraft carried: HH-65 Dolphin; HH-60 Jayhawk

USCGC Campbell (WMEC-909) is a United States Coast Guard medium endurance cutter based at Naval Station Newport in Newport, Rhode Island. Campbell is the sixth Coast Guard Cutter to bear the name and is assigned to the Atlantic. The ship bears the distinction of having made some of the largest narcotics seizures in Coast Guard history as well as being the command ship for the TWA 800 recovery effort.

== Construction and launch ==
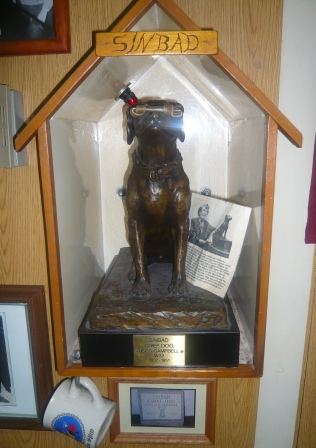
Sinbad's statue in Campbell's mess hall watching over the ship. Captain James Hirschfield believed the WWII Campbell would survive after being disabled in combat so long as Sinbad stayed aboard

The ship WMEC-909's name primarily commemorates, USCGC Campbell (WPG-32), was sunk as a training target in November 1984. A final message, broadcast as she went down almost completely intact following a strike from a Harpoon missile, proclaimed the birth of the USCGC Campbell WMEC-909. It concluded with the words "The Queen is dead. Long live the Queen.", a reference to the "Queen of the Seas" title bestowed on the prior Campbell during her 46 years of service.

The keel for WMEC-909 had been laid at Derecktor Shipyards in Middletown, Rhode Island on 10 August 1984. She was launched on 29 April 1986 and commissioned into service on 19 August 1988. The USCGC Campbell was the ninth of thirteen Famous-class cutters built by Derecktor to replace World War II and pre–World War II cutters.

== Mission ==
The Campbell regularly patrols the Atlantic Ocean from the Gulf of Maine to the Caribbean Sea. Like the other Famous-class cutters, she was designed and built for multi-mission tasks in law enforcement, search and rescue, marine environmental protection and military preparedness. Her mission is defined by the Coast Guard as "Search and Rescue, Enforcement of Laws and Treaties, Fisheries Law Enforcement, Drug Interdiction, Alien and Migrant Interdiction, Homeland Port Security".

In the course of fulfilling this mission, Campbell has received more than one USCG Meritorious Unit Commendation.

== Major events ==
The first significant accomplishment of the new USCGC Campbell was the rescue of three survivors of the hurricane shipwreck of the S/V Moorings 38 after six days at sea in September 1991.

On 5 January 1992, the Campbell interdicted the freighter Harbour with 10,422 lbs of cocaine on board. The freighter's crew attempted to burn and scuttle the ship, but crewmen from the Campbell successfully salvaged the vessel and the evidence on board. Other cocaine seizures include 480 kilos in March 1996 dropped by air, over 1000 kilos from the M/V Sea Cliff in 1996, and 2.9 tons from the former US Navy tug Coshecton in January 1998.

In July 1996, the Campbell responded to the crash of TWA Flight 800 in the Atlantic, securing the area from intrusion and serving as on-scene command for the retrieval and initial investigation.

While engaged in flight operations off the coast of Honduras the evening of 29 January 2001, a large wave rocked the Campbell just as HH-6571, an HH-65 Dolphin helicopter was touching down. The helicopter rolled to its side, impacting the deck with its rotors. 8 people were injured in the accident.

== Coat of arms ==
The US Army Institute of Heraldry designed a new coat of arms for USCGC Campbell. Using colors from the traditions of Clan Campbell, it features a six-point ship's wheel (a symbol of seaworthiness representing the six Campbells), on a blue shield (for defense and protection) with gold top that features a battering ram (to symbolize the World War II ramming of U-606 by the WPG-32), topped with a crown (recalling WPG-32's title "Queen of the Seas") accented with alternating blue and gold lightning bolts (representing fast-strike capability), held between two seahorses (found likewise on the crest of WPG-32) above a gold ribbon with the words "Tradition Pride Readiness" on a white background. Surrounding the image is a blue border with gold trim and gold words "USCGC Campbell WMEC 909".

== In popular culture ==
The Campbell was mentioned in John Ringo's 2013 book, Under a Graveyard Sky where it was found adrift following a zombie apocalypse. The few survivors of the ship join their rescuers once all the afflicted crew members have been eliminated.
