= MV Kairali =

Ship built in 1967

History
- Name: Oscarsord; Kairali
- Owner: Kerala Shipping Corporation
- Builder: Marinens Hovedverft, Horten, Norway
- Cost: 5.81 crores
- Launched: 5 September 1966
- Identification: IMO number: 6706412
- Fate: Disappeared without trace 500 km off Margao, July 1979
- Notes: Bulk Carrier

MV Kairali was a bulk carrier, owned by Kerala Shipping Corporation (KSC). She disappeared with her crew of 49 and 20,000 tonnes of iron ore on 3 July 1979 while sailing from Margao, India to Rostock, Germany, via Djibouti.

== History ==
The ship was initially built by Marinens Hovedverft in Norway and named as Oscarsord. The Kerala Shipping Corporation (KSC) purchased the ship for a sum of 5.81 crores (58,810,000 Indian rupees or USD 7,300,000 at the time) and renamed as Kairali.

== Last voyage ==
MV Kairali sailed from Margao on 30 June 1979. The ship was travelling to Rostock, Germany via Djibouti with 20,538 tonnes of iron ore. There were communications from and to the ship on 1st, 2nd, and 3 July 1979 through the Bombay Radio, the official agency to communicate messages to and from the ship. The last message received from the ship was on 3 July 1979 at 8:00 pm. On 11 July 1979 Mitcots, Kairali’s shipping agents in Djibouti, reported to KSC that the ship had not reported at Djibouti for fuelling on 8 July 1979 as per her schedule.

== Search efforts ==
There was a delay in the search effort, which started only on 16 July 1979. The Indian Navy was alerted and undertook reconnaissance flights in the area. After making several flights in the area from where Kairali had sent the last message, they gave up search operations. The inquiry conducted by the Indian Navy and Lloyd's of London declared Kairali missing some 500 miles off Margao.

== Probable causes of loss ==
The exact reason the ship went missing is still unknown. The following causes have been attributed by the relatives of crew members and people who worked in shipping industry

Liquification of cargo

Kairali was sailing with a cargo of iron ore in the month of July, which is a peak monsoon month. In all probability the vessel may have loaded cargo with high moisture content and possibly exceeding the Transportable Moisture Limit. This may have given rise to a condition were the cargo may have liquefied and eventually causing the vessel to capsize.

Excess cargo

As per a crew member who was working for Kairali, the ship which had a capacity of 19,000 tonnes, allegedly carried 20,500 tonnes of iron ore during the voyage in total disregard of safety norms. Also the mandatory process of balancing the cargo after it was loaded was not followed. This would have caused the cargo to shift in rough waves and eventually she could have sunk in high waves.

Faulty Radar

There is an allegation that the radar of the ship was under repair and Captain Mariyadas Joseph of MV Kairali refused to set sail on the morning of 3 July. But he was forced to commence the journey on the evening of the same day without repairing the radar.

Bad weather

Owing to bad weather and rough waves the ship may have broken into pieces and sunk in high seas.

Pirate attack

The ship may have been subject to a hijacking by pirates and the crew members taken to some uninhabited islands to fend for themselves, while the ship was taken to another location. As the ship was rumoured to have a faulty radar the pirates could not be detected before they attacked the vessel.

== Criticisms ==
Delay in search operations

There was a delay of about 12 days in starting the search operations. The delay was inexplicable given that the captain and headquarters exchanged a routine message every noon during the voyage.

Delay in releasing information to public domain

The ship's disappearance was publicly announced only after a Kerala Shipping Corporation agent in Djibouti contacted the company's headquarters in Kochi on 11 July, informing them of the ship's failure to arrive. The vessel was supposed to have docked in Djibouti on 8 July. The news appeared in the Kerala press only on 15 July.

== Compensation ==
The ship was insured, and an insurance claim of 6.40 crores was paid to the Kerala Shipping Corporation (KSC) by the insurance company.

== Aftermath ==
Various cases were filed in courts by relatives of missing crew members of the ship for tracing the ship. Also the Kerala Shipping Corporation was unable to provide the addresses of the crew members, FIR, Inquiry report as per the right to information requests. So in July 2014 the Kerala State Information Commission asked the state government to submit a report within 30 days on the loss of the Kairali, on the basis of complaints received.

== See also ==
- List of missing ships
