= Java (1849 ship) =

Ship that went missing in 1869

History
- Name: Java
- Namesake: Java
- Owner: A.A. Low & Brother
- Port of registry: United States
- Builder: George Raynes, Portsmouth, NH
- Laid down: 1848
- Launched: 1849
- Completed: 1849
- Maiden voyage: 1849
- In service: 1849–1869
- Status: Disappeared, 1869

General characteristics
- Type: Medium Clipper
- Tonnage: 538 tons
- Length: 135 ft (41 m)
- Beam: 30 ft (9.1 m)
- Draught: 18 ft (5.5 m)
- Propulsion: Full-rigged (three masts)
- Speed: 12–14 knots
- Capacity: General merchant cargo
- Crew: 18–25

Java was a 19th-century Boston-based clipper that disappeared without a trace while en route to Yokohama in 1869.

== History ==
Java was a clipper built in 1849 by George Raynes at his shipyard in Portsmouth, New Hampshire. Raynes had also built the clippers Witch of the Wave and Sea Serpent. Java was a three-masted full-rigged ship, and she was made primarily of white oak and yellow pine, weighing 538 tons.

Java was involved in the China Trade. She carried general cargo from New York or Boston to San Francisco, then sailing across the Pacific to Whampoa or Shanghai to load tea and silk. Java also completed a journey around Cape Horn in under 120 days.

== Disappearance ==
In 1869, Java was scheduled for a voyage from New York City to Yokohama, Japan. She departed New York in early 1869 and was expected to arrive in Yokohama by mid-summer. However, by late August 1869, there had been no sightings of, or communication from, the vessel. On 5 September 1869, she was officially reported missing by the New York Times. No wreckage or lifeboats were ever recovered, and her crew of 15-25 men all perished. The vessel was eventually written off as a total loss.

== See also ==
- List of missing ships
