= SS Pere Marquette 18 =

1902 Great Lakes train ferry

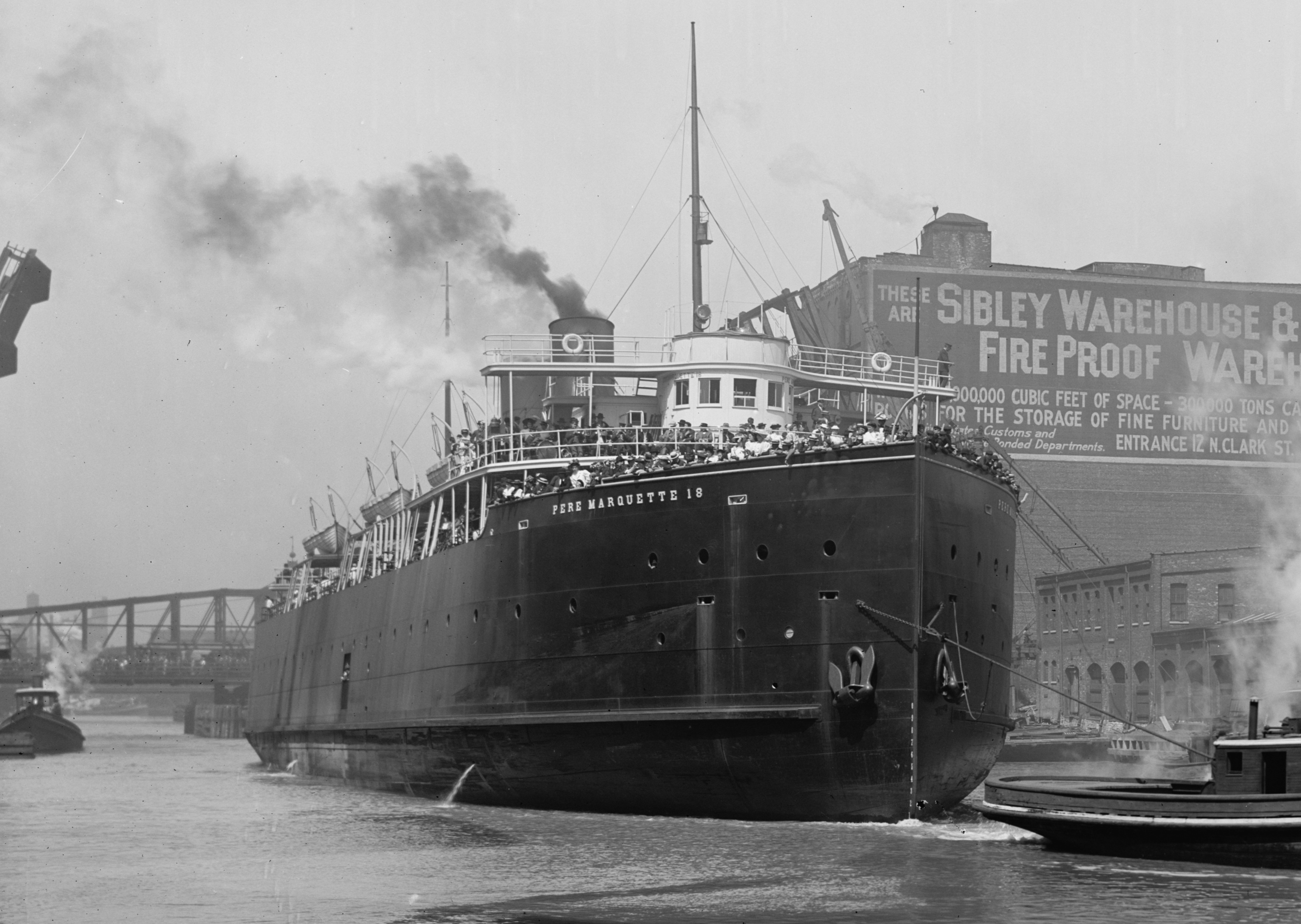
- Pere Marquette 18 passing under the State Street Bridge in Chicago while in tow of the tug T.T. Morford

History

United States
- Name: Pere Marquette 18
- Operator: Pere Marquette Railway Company
- Port of registry: Grand Haven, Michigan, U.S.
- Builder: American Ship Building Company
- Yard number: 412
- Launched: August 16, 1902
- In service: October 1, 1902
- Out of service: September 9, 1910
- Identification: US Registry #150972
- Fate: Flooded and sank on Lake Michigan with the loss of 29 lives
- Wreck discovered: July 23, 2020

General characteristics
- Type: Train ferry
- Tonnage: 2,909 GRT; 1,722 NRT
- Length: 350 feet (110 m) LOA; 338 feet (103 m) LBP
- Beam: 56 feet (17 m)
- Depth: 19.42 feet (5.92 m)
- Installed power: 6 × Scotch marine boilers
- Propulsion: 2 × 3,000 hp (2,200 kW) triple expansion steam engines
- Speed: 14 knots (26 km/h; 16 mph)

SS Pere Marquette 18 was a steel-hulled Great Lakes train ferry that served on Lake Michigan (primarily between the four ports of Ludington, Michigan and Kewaunee, Manitowoc and Milwaukee, Wisconsin) from her construction in 1902 to her sinking in 1910.

On September 9, 1910 while bound from Ludington for Milwaukee with 62 passengers and crew and 29 rail cars filled with general merchandise and coal, Pere Marquette 18 began taking on massive amounts of water. The pumps were turned on, but all attempts to save her were futile, and she sank off the coast of Sheboygan, Wisconsin. Her fleetmate, Pere Marquette 17 was nearby and managed to save 35 of her passengers and crew. Twenty-seven people on board Pere Marquette 18 were killed, while Pere Marquette 17 lost two of her own crew during the rescue. As none of her officers survived to recount what happened, the true cause of Pere Marquette 18's flooding remains a mystery.

The wreck of Pere Marquette 18 was discovered in July 2020 in about 500 feet (150 m) of water about 25 miles (40 km) east of Sheboygan by a wreck hunting team from Minnesota.

== History ==
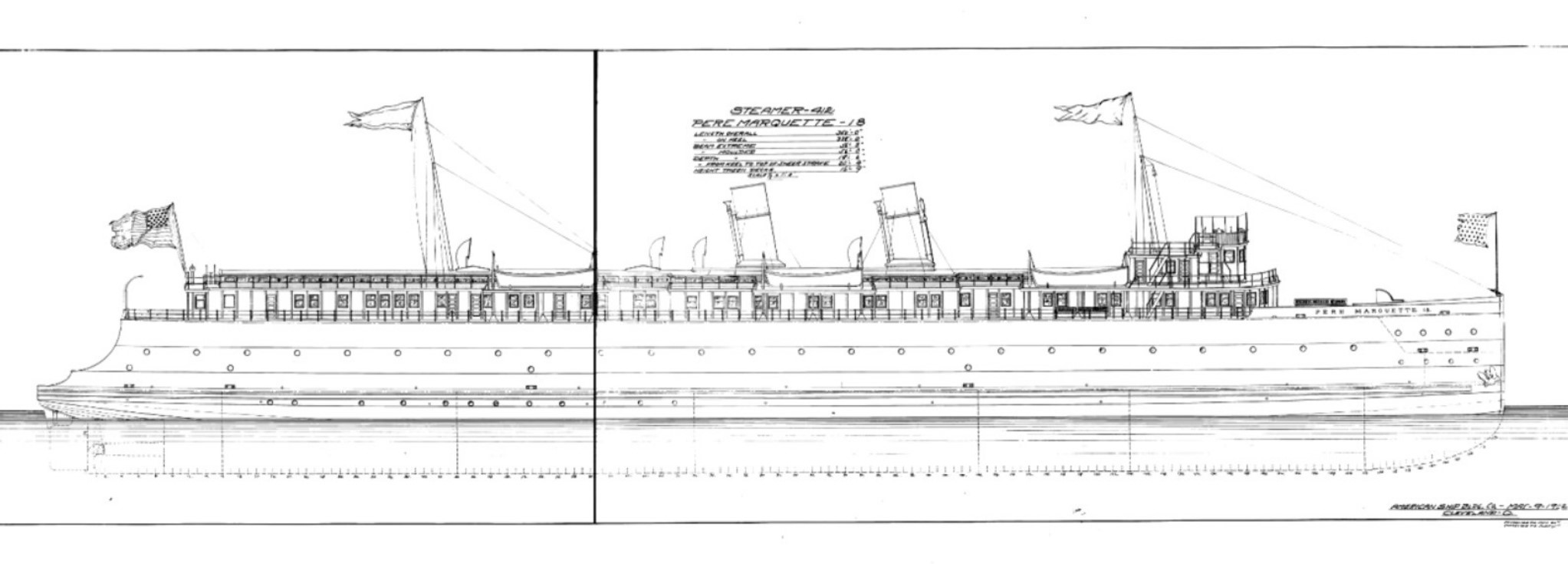
Blueprints of Pere Marquette 18

=== Design and construction ===
Pere Marquette 18 (Official number 150972) was designed by Robert Logan and was built in 1902 by the American Ship Building Company of Cleveland, Ohio. She was launched on August 16, 1902 as hull number 412 and was christened by Beatrice Logan, the designer's daughter.

Her steel hull had an overall length of 350 feet (106.68 m) (one source states 358 feet, 109.12 m), and a keel length of 338 feet (103 m). Her beam was 56 feet (17 m) (one source states 57.6 feet, 17.6 m) wide, and her hull was 19.42 feet (5.92 m) (some sources also state 19.5 feet, 5.9 m, 19.6 feet, 6.0 m, 20 feet, 6.1 m or 21.7 feet, 6.6 m) deep. She had a gross register tonnage of 2,909 tons, and a net register tonnage of 1,722 tons (other sources also state that she had a gross register tonnage of 2,777 tons and a net register tonnage of 1,660 tons, a gross register tonnage of 2,775 tons and a net register tonnage of 1,685 tons or a gross register tonnage of 2,443 tons).

She was equipped with two 3,000-horsepower (2,200 kW) (some sources state 2,500 hp, 1,900 kW) triple expansion steam engines which were powered by steam from six Scotch marine boilers. The boilers were 13 feet (4.0 m) in diameter and 12 feet (3.7 m) in length, each with a corrugated furnace with a diameter of 3.6 feet (1.1 m). The boilers each had a working pressure of 175 pounds per square inch (1,210 kPa). She was driven by two 12-foot (3.7 m) fixed pitch propellers, which propelled Pere Marquette 18 to a maximum speed of 13 or 14 knots (24 or 26 km/h; 15 or 16 mph).

Pere Marquette 18 had two decks and two masts. She had four railroad tracks on her main deck, which could accommodate up to 30 railroad cars. She contained 50 staterooms and several other rooms, providing sleeping accommodation for 250 people. When combined, the rooms and the decks enabled Pere Marquette 18 to carry up to 5000 people. She was equipped with electricity, which was operated at the pilothouse.

The total cost of Pere Marquette 18 was $400,000.

=== Service history ===
Pere Marquette 18 was built for the Pere Marquette Railway Company of Grand Haven, Michigan. The Pere Marquette Railway Company intended to use her for cross lake service on Lake Michigan, between the lake's western side (the ports of Kewaunee, Manitowoc and Milwaukee, Wisconsin) and the lake's eastern side (the port of Ludington, Michigan).

She received her first enrollment in Cleveland, Ohio on July 19, 1902; her initial home port was Saginaw, Michigan. She received her permanent enrollment in Port Huron, Michigan on March 6, 1903; Port Huron also became her home port. Sometime during her brief career, she received her final in Grand Haven. Her home port also changed multiple times during her career; one of these ports was Ludington, and her final home port was Grand Haven. Her call whistle was long-long-short.

On November 4, 1903 Pere Marquette 18 rescued the crew of six from the sinking schooner barge A.T. Bliss, which while bound from Sturgeon Bay, Wisconsin for Ludington broke loose from the tug Sidney Smith. In 1907, Pere Marquette 18 was chartered by the Chicago and South Haven Steamship Company of Chicago, Illinois for the Independence Day weekend. In 1909, Pere Marquette 18 was chartered by the Chicago and South Haven Steamship Company for service as an excursion steamer between. Her car deck was planked over, in order to host dancing and music. Several fruit machines were also installed. She spent the summers of 1909 and 1910 giving pleasure cruises between Chicago and Waukegan, Illinois.

A the end of her 1910 pleasure cruise season, Pere Marquette 18 was converted back to a train ferry. On September 8, 1910 after passing an official government inspection in Ludington, she rejoined the train ferry fleet.

=== Final voyage ===
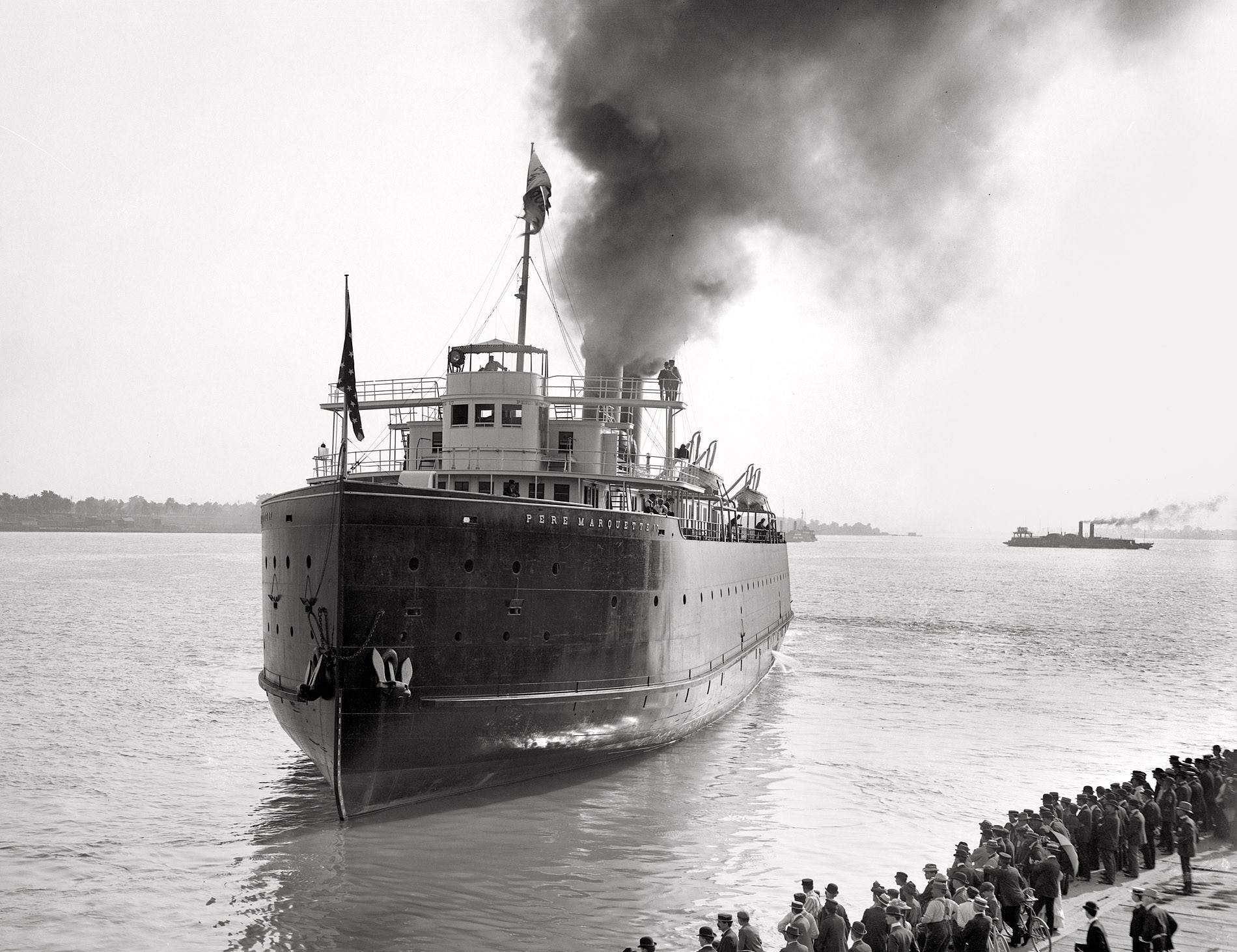
Pere Marquette 17

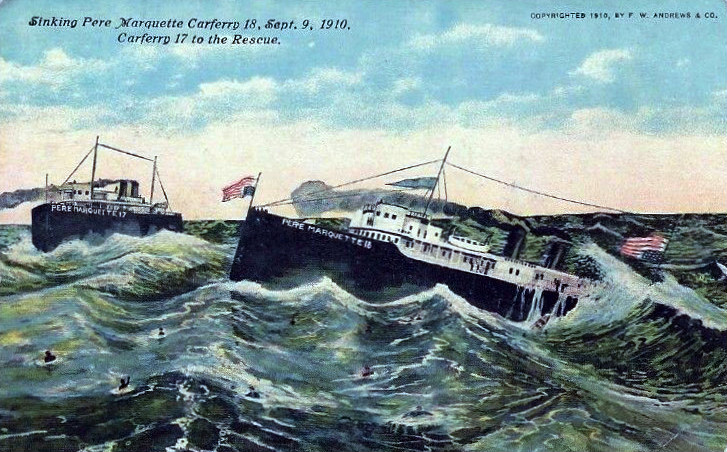
Pere Marquette 18 sinking with Pere Marquette 17 in the background

On September 8, 1910 at 11:30 P.M., Pere Marquette 18 left Ludington, Michigan under the command of Captain Peter Kilty with 62 passengers and crew (including Captain Kilty) and 29 rail cars filled with coal and miscellaneous freight on board. At around 3:00 A.M. (some sources state 4:30 A.M.) on September 9, while about halfway across Lake Michigan, the helmsman of Pere Marquette 18 began complaining that she wasn't steering properly. At about the same time, an oiler who went to oil the propeller shaft bearings reported to the bridge that there was approximately 7 feet (2.1 m) of water in her stern. The location of the initial flood was under the "flicker" (crew's quarters).

Captain Kilty ordered the pumps to be turned on, but they weren't able to keep her free of water; eventually, her stern had sunk so far that water began to seep in through the portholes. Captain Kilty eventually ordered that the course to be altered to Sheboygan, Wisconsin, and that 9 (some sources state 4 or 13) rail cars be jettisoned.

At around 5:00 A.M. by orders of Captain Kilty, purser and wireless operator Stephen F. Sczepanek (or Sczepanck) sent out the CQD: "Car ferry No.18 sinking - help!", which was repeated continually for nearly an hour. The radio operator on Pere Marquette 18's sister ship, Pere Marquette 17 picked up the call, and headed to rescue her. Pere Marquette 17 eventually reached Pere Marquette 18 and pulled alongside her to try and save the people on board. However, at approximately 7:30 A.M., Pere Marquette 18 suddenly sank stern first, with her bow rising high up into the air. As she sank, the air pressure that built up in her hull caused her to explode, which likely killed several people on board.

27 people on Pere Marquette 18 were killed. Pere Marquette 17 also lost two of her own crew, when the lifeboat they were in smashed against her hull. In addition to Pere Marquette 17, the ferry Pere Marquette 20 and the tug A.A.C. Tessley, which was towing the life saving crew also arrived at the scene.

==== Possible cause of sinking ====
The cause of Pere Marquette 18's sinking remains unknown. At the time of her sinking, it was speculated that during her time as a pleasure boat, she was treated roughly by the charter captains. It was said that she had been damaged by several hard dockings; she is also said to have hit several pilings, and due to the need for excursions they were not addressed. It was speculated that these incidents loosened several steel plates above the waterline, and as Pere Marquette 18 rode much lower in the water with rail cars than with passengers, the loosened hull plates would have been under water during her final voyage.

It was rumored that there were two stowaways on board, who may have contributed to the sinking by not securing their portholes. It was also suggested that during Pere Marquette 18's conversion back to a ferry, one of her seacocks was accidentally left open, causing water to flood in. A leaking propeller shaft was also suggested.

==== Aftermath ====
Pere Marquette 18's enrollment surrendered on September 15, 1910 in Grand Haven. After her sinking, she was valued at $400,000 and her cargo was valued at between $100,000 and $150,000. Captain Kilty's decision to try and save Pere Marquette 18 instead of abandoning her when he had the chance was criticized. An inspectors review published in the Marine Review specifically targeted Kilty in saying that:

We think that his efforts were directed more towards saving the ship, than to the saving of the lives aboard his boat.

The Pere Marquette Railway replaced Pere Marquette 18 with a new vessel which entered service in January 1911 – also called Pere Marquette 18.

In 1977, a memorial marker was erected in Ludington to commemorate the loss of Pere Marquette 18. The Marker reads:

At least twenty-nine persons died when this vessel sank in Lake Michigan twenty miles off the Wisconsin coast on September 9, 1910. One of the Ludington carferry fleet, the 350 foot S.S. Pere Marquette 18 was traveling from this port to Wisconsin. About midlake a crewman discovered the ship was taking on vast amounts of water. The captain set a direct course for Wisconsin and sent a distress signal by wireless. He and the crew battled for four hours to save the boat but she sank suddenly. All of the officers and many of the crew and passengers perished, among them the first wireless operator to die in active service on the Great Lakes. The S.S. Pere Marquette 17, aided by other ships who also heeded the wireless message for help, rescued more than thirty survivors but lost two of her own crew. The exact cause of this disaster remains a mystery.

The marker is located at 43°57′23.8″N 86°27′34.7″W.

== Wreck ==
S.S. Pere Marquette 18 Informational Designation
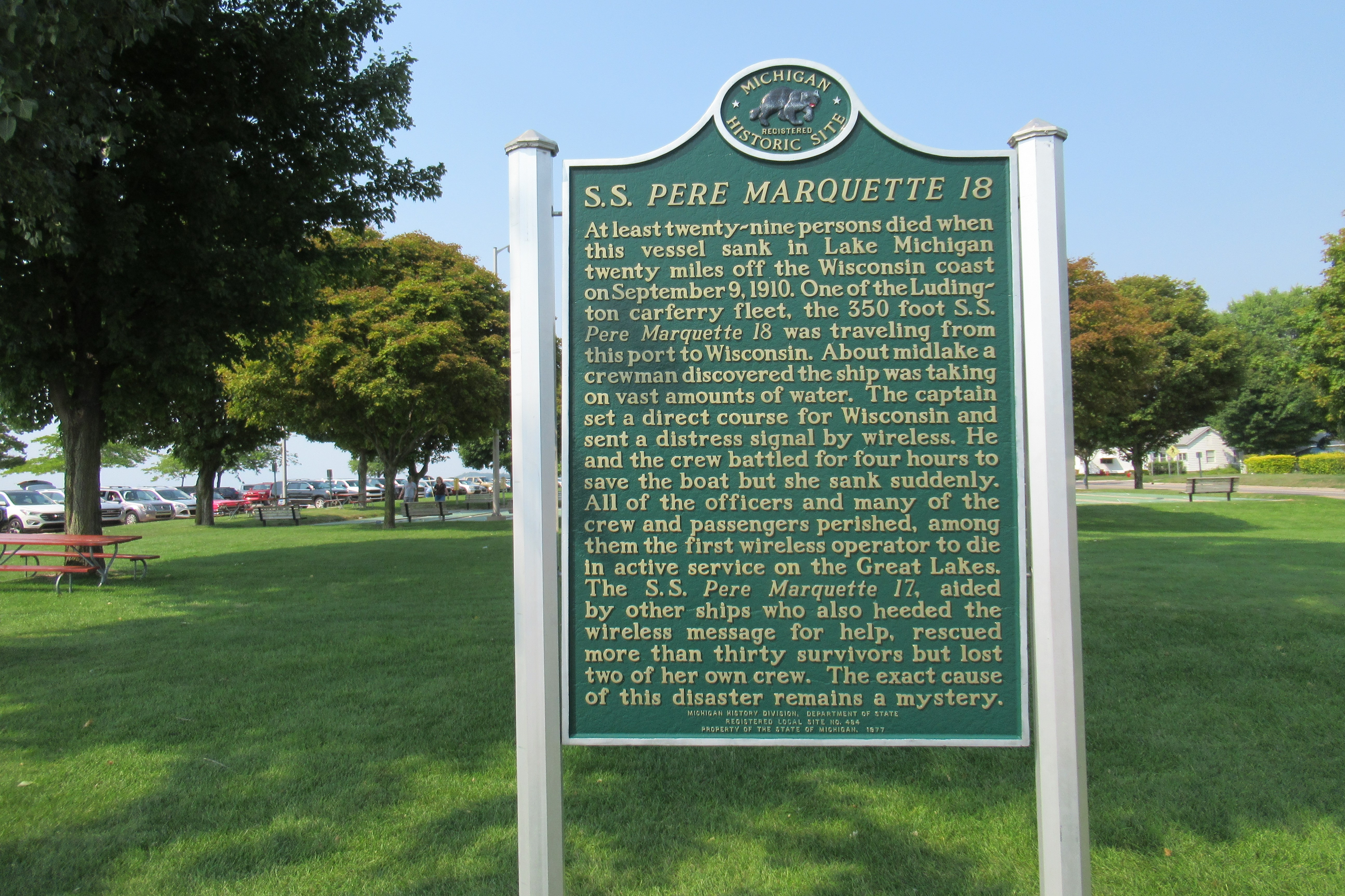
- Interactive map of S.S. Pere Marquette 18; Informational Designation
- 43°57′24″N 86°27′34″W
- Location: Stearns Park Beach along North Lakeshore Drive (M-116); Ludington, Michigan

Michigan State Historic Site
- Designated: December 14, 1976

=== Discovery ===
On July 23, 2020 wreck hunters Jerry Eliason of Cloquet, Minnesota and Ken Merryman of Fridley, Minnesota were searching for Pere Marquette 18 using a side-scan sonar and an archived account from the United States Life-Saving Service; they eventually located an anomaly in the middle of Lake Michigan, roughly 10 hours into their search. Eliason and Merryman were initially confused about the nature of the target, believing it to be a school of fish. The following day, Eliason and Merryman went back to the anomaly and dropped a camera attached to a 1,000 feet (300 m) cable down to it, discovering the bow of a ship rising off the lake bottom; they confirmed the wreck was Pere Marquette 18 based on a comparison of the davits of the wreck and the davits of Pere Marquette 18 in historical photographs.

Due to bad weather, it took Eliason and Merryman three weeks to return to the wreck, in order to capture footage of it.

The discovery of Pere Marquette 18 was made public in September 2020.

=== Today ===
The wreck of Pere Marquette 18 rests in about 500 feet (150 m) of water about 25 miles (40 km) off Sheboygan, Wisconsin. Her stern is completely buried in mud, with her bow rising 70 (21 m) to 100 feet (30 m) off the lake bottom at a 30° to 40° angle. Her decks have collapsed, and her pilothouse, which broke off and spun around when she sank, lies on her stern. One of her rail cars is also visible. A field of debris surrounds her wreck. Her wreck is completely covered in invasive zebra mussels. As her stern is completely buried in mud, it is unlikely that the cause of her sinking will ever be known.

Until her discovery, Pere Marquette 18 was the largest undiscovered shipwreck on Lake Michigan. (Note: As Pere Marquette 18 has been located, the steel hulled freighter W.H. Gilcher which sank with the loss of all hands on October 28, 1892 is now the largest unidentified shipwreck on Lake Michigan.)
