= Sinbad (dog) =

Mixed-breed dog in U.S. Coast Guard duty

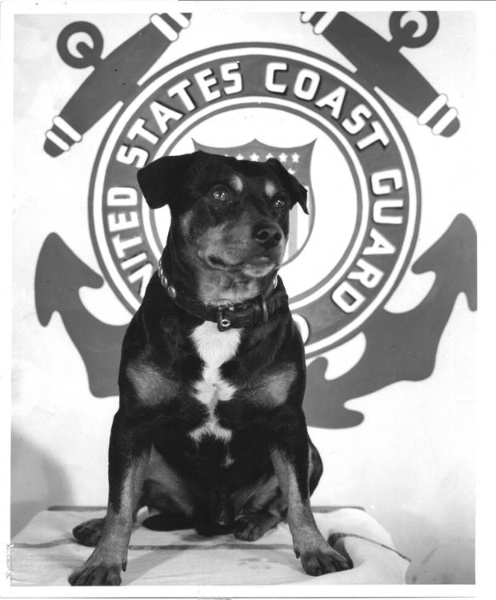
- K9C Sinbad, USCG (Ret.)
- Born: approx. 1937; New York
- Died: 30 December 1951 (aged 13–14); Barnegat Light Station, New Jersey
- Burial place: Barnegat Light Station Flagpole
- Military career
- Allegiance: United States
- Service years: 1937–1948
- Rank: Chief Dog
- Unit: USCGC Campbell (WPG-32)
- Conflicts: World War II

Sinbad (c. 1936 – 30 December 1951) was a mixed-breed dog that was one of two animals to be classified as non-commissioned officers by an arm of the United States military, rather than property, prior to the enactment of regulations to prohibit such (the other being Sergeant Stubby USA, WWI) after being enlisted by the creative crew of USCGC Campbell. Prior to and after an official retirement, Sinbad was assigned the title of Chief Dog (abbreviated K9C), his rank being that of Chief Petty Officer. At the time of the biography written by George Foley, no other member of the United States Coast Guard had yet been the subject of a published biography. Sinbad spent 11 years at sea on the Campbell including combat in World War II that became widely publicized as part of the homefront campaign.

== Coming aboard ==
Sinbad's birth is not recorded, but he was obtained by Chief Boatswain's Mate A. A. "Blackie" Rother of the USCGC George W. Campbell, who intended the dog as a gift for a girlfriend. She did not take him in due to a restriction against pets in her apartment building, leaving Rother with him as he returned from liberty in 1937. No crewman would take the dog, leaving him a stray without an owner, but most wanted him to remain on board. To justify enlistment, thereby eliminating the need for a master, the crew said that Sinbad displayed the attributes of a sailor by drinking coffee, whiskey with beer chasers at port bars, having regular and general quarters duty stations, and generally demonstrating seamanship. According to the Coast Guard and several published articles, he was enlisted into the service with his pawprint on enlistment papers. As Foley notes, Sinbad was assigned his own service and Red Cross identification numbers, service record, and bunk. He was also recorded as a member of the Society of Polar Explorers. Being prone to the indiscretions of both a canine and a sailor, Sinbad was subject to Captains Mast on two occasions, and was promoted and demoted in rank on several occasions. Sinbad ended his time at sea with the rank K9C Chief Dog and commensurate pay rate.

== Presence in combat ==
Sinbad was aboard Campbell throughout World War II while the cutter was assigned to convoy escort duty in the Atlantic. Although publicity photos depicted Sinbad standing helmeted on the barrel of a large gun, he actually stayed below decks with a general quarters duty post "assigned to damage control", keeping him away from the sound of gunfire.

Campbell's most significant action involved combat with, and sinking by ramming of, the German submarine U-606. After the cutter suffered severe damage, becoming disabled and without power due to flooding, "essential crew" were left aboard the otherwise evacuated ship to keep it afloat as it was towed to Canada for repair, and Sinbad travelled with them. Crew members later stated to the media that Captain James Hirschfield believed that nothing could befall the ship if Sinbad remained aboard. A statue of Sinbad is on the mess deck of current "Famous-class" medium endurance cutter USCGC Campbell (WMEC-909), successor to the preceding Campbell.

Sinbad was aboard during other anti-submarine warfare and strafing attacks by enemy aircraft.

While less decorated than the ship on which he was present during the war, Sinbad was awarded the following service ribbons: American Defense Service Medal, American Campaign Medal, European-African-MiddleEastern Campaign Medal, Asiatic-Pacific Campaign Medal, World War II Victory Medal and Navy Occupation Service Medal, which were attached to Sinbad's collar.

== Public relations ==
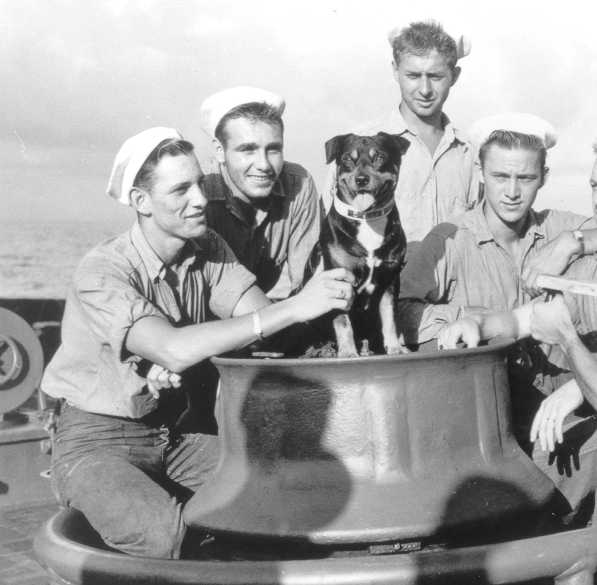
Sinbad and crewmates, 1943.

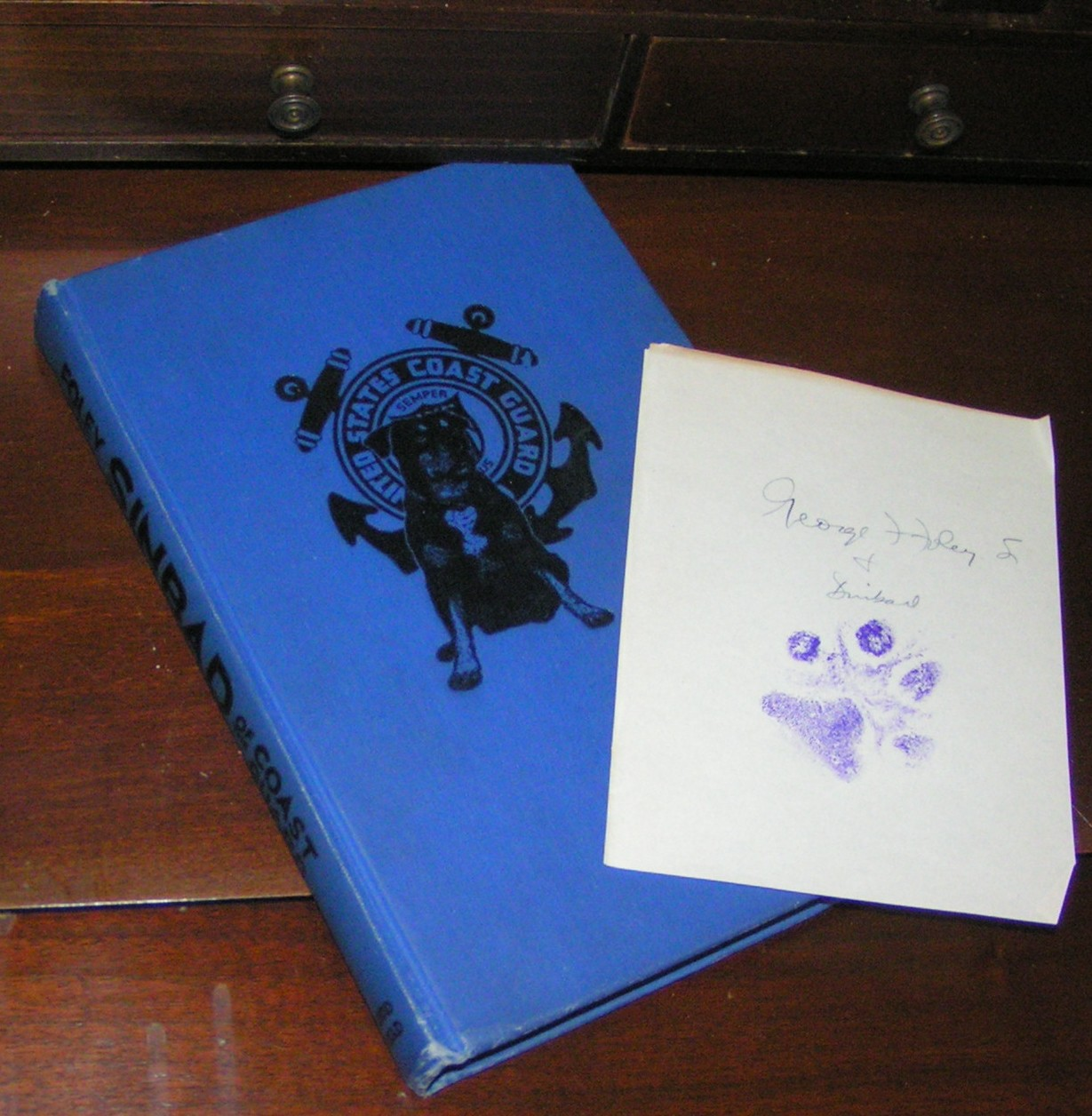
Autographed copy of George Foley's Sinbad of the Coast Guard from the book signing tour.

Sinbad became a public figure through media attention first accumulated through his presence in bars in ports of call. He also frequented Red Cross facilities such as his alleged favorite in Londonderry, where he was also the guest of honor at a dinner in Guild Hall.

New York newspapers featured the story of the clash with U-606, though without photographs as Sinbad was sequestered below after a night on the town. The Boston Globe's Martin Sheridan described him as "liberty-rum-chow-hound, with a bit of bulldog, doberman pinscher, and what-not." The “mostly what-not" appealed to blue collar and farm town America. Life magazine featured photo-stories about Sinbad twice during World War II. The first, written by Richard Wilcox, appeared in the July 19, 1943 issue. The second appeared in the Dec. 10, 1945 issue and covered Sinbad's “tour” of Tokyo while on shore leave, following the allied victory over Japan.

Photo sessions and network news interviews when the Campbell was in port served the home-front morale effort and gave Sinbad nationwide recognition. His celebrity further increased following the end of the war and the publication of George F. Foley's Sinbad of the Coast Guard, whose book-signing tour Sinbad accompanied.

As both a dog and sailor, Sinbad was not immune to causing trouble in port towns where the crew went on liberty, and was not always cooperative at public relations events. He was the subject of formal complaints called "diplomatic incidents" in Casablanca and Greenland.

== Retirement ==
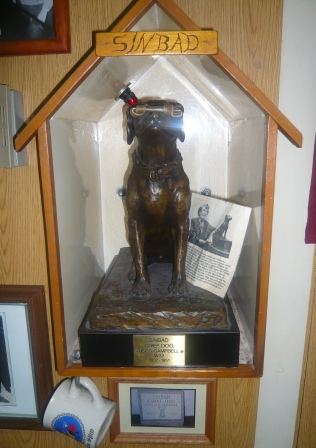
Statue of Sinbad on the mess deck of the USCGC Campbell (WMEC-909).

After spending 11 years with the Campbell's crew, mostly at sea, Sinbad was taken ashore at the Barnegat Light station in New Jersey, and listed as honorably discharged from the Coast Guard on 21 September 1948, and on "inactive duty". Once described by Life magazine as "an old sea dog [who] has favorite bars and plenty of girls in every port", Sinbad lived another three years quietly ashore, frequenting Kubel's bar on Seventh (the only bar) in Barnegat Light and looking out to sea from the station.

Sinbad was also long known for playing with a metal washer that he balanced on his nose, tossed in the air, and caught. A statue of Sinbad is on the mess deck of current "Famous-class" medium endurance cutter USCGC Campbell (WMEC-909), successor to the preceding Campbell. Lacking any oversized washers, or a large engine room crew Foley dubbed "the black gang" in reference to the soot and oil of their jobs to provide one, the statue instead balances a rawhide bone. The public affairs officer for Campbell, Ensign John Jeffares, wrote in 2011 in reference to their statue deemed in part to protect the ship vis-à-vis the belief attributed to Captain Hirschfield that "here on board we have our own special tradition. Sinbad's statue as well as his bone (as seen pictured on his nose) is considered off limits. Any personnel other than chief petty officers (Sinbad's rank while he was a crewmember onboard) who touch the statue and his bone are said to be stricken with bad luck... you just don't touch it."

Sinbad died on 30 December 1951 and was buried beneath a granite monument at the base of the light station's flagpole. The decommissioned station has since become the emergency operations center for the Borough of Barnegat Light, New Jersey.

== See also ==
- List of individual dogs
- Sergeant Stubby, a WWI United States Army dog with the rank of Sergeant (E-5), the only other dog besides Sinbad who was classified as a non-commissioned officer by an arm of the United States military
