= FV Jutland =

Canadian beam trawler

History

Canada
- Name: "Jutland"
- Owner: LaHave Fishing Company
- Port of registry: LaHave, Nova Scotia
- Builder: Boehner Bros.
- Launched: 1918
- Fate: Missing as of March 10, 1920

General characteristics
- Tonnage: 136 tons
- Length: 135 ft (41 m)
- Sail plan: Beam trawler

Jutland was a Canadian beam trawler based in Liverpool, Nova Scotia. Built in 1918 by the Boehner Bros., she was owned by LaHave Fishing Company.

== Disappearance ==
On March 10, 1920, Jutland left Halifax, Nova Scotia, with a crew of 21 heading to the Western Bank fishing grounds. On the morning of March 11, the Halifax steam trawler Lemberg discovered two dories approximately 160 kilometers (86 nautical miles) southeast of Halifax. Both dories were damaged and full of water. The body of John R. Ellison, a mate of Jutland, was discovered aboard one of the dories. The bodies of the 20 other crew members were never found. Various theories on what happened to Jutland have been examined, from an explosion to a collision.
