= USCGC Campbell (WPG-32) =

United States Coast Guard cutter

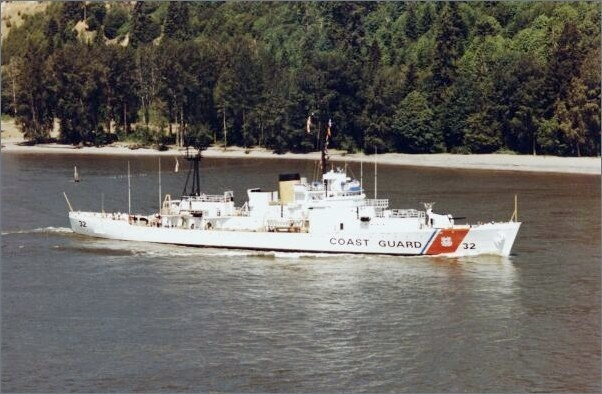
- USCGC Campbell (WPG-32) in final configuration

History

United States
- Name: USCGC George W. Campbell (1936–37); USCGC Campbell (1937–84)
- Namesake: George Washington Campbell
- Builder: Philadelphia Naval Shipyard
- Laid down: 1 May 1935
- Launched: 3 June 1936
- Commissioned: 16 June 1936
- Decommissioned: 1 April 1982
- Refit: 1941, 1943, 1945, 1946, 1966
- Identification: WPG-32
- Nickname(s): "Queen of the Seas"
- Fate: Sunk as target ship

General characteristics
- Class & type: Treasury-class cutter
- Displacement: 2,350 tons (original)
- Length: 327 ft (100 m)
- Beam: 41 ft (12 m)
- Propulsion: 2 × Babcock & Wilcox boilers; 2 × Westinghouse double-reduction geared steam turbine engines, 6,200 hp (4,623 kW)
- Speed: 21 knots (39 km/h; 24 mph)
- Range: 8,270 nmi (15,320 km; 9,520 mi)
- Complement: 125 to 225 (depending on time period)
- Armament: 1936: 2 × 5 in (127 mm)/51 caliber guns (2×1); 2 × 6-pounder guns; 1 × 1-pounder pom-pom gun; 1941: 3 × 5"/51 caliber (3×1); 3 × 3"/50 caliber guns (3×1); 4 × M2 Browning .50 caliber machine guns; 2 × depth charge racks; 1 × "Y" gun depth charge projector.; 1943: 2 × 5"/51 caliber gun (2×1); 4 × 3"/50 caliber (4×1); 2 × 20 mm/80 caliber Oerlikons (2x1); 1 × Hedgehog; 2 × "K" gun depth charge projectors; 2 × depth charge racks.; 1945: 2 × 5"/38 caliber guns (2×1); 3 × 40 mm/60 caliber Bofors; 6 × 20 mm/80 caliber (6×1); 1946: 1 × 5"/38 caliber; 2 × 40 mm/60 caliber Bofors (1×2); 8 × 20 mm/80 Oerlikon (8×1); 1 × Hedgehog; 1966: 1 × 5"/38 caliber MK30 Mod75 (1×1); Mark 52 Mod 3 director; 1 × Mark 10 Mod 1 Hedgehog; 2 (P&S) × Mk 32 Mod 5 torpedo tubes, 4 × Mark 44 Mod 1 torpedoes; 2 × .50 cal. M2 Browning MG, 2 × MK-13 high altitude parachute flare mortars
- Aircraft carried: originally 1 Grumman JF Duck seaplane (later removed)

USCGC Campbell (WPG-32) was a 327-foot (100 m) Secretary-class (also known as Treasury-class) United States Coast Guard ship built at the Philadelphia Navy Yard in 1935-1936 and commissioned in 1936. Seven similar "combat cutters" were built and named for secretaries of the United States Treasury.

Campbell was named for George Washington Campbell. She earned the title "Queen of the Seas" during a 46-year career, spanning World War II, the Korean War, and Vietnam War.

== Launch and early service ==
George W. Campbell was launched on 3 June 1936 and sailed to her homeport of Stapleton, New York, under the command of Commander E.G. Rose, USCG, assigned to conduct search and rescue and law enforcement patrols. She left New York on 22 October 1936 for her shakedown cruise to Southampton, England, returning to New York on 16 November. Her peace-time armament consisted of two 5-inch (127 mm) 51 caliber and two 6-pounder (3 kg) signal guns, all mounted forward. Unlike the other Secretary-class cutters, George W. Campbell and Ingham did not continue to carry aircraft, though they had originally been equipped to do so.

In August 1937, her official name was shortened to Campbell and it was also during this time that her mascot Sinbad reported aboard. Sinbad remained aboard Campbell throughout her tour of duty during World War II, caused at least two international incidents in foreign harbors, faithfully manned his battle station during combat, and generally kept the crew amused during her long voyages over eleven years; Sinbad died on 30 December 1951, after many years of service, and was the first and one of the few Coast Guardsmen to have a published biography.

== Wartime duties ==
On 5 September 1939, President Franklin D. Roosevelt proclaimed American neutrality in the conflict and ordered the formation of a neutrality patrol by the Navy to report and track any belligerent air, surface, or submarine activity in the waters off the East Coast and in the West Indies. The United States Navy determined that its destroyers were not capable of extended cruises in the North Atlantic and asked that the Coast Guard conduct these patrols. The Coast Guard assigned Campbell to conduct the first Coast Guard neutrality patrol, which were referred to as "Grand Banks Patrols." Campbell would perform five such cruises, each lasting approximately two weeks, the last such cruise returning to New York on 29 January 1940.

When prepared for convoy escort duty prior to her sailing for Portugal, workers at the New York Navy Yard added three 3-inch (76 mm) 51 caliber guns in-line, aft. Her two signal guns that were directly forward of the bridge were replaced with a single 3-inch 50 caliber gun. Her two 5-inch 51 caliber main batteries remained unchanged. Campbell was the first Secretary-class cutter to transfer for duty with the Navy (on 1 July 1941) and the first to sail on escort of convoy duties when she escorted Convoy HX 159 which sailed on 10 November 1941. Campbell's permanent station was changed from Stapleton to Boston in February 1942, and she later exchanged a 5-inch (127 mm) for a 3-inch (76 mm) gun, installed six more 20 mm guns, substituted two "K" guns for "Y" guns and had splinter protection built around three gun decks, bridge and wheel house.

Campbell, along with USCGC Spencer, were the first U.S. warships equipped with HF/DF, pioneered by the Royal Navy for the fight against the German U-boat fleet. The two cutters had been selected by the Navy to serve as test ships to gain experience with HF/DF, using British FH3 systems (carrying the U.S. designation Type DAR) installed in the American shipyard in Northern Ireland under the supervision of experts from the Admiralty Signals Establishment. As the Royal Navy had already discovered, HF/DF was an important part of combatting the threat posed to Allied convoys by U-boats, and the experience with the interim DAR equipment provided impetus to the U.S. development of its own Type DAQ system.

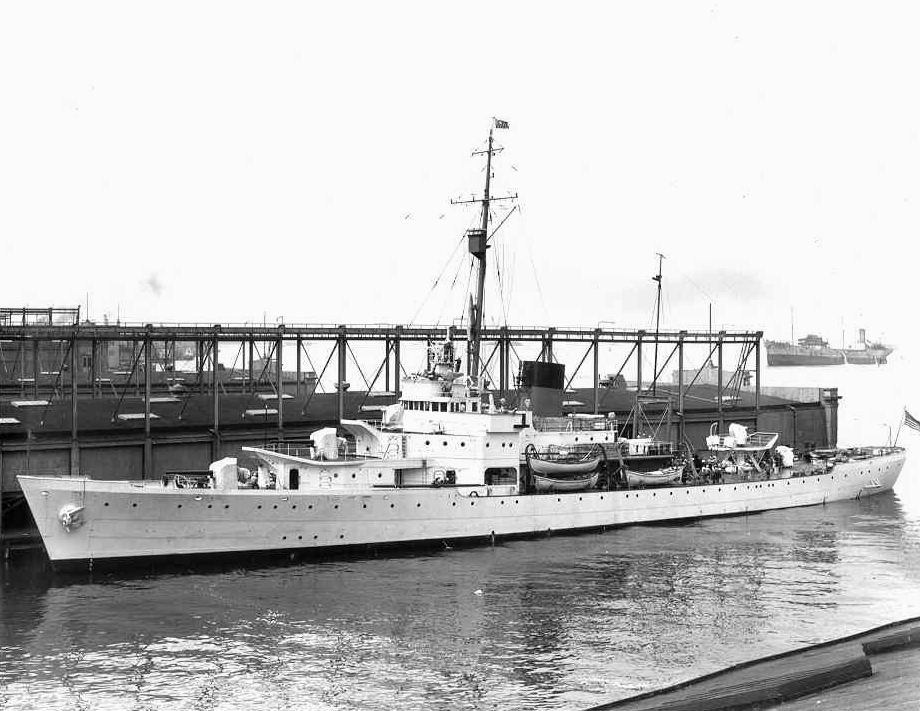
Campbell in the New York Navy Yard, 1940

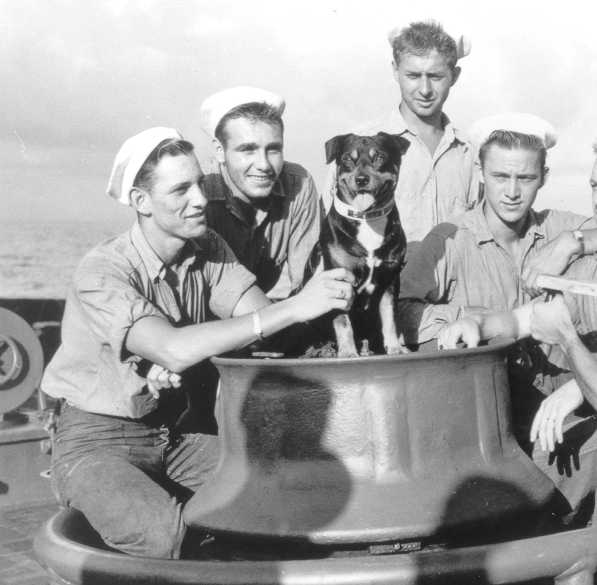
Sinbad and crew, 1943

=== Convoys escorted; 1941 – early 1943 (later convoys not listed) ===
| Convoy | Escort Group | Dates | Notes |
|---|---|---|---|
| ON 28 | | 31 Oct – 3 Nov 1941 | from Iceland to Newfoundland prior to US declaration of war |
| HX 159 | | 10––19 Nov 1941 | from Newfoundland to Iceland prior to US declaration of war |
| ON 39 | | 29 Nov – 4 Dec 1941 | from Iceland to Newfoundland prior to US declaration of war |
| HX 166 | | 25–31 Dec 1941 | from Newfoundland to Iceland |
| ON 53 | | 9–19 Jan 1942 | from Iceland to Newfoundland |
| HX 174 | MOEF group A3 | 9–17 Feb 1942 | from Newfoundland to Northern Ireland |
| ON 69 | MOEF group A3 | 25 Feb – 4 March 1942 | from Northern Ireland to Newfoundland |
| SC 76 | MOEF group A3 | 28 March – 11 April 1942 | from Newfoundland to Northern Ireland |
| HX 190 | MOEF group A3 | 20–27 May 1942 | from Newfoundland to Northern Ireland |
| ON 102 | MOEF group A3 | 10–21 June 1942 | from Northern Ireland to Newfoundland |
| HX 196 | MOEF group A3 | 2–10 July 1942 | from Newfoundland to Northern Ireland |
| ON 114 | MOEF group A3 | 20–30 July 1942 | from Northern Ireland to Newfoundland |
| SC 100 | MOEF group A3 | 16–27 Sept 1942 | from Newfoundland to Northern Ireland |
| ON 135 | MOEF group A3 | 3–14 Oct 1942 | from Northern Ireland to Newfoundland |
| HX 212 | MOEF group A3 | 23 Oct – 1 Nov 1942 | from Newfoundland to Northern Ireland |
| ON 145 | MOEF group A3 | 10–20 Nov 1942 | from Northern Ireland to Newfoundland |
| ON 156 | | 25–30 Dec 1942 | Iceland shuttle |
| HX 223 | MOEF group A3 | 19 – late Jan 1943 | from Newfoundland to Northern Ireland |
| ON 166 | MOEF group A3 | 12–22 Feb 1943 | from Northern Ireland to Newfoundland; convoy attacked (see below) |

When the British and Canadians assumed full responsibility for convoys in the North Atlantic in mid-1943, the U.S. took control of all mid-Atlantic and Mediterranean convoys, where the cutters faced a constant threat from U-boats and the Luftwaffe. Convoys were especially vulnerable once they cleared Gibraltar. Campbell sailed as an escort for Mediterranean convoys in 1943–1944 and saw considerable action against both U-boats and aircraft, with two incidents in particular of note.

=== U-boat attack, February 1943 ===
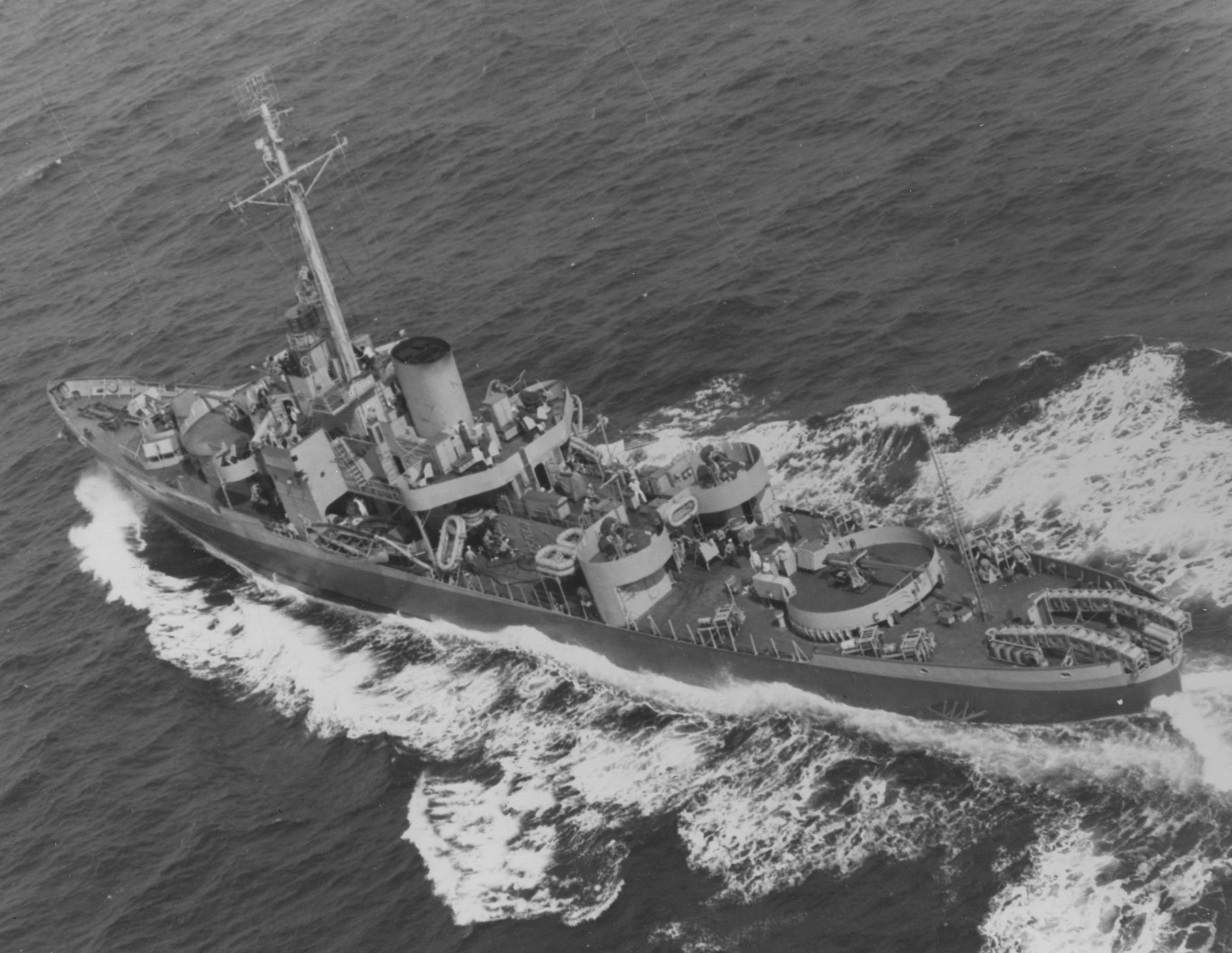
WPG-32 USCGC Campbell heading to port at Norfolk Navy Yard on July 26, 1943.

On 21 February 1943, Campbell was escorting the 48-ship convoy ON 166 when the convoy was surrounded by a U-boat "wolf pack". U-92 and U-753 torpedoed and sank whale factory ship N.T. Nielsen Alonso. Dispatched to assist, Campbell rescued fifty survivors and then turned to attack U-753, damaging it so badly that it had to withdraw. Throughout 21 and 22 February, Campbell attacked several U-boats, inflicting damage and driving them off. Later on 22 February, U-606, having sustained heavy damage inflicted by the Polish destroyer ORP Burza, surfaced in the midst of the convoy attempting a surface attack. Campbell struck the U-boat a glancing blow that gashed Campbell's hull in the engine room below the waterline, but continued to attack, dropping two depth charges which exploded and lifted the U-boat out of the water. The crew brought all guns to bear on the U-boat, fighting on until water in the engine room shorted out all electricity. As the ship lost power and the searchlights illuminating the U-boat went out, the U-boat's commander ordered the vessel abandoned. Campbell ceased fire and lowered boats to rescue the U-boat's survivors. Campbell, disabled in the attack, was towed to port nine days later, repaired and returned to escort duty.

Illustrator Anton Otto Fischer, working for Life magazine, was serving as a lieutenant commander aboard Campbell for this voyage. His series of detailed oil paintings depicting the battle and its aftermath appeared in Life's 5 July 1943 edition.

=== Luftwaffe attack, May 1944 ===
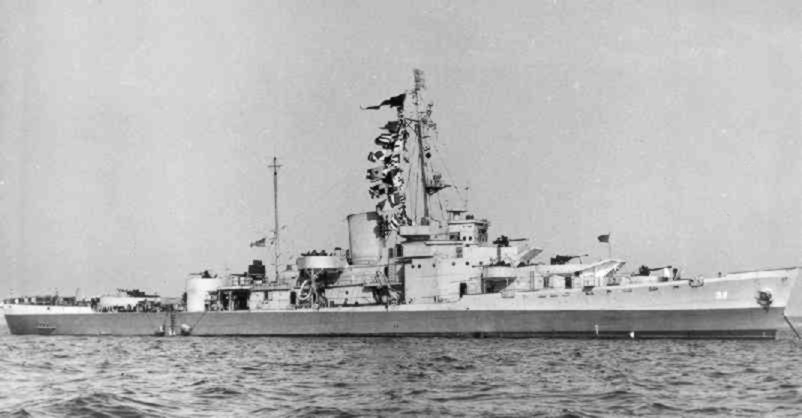
Campbell in 1944

In April 1944, the Convoy UGS-40, consisting of some 80 vessels, sailed for the Mediterranean, led by Campbell. The escort screen contained three destroyers, six American destroyer escorts from CortDiv 5, and two French destroyer escorts. Due to recent attacks by the Luftwaffe against Allied convoys in the western Mediterranean, UGS-40 sailed with an elaborate air defense plan, formulated by the convoy's screen commander, Commander Jesse C. Sowell, aboard Campbell. Practiced in Hampton Roads prior to the convoy's departure and as it crossed the Atlantic, these tactics were designed to meet mass aerial attacks by German aircraft carrying a variety of weapons ranging from bombs, to torpedoes, to radio-controlled glider bombs. Off Gibraltar, UGS-40 acquired additional escorts: British antiaircraft cruiser HMS Caledon, the destroyer escort USS Wilhoite, the destroyer USS Benson, and two American minesweepers (USS Steady and USS Sustain) carrying special apparatus to jam radar transmissions and thus confuse the German glider bombs. On 9 May 1944, the convoy passed through the Straits of Gibraltar en route to Bizerte, Tunisia, without incident, but two days later detected German "snoopers" trailing the convoy. In the next few hours, ten successive shore-based fighter interception sorties failed to drive off the enemy reconnaissance aircraft. First alerted by shore-based radar, the escort screen went to general quarters at 13:16 on 11 May, beginning the first of five successive alerts. In Campbell, Commander Sowell warned the escorts to be alert to the possibility of a dusk attack. At 20:25, radar noted the approach of enemy aircraft, and Sowell formed the convoy into eight columns 1,000 yards (910 m) apart for maneuvering room. When the enemy was reported 70 miles (110 km) north of Cape Corbelin, UGS-40 steered due east, past Cape Bengut. Shortly after sunset, escort ships commenced laying smoke screens, as the German aircraft, a mixed force of Junkers Ju 88s, Heinkel He 111s, and Dornier Do 217s, approached from the stern of the convoy and broke into groups to attack from different points of the compass. The destroyer escorts and friendly fighter craft downed an estimated 17 of the enemy planes, and drove away all the remainder, and the Allied convoy emerged unscathed.

== Later service ==
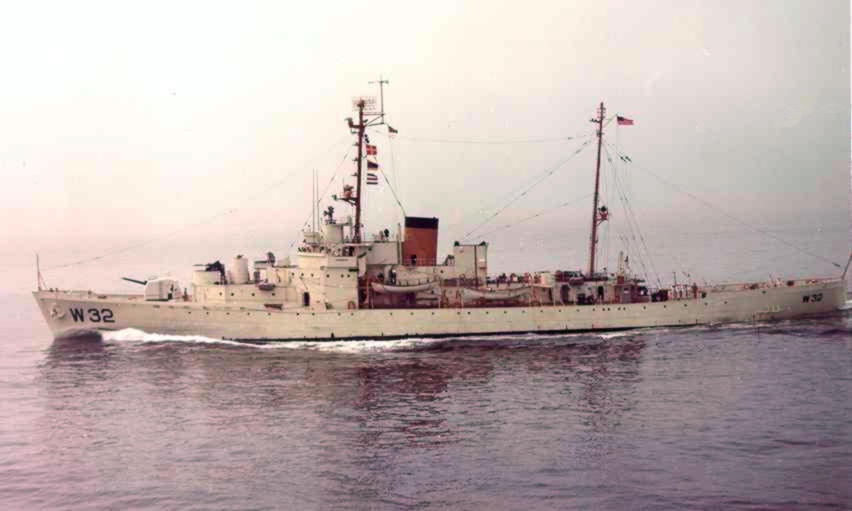
USCGC Campbell (WPG-32) in 1963

After conversion to an Amphibious Command Ship (Type AGC) in the Boston Navy Yard between 4 January and 28 March 1945, Campbell was assigned to duty in the Pacific as an Amphibious Flagship. She sailed from Pearl Harbor for Saipan and arrived on 3 August 1945, sailing again for Manila on 10 August, and Leyte on 19 August. On 1 October 1945 she was anchored at Wakanoura Wan, Honshū, Japan as the flagship for Communications Service Division 103. On 30 October she sailed to Sasebo and stayed until 30 November when she was ordered back to the U.S. Back in the U.S., she was based in Charleston, S.C. under Cmdr. Montegue Frederick Garfield. In August 1948, Campbell found wreckage from an Air France Latécoère 631 aircraft which had crashed into the Atlantic Ocean with the loss of all 52 people on board. In January 1959, Campbell was one of the ships which answered the distress call of Hans Hedtoft which had struck an iceberg off Greenland. She participated in the search until it was called off on 7 February.

=== Vietnam ===
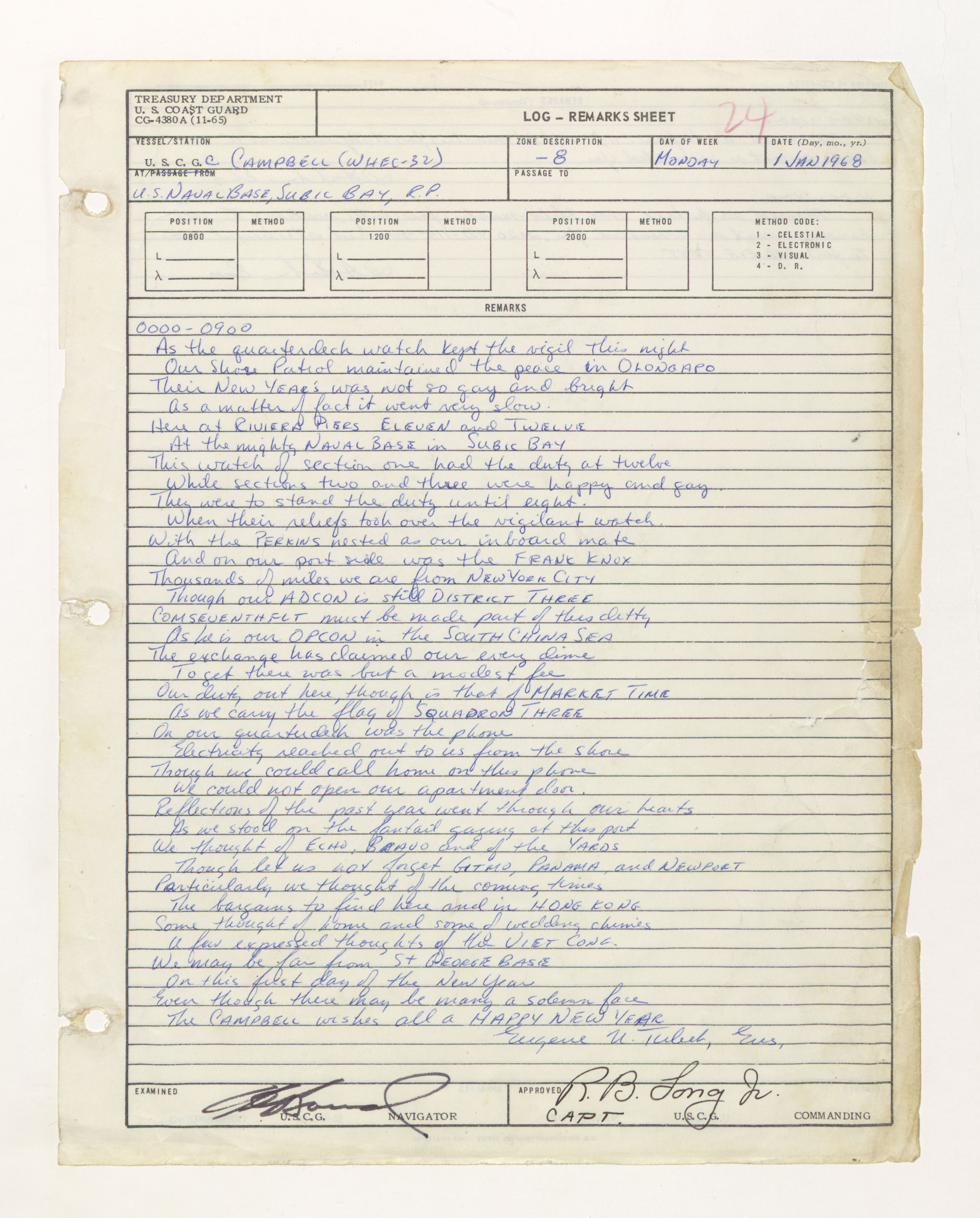
USCGC Campbell (WPG-32) log book entry January 1, 1968

Campbell was assigned to combat duty in Vietnam from January to July 1968. During Operation Market Time, Campbell destroyed or damaged 105 Viet Cong structures and steamed over 32,000 miles (51,000 km) in the Vietnamese War Zone.

After returning from Vietnam, Campbell was assigned to routine Search-and-Rescue, Maritime Law Enforcement, Military Readiness, and Ocean Station duties.

She was homeported at Governors Island in New York City until 1969 when she moved to Portland, Maine. In 1974 her homeport was again changed, this time to Port Angeles, Washington. There she continued her peacetime duties until decommissioned in 1982. At the time of decommissioning, Campbell was the oldest active continually commissioned vessel in the United States Coast Guard.

== Sinking ==
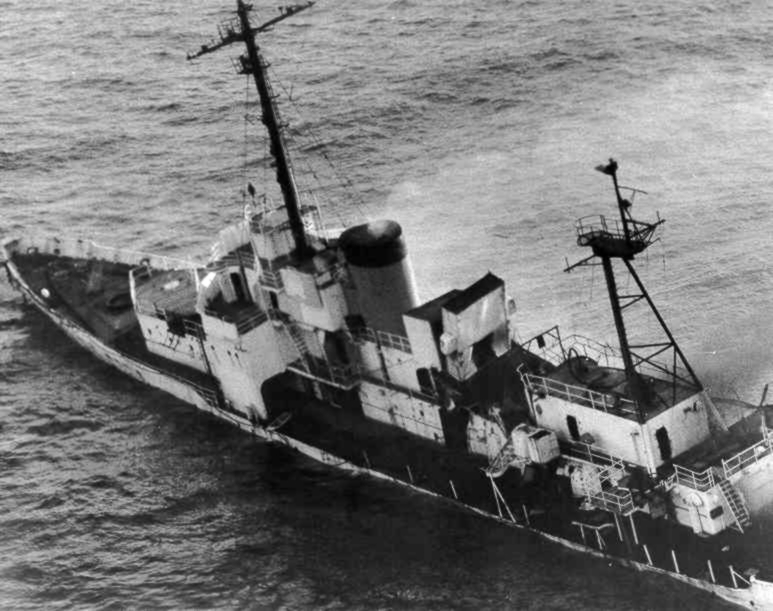
Campbell with port decks awash following hit from US Navy Harpoon missile

USCGC Campbell was sunk on 29 November 1984 as a target in the mid-Pacific Ocean by the United States Navy at coordinates 22°48′N 160°06′W, northwest of Hawaii, and rests at 2,800 fathoms (5,100 m). A final message was transmitted as the ship, which remained largely intact after a Harpoon missile strike, went down. It said:

UNCLAS //N05752//
SUBJ: FINAL FAREWELL

1. I SERVED WITH HONOR FOR ALMOST FORTY-SIX YEARS, IN WAR AND PEACE, IN THE ATLANTIC AND PACIFIC. WITH DUTY AS DIVERSE AS SAVING LIVES TO SINKING U-BOATS, OCEAN STATIONS TO FISHERIES ENFORCEMENT, AND FROM TRAINING CADETS TO BEING YOUR FLAGSHIP. I HAVE BEEN ALWAYS READY TO SERVE.

2. TODAY WAS MY FINAL DUTY. I WAS A TARGET FOR A MISSILE TEST. ITS SUCCESS WAS YOUR LOSS AND MY DEMISE. NOW KING NEPTUNE HAS CALLED ME TO MY FINAL REST IN 2,600 FATHOMS AT 22-48N 160-06W.

3. MOURN NOT, ALL WHO HAVE SAILED WITH ME. A NEW CUTTER CAMPBELL BEARING MY NAME, WMEC-909, WILL SOON CONTINUE THE HERITAGE. I BID ADIEU. THE QUEEN IS DEAD. LONG LIVE THE QUEEN.

== Awards ==
- Coast Guard Meritorious Unit Commendation
- American Defense Service Medal with "FLEET" clasp and "A" device
- American Campaign Medal with "A" device
- European-African-Middle Eastern Campaign Medal with three battle stars
- Asiatic-Pacific Campaign Medal
- World War II Victory Medal
- Navy Occupation Medal with "ASIA" clasp
- National Defense Service Medal with one service star
- Vietnam Service Medal with two campaign stars
- Humanitarian Service Medal
- Philippine Presidential Unit Citation
- Vietnam Gallantry Cross with palm
- Philippine Liberation Medal with two service stars
- Republic of Vietnam Campaign Medal

| Preceded by none | United States Coast Guard "Queen of the Fleet"; 1970s?–1982 | Succeeded by USCGC Duane (WPG-33) |
