= SS W.H. Gilcher =

Steam lake freighter sunk in Lake Michigan

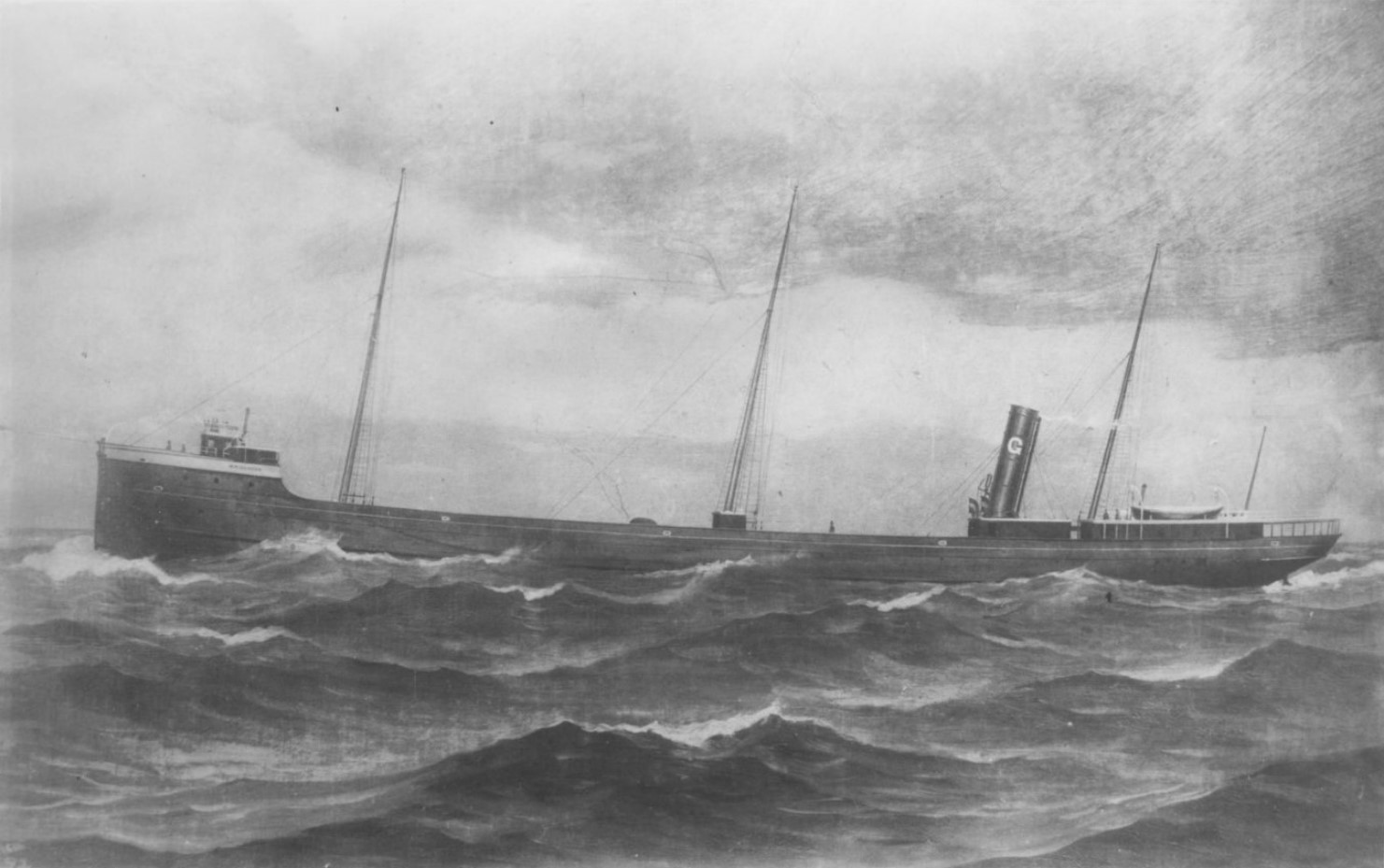

History

United States
- Name: W. H. Gilcher
- Namesake: William H. Gilcher
- Owner: Gilchrist, Gilcher & Schuck
- Builder: Cleveland Shipbuilding Co., Cleveland
- Cost: US$200,000
- Yard number: 10
- Launched: 18 December 1890
- Completed: 12 May 1891
- Commissioned: 12 May 1891
- Maiden voyage: 13 May 1891
- Homeport: Sandusky
- Identification: US Official Number 81326
- Fate: Sank, 28 October 1892

General characteristics
- Type: Bulk carrier
- Tonnage: 2,414.64 GRT; 1,986.70 NRT; 3,000 DWT
- Length: 301.5 ft (91.9 m)
- Beam: 41.2 ft (12.6 m)
- Depth: 21.1 ft (6.4 m)
- Propulsion: Cleveland Shipbuilding Co. 3-cylinder triple expansion
- Speed: 9 1/2 knots (10.9 mph; 17.6 km/h)

W.H. Gilcher was a steam lake freighter built in 1890–1891 by Cleveland Shipbuilding Company of Cleveland for Gilchrist, Gilcher & Schuck of Sandusky, with intention of transporting cargo between various ports located on the Great Lakes. The ship was named after William H. Gilcher, one of the owners of the company. In October 1892 the freighter ran into a strong gale on Lake Michigan and foundered with the loss of all eighteen men.

== Design and construction ==
In early 1890 William H. Gilcher and Randall E. Schuck, noted lumber merchants from Sandusky and Joseph C. Gilchrist of Vermilion, actively engaged in operating of various vessels on the Great Lakes, decided to build a new large steam freighter to transport various cargo as addition to their fleet. On 24 June 1890 it was reported that the partners agreed on the contract worth approximately US$200,000 with Cleveland Shipbuilding Co. to construct such vessel, largely identical to another ship being built by the shipyard, SS Western Reserve. The ship was laid down at the shipbuilder's yard on Detroit Street in Cleveland in early August 1890 and launched on 18 December 1890 (yard number 10). The freighter was not christened at the time of the launching and was known only as "Hull No. 10" until she was completed in spring of 1891. Large number of people was present at the launching, including local dignitaries such as John E. Schuck, John B. Cowle, judge James M. Coffinberry and his son Henry D. Coffinberry. In March 1891 the ship was officially christened W.H. Gilcher.

The vessel was designed specifically as a bulk carrier capable of carrying approximately 140,000 cubic feet of bulk cargo on each trip. The ship had two decks with forecastle, spar deck and bridge located on top of her main deck, had her propulsion machinery located aft and had six main cargo holds. Both W.H. Gilcher and Western Reserve were two of the first lake freighters to be constructed out of steel plate and not wood or iron as was a common practice. Use of steel made it possible to build a larger vessel capable of carrying heavier loads than steamships operating on the lakes at the time.

As built, the ship was 301.5 feet (91.9 m) long (between perpendiculars) and 41.2 feet (12.6 m) abeam, with a depth of 21.1 feet (6.4 m). W.H. Gilcher was originally assessed at 2,414.64 GRT and 1,986.70 NRT and had deadweight of approximately 3,000. The vessel had a steel hull and a single 1,200 horsepower reciprocating triple expansion steam engine, with cylinders of 20-inch (51 cm), 33-inch (84 cm) and 54-inch (140 cm) diameter with a 40-inch (100 cm) stroke, that drove a single screw propeller and moved the ship at up to 9 1/2 knots (10.9 mph; 17.6 km/h). The steam for the engine was supplied by two single-ended Scotch marine boilers fitted for coal.

== Operational history ==
Following delivery and opening of navigation season on Great Lakes W.H. Gilcher was commissioned for service and departed Cleveland on 13 May 1891 on her maiden voyage carrying a cargo of coal bound for Milwaukee. From there the freighter returned in ballast and proceeded to Buffalo where she embarked 3,150 tons of coal for delivery to South Chicago, the largest cargo of coal to be carried from Buffalo at the time. W.H. Gilcher broke that record in September 1892 by bringing in over 3,255 tons of coal to Chicago for delivery to locations out west. The freighter continued moving various cargoes such as wheat, corn, coal and iron ore between different ports on Great Lakes through the end of her short career. In September 1892 she also set a record for amount of grain transported from Chicago as she brought in 113,885 bushels of wheat to Buffalo. Previously, it was also reported that she carried 114,982 bushels of corn from Chicago to Buffalo on one of her journeys.

During her short career, the freighter had several mishaps. In April 1892 it was reported that she went aground at Point Edward on the Canadian side of the river after her wheel chains parted. The vessel broke her wheel again in ice in Duluth only a month later and had to be towed to Buffalo for repairs.

=== Sinking ===
W.H. Gilcher departed on her last voyage on 26 October 1892 from Buffalo carrying 3,080 tons of coal bound for Milwaukee. The ship was under command of captain Leeds H. Weeks and had a crew of eighteen. The trip was initially uneventful and the freighter passed through the Straits of Mackinaw around 14:30 on October 28 entering Lake Michigan. The vessel was expected to reach her destination by October 30 but never arrived. A powerful storm that swept over the northern parts of Lake Michigan and Lake Huron on October 28–29 caused widespread delays and damage to many vessels. Only after the storm subsided, and the ships started arriving in ports some information about W.H. Gilcher fate could be discovered. Captain Buchanan of schooner Seaman reported observing a large steamer struggling against the wind in the storm around 20 miles northwest of North Manitou Island at about 20:00 on October 28. It appeared the steamer was unresponsive and no signs of life were observed. Captain Dennis of schooner John Shaw observed large amount of wreckage including furniture and part of the bridge floating in the lake when passing off the South Manitou Island. A medium size sailing vessel was also sighted bottom up on the beach of the island, later identified as schooner Ostrich. Steamer White and Friant picked up pieces of pilot house belonging to W.H. Gilcher from the same general area. As more debris from the freighter came ashore on Manitou islands it became clear she foundered in the storm and there were no survivors. On November 18 it was reported that two dead bodies wearing W.H. Gilcher life preserves were found on Fox Island along with the mizzenmast from the steamer. The bodies were later recovered by tug Onward and brought to Traverse City on 3 January 1893.

Quick loss of both Western Reserve and W.H. Gilcher under similar circumstances renewed criticism of using steel for ship construction. Steel production was revolutionized by introduction of the Bessemer process which helped to bring the cost of steel significantly down and made it comparable to that of iron. However, due to the short duration of the Bessemer process it allowed little time to adjust composition of the alloying elements in the steel. In particular, phosphorus could not be efficiently removed from molten steel, and widespread use of blowing air instead of oxygen additionally introduced nitrogen into steel. Presence of both of these elements reduced ductility of final product, resulting in material that was not able to withstand frequent compression, extension and torsion loads experienced by these types of vessels during their journeys.

As of 2024 the W.H. Gilcher is the largest shipwreck on Lake Michigan whose location is not known, following the discovery of wreck of the car ferry SS Pere Marquette No. 18.
