= Augo Lynge =

Greenlandic politician (1899–1959)

Danish Parliament Member
- In office 1953 – 30 January 1959

Greenland National Council Member
- In office 1951–1953

Chairman of the Nuuk municipal councils
- In office 1934–1938

Nuuk Municipal Councils Member
- In office 1930–1942

Personal details
- Born: 16 October 1899 Fiskenæsset, Nuuk, Greenland
- Died: 30 January 1959 (aged 59) Cape Farewell, Greenland
- Spouses: Qetura Heilmann (m. 1925; died 1939); Emilie Lund (m. 1940)
- Children: 9
- Education: Nuuk Seminarium

Augustinus "Augo" Telef Nis Lynge (16 October 1899 – 30 January 1959) was a Greenlandic politician, educator, poet, novelist and Kalaaleq nationalist who was the first Greenlandic representative in the Danish parliament and died during the sinking of the MS Hans Hedtoft.

== Early life ==
Augustinus Telef Nis Lynge was born 16 October 1899 in the settlement Fiskenæsset (Qeqertarsuatsiaat) 130 km south of Godthåb (Nuuk) as the son of the local catechist Pavia Lynge (died 1943) and his wife Bendthea (née Heilmann). He had five siblings.

=== School career ===
Lynge graduated from Godthåb Seminarium in Nuuk in 1921 as a teacher and went on to complete several courses at Jelling College from 1922 to 1923. He subsequently completed a special course in a school in Copenhagen from 1923 to 1924 before working as a teacher at Godthåb Seminarium. In 1930 Lynge went on to be a teacher at the Nuuk College.

=== Family ===
Augo Lynge married Qetura Heilmann (born 4 December 1901 in Godthåb), daughter of hunter Peter Heilmann and Martha Holm, on 12 July 1925. Qetura died in 1939.

He married for the second time on 8 December 1940 to Emilie Lund, the daughter of carpenter Peter Lund and Helga Møller. They remained married until Lynge's death in 1959.

== Political career ==
Lynge started in politics in 1930 when he was elected to the municipal council in Godthåb, and became of the council in 1934. He ended his term as chairman in 1938 and also ended his term in the councils itself in 1942. In 1941 he also founded the youth association 'Nuvavta qitornai' which was founded to arouse the Greenlandic youth to greater political awareness and responsibility.

Lynge was a member of the Danish parliament's Greenland Committee in 1939, 1945–1946 and 1951–1953. After that he was elected in 1951 to the National Council and its Greenland committee until 1953. He was by 1950 Greenland's leading political personality because of his political thoughts which were motivated by the desire to bring the Greenlanders out of stagnation, poverty, ignorance and disease by developing society and bringing it up to a modern standard in all areas of Greenland.

Lynge, along with Frederik Lynge, became the first Greenlandic representatives to the Danish parliament in 1953, during this time he also became Chairman of the Greenland People's Educational Association, a position he held until 1955. He remained a member of the Danish parliament until his death. In 1952 he became a Knight of the Order of Dannebrog.

=== Writing career ===
Lynge edited the journal Tarqigssut (The Lamp Trimmer) from 1934 to 1948, mainly for the youth association Nunavta qitornai (The Children of Our Country), which he founded in 1941. The journal was also committed to political and social concerns. He also wrote the future-novel Ukiut 300 ngornerat (Greenland the 300th anniversary of Hans Egede's arrival) in 1931. The novel has been translated into Danish under the title Trehundrede år efter in 1989 and into French under the title Trois cents ans après. Grønlandshavn en 2021 in 2016. He also wrote a number of textbooks in zoology, geography and Greenland. He also wrote the poems Erinarsungaartarit nipit qiimasut anikkit, Nuannarisannik oqassaguma and Aalisartut qangatut ajornikuujumaarput.

== Death ==
Lynge went on the maiden voyage of the MS Hans Hedtoft which sailed from Julianehaab, Greenland, to Copenhagen, Denmark, on 29 January 1959. However the next day, the ship collided with an iceberg about 35 miles (56 km) south of Cape Farewell. A few distress calls were sent out by the ship, but rescue ships didn't reach them in time and the ship sank on 30 January 1959.

Several ships and helicopters were sent out but were unable to find any survivors or traces of wreckage, the search was called off on 7 February 1959 with all 95 passengers and crew assumed to have perished. Neither any bodies nor the wreck of the ship have ever been found with the exception of a lifebuoy discovered on the shore of Iceland, 9 months after the sinking, which is now located in the church at Julianehaab.
