= Neustria (ship) =

Neustria was a passenger-cargo steamship of the French Fabre Line. Built in 1883 by Claparede and Company, Rouen, France, she was 105.0 meters (344.5 feet) long and had a beam of 12.9 meters (42 feet). Neustria had a compound engine and single screw, one funnel, two masts, and a straight stem, and was of iron construction. She could carry 8 first-class passengers and 1,000 passengers in steerage. She was employed on the Marseille–New York City route with a stop in Spain. In the Spanish–American War during 1898, Spain used Neustria to bring back Spanish troops from Cuba. In March 1903, she carried 1200 Saint Malo fishermen to Saint Pierre and Miquelon.

According to the Statue of Liberty-Ellis Island Foundation website, the Neustria transported immigrants from Naples, Italy, via Marseilles to the Port of New York, from which they were ferried by barges to Ellis Island, from 1892 to 1908.

On October 27, 1908, Neustria sailed from New York for Marseille, with grain and general cargo, and vanished without a trace. She was not carrying any passengers at the time, but her entire crew of 40 was lost. Her wreck has never been found and her fate remains a mystery.
