= MS Hans Hedtoft =

20th-century Danish ship

- MS Hans Hedtoft

History

Denmark
- Name: Hans Hedtoft
- Namesake: Hans Hedtoft
- Owner: Royal Greenland Trading Company
- Builder: Frederikshavns Værft, Frederikshavn
- Yard number: 226
- Launched: 13 August 1958
- Completed: 17 December 1958
- Maiden voyage: 7 January 1959
- Out of service: 30 January 1959
- Homeport: (Denmark) Copenhagen
- Identification: call sign OXKA
- Fate: Lost to an iceberg collision, 30 January 1959

General characteristics
- Tonnage: 2,857 GRT; 1,368 NRT
- Length: 82.65 m (271 ft 2 in)
- Beam: 14.17 m (46 ft 6 in)
- Depth: 6.43 m (21 ft 1 in)
- Capacity: 60 passengers
- Crew: 40 crew
- Armament: 3 × 40 mm anti-aircraft guns

MS Hans Hedtoft was a Danish cargo passenger liner that struck an iceberg and sank on 30 January 1959 on her maiden voyage off the coast of Western Greenland. The only piece of the wreckage found was a lifebelt.

== Description ==
Hans Hedtoft was 82.65 metres (271 ft 2 in) long, with a beam of 14.17 metres (46 ft 6 in) and a depth of 6.43 metres (21 ft 1 in). She was assessed at 2,875 GRT, 1,368 NRT.

Hans Hedtoft was built by Frederikshavns Værft at Frederikshavn in northern Denmark. She was yard number 226, launched on 13 August 1958 and completed on 17 December. She had a double bottom and seven watertight compartments and an armoured bow and stern. She was designed to provide a year-round service between Denmark and Greenland. Hans Hedtoft had a riveted hull, a feature which was criticised by Knud Lauritzen, a shipowner. Lauritzen claimed that a riveted hull was not as resistant to ice pressure as a welded hull. Hans Hedtoft had the code letters and radio call sign OXKA. The ship was named after a former prime minister of Denmark.

The ship was armed with three 40 mm anti-aircraft guns, on the orders of the Danish Ministry of Defence (MoD). The armament was not part of the original plans, and the ship was strengthened in three places to take the guns. An ammunition room was built into the bow of the ship. The MoD provided the anti-aircraft guns free of charge. Although fitted during tests, the guns were dismounted and carried aboard Hans Hedtoft at the time of her sinking. An order had been issued that the guns were to be removed from the ship immediately after she arrived back in Copenhagen. It was claimed that the arming of Hans Hedtoft resulted in a warship being constructed without the approval of the Folketing.

== Sinking ==
Hans Hedtoft sailed from Copenhagen on her maiden voyage on 7 January 1959. Her voyage to Julianehaab, Greenland, was made in record time. Hans Hedtoft called at Nuuk, Sisimiut and Maniitsoq before returning to Julianehaab.

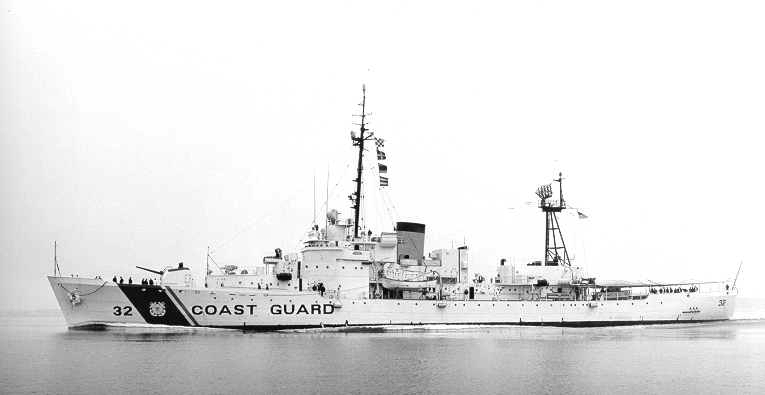
USCGC Campbell

On 29 January, she began her return journey. The ship had 40 crew, 55 passengers and a cargo of frozen fish on board and in addition to that 3.25 tons of archives concerning Greenlandic history. One of her passengers was the Danish parliament (Folketing) member Augo Lynge. The next day, Hans Hedtoft collided with an iceberg about 35 nautical miles (65 km) south of Cape Farewell, the southernmost point of Greenland. A distress call was given at 13:56 (local time) stating that the ship had hit an iceberg at 59°30′N 43°00′W. The call was answered by USCGC Campbell, the West German trawler Johannes Krüss of Bremerhaven and another West German trawler. Within an hour, another message was sent stating that the engine room was flooded. At 15:12, it was announced that the ship was sinking. A final message was sent at 17:41 stating the ship was slowly sinking and requesting immediate assistance. Aircraft in Newfoundland were grounded by the weather and unable to assist in the search for Hans Hedtoft. The beginning of an SOS was received by Johannes Krüss at 18:06 after which communication with Hans Hedtoft was lost.

Both Johannes Krüss, and U.S. Coast Guard cutter Campbell were in the area near Hans Hedtoft and immediately turned toward Hans Hedtoft's position after the initial distress call. However, due to rough seas, floating ice, dwindling daylight and generally bad visibility they were unable to reach the position provided by Hans Hedtoft before she sank later that afternoon. Johannes Krüss, commanded by Kapitän Albert Sierck, after a dangerous voyage in the ice-filled stormy waters, is believed to have made it to the position of Hans Hedtoft only a few minutes after her sinking, but was unable to find any survivors under the extremely difficult conditions.

On 31 January, USCGC Campbell reported that conditions were worse than anything the ship had seen while on transatlantic convoy duty during World War II, and there was no sign of Hans Hedtoft or her passengers and crew. The search was called off on 7 February. The only piece of wreckage ever recovered was a lifering which washed ashore on Iceland and was discovered on 7 October 1959, some nine months after the ship sank. The ship sank with parish registers from parishes of Greenland, which were meant to be deposited in archives in Denmark, causing a major loss for Greenlandic genealogy.

As a result of the sinking, the airfield at Narsarsuaq, Greenland, which had closed in November 1958, was reopened. An appeal fund for the relatives of the victims was opened. Kr40,000 (then £2,000) was raised amongst ten countries in two months. Compensation for the relatives amounted to Kr1,184,936 (then £59,000).

== Legacy ==
On 30 January 2005, Queen Margrethe unveiled a monument at North Atlantic Wharf, Copenhagen, to the 95 people lost on Hans Hedtoft.

The shipwreck is the theme of the 2014 song "All Hope Abandon" by the Greenlandic band Small Time Giants.
