= Octavius =

Octavius may refer to:

== Topics of Antiquity ==
- Augustus, or Octavius, the first Roman emperor
- Octavia gens, ancient Roman family (includes a list of its members known as Octavius)
- Octavius (praenomen), a Latin personal name
- Octavius Mamilius, 5th-century BC ruler in Italy
- Octavius (King of the Britons) or Eudaf Hen, a figure in Welsh mythology
- Octavius (dialogue), a 2nd-century defence of Christianity

== Modern-era people with the name ==
- Prince Octavius of Great Britain (1779–1783), son of King George III
- Octavius Beale (1850–1930), Australian piano manufacturer
- Octavius Catto (1839–1871), American educator and civil rights activist
- Octavius Coope (1814–1886), English businessman and politician
- Octavius Duncombe (1817–1879), English politician
- Octavius Ellis (born 1993), American basketball player
- Octavius Frothingham (1822–1895), American clergyman
- Octavius D. Gass (1828–1924), American businessman and politician
- Octavius Gilchrist (1779–1823), English antiquary
- Octavius Hadfield (1814–1904), New Zealand bishop
- Octavius Hammond (1835–1908), English clergyman
- Octavius Leigh-Clare (1841–1912), English lawyer and politician
- Octavius Mathias (1805–1864), New Zealand clergyman
- Octavius Vaughan Morgan (1837–1896), Welsh politician
- Octavius Oakley (1800–1867), English artist
- Octavius Pickard-Cambridge (1828–1917), English zoologist
- Octavius Radcliffe (1859–1940), English cricket player
- Octavius Ryland (1800–1886), Australian educator
- Octavius Sturges (1833–1895), English physician
- Octavius Temple (1784–1834), colonial administrator in Sierra Leone
- Octavius Terry (born 1972), American athlete
- Octavius Vernon-Harcourt (1793–1863), Royal Navy officer
- Octavius Wigram (1794–1878), English businessman
- Octavius Winslow (1808–1878), English clergyman

== Other uses ==
- Octavius (ship), an 18th-century ghost ship
- Pint or octavius, a unit of measurement
- Octavius, a fictional character in a series of silent films portrayed by actor Herbert Yost
- Octavius (horse), a 19th-century racehorse

== See also ==
- Gaius Octavius (disambiguation)
- Gnaeus Octavius (disambiguation)
- Lucius Octavius (name)
- Marcus Octavius
- Octavian (disambiguation)
- Ottavio
- Otto Octavius or Dr. Octopus, a villain of the Spider-Man comics
