= Ghost ship =

Ship with no living people on board

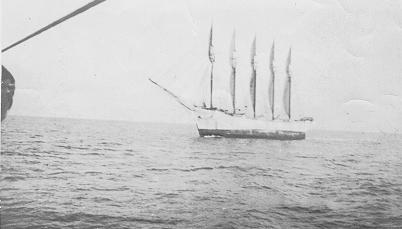
The mysteriously derelict schooner Carroll A. Deering, as seen from the Cape Lookout lightship on 28 January 1921

A ghost ship, also known as a phantom ship, is a vessel with no living crew aboard; it may be a fictional ghostly vessel, such as the Flying Dutchman, or a physical derelict found adrift with its crew missing or dead, like the Mary Celeste. The term is sometimes used for ships that have been decommissioned but not yet scrapped, as well as drifting boats that have been found after breaking loose of their ropes and being carried away by the wind or the waves.

Typically, derelict ghost ships did not remain adrift for very long, though there have been ghost ships that have been reported to remain adrift for many years, and their fates have remained unknown, such as SS Baychimo and Governor Parr.

More recently, ships which travel with their mandated automatic identification system (AIS) turned off to avoid detection and monitoring have also been referred to as ghost ships.

== Chronology ==
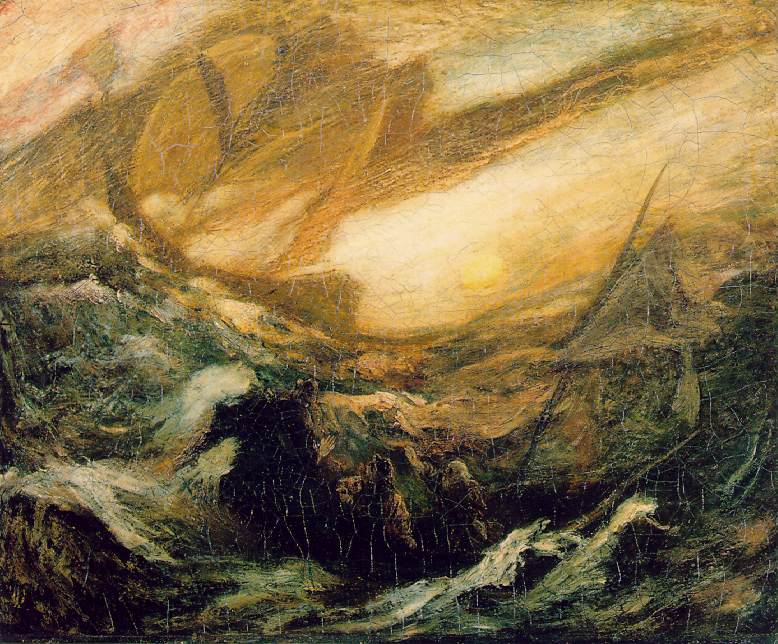
The Flying Dutchman by Albert Pinkham Ryder

=== Folklore, legends, and mythology ===
- Undated – Chasse-galerie is a haunted canoe doomed to paddle the skies of Quebec.
- Undated – The Caleuche is a mythical ghost ship that, according to local folklore and Chilote mythology, sails the seas around Chiloé Island, Chile at night.
- Undated – The Fireship of Baie des Chaleurs is a form of ghost light, an unusual visual phenomenon that appears at Bathurst, New Brunswick, Canada. The phenomenon has been the source of many a tall tale, and has been said to appear as a flaming three-mast galley much like the style of ship featured on New Brunswick's provincial flag.
- 1748 onwards – The Lady Lovibond is said to have been deliberately wrecked on 13 February 1748 off Goodwin Sands, Kent, England, and to reappear off the Kent coast every fifty years.
- 18th century onwards – The Ghost Ship of Northumberland Strait is the apparition of a burning ship that is regularly reported between Prince Edward Island and New Brunswick, Canada.
- 1795 onwards – The Flying Dutchman is said to be a ship commanded by a captain condemned to eternally sail the seas. It has long been the principal ghost ship legend among mariners and has inspired several works.
- 19th century onwards – The Princess Augusta, misremembered in local folklore as the Palatine, was wrecked near Block Island, Rhode Island, U.S., in 1738. Since then, an apparition known as the Palatine Light has been reported.
- 1813 onwards – After the American schooner Young Teazer was sunk in an explosion in Mahone Bay, Nova Scotia, Canada during the War of 1812, a burning apparition known as the "Teazer Light" has been reported.
- 1858 onwards – The Eliza Battle was a paddle steamer that burned in 1858 on the Tombigbee River, Alabama, U.S. She is reported to reappear, fully aflame, on cold and windy winter nights to foretell of impending disaster.
- 1872 or 1882 – A legend states that the Iron Mountain mysteriously disappeared in 1872 and left barges it was towing floating down the river. In reality, the ship ran aground and sank north of Vicksburg, Mississippi, United States in 1882 and its destruction was never mysterious.
- 1878 onwards – An apparition of HMS Eurydice has been reported where the ship sank in 1878 off the Isle of Wight, English Channel. Witnesses include a Royal Navy submarine in the 1930s and Prince Edward, Earl of Wessex, in 1998.
- 1886 – The Phantom Canoe of Lake Rotomahana was a waka wairua (spirit canoe) in Lake Rotomahana, New Zealand seen eleven days before the deadly eruption of the nearby Mount Tarawera, which devastated the lake and the surrounding area.
- 1895 – A spectral Galleon was allegedly seen in Chapel Cove, Newfoundland. According to folklore, pirates supposedly buried riches in Chapel Cove, and it is said that those who have gone in search of the treasure have either observed the appearance of the phantom ship, or have encountered apparitions on land.
- 1902 – The SS Bannockburn vanished on Lake Superior on November 21, 1902, and subsequently gained a reputation as "the Flying Dutchman of the Great Lakes."
- 1906 – Following the wreck of the SS Valencia in 1906 off the coast of Vancouver Island, British Columbia, Canada, there were reports of a lifeboat with eight skeletons in a nearby sea cave, lifeboats being rowed by skeletons of the Valencia's victims, the shape of Valencia within the black exhaust emanating from the rescue ship City of Topeka's funnel and a phantom ship resembling the Valencia with waves washing over her as human figures held on to the ship's rigging; sailors also reported seeing the ship itself in the area in the years following the sinking, often as an apparition that followed down the coast. One of the lifeboats from Valencia was found adrift in 1933.
- 22 November 1912 – The Rouse Simmons, heavily laden with over 3,000 Christmas trees in its cargo hold and piled high on deck, set sail from Thompson, Michigan for Chicago. The following day it disappeared without trace. For years afterwards, Lake Michigan mariners claimed to have spotted the 'Christmas Tree Ship' appearing out of nowhere with its sails in tatters.
- 1928 – The København was last heard from on December 28, 1928. For two years following its disappearance sightings of a mysterious five-masted ship fitting its description were reported in the Pacific Ocean.

=== Unsubstantiated ===
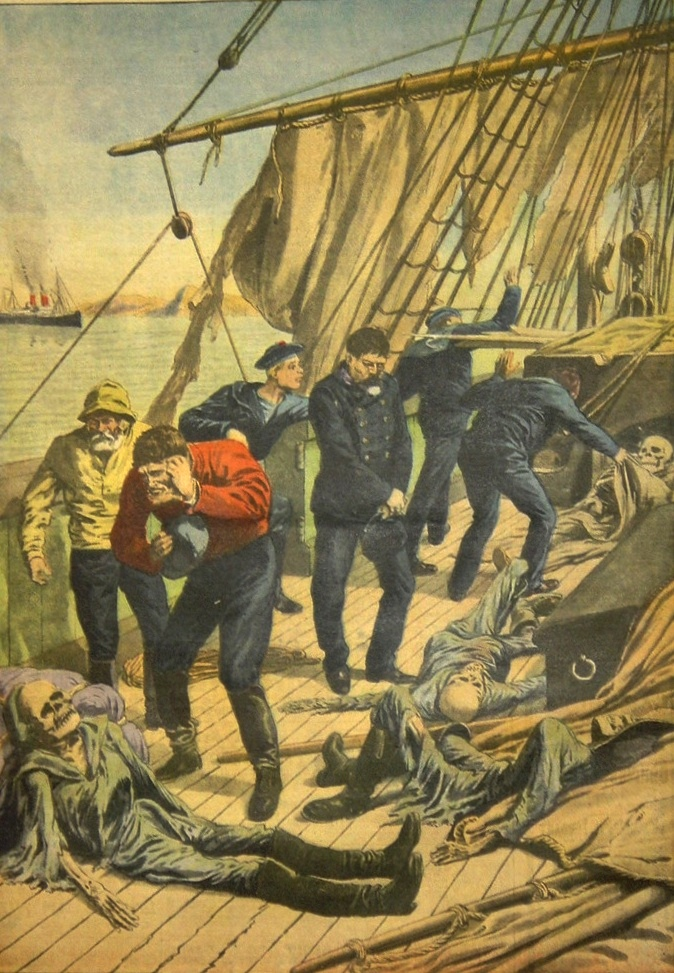
The discovery of the Marlborough, as depicted by Le Petit Journal in 1913

- 1775 – The Octavius, a British merchant ship returning from China, was supposedly found drifting off the coast of Greenland. The captain's log showed that the ship had attempted the Northwest Passage, which at the time had never been successfully traversed. The ship and the bodies of her frozen crew apparently completed the passage after drifting amongst the pack ice for 13 years.
- 1811–1813 – Napoléon Gallois reported that a French frigate had found the French privateer Duc de Dantzig drifting, covered in blood, with the decaying corpses of the crew hacked and crucified to her masts and in the battery. Bloody papers identified Duc de Dantzig and her master, François Aregnaudeau. More soberly, the ship’s register of the maritime archives states "Duc de Dantzig, unheard of as of 1813, presumed lost with all hands".
- 1840 – The schooner Jenny was supposedly discovered after spending 17 years frozen in an ice-barrier of the Drake Passage. Found by Captain Brighton of the whaler Hope, it had been locked in the ice since 1823, the last port of call having been Lima, Peru. The bodies of the seven people aboard, including one woman and a dog, preserved by the Antarctic cold, were buried at sea by the crew of the Hope, and Brighton passed the account on to the Admiralty in London. The Jenny is commemorated by the Jenny Buttress, a feature on King George Island near Melville Peak, named by the UK Antarctic Place-Names Committee in 1960.
- 27 October 1913 – The Singapore newspaper The Straits Times published a story according to which the Marlborough had been discovered near Cape Horn with the skeletons of her crew on board. The Straits Times attributed the story to one published in the London paper the Evening Standard of 3 October 1913. The Evening Standard mentioned that the story was based on an "account cabled from New Zealand" which was yet to be confirmed. The ship that sighted the Marlborough in 1913 was said to be the sailing ship Johnson.
- 1918 - The U-boat UB-65 was supposedly discovered by a United States Navy submarine floating abandoned, shortly before being destroyed by an explosion. There is no record of this happening prior to the ghost story about UB-65's supposed haunting by Hector Charles Bywater, published in his 1932 book Their Secret Purposes: Dramas and Mysteries of the Naval War.
- 1947 – The Ourang Medan is said to have been found adrift off Indonesia with all of its crew dead. The boarding party found the entire crew "frozen, teeth baring, gaping at the sun." Before the ship could be towed to a home port, it exploded and sank. There is no record that a ship of this name ever existed, and it is believed to be an urban legend.

=== Historically attested ===
- 1750 or 1760 – The SV Sea Bird: This merchant brig, under the command of John Huxham (or Husham or Durham), grounded herself at Easton's Beach, Rhode Island. Her longboat was missing. She had been returning from a voyage to Honduras and was expected in Newport that day. The ship was apparently abandoned in sight of land (coffee was boiling on the galley stove) and drifted off course. The only living creatures found on the ship were a dog and a cat. A fictional account of how she became derelict appeared in the Wilmington, Delaware newspaper Sunday Morning Star for 11 October 1885.
- 15 May 1854 – HMS Resolute was a barque-rigged ship of the British Royal Navy that was abandoned after being beset by ice in Viscount Melville Sound, Canada. She had been one of four vessels from Edward Belcher's search expedition for John Franklin. The ship drifted some 1,200 miles (1,900 km) before it was found on 10 September 1855 off the coast of Baffin Island, Canada, freed from the ice. The Resolute desk, which was constructed from the timbers of the ship, resides today in the Oval Office of the White House.

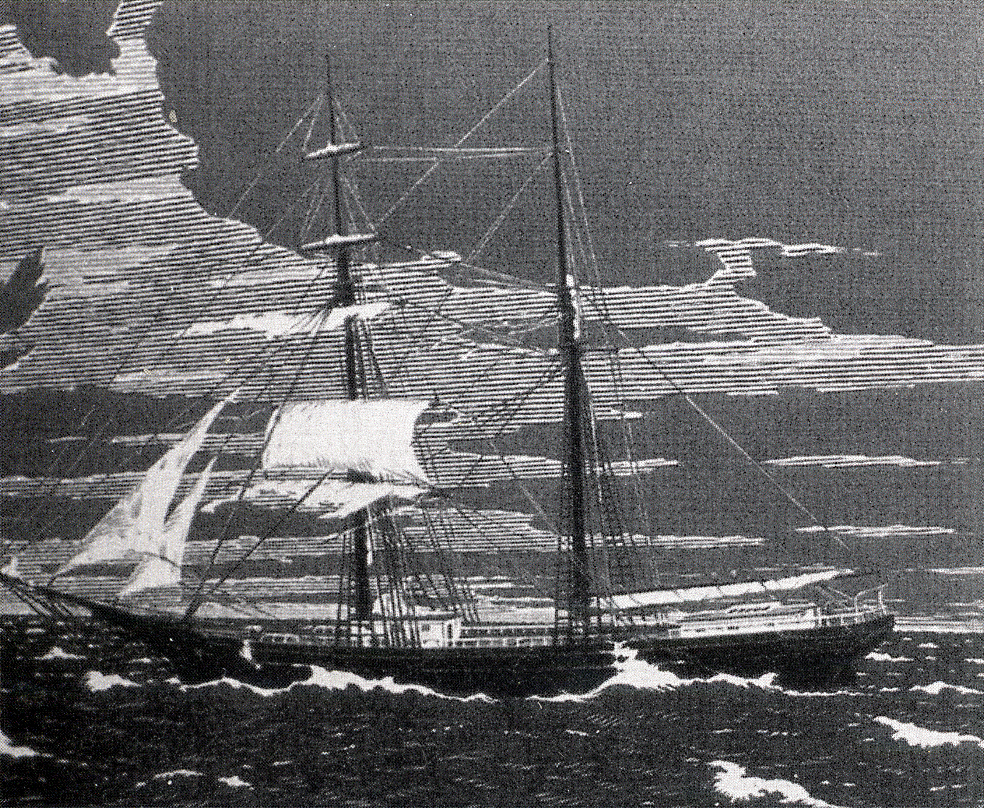
An engraving of Mary Celeste as she was found abandoned

- 25 November 1872 – The SV Mary Celeste, after passing Santa Maria Island in the Azores on 25 November 1872 (the last entry on the ship's slate). The merchant brigantine became derelict in unknown circumstances. No boats were found on board. She was found on 4 December 1872 between mainland Portugal and the Azores archipelago. The ship was devoid of all crew, but largely intact and under sail, heading toward the Strait of Gibraltar. Arthur Conan Doyle's story "J. Habakuk Jephson's Statement" is based on this incident. Doyle alters certain aspects of the original story, including the name of the ship from Mary to Marie Celeste.
- 29 August 1884 – The SV Resolven: This merchant brig was found abandoned between Baccalieu Island and Catalina, Newfoundland and Labrador. Her boats were missing. Her logbook was posted to within six hours of being sighted. Other than a broken yard, she had suffered minimal damage. The galley fire was alight and the lamps were burning. A large iceberg was sighted nearby. It has been claimed that none of the seven crew members or four passengers were accustomed to northern waters and it was suggested that they panicked when the ship was damaged by ice, launched the lifeboat, and swamped, though no bodies were found. Three years later, Resolven was wrecked while returning to Newfoundland from Nova Scotia with a load of lumber.
- 1885 – The SV The Twenty One Friends: This three-masted (tern) schooner was built in 1872. She was financed by a group of 21 Philadelphia Quakers and consequently named the Twenty One Friends. In 1885, returning to Philadelphia with a full load of lumber from Brunswick, Georgia, the ship was rammed by the John D. May off the coast of Cape Hatteras. Capt. Jeffries removed his crew and abandoned the vessel. The ship and cargo were left to the mercy of the sea. Capt. Jeffries’ concern for the safety of his crew was appropriate; however, the Gaskill-made ship proved herself to be more seaworthy than expected. After the collision, the ship was sighted on both sides of the Atlantic over the next two years. She finally came ashore in Ireland, where her cargo was salvaged and she was employed as a fishing vessel.
- 1897 – The abandoned whaler Young Phoenix was reported to have been drifting in the Arctic.
- 22 January 1906 – The SS Valencia's lifeboat no. 5: The lifeboat went adrift when the ship sank off the coast of Vancouver Island, British Columbia, Canada. The lifeboat was found floating in Barkley Sound, Vancouver Island, British Columbia, Canada in remarkably good condition 27 years after the sinking.
- October 1917 – The SV Zebrina: This sailing barge departed Falmouth, Cornwall, England with a cargo of Swansea coal bound for Saint-Brieuc, France. Two days later she was discovered aground on Rozel Point, south of Cherbourg, France, without damage except for some disarrangement of her rigging, but with her crew missing.
- January 1921 – The SV Carroll A. Deering: After passing Cape Lookout Lightship, North Carolina, on 28 January 1921, the Carroll A. Deering, a five-masted cargo schooner, became derelict in unknown circumstances. The ship's lifeboats and logbook were missing when she was found on 31 January 1921 at the Diamond Shoals, off the coast of Cape Hatteras, North Carolina. The final voyage of the ship has been the subject of much debate and controversy, and was investigated by six departments of the US government, largely because it was one of dozens of ships that sank or went missing within a relatively short period of time. While paranormal explanations have been advanced, the theories of mutiny or piracy are considered more likely.
- 3 October 1923 – The SV Governor Parr: This four masted schooner was abandoned by her crew after she lost her mizzen and spanker in a storm while sailing from Ingramport, Nova Scotia, Canada to Buenos Aires, Argentina. The damage incurred by Governor Parr was significant to the masts and deck of the ship; however, she did not sink. Several attempts were made to either destroy or tow this derelict to shore, but all failed. Governor Parr was sighted for many years after her abandonment as she covered large spans of the Atlantic Ocean. She remained a derelict and “menace to navigation”, drifting as far as the Canary Islands. It is unknown what happened to her in the end.
- 24 November 1931 – The SS Baychimo: This cargo steamer was abandoned after being trapped in pack ice near Barrow, Alaska, U.S. and being thought doomed to sink. However, she remained afloat and was sighted at various times between 1931 and 1969 in the Chukchi Sea off the northwestern Alaskan coast without ever being salvaged. She was sighted numerous times, still unmanned and adrift, for nearly forty years. People managed to board her several times, but each time they were either unequipped to salvage her or were driven away by bad weather. This would make her one of the longest sailing ghost ships in the world.

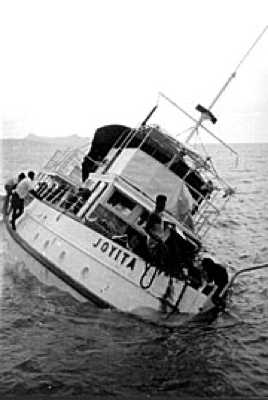
MV Joyita. The ship was partially submerged and listing heavily to port side.

- 3 October 1955 – The MV Joyita: After leaving Apia, Samoa, the refrigerated trading and fishing charter boat Joyita became derelict in unknown circumstances. The ship's dinghy and three Carley-liferafts were missing, and her logbook was also missing, when she was found on 10 November 1955, north of Vanua Levu, Fiji. A subsequent inquiry found the vessel was in a poor state of repair, but determined the fate of passengers and crew to be "inexplicable on the evidence submitted at the inquiry".
- 1959 – The Royal Navy submarine HMS Virulent, lent to the Hellenic Navy in 1946, was found empty in the Bay of Biscay off northern Spain. It subsequently became clear that she had been under tow by another vessel and that the chain had snapped, some three weeks earlier.
- 1 July 1969 – The SV Teignmouth Electron: After the last entry in her log was made on 1 July 1969, the trimaran yacht became derelict in unknown circumstances. The vessel was found on 10 July 1969 in the North Atlantic, latitude 33 degrees 11 minutes North and longitude 40 degrees 26 minutes West. Investigation led to the conclusion that its sole crewmember, Donald Crowhurst, had suffered a mental breakdown while competing in a solo around-the-world race and committed suicide by jumping overboard.
- 1975 – The SV Ocean Wave: Bas Jan Ader was lost at sea while attempting a single-handed west–east crossing of the Atlantic in a 13-foot-long (4.0 m) pocket cruiser, a modified Guppy 13 named Ocean Wave. The passage was part of an art performance titled "In Search of the Miraculous". Radio contact broke off 3 weeks into the voyage, and Ader was presumed lost at sea. The boat was found after 10 months, floating partially submerged 150 miles (240 km) west-southwest of the coast of Ireland. His body was never found. The boat, after being recovered by the Spanish fishing vessel that found it, was taken to Coruña. The boat was later stolen. Ader's mother wrote the poem "From the deep waters of sleep" after having what she described as a premonition of his death.
- December 2002 – The MV High Aim 6, after the owner last spoke to the captain by radio when the ship was near the Marshall Islands, halfway between Papua New Guinea and Hawaii, on 13 December 2002, the MV High Aim 6, a longline fishing boat, became derelict in unknown circumstances. The Taiwanese police deemed a mutiny probable. The ship was found drifting with its crew missing on 3 January 2003 approximately 80 nautical miles (150 km; 92 mi) east of Rowley Shoals, Broome, Australia. The derelict was subsequently scuttled.
- 24 March 2006 – The MT Jian Seng was found drifting 180 kilometres (110 mi) southwest of Weipa, Queensland, Australia. The ship's origin or owner could not be determined, and its engines had been inoperable for some time.
- 24 August 2006 – The SV Bel Amica, a classic schooner, was found derelict near Punta Volpe, Sardinia, Italy. The owner later claimed to have gone home on 14 August 2006 to address an emergency. The Italian press suggested that he may have been avoiding taxation of luxury vessels. The Coast Guard crew that discovered the ship found half eaten Egyptian meals, French maps of North African seas, and a flag of Luxembourg on board.
- 18 April 2007 – The SV Kaz II, a 12-metre-long (39 ft) catamaran set sail on 15 April 2007. She was filmed passing George Point, Hinchinbrook Island, Queensland later that day and on that same day, late in the afternoon, the GPS data showed her to be adrift. She was found adrift on 18 April 2007 near the Great Barrier Reef, 88 nautical miles (163 km) off Townsville, Queensland, Australia. When boarded on 20 April, the engine was running, a laptop was running, the radio and GPS were working and a meal was set to eat, but the three-man crew were not on board. All the sails were up but one was badly shredded, while three life jackets and survival equipment, including an emergency beacon, were found on board. A search for the crew was abandoned on 22 April as it was considered unlikely that anyone could have survived for that period of time. The coroner believed that the men may have fallen overboard.
- 28 October 2008 – The MV Tai Ching 21 (Chinese: 大慶21號): The last radio transmission from the Tai Ching 21, a fishing vessel, was made on 28 October 2008. The boat was found empty on 9 November 2008 near Kiribati. Its lifeboat and three life rafts were missing. The abandoned 50 ton Taiwanese vessel had been gutted by fire several days previously. No mayday call was received. A search of 21,000 square miles (54,000 km^{2}) of the Pacific Ocean north of Fiji by a US Air Force C-130 Hercules and a New Zealand Air Force P-3 Orion found no trace of the Taiwanese captain (顏金港 Yán Jīn-gǎng) or crew (18 Chinese, 6 Indonesians, and 4 Filipinos).
- January 2009 – The SV Lunatic: In December 2007 at age 70, Jure Šterk started a journey to sail around the world on his boat Lunatic. He used his amateur radio to communicate, and was last heard from on 1 January 2009. His sailboat Lunatic was spotted on 26 January, approximately 1,000 nmi (1,900 km) off the coast of Australia. The boat appeared damaged and there was no sign of Jure Šterk on deck. Three months later, on 30 April 2009 the sailboat was found adrift by the crew of the science vessel RV Roger Revelle, 500 miles (800 km) southeast at 32° 18.0' S 091° 07.0' E. The sails were torn and there was no one on board. After boarding they found that the last log entry had been made on 2 January 2009.
- 20 March 2012 – The MV Ryou-Un Maru, a fishing vessel, was washed away from its mooring in Aomori Prefecture, Japan during the Tōhoku earthquake and tsunami. It was assumed sunk with no crew aboard, but a year later, it was found drifting about 150 nautical miles (280 km; 170 mi) off the coast of Haida Gwaii, British Columbia, Canada. The United States Coast Guard sank it with 25 mm cannon fire on 5 April 2012.
- 19–20 June 2012 – The T.T. Zion, a private yacht, was grounded on Fort Lauderdale Beach around 1:15 a.m. on 20 June, with its navigation lights on and engines still running. The vessel appeared sea worthy but a broken tie-bar could have caused steering problems. Items belonging to owner Guma Aguiar were found on board, but no sign of him or any other passenger was found.
- February 2013 – The MV Lyubov Orlova, a former Soviet cruise ship, was being towed to a scrapyard in the Caribbean when a cable snapped, setting her adrift in international waters, one day after leaving St John's, Newfoundland, Canada. On 4 February 2013 she was found approximately 250 nautical miles (460 km; 290 mi) east of St John's (approximately 50 nautical miles (93 km; 58 mi) outside Canada's territorial waters) and drifting in a northeasterly direction. The crew did not pursue the vessel due to safety concerns. Some news reports claimed it was adrift and populated with "cannibal rats".
- 2011–ongoing – Every year the remains of dozens of ghost ships reach Japanese waters; the ships are typically ill-equipped small wooden boats believed to be fishing for North Korea. Some boats were found empty but at least 25 people have been found in advanced states of decomposition, probably dead from starvation or exposure. At least some of the crude fishing vessels are believed to have been owned and operated by the Korean People's Army.
- 31 January 2016 – The Sayo: Manfred Fritz Bajorat of Germany was found dead in his private yacht, which was adrift in the Philippine Sea. His mummified body was found slumped on a desk by crew from the racing yacht LMAX Exchange. The yacht was re-discovered on 25 February 2016. An autopsy found Bajorat had died of a heart attack approximately one week before being found, and sea conditions preserved the body.
- October 2018 – The MV Alta was abandoned due to engine failure in October 2018. The United States Coast Guard rescued the crew and abandoned the ship in the Atlantic Ocean. It drifted for one and a half years until it ran aground near Ballycotton, County Cork on the coast of Ireland during Storm Dennis.
- January 2021 – The Yong Yu Sing No. 18 was discovered adrift near Midway Island with all crew and a lifeboat missing, and with damage from what appeared to be a collision.
- April 2024 – Fishermen found an unnamed fishing ship on the Caeté River in the region of Bragança, Pará, Brazil, near the Amazon Delta, presumably having departed from Mauritania. It is assumed that they were African migrants heading to the Canary Islands. The ship probably got lost at sea, going adrift on the South Equatorial Current. Its last sighting at Mauritania was in January 2024, so presumably the voyage lasted for 3 months. All of the 9 occupants were found dead. The ship register showed the journey started with 25 crew. It is speculated that the first 16 bodies were thrown overboard by the remaining crewmembers, before they themselves died. The recovered bodies were examined and the cause of death was dehydration and inanition.
- August 2025 – The fishing vessel MV Karolee was found roughly 60 miles southwest of Eureka, California, fully rigged for fishing with safety gear in place, but the operator, Joel William Kawahara, missing. The search covering more than 2,100 square miles was suspended. On August 22 Kawahara's body was found washed up on a beach in Washington State, and was transferred to Clallam County Coroner by a rescue helicopter.
- November 2025 – An overdue 5-metre fishing boat was found drifting off the coast of Whangārei, New Zealand with no sign of the two crew members on board. A body was later recovered from the ocean in the search for the missing crew members.
- March 2026 - Russian LNG tanker MV Arctic Metagaz was struck by Ukrainian drones in the Mediterranean on March 3. The vessel had a large hull breach and was set on fire but did not sink, and two of its remaining four LNG tanks were intact. The vessel was abandoned and began to drift towards Libya, considered to be a dangerous environmental threat. On 26 March the vessel was intercepted 35 nautical miles off the coast of Zuwara and towed out of Libyan waters by the Libyan coast guard. On 1 April salvage efforts were halted due to severe weather and the vessel was abandoned by the Libyan coastguard 105 nautical miles north-northeast of Misrata. On May 4 reports from the Libyan National Army proclaimed that the vessel had been successfully boarded by a salvage team and anchored 8 nautical miles off the coast of Daryanah.

== See also ==
- Ghost town
- List of ghosts
- List of missing ships
