= Maid of England =

Ship

History

Canada
- Name: Maid Of England
- Owner: F. K. Warren
- Port of registry: Lloyd's Registry
- Builder: Omer Blinn
- Commissioned: 1919
- In service: 1919-28
- Out of service: 1928
- Fate: Abandoned at sea (Atlantic Ocean) in 1928

General characteristics
- Tonnage: 690 +
- Length: 174.7
- Beam: 37.6
- Draught: 15.2

Maid of England was a sailing barquentine built in Gross Coques, Digby County, Nova Scotia in 1919 by Omer Blinn. Maid of England was the last square-rigged cargo vessel built in Maritime provinces of Canada. Maid of England was owned by F.K. Warren (of Halifax, Nova Scotia) for nine years, and then later abandoned at sea in 1928.

Maid of England was built in 1919, but did not appear in Lloyd’s registry until the 1920-21 edition. Her official number was 141573. She had one deck and was made from spruce and pine. She had three masts, one foremast rigged square, one amidships, and one in the aft end of the vessel, which is why she is classified as a barquentine. Maid of England was the last of the few Canadian commercial vessels to carry a square rig. Maid of England had an initial gross weight of 751 tonnes, with an acceptable weight range of 563-696 tonnes. However, these specifics had changed to a gross weight of 690 tonnes and an acceptable weight range of 543 – 583 tonnes, in Lloyd’s registry in 1923-24. She was 174.7’ long, had a 37.6’ breadth and was 15.2’ deep.

As the Age of Sail had nearly drawn to a close when Maid of England was built, the building crew was composed of elderly and skilled shipwrights. The half model of Maid of England used was cut by W.R. Huntley (a Parrsboro shipbuilder). The model was later used as a representation for the construction of the "Cumberland Queen," later build by Robinson and Pugsley at Diligent River in 1919.

F. K. Warren had owned a number of ships and had established a marine shipping company in 1896, which is referred to as F. K. Warren LTD, and is still in operation today in Halifax Nova Scotia. Among his ever-growing fleet, Warren also owned Earle V. S., Martha Parsons, Emily Anderson (abandoned at sea in 1919), and Maid of Scotland, which was sunk in a collision. The unfortunate fate of previous ships owned by F. K. Warren make the fate of Maid of England that much more intriguing.
