= Arctic Metagaz =

Russian ghost ship

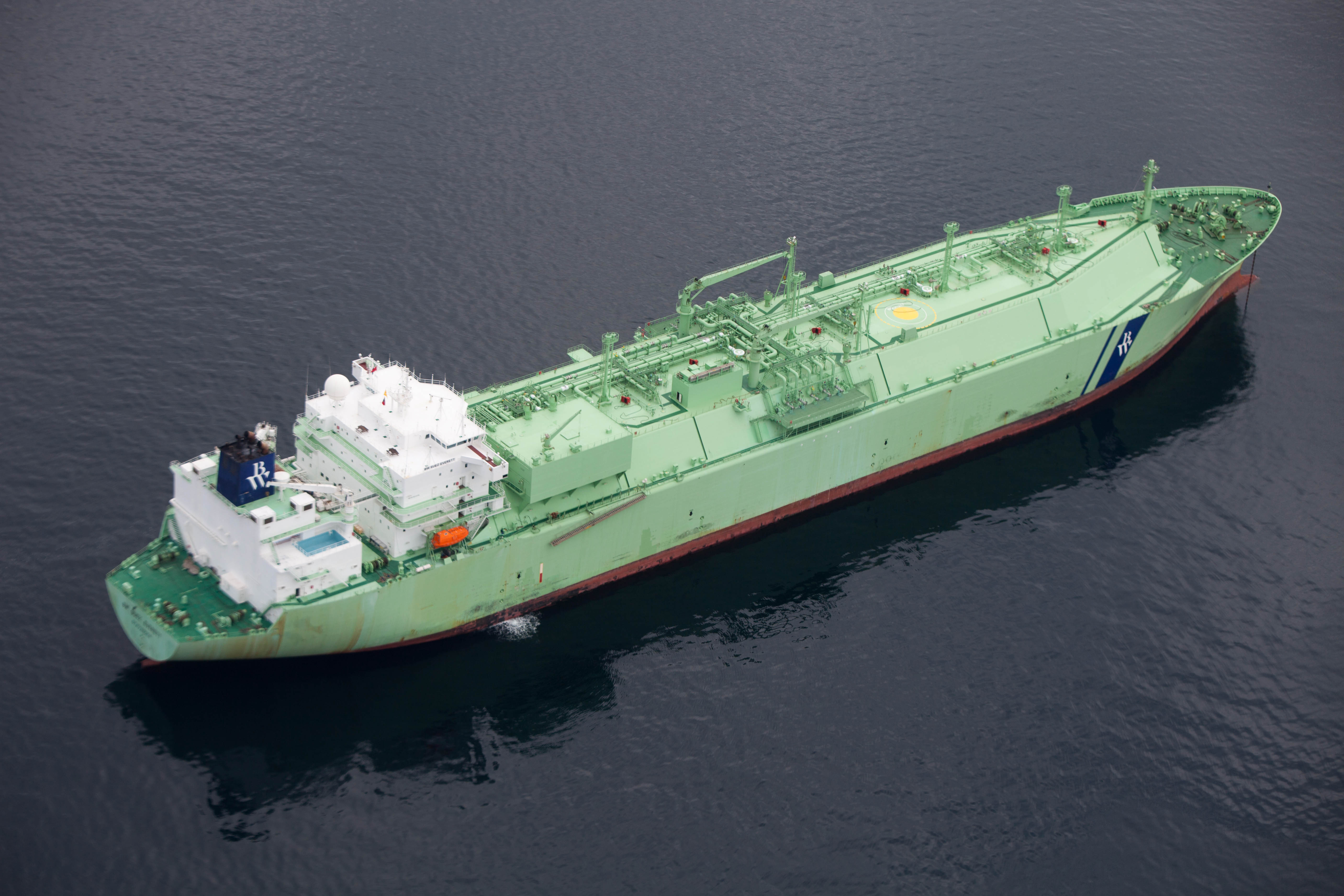
- Arctic Metagaz anchored off Norway in 2012

History
- Name: Arctic Metagaz
- Owner: Lathyrus Shipping Co
- Operator: Ocean Speedstar Solutions (OPC) Pvt Ltd
- Port of registry: Russia
- Builder: Daewoo Shipbuilding & Marine Engineering
- Completed: December 2003
- In service: 2003–2026
- Identification: Call sign: UAFC8; IMO number: 9243148; MMSI number: 273262840
- Status: Derelict; anchored off Benghazi, Libya

General characteristics
- Type: LNG carrier
- Tonnage: 93,844 GT; 28,154 NT; 77,712 DWT
- Length: 277.5 m (910 ft 5 in)
- Beam: 43.4 m (142 ft 5 in)
- Draught: 12.1 m (39 ft 8 in)
- Installed power: 1 × Mitsubishi MS40-2 steam turbine (28,000 kW)
- Propulsion: Single shaft; fixed-pitch propeller
- Speed: 19 knots (35 km/h; 22 mph)
- Capacity: 138,000 m^{3} (870,000 bbl) liquefied natural gas
- Crew: 30

MV Arctic Metagaz is a Russian-flagged LNG carrier that became notable as a ghost ship in early 2026. Built in 2003, the 277-metre vessel had been used to transport energy products from the sanctioned Arctic LNG 2 project to bypass Western restrictions.

On March 3, 2026, while on a voyage in the Mediterranean Sea en route to Egypt, the tanker was struck by a series of Ukrainian drone strikes, a claim that Ukraine has since neither confirmed nor denied. All 30 crew members were safely evacuated but the vessel itself was abandoned. With severe damage the tanker drifted for over two months through the waters of Malta, Italy, and Libya, still laden with 62,000 tonnes of LNG and posing a risk of a major ecological disaster.

As of early May 2026, the vessel has been anchored off the eastern coast of Libya, near Benghazi.

== Description ==
Arctic Metagaz is an LNG carrier designed for the transport of supercooled liquified natural gas (LNG). It is 277.5 metres (910 ft 5 in) in length with a beam of 43.4 metres (142 ft 5 in) and a maximum draught of 12 metres (39 ft 4 in). The vessel has a gross tonnage of 93,844 and a deadweight tonnage of 77,712 tonnes. It is powered by steam turbine engines with a cruising speed of 19 knots (35 km/h; 22 mph). It also has four large, insulated cargo tanks with a total capacity of 138,000 cubic metres (870,000 bbl) of LNG. To maintain the gas in its liquid state, the tanks are designed to keep the cargo at below freezing temperatures, as low as −162 °C (−260 °F).

== History ==
The vessel was built in December 2003 by Daewoo Shipbuilding & Marine Engineering in Geoje, South Korea. It was originally launched under the name Berge Everett and initially owned by Bergesen Worldwide. The vessel operated under the flags of Bermuda and later the Marshall Islands, and between 2003 and 2023 the ship underwent several name changes, which included BW Suez Everett, BW GDF Suez Everett, and Everest Energy.

In 2024 the vessel was sold to undisclosed interests and renamed Arctic Metagaz. It was re-flagged to Russia and managed by companies associated with the Arctic LNG 2 project in the Gyda Peninsula, operating as part of the Russian shadow fleet.

=== 2026 Mediterranean incident ===
On March 3, 2026, Arctic Metagaz was transiting the central Mediterranean Sea, carrying a cargo of 138,000 cubic metres of LNG from Murmansk destined for Egypt. While positioned approximately 50 nautical miles (93 km; 58 mi) east of Malta, a series of powerful explosions occurred on the vessel's main deck and near the engine room, followed by a massive fire. The Russian Ministry of Transport stated that the vessel had been targeted by uncrewed submersible vehicles launched by Ukraine, specifically drones. Ukrainian officials did not claim responsibility but the incident had occurred shortly after the vessel had successfully bypassed several European monitoring zones. All 30 crew members abandoned ship in a lifeboat and were later rescued safely.

Initially Libyan authorities believed the vessel had sunk but it was later discovered Arctic Metagaz remained afloat. She was left adrift with her engines disabled and no fire suppression systems. Due to Russian international sanctions many commercial salvage companies were legally banned from assisting in the vessel's salvage. The ghost ship drifted for eight weeks, considered a global environmental hazard and crossing into SAR zones of Italy and Malta. In April 2026 the Italian Coast Guard warned that the ship was at imminent risk of an explosion. Multiple attempts by Russian tugboats to secure a towline failed due to the ship's damaged hull and heavy swell.

On May 4, reports from the Libyan National Army proclaimed that the vessel had been successfully boarded by a salvage team and anchored 8 nautical miles (15 km; 9.2 mi) off the coast of Daryanah.

== See also ==
- Timeline of the Russo-Ukrainian war (1 January 2026 – present)
