= Lucius Octavius (name) =

Lucius Octavius was a name used for men among the gens Octavia. Lucius was one of the four chief praenomina used by the Octavii, the other three being Gaius, Gnaeus and Marcus.

Lucius Octavius refers to men from several families of the gens Octavia:

- Lucius Octavius (Rufus), consul in 75 BC, son of Gnaeus Octavius the consul in 87 BC, frequently confounded with the jurist Lucius Octavius Balbus;
- Lucius Octavius Ligur, tribune of the Plebs in 82 BC with his brother, Marcus Octavius Ligur;
- Lucius Octavius, legate of Pompey during the war against the pirates in 67 BC;
- Lucius Octavius Naso, benefactor of Lucius Flavius, praetor designatus in 59 BC;
- Lucius Octavius Balbus, eminent legal scholar and judex in the time of Cicero;
- Lucius Octavius, detected in adultery by Gaius Memmius, and punished by him.

== See also ==
- Gaius Octavius (disambiguation)
- Gnaeus Octavius (disambiguation)
- Marcus Octavius
