= Jian Seng =

Ghost ship

The Jian Seng was an 80-metre tanker and ghost ship of unknown origin that was spotted drifting 180km south-west of Weipa, Queensland in the Gulf of Carpentaria by an Australian Coastwatch aeroplane in 2006. The ship was found inoperable and with no crew on board and a broken tow rope, with identifying marks removed, but no signs of illegal activity or violence. The coast guard was never able to determine the ship's origins, and scuttled it in deep waters.

The Jian Seng itself was a medium-sized tanker believed to have been used for refuelling other vessels at sea (a “bunker tanker”). The ship’s name was faintly visible in Chinese lettering on the stern, but no registration papers, flags, or identifying markings were found. Much of the ship’s machinery had been dismantled, including navigation systems and its main engine, rendering it inoperable.

== Apprehension ==
Photographs of the ship were taken and analysed at the Australian Customs Service, which dispatched a patrol boat immediately. The Australian Customs vessel Storm Bay arrived during the night and waited until morning before launching a tender to board the vessel, which was drifting in uncharted waters. There was no sign of recent human activity found aboard, nor any signs that it had been engaged in illegal activity such as poaching or people smuggling.

A spokesman for Australian Customs addressed the news media on 24 March 2006, stating that although they had been unable to obtain documentary evidence of its registration or origin port, materials recovered seemed to indicate the vessel was called the Jian Seng, though the name and identifying features had been painted over.

A large quantity of rice was found on board, leading the boarding party to believe the vessel had probably been used as a resupply ship for fishing boats with food and fuel in waters outside the Australian exclusive economic zone and which had broken tow and drifted to its current position. The boarding party asserted that the vessel had been adrift for an exceptionally long time before being found, and that the engines were inoperable and incapable of being restarted. They also reported that the boat was drifting slowly southwards. It had been extensively stripped, suggesting that it may have been on its way to a scrapyard when its towline broke.

The Storm Bay monitored Jian Seng for several days before a decision was made to tow it to the nearest harbour. A salvage tug towed the ship to Weipa, on Cape York, where oily water which posed an environmental hazard was removed. Since no owner of the ship could ever be located, it was towed to deep water on 21 April 2006 and scuttled.

== Political implications ==
Chris Ellison, Minister for Justice and Customs, claimed that the detection of this vessel illustrates the effectiveness of response in detection of ships breaching Australian borders, alleging it was detected in a remote stretch of Australian waters and photographed by a Customs airplane, which returned to base with the photos whilst a vessel was immediately dispatched. This was challenged by Senator Joseph William Ludwig, claiming that the extraordinary feat was that it was not intercepted earlier, when one considers how far south it had entered into the gulf. The area in which it was found is notorious for illegal Indonesian fishing vessels and for people or drug smuggling operations. Senator Ludwig alleged that Australian Customs had claimed this was a region they had specifically been targeting, and then asked how they can hope to intercept illegal fishing boats when a massive tanker was missed for such a potentially long period of time.

== See also ==
- List of ghost ships
- MV Alta
- Mary Celeste
