= Gaius Octavius =

Gaius Octavius may refer to:

- Gaius Octavius (tribune 216 BC) (fl. 216 BC), military tribune
- Gaius Octavius (father of Augustus) (c. 100–59 BC), praetor in 61 BC
- Augustus or Gaius Octavius Thurinus (63 BC–AD 14), first Roman Emperor
- Gaius Octavius Laenas, curator of the aqueducts in Rome (AD 34–38)
- Gaius Octavius Lampadio, ancient Roman
- Gaius Octavius Appius Suetrius Sabinus, senator and consul (214 and 240)

== See also ==
- Gaius
- Gnaeus Octavius (disambiguation)
- Lucius Octavius (name)
- Marcus Octavius
- Octavius (disambiguation)
