= Simon Reed (disambiguation) =

Simon Reed is a sports commentator.

Simon Reed may also refer to:

- Simon Reed, captain of the Lady Lovibond
- Simon Reed, comic book artist with Simon Bisley for Full Circle

== See also ==
- Simon Read (disambiguation)
- Simone Reed, participant in Big Brother (British series 18)
