= Ourang Medan =

Unconfirmed ghost ship of the 1940s

SS Ourang Medan was a reported ghost ship and proposed urban legend of the 1940s. The vessel was supposedly discovered adrift after briefly broadcasting distress messages. The ships that responded to the SOS were reported to have discovered all the crew dead with their eyes open and their faces frozen in shock, as if they were witnessing a horrific scene. As the rescue crews subsequently prepared to tow the Ourang Medan to port, a fire reportedly broke out in the hold resulting in its eventual sinking, hiding it and its mysteries forever.

The most prominent version of the story places the vessel in the Dutch East Indies (modern Indonesia) in the waters of the Straits of Malacca, while other versions of the tale place the vessel around the Marshall Islands or Solomon Islands. The story was initially reported in Italy in 1940 and in England later that same year, before similar stories were repeated in 1948 and later again in 1952. The inability of researchers to identify the vessel in any official records, along with the inconsistent reporting of the location, and other details that change from version to version, has led to speculative coverage in mystery publications such as the Fortean Times.

== SS Ourang Medan ==
The word Ourang (also written Orang) is Malay or Indonesian for 'man' or 'person', whereas Medan is the largest city on the Indonesian island of Sumatra, giving an approximate translation of 'man of Medan'. Accounts of the ship's accident have appeared in various books and magazines, mainly within Forteana. Their factual accuracy and even the ship's existence, however, are unconfirmed, and details of the vessel's construction and history appear to be undocumented. Searches for any official registration or accident investigation recorded have proven unsuccessful.

== Story ==
The 1940 version of the story told of a distress signal being sent out in an area south of the Solomon Islands. The first received stated "SOS from the steamship Ourang Medan. Beg ships with shortwave wireless get touch doctor. Urgent." This was followed by "Probable second officer dead. Other members crew also killed. Disregard medical consultation. SOS urgent assistance warship." After giving her position, the final message received was an incomplete phrase "crew has ... ". Vessels responding to the Ourang Medan received no reply. The 1940 version of the story describes rescue vessels approaching the ship listing in the water, and upon boarding locating multiple crew dead at their posts. As they ventured further into the ship, explosions were reportedly heard and so the rescuers abandoned the ship, and watched it subsequently go ablaze and sink into the Pacific.

By 1948, the story was embellished with further details. According to one version of the story, at some point in or around June 1947, two American vessels navigating the Straits of Malacca, the City of Baltimore and the Silver Star, picked up several distress messages from the nearby Dutch merchant ship Ourang Medan. (Some accounts state only a year for the purported event; other sources such as Vincent Gaddis, list the approximate date as early February 1948.)

A radio operator aboard the troubled vessel is reported to have sent the following message in Morse code: "S.O.S. from Ourang Medan * * * We float. All officers including the captain, dead in chartroom and on the bridge. Probably whole of crew dead * * *." After a few more incoherent dots and dashes, the words "I die." were received. No further communications were received. When the Silver Star crew eventually located and boarded the apparently undamaged Ourang Medan in an attempt at rescue, the ship was found littered with corpses (including the carcass of a dog), with the dead bodies found sprawled on their backs, the frozen (and allegedly badly-frightened) faces of the deceased upturned to the sun above with mouths gaping open and eyes staring straight ahead, with the corpses resembling horrible caricatures. No survivors were located and no visible signs of injuries on the dead bodies were observed. Just as the ship was to be prepared for a tow by the Silver Star to a nearby port, a fire then suddenly broke out in the ship's No. 4 cargo-hold, forcing the boarding party to hastily evacuate the doomed Dutch freighter, thus preventing any further investigations from being carried out. Soon after, the Ourang Medan was witnessed exploding before finally sinking.

Some versions of the story attribute further details to the sole survivor, an unnamed German, of the Ourang Medan crew, who swam to safety, and was subsequently found by an Italian missionary and natives on Taongi Atoll in the Marshall Islands. The man, before perishing, tells the missionary that the ship was carrying a badly stowed cargo of oil of vitriol, and that most of the crew perished because of the poisonous fumes escaping from broken containers. According to the story, the Ourang Medan was sailing from an unnamed small Chinese port to Costa Rica, and deliberately avoided the authorities.

== Hypotheses ==
=== Unsecured hazardous materials cargo ===
Bainton and others hypothesize that Ourang Medan might have been involved in smuggling operations of chemical substances such as a combination of potassium cyanide and nitroglycerin or even wartime stocks of nerve agents. According to these theories, sea water would have entered the ship's hold, reacting with the cargo to release toxic gases, which then caused the crew to succumb to asphyxia or poisoning. Later, the sea water would have reacted with the nitroglycerin, causing the reported fire and explosion.

Another theory is that the ship was transporting tabun, a nerve gas which the Japanese military had been storing in China during the war, and which was handed over to the U.S. military at the end of the war. No U.S. ship could transport it as it would leave a paper trail. It was therefore loaded onto a non-registered ship for transport to the U.S. or an island in the Pacific.

=== Carbon monoxide poisoning ===
Gaddis puts forward the theory that an undetected smouldering fire or malfunction in the ship's boiler system might have been responsible for the shipwreck. Escaping carbon monoxide (CO) would have caused the deaths of all aboard, with the fire slowly spreading out of control, leading to the vessel's ultimate destruction.

== Contemporaneous coverage ==
The earliest iteration of the story occurs in Il Piccolo, the local newspaper of Trieste, in a series of I drammi del mare ('dramas of the sea') written by Silvio Scherli in October 1940. Scherli was a maritime radio operator and freelance journalist.

A month later, contemporaneous reports of the incident appeared in the British press: The Daily Mirror and the Yorkshire Evening Post both carried stories on it, using material attributed to the Associated Press. These initial reports placed the ship in the proximity of the Solomon Islands; they omit the rescue vessels' names; and the SOS messages differ from later reports. The origin of the story is given as the Associated Press, and reported from Trieste in Italy – but attributed to a Merchant Marine Officer.

In 1948, a series of three articles appeared in the Dutch-Indonesian newspaper De locomotief: Samarangsch handels – en advertentie-blad: February 3, 1948, with two photographs duplicated from the Il Piccolo article; February 28, 1948; and March 13, 1948. The source for these stories is given as Silvio Scherli of Trieste. They introduce details of the incident not previously reported in the 1940s versions, including: significantly altered SOS messages; and the addition of the surviving sailor who, on his deathbed, tells a missionary about the events – who subsequently recounted them to Scherli. The Dutch newspaper concludes with a disclaimer:

This is the last part of our story about the mystery of the Ourang Medan. We must repeat that we don't have any other data on this "mystery of the sea". Nor can we answer the many unanswered questions in the story. It may seem obvious that the entire story is a fantasy, a thrilling romance of the sea. On the other hand, the author, Silvio Scherli, assures us of the authenticity of the story.

In October 10, 1948, the story was published in The Albany Times of Albany, New York and references its original source as the Dutch newspaper Elsevier's Weekly. The story was repeated in the May 1952 issue of the Proceedings of the Merchant Marine Council, published by the United States Coast Guard.

Silvio Scherli is said to have produced a report on Trieste "Export Trade" on September 28, 1959.

== Skepticism ==
Several authors note their inability to find any mention of the case in Lloyd's Register of American and Foreign Shipping. Furthermore, no registration records for a ship by the name of Ourang Medan could be located in various countries, including the Netherlands. While author Roy Bainton states that the identity of the Silver Star, reported to have been involved in the failed rescue attempt, has been established with a high probability, the complete lack of information on the sunken ship itself has given rise to suspicion about the origins and credibility of the account. Ships logs for the Silver Star did not show a record of any such rescue attempt. Bainton and others have put forward the possibility that accounts of, among others, the date, location, names of the ships involved, and circumstances of the accident might have been inaccurate or exaggerated, or that the story might be completely fictitious.
