= Bel Amica =

2006 ghost ship off Italy

Bel Amica is a ghost ship discovered off the coast of the Mediterranean island of Sardinia near Punta Volpe on 24 August 2006. The Italian Coast Guard discovered the ship with no crew on board. The coast guard boarded the vessel and steered her away from the rocks and shallow waters she was drifting towards. Once aboard, they discovered a half-eaten meal of Egyptian food, French maps of North African seas, a pile of clothes, and a flag of Luxembourg.

The ship has been described as a "classic style" schooner never seen in Italy before. The investigation found that she had never been registered in Italy nor any other country. The only identification aboard the ship was a wooden tablet or "plaque" as described in some papers that read Bel Amica, a likely misspelling of "Beautiful Friend" (the phrase should say "Bell'Amica" to read properly in modern Italian).

Shortly after the original reports, Italian newspapers reported the owner of the ship had been found. Franc Rouayrux, from Luxembourg, was identified as the owner of the vessel. The boat had been left anchored in deep water for somewhat nebulous reasons, and Rouayroux stated that he had expected to return to the yacht after going home to address an emergency. The Italian press suggested that this may have been an attempt to avoid steep taxation of luxury vessels.

Many reports at the time identified Bel Amica as a schooner. This term is frequently associated with sailing ships from the pre-steamship era; however, it is simply a technical name for the layout of the sails. Schooners of many sizes are in current production. The misidentification of this modern yacht as an antique ship deepened the mystery and probably contributed to the brief international interest at the time.
