= High Aim 6 =

Taiwanese ghost ship

High Aim 6 (Chinese : Haian liuhao 海安六號) was a Taiwanese fishing vessel which left the port of Liuchiu in southern Taiwan on 31 October 2002, and was then found without its crew, drifting in Australian waters, on 8 January 2003. The owner of the ship, Tsai Huang Shueh-er, spoke last with the ship's captain in December 2002. The vessel was registered in Taiwan and flew under an Indonesian flag.

While the only member of the Indonesian crew who could be tracked down admitted that the captain Chen Tai-cheng (陳泰成) and the engineer Lin Chung-li (林中立) had been murdered, what happened exactly and the motive for mutiny remains unclear.

== Initial discovery ==
The vessel was found drifting in calm waters approximately 80 nautical miles (150 km; 92 mi) east of Rowley Shoals inside the Australian Exclusive Economic Zone. The crew was missing. There has been no explanation for their disappearance. There was no evident reason for the abandonment: no signs of distress were found, and the crew's personal effects remained on board. The High Aim 6 had plenty of fuel and provisions and no sign of a struggle could be found. Initial concerns that the ship had been carrying illegal immigrants were dismissed when the contents of the hold proved with a cargo to be rotting fish. The ship was equipped for long-line fishing.

When the ship was first sighted five days before being boarded, its motor was running and it was underway. At the time of boarding, the engine was dead and the rudder was locked.

The High Aim 6 was towed to Broome, While moored at Broome, subsequent forensic examination was conducted. Despite a search of some 7,300 nautical miles (13,500 km; 8,400 mi), no trace of crew was ever found.

== Probable mutiny ==
According to the Central News Agency, at the date of January 15 - after the boat was discovered - local calls were still being made from Indonesia using the cell phone of the boat engineer. After checking the call records, the Taiwanese police deemed a mutiny probable. Recruiting agencies in Indonesia were contacted and it appeared that 10 men had been recruited. The Indonesian police arrested the only member who could be tracked down, in the province of North Sulawesi. According to his declaration, members of the crew had killed the captain and the engineer on December 8 and then proceeded to go back to their homeland. He never gave a clear explanation as to the motive and the details of the affair.

In the previous year, in a similar event, the Taiwanese fishing boat Hairisheng 6 (海日盛六號) was discovered empty by an Indonesian military boat. Three crew members were subsequently arrested (of a total of 10) and confessed to the murder of the captain and the engineer.

== Final disposition of the ship ==
High Aim 6 was deemed abandoned and was handed over to the Australian Fisheries Management Authority for disposal. AFMA's efforts to find a suitable home for the vessel ended with the conclusion that it should be sunk for use as a fish habitat.

The ship was sat beached on the sand beach of Broome for about a year, becoming a popular tourist attraction. It was not sunk offshore as expected by local sport fishermen. Locals had hoped the ship would be dragged offshore and scuttled to be used as a dive wreck, but in October 2004, the ship was ripped apart by heavy equipment, and the ship was transferred to dump trucks and hauled to the local landfill for a final resting place a year after its discovery.
