= Storm Dennis =

February 2020 extratropical cyclone

Storm Dennis Mid-February 2020 North American storm complex
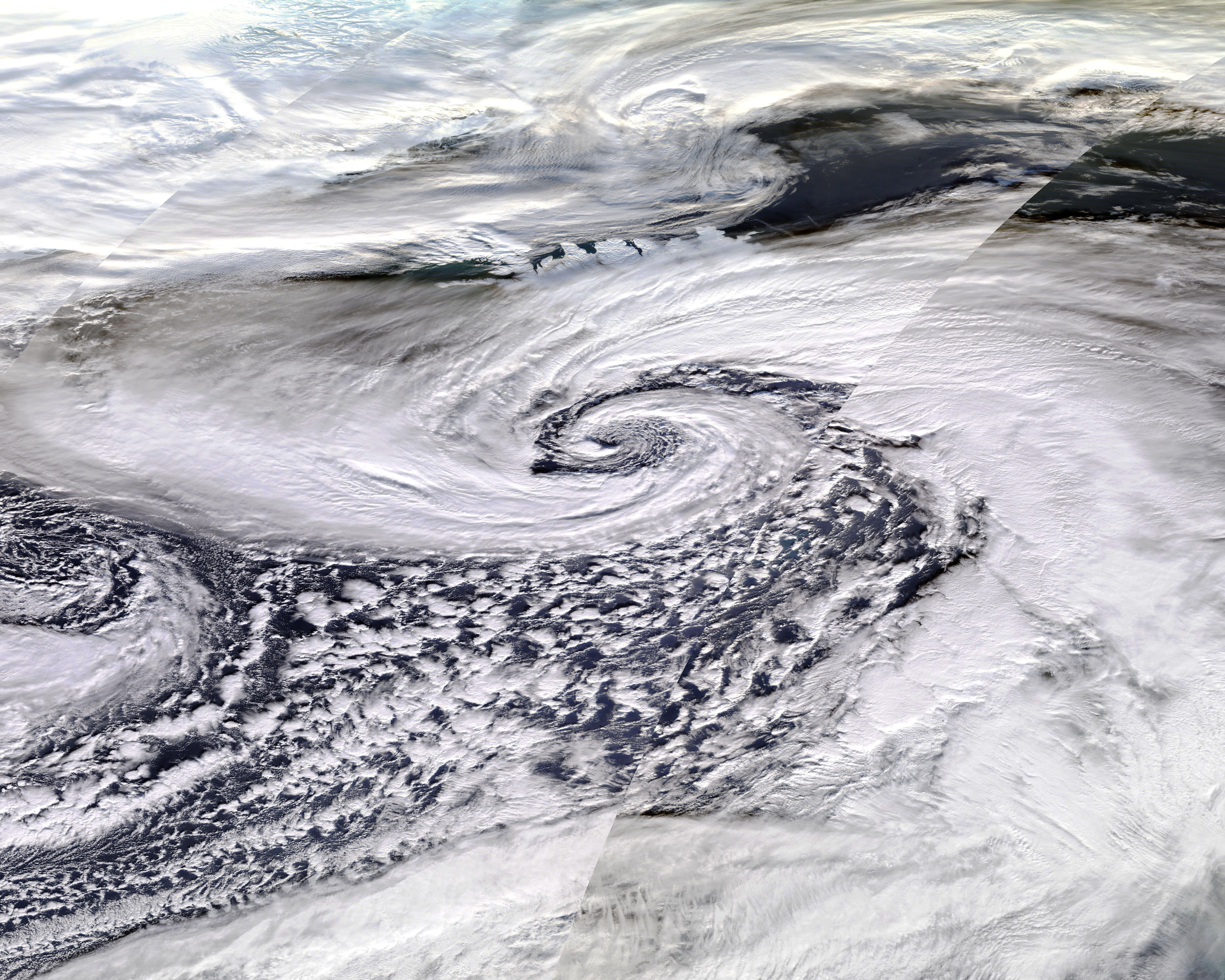
- Storm Dennis at its near-record peak intensity on 15 February, spanning most of the North Atlantic

Meteorological history
- Formed: 11 February 2020
- Dissipated: 18 February 2020

Extratropical cyclone
- Highest gusts: 142 mph (229 km/h) Stokksnes, Iceland: 14 February 2020
- Lowest pressure: 920 hPa (mbar); 27.17 inHg

Overall effects
- Fatalities: 7
- Areas affected: United Kingdom, Republic of Ireland, Iceland, Norway, Sweden, Netherlands
- Power outages: 26,000+
- Part of the 2019–20 European windstorm season

Storm Dennis (Note: The system received numerous other names in different countries, including Winter Storm Mabel in the United States and Canada (unofficially named by The Weather Channel) and Cyclone Victoria in German-speaking countries (named by the Free University of Berlin)) was a European windstorm which, in February 2020, became one of the most intense extratropical cyclones ever recorded, reaching a minimum central pressure of 920 millibars (27.17 inches of mercury). The thirteenth named storm of the 2019–20 European windstorm season, Dennis affected the Republic of Ireland and the United Kingdom less than a week after Storm Ciara, exacerbating the impacts from that storm amidst ongoing flooding in the latter country.

A precursor low over North America was named by The Weather Channel, which unofficially named it Mabel, moving eastwards across the southern United States. After bringing blizzard conditions to the Midwest and heavy snowfall to New England, the cyclone emerged into the north Atlantic, where it redeveloped into Storm Dennis, officially named by the Met Office on 11 February – Dennis subsequently underwent explosive cyclogenesis on 13 February, reaching its near-record low pressure south of Iceland the following day. Destructive winds and heavy rainfall moved south into the British Isles over the weekend of 15–16 February as Dennis passed north of Scotland; the storm subsequently began to weaken, making landfall in Norway the following day.

At least five fatalities have been recorded from Storm Dennis as of 18 February in the United Kingdom. Heavy rainfall caused severe flooding in Wales and southern England, with many rivers reaching their highest levels ever recorded. Further flooding was also reported in areas of northern England that had been inundated by Storm Ciara the previous weekend.

== Meteorological history ==
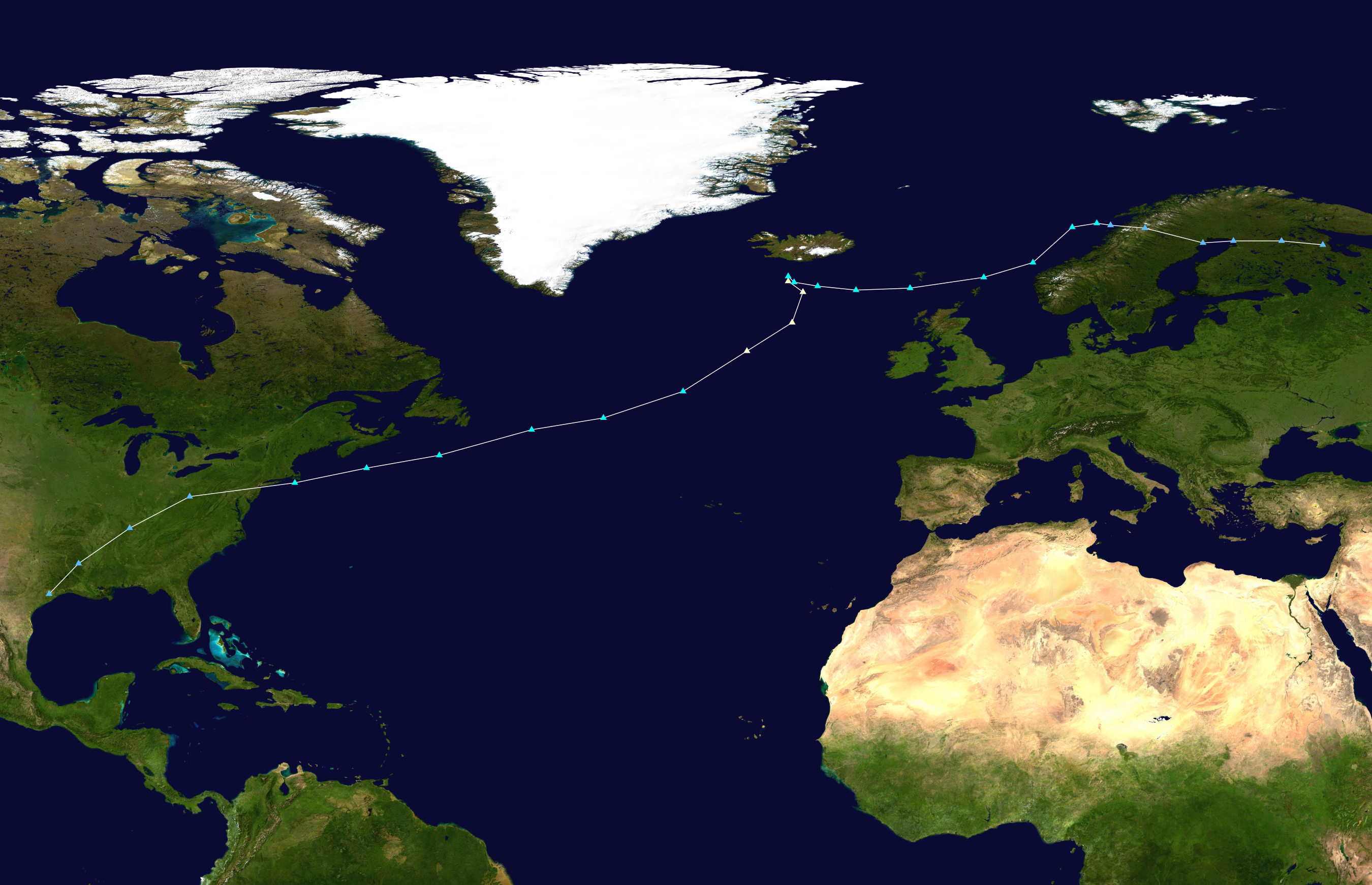
Map plotting the track of the storm according to the Ocean Prediction Center Map key Saffir–Simpson scale Tropical depression (≤38 mph, ≤62 km/h) Tropical storm (39–73 mph, 63–118 km/h) Category 1 (74–95 mph, 119–153 km/h) Category 2 (96–110 mph, 154–177 km/h) Category 3 (111–129 mph, 178–208 km/h) Category 4 (130–156 mph, 209–251 km/h) Category 5 (≥157 mph, ≥252 km/h) Unknown Storm type Tropical cyclone Subtropical cyclone Extratropical cyclone, remnant low, tropical disturbance, or monsoon depression

Alongside their meteorological companions in the United States, the Met Office in the United Kingdom also began issuing warnings for the storm well in advance, based on strong certainty in forecasts across weather models – Storm Dennis was officially named on 11 February, while it was still located over the southern United States and before any meaningful intensification had yet taken place; at the same time, severe weather warnings were issued across the United Kingdom for the coming weekend.

The cyclone moved across the Great Lakes and into New England before exiting into the north Atlantic by midday on 13 February. After drifting northeastwards parallel to the coast of Atlantic Canada, Dennis accelerated into the open Atlantic on 14 February, undergoing explosive intensification at the same time. The central pressure of Dennis dropped by 84 millibars over 54 hours, an incredibly fast rate for an extratropical cyclone. By 15 February, as Dennis stalled to the south of Iceland, it had a near-record central low pressure of 920 mb (27 inHg) and winds gusting up to 140 mph (230 km/h) offshore. After performing a tight anticyclonic loop off the coast of Iceland under the influence of the Fujiwhara effect from a second, weaker low to the west, Dennis accelerated briskly southeastwards and began to weaken, with the centre passing north of Scotland on 16 February before making landfall in Norway on 17 February.

== Preparations ==
=== Weather warnings in the United Kingdom ===
Weather warnings in the United Kingdom are issued by the Met Office.

Warning severity	Event	Date	Areas affected
Red	Rain	15 February	South Wales
Amber	Rain	16 February	South Wales, Welsh Mountains, Central Northern England, parts of South East England, parts of Cornwall
Amber	Rain	15 February	South Wales, Welsh Mountains, Central Northern England, Southern Scotland, parts of Cornwall
Yellow	Wind	17 February	North Wales, Northern England, Northern Ireland, Scotland
Yellow	Wind	16 February	All areas
Yellow	Rain and wind	15 February	England, Wales, Northern Ireland, Southern and Central Scotland

A red weather warning for rain, the highest level, was issued for parts of South Wales on 15 February as a result of persistent heavy rainfall across already-saturated river valleys; it was the first red warning of any kind issued by the Met Office since Storm Emma in 2018, and the first red warning issued specifically for rain since December 2015. The warning covered the Welsh capital, Cardiff, and eight surrounding council areas: Blaenau Gwent, Bridgend, Caerphilly, Merthyr Tydfil, Neath Port Talbot, southern Powys, Rhondda Cynon Taf and Torfaen.

== Impact ==
=== United Kingdom ===
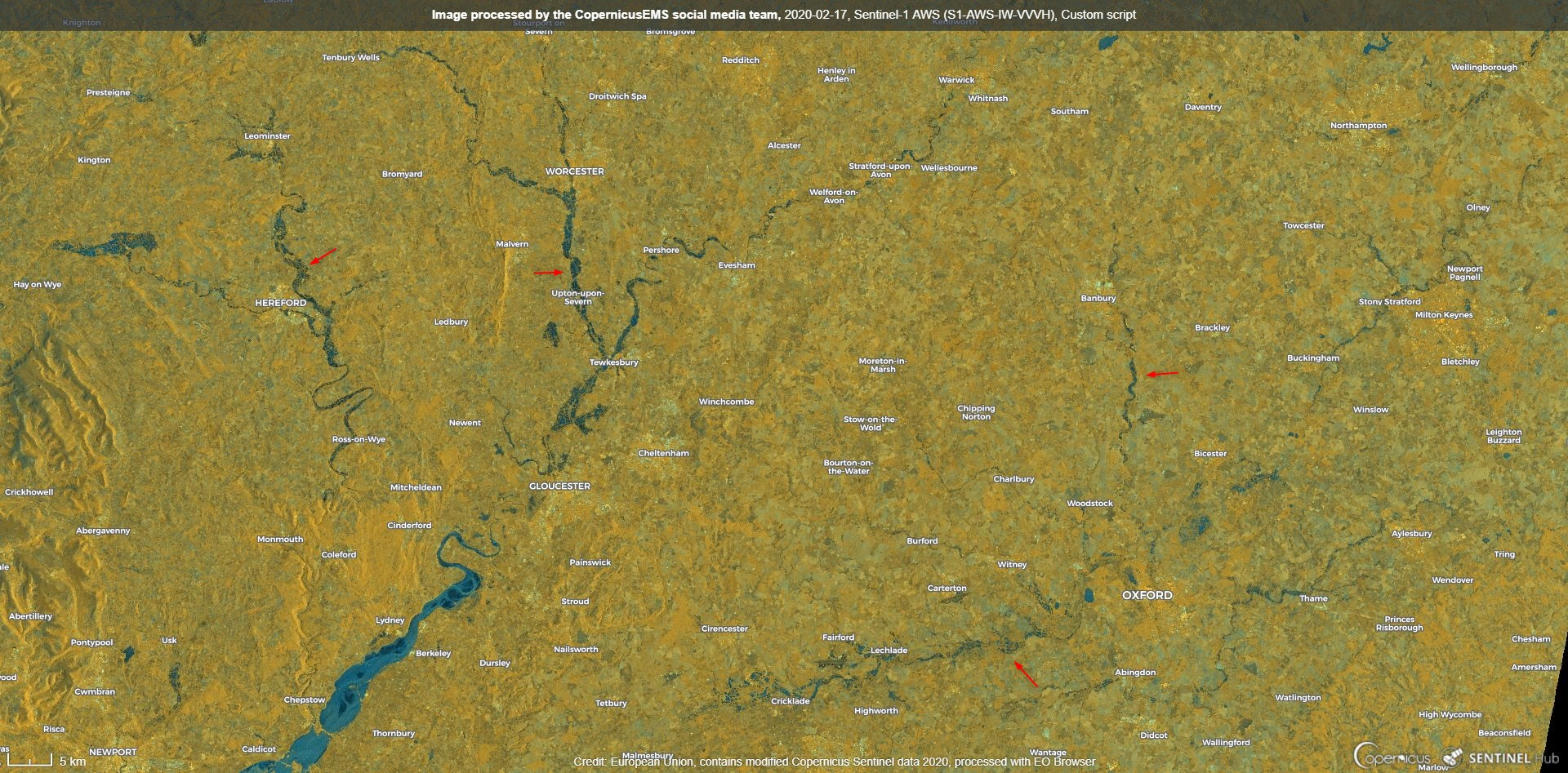
Satellite image of south-central England and south-east Wales showing flooding, 17 February 2020

In the UK, two people were killed on 15 February: a man was found dead hours after falling overboard from a tanker and a teenager died after entering the sea in Kent. On 16 February, a man was found dead in a flooded river near Trebanos, Wales. The army was deployed to assist in rescue efforts.

The UK Met Office issued a red weather warning, meaning "danger to life", for prolonged periods of heavy rain in south Wales on 16 February until 11:00 GMT, covering nine council areas including Neath Port Talbot. A fourth person, a woman, went missing and was later found dead, in Wales. A fifth person, a woman, died when she was swept away by floodwater near Tenbury Wells in Worcestershire.

High winds caused disruption to ferry services across Scotland and England. The Caledonian MacBrayne ferry MV Caledonian Isles was filmed lurching violently from side to side while attempting to dock at Ardrossan on a sailing from the Isle of Arran; the ferry crew were praised after eventually bringing the ship into port successfully in the difficult conditions. The ship subsequently made a delayed and "choppy", but otherwise uneventful, return journey to Arran. Red Funnel services from Southampton to East Cowes on the Isle of Wight were adversely affected on 15 February, forcing passengers to stay onboard one of the ROPAX vessels after sea conditions became too treacherous both for the vessel to disembark or proceed onward. Passengers were stuck on the ferry for 14 hours and the journey (which normally takes approximately an hour) wasn't completed until 9:15 am the following morning.

In Northern Ireland, high winds caused some disruption. The Foyle Bridge in Derry was closed to high-sided vehicles, and a temporary speed restriction was imposed to all other vehicles. On Gilnahirk Road in east Belfast, numerous shop fronts collapsed onto the pavement below as a result of high winds; there were no injuries.

=== Ireland ===
Met Éireann issued a total of six yellow and orange wind and rain warnings spanning from Saturday morning until the early hours of Monday. At the peak, a status orange wind warning was active between 10am and 10pm Sunday for nine counties: Donegal, Leitrim, Sligo, Mayo, Galway, Clare, Limerick, Kerry and Cork. The yellow warnings were extended until 3am on Monday.

As a result of the storm, an abandoned vessel named MV Alta was washed up high on rocks in Ballycotton, County Cork. The vessel had spent over a year drifting at sea since October 2018 after its crew were rescued by a USCG rescue team when the ship became disabled en route to Haiti from Greece. An Irish Coast Guard Rescue 117 helicopter was dispatched to the site, which is a Special Area of Conservation. It reported nobody onboard and that it showed no immediate environmental impact to the area.

=== Sweden ===
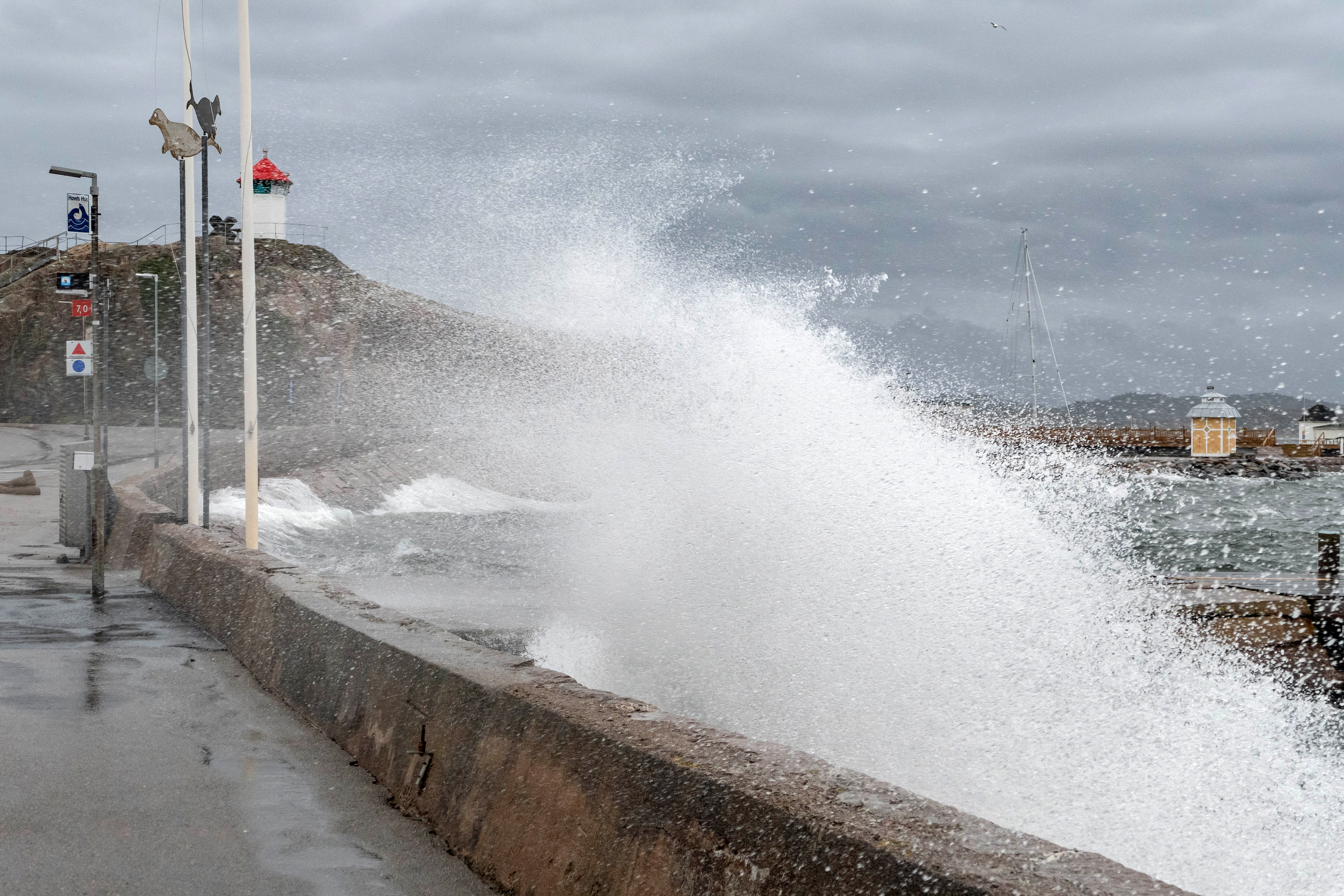
Wave in Lysekil, Sweden, during Storm Dennis

On 16 February 2020, winds of around 70 mph (110 km/h) were recorded on the west coast of Sweden. Class-2-warnings were issued by the Swedish Meteorological and Hydrological Institute. Flooding occurred in areas along the west coast, most notably in Borås. The Uddevalla Bridge was closed, trains on the Gothenburg–Borås and Stenungsund–Uddevalla lines and several ferries on the west coast were cancelled. Trees were felled by the storm, destroying power lines and about 17,000 customers lost power.

On 17 February 2020, new class-1 and 2 warnings were issued for the west coast of Sweden. Flooding of roads and areas close to bodies of water continued and increased, especially around Uddevalla and Älvsborg.

=== The Netherlands ===
On 15 February the KNMI issued a yellow warning for the whole country for potential gusts of up to 60 mph (100 km/h) The peak of the storm hit the Netherlands in the morning with gusts of up to 75 mph (120 km/h). The storm was stronger than expected and caused a lot of damage, because of its strength and because some trees and roofs had been weakened by Storm Ciara a week before.

== Aftermath ==
=== Emergency Protocols ===
Many local councils across the United Kingdom established their emergency protocols to deal with the storm and its aftermath, including Calderdale Metropolitan Borough Council, who activated their Gold Command service with the local emergency services. However, it was later reported that a man in the Todmorden area had been visiting homes in the town while impersonating a Gold Command officer, asking for donations to the Calderdale flood relief fund; the incident was reported by the council to West Yorkshire Police.

=== Political comment ===
Labour shadow environment secretary Luke Pollard criticised Prime Minister Boris Johnson for being absent from areas flooded by Ciara and Dennis and for his failure to convene an emergency Cobra meeting in response to the crisis. George Eustice, the new UK Environment Secretary, responded by saying the floods were one of the first things Johnson talked to him about in the previous week when appointing him to the role, and that he was in Yorkshire the day before, and that the flood defences "were working as intended."

== Highest wind gust per country ==
Country	Gust	Location
United Kingdom	206 km/h	Haroldswick
Ireland	169 km/h	Dundalk
Iceland	230 km/h	Stokksnes
Norway	192 km/h	Sandnessjøen
Sweden	192 km/h	Norrbotten
Finland	195 km/h	Hailuoto
Denmark	146 km/h	Skagen
Germany	173 km/h	Brocken
Belgium	111 km/h	Koksijde
Netherlands	119 km/h	Vlieland
Luxembourg	97 km/h	Wincrange

== See also ==
- 2019 England floods
- Braer Storm
