= Octavius (ship) =

Legendary 18th century ghost ship

History

Great Britain
- Name: Octavius
- In service: Before 1761
- Out of service: 1762
- Fate: Trapped in sea ice, all hands lost, found derelict in 1775

The Octavius was a legendary 18th century ghost ship. According to the story, the three-masted schooner was found west of Greenland by the whaler Herald on 11 October 1775. Boarded as a derelict, the five-man boarding party found the entire crew of 28 below deck: dead, frozen, and almost perfectly preserved.

The captain's body was supposedly still at the table in his cabin, pen in hand (exactly as in the Schooner Jenny legend) with the captain's log in front of him. In his cabin there were also the bodies of a woman, a nude boy covered with a blanket, and a sailor with a tinderbox. The boarding party took only the captain's log before leaving the vessel, because they were unwilling to search it.

The last entry in the log was from 11 November 1762, which meant that the ship had been lost in the Arctic for 13 years. As the log was frozen, it slipped from the binding, leaving only the first and the last few pages in.

== Story ==
The story's supposed background is that the Octavius had left England for the Orient in 1761, and successfully arrived at its destination the following year. The captain gambled on a return through the treacherous and then little known Northwest Passage, with the unfortunate result of trapping the vessel in sea ice north of Alaska; thus, the Octavius had made the Northwest Passage posthumously. The ship was never seen again after its encounter with the Herald (being carried away by the streams and wind in the night after their encounter). The ship's last recorded position while the crew was still alive was 75°N 160°W, about 250 miles (402 kilometers) north of Utqiagvik, Alaska (named as "Point Barrow" in 1825), while the ship was discovered near Greenland.

Similar stories had previously appeared which shared elements of the Octavius story. Throughout the late 1820s, various American newspapers reported on an unnamed frozen ghost ship in Arctic waters. Later stories also named the ship Gloriana.

== Uses in popular culture ==
- This ship and its story is seemingly one of the inspirations for the setting events in Jacques Tardi's graphic novel, The Arctic Marauder (Le démon des glaces), 1974. Set in 1889, a passenger ship named L'Anjou is passing through the Barents Sea when it has a fatal encounter with another called The Iceland Loafer, which has somehow become frozen atop a huge iceberg. When the crew of L´Anjou board the Loafer they find its frozen captain in the cabin, mysteriously pointing to a certain point on a naval map (where they actually are). Immediately afterwards, their ship, L'Anjou is blown up leaving them stranded on the ghost ship.
- The Octavius is featured in a naval mission in the video game Assassin's Creed III, where the main character, Connor Kenway, is searching for clues to the whereabouts of Captain Kidd's lost treasure.
- The Octavius is the theme of the single Octavius by the Japanese visual kei band Zera.

== See also ==
- SS Baychimo – 20th-century ghost ship

== Bibliography ==
- Spunyarn, Tom (1825), "The Ice Ship", The Cincinnati Literary Gazette, no. 24, pp. 187–188 – the story is set in the Baltic, the ship is not named, and no journal is found.
- "Arctic Expedition". Notes and Queries. 4th series. II: 508. 28 November 1868. – the ship is not named and there is no reference to the North-West Passage.
- Raybin Emert, Phyllis. Mysteries of Ships and Planes. New York: Tom Doherty Associates, Inc., 1990. ISBN 0-8125-9427-4 (telling traditional story)
- Ramsay, Raymond H. No longer on the Map. New York: The Viking Press, 1972 (the book tells it the way Vincent Gaddis does in Invisible Horizons: True Mysteries of the Sea, Philadelphia 1965, pp. 105–108. R. H. Ramsay himself adds that he can't guarantee that the story is true, as it has appeared in many sensation-seeking publications, and he himself couldn't trace its origin.)
