= Simon Read =

Simon Read may refer to:

- Simon Read (footballer) in 1989–90 Football Conference
- Simon Read (artist) who worked with Jock McFadyen
- Simon Read, founder of New Star Games

== See also ==
- Simon Reed (disambiguation)
