= Yong Yu Sing No. 18 =

Fishing vessel and ghost ship

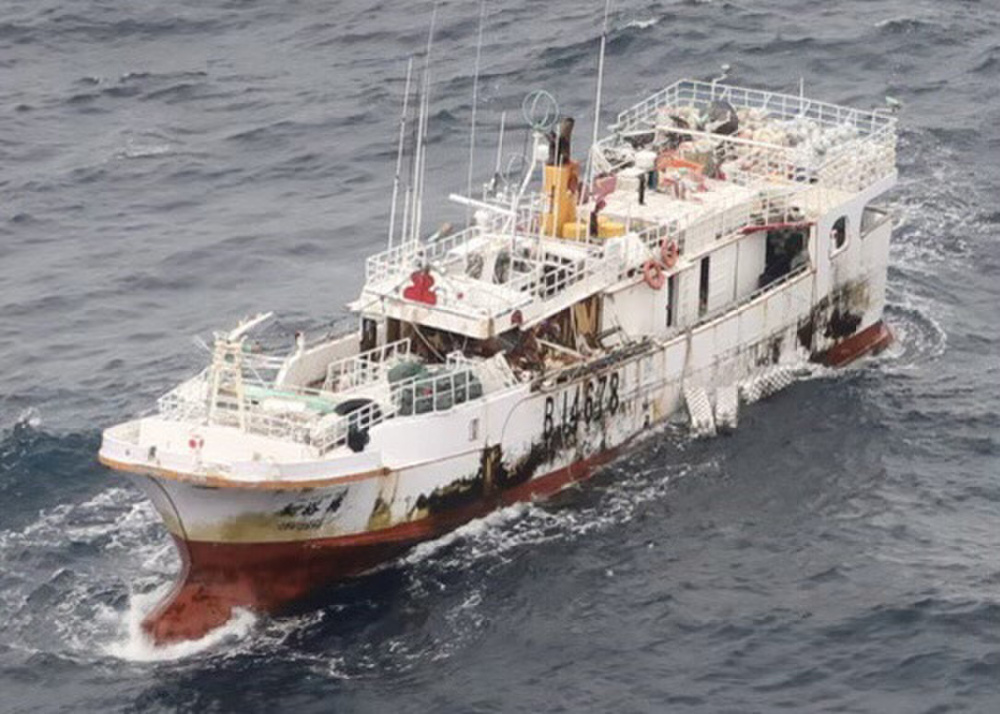
- The vessel after being discovered adrift

History
- Name: Yong Yu Sing No. 18
- Port of registry: Kaohsiung, Taiwan
- Launched: 2001

General characteristics
- Type: Tuna longliner
- Length: 29.6 m (97 ft 1 in)

Yong Yu Sing No. 18 (Chinese: 永裕興18號) was a Taiwanese fishing vessel found adrift and unoccupied near Midway Atoll after losing contact with shore. Taiwanese authorities concluded the crew was lost due to a weather event.

== Vessel ==
The Yong Yu Sing No. 18 is a fishing vessel used for longline tuna fishing. Built in 2001, it is 29.6 metres (97 ft 1 in) long, carries a crew of 15, and is equipped with at least one freezer. Its IMO number is 8546579.

== Discovery ==
The vessel was spotted floating near Midway Atoll on 2 January 2021. Upon further inspection by the United States Coast Guard, a lifeboat was missing, as were all 10 crew. The ship was also damaged in what looked to be a collision. The boat was left adrift in the Pacific Ocean, and the US Coast Guard continued to search for the missing crew. Of the 10 on board when it went missing, nine were of Indonesian nationality and the captain was Taiwanese.

== Investigation ==
The incident was investigated by Taiwan Yilan District Prosecutors Office. They found there were "no signs of physical altercations, blood, or explosions", but there were "multiple structural damages found on the hull [...] indicat[ing] the boat underwent strong wind waves from multiple directions". The case was closed with the conclusion of "no criminal conducts involved". The Liberty Times reported that the most likely cause was that large waves caused the crew to fall into the sea and that murder or piracy is not likely.

== Apparent distress message discovery ==
In July 2025, two workers on a day trip to the Aran Islands, Ireland, reported the discovery of a message in a bottle written in Indonesian and apparently requesting help on behalf of three stranded Yong Yu Sing No. 18 crewmembers. The message stated that the crew had been lost since December 2020 and cited the name of the ship's captain. At the advice of a Reddit community r/beachcombing, the message was turned in to police and was subsequently widely publicized, sparking debate about its authenticity.

== See also ==
- Ghost ship
- List of people who disappeared mysteriously at sea
