= Capt. John Jeffries Burial Marker =

Monument in Atlantic County, New Jersey, US

- Jeffries, Capt. John, Burial Marker
- U.S. National Register of Historic Places
- New Jersey Register of Historic Places
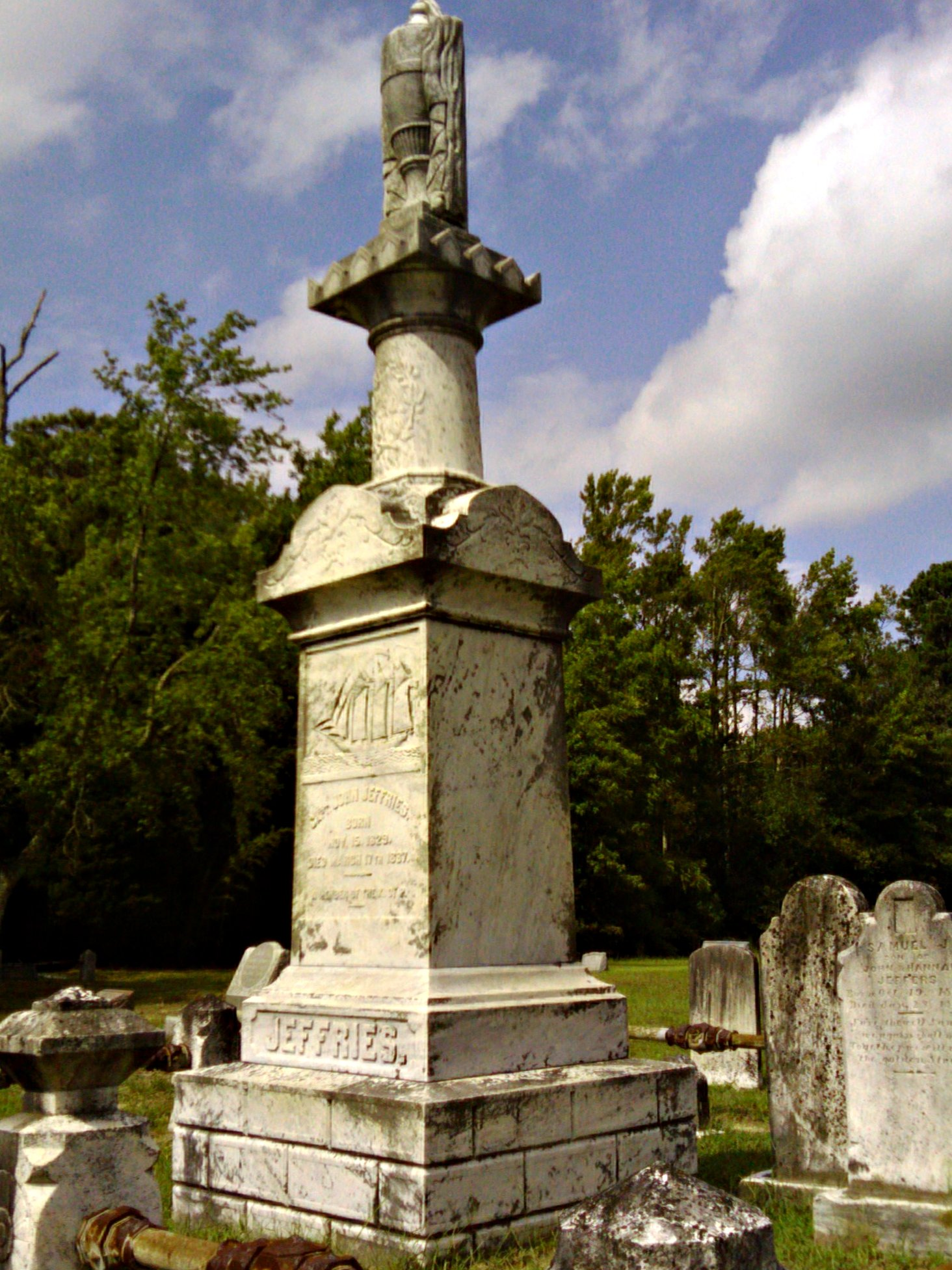
- Captain John Jeffries monument in the Scullville Bible Church cemetery September 5, 2012

- Location within Atlantic County, New Jersey
- Location: Scullville Bible Church Cemetery, 1546 Somers Point Road, Egg Harbor Township, NJ 08234
- Coordinates: 39°20′55.88″N 74°39′39.12″W
- Built: 1887
- NRHP reference No.: 84002511
- NJRHP No.: 414

Significant dates
- Added to NRHP: June 14, 1984
- Designated NJRHP: May 1, 1984

Capt. John Jeffries Burial Marker is a historic burial monument in the cemetery at Scullville Bible Church in Egg Harbor Township, New Jersey, along County Route 559 near Somers Point. It was built in 1887 and added to both the New Jersey Register of Historic Places and the National Register of Historic Places in 1984.

Capt. Jeffries (1829-1887) is known for his association with the ship Twenty One Friends, which, following an incident at sea, floated without crew across the Atlantic Ocean for two years before being claimed and returned to service.

== The Monument ==
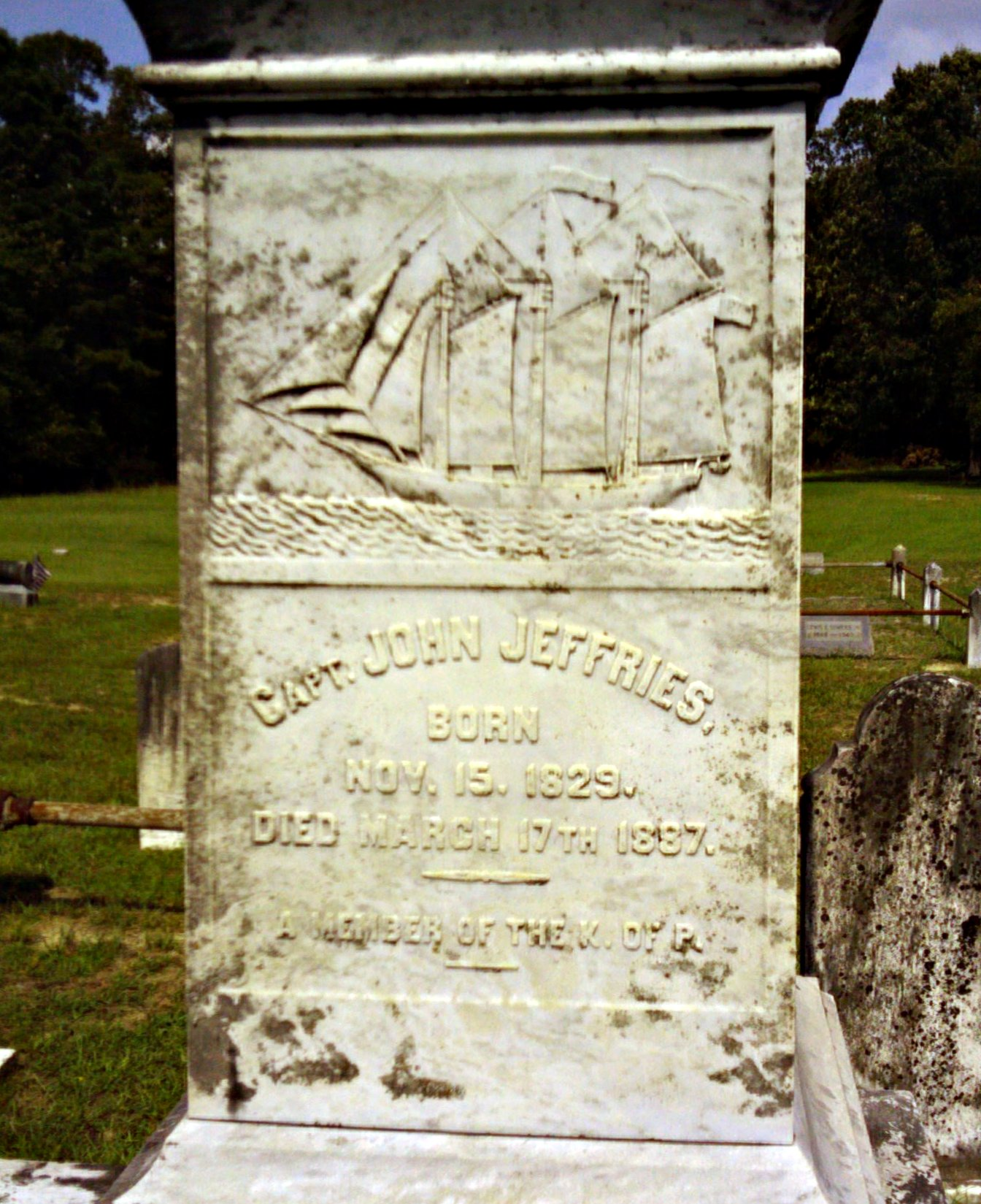
Inscription on Capt. John Jeffries Burial Marker featuring the schooner “Twenty One Friends”.

The Capt. John Jeffries burial marker is approximately 15 feet (4.6 m) tall and the largest marker in the Scullville Bible Church cemetery. The church was built in 1866 and, at the time of his death, was named Palestine Bible Protestant Church. The monument is made of marble and stands on a square brick base approximately 4 feet (1.2 m) on each side. It is located in the Jeffries family plot behind the church, surrounded by other local-area family plots, many of which also date back to the 19th century. The square center section features an inscription, and above that a bas-relief engraving of the ship associated with Jeffries—and the source of his historical fame—the Twenty One Friends. Another smaller section above bears the initials “J.J.” and a draped urn is carved at the top of the monument. The center inscription reads: Capt. John Jeffries. Born Nov. 15, 1829. Died March 17th 1887. A member of the K. of P.

== The Jeffries of Great Egg Harbor ==
The Jeffries family can trace its genealogy back to 18th-century European settlers of Rhode Island. John Jeffries Sr. (1735-1810) from Egg Harbor earned a pension for his service during the American Revolutionary War. The family owned land where Patcong Creek empties into Great Egg Harbor River, and it was here they built a two-storey plantation house. The area became known as Jeffries Landing and was an active port as well as later becoming a popular destination area for bathers.

The settlement that formed inland, north of Jeffries Landing, came to be called Jeffers, also named after the family. In the early 1900s, Jeffers was renamed Scullville, honoring a different family, the Sculls. Currently, where Patcong Creek meets Great Egg Harbor River is still called Jeffries Landing.

John Sr. and his wife, Judiah, had three sons, one of whom was John Jeffries Jr. (1789-1834). In 1819 John Jeffries Jr. was named wharf master at Jeffries Landing, responsible for collecting the wharfage of 30 cents per day to dock there. In 1829, John Jr.’s wife, Isabell, gave birth to John III (1829-1887), who would grow up to become a sea captain.

Capt. John Jeffries III later lived along English Creek, upstream from Jeffries Landing along the Great Egg Harbor River. He was married to Hannah Barrett Jeffries.

=== Variations of the name ===
The family name can be seen spelled different ways; Jeffries, Jeffryes, Jeffrys and Jeffers appear with interchangeability although all reasonably refer to the same family. Some evidence of this can be found within the penned family plot in Scullville (Palestine) Bible Church cemetery. On one side of the Captain, his wife Hannah “Jeffers” is buried and on the other side, his young son Samuel J. “Jeffers”. In between stands the monument to Capt. John “Jeffries”.

== Shipbuilding along Great Egg Harbor River ==
The banks of Great Egg Harbor River, from Mays Landing to Somers Point, were an ideal environment for shipbuilding in the century following the American Revolutionary War due to natural resources in the area. These resources included lumber from pine, oak, and cedar as well as bog ore. The waterways were deep enough for ships up to 2000 tons (1,800 MT). Sawmills and blast furnaces were available in the area. What was not used to build ships was exported in their holds. One shipwright during this time was Capt. Samuel Gaskill of Mays Landing.

=== The Twenty One Friends ===
In 1872, Capt. Gaskill built a three-masted (tern) schooner for Capt. Jeffries. The ship was financed by a group of 21 Philadelphia Quakers and consequently named the Twenty One Friends.

In 1885, returning to Philadelphia with a full load of lumber from Brunswick, Georgia, the Twenty One Friends was rammed by the John D. May off the coast of Cape Hatteras. Capt. Jeffries removed his crew and abandoned the vessel. The ship and cargo were left to the mercy of the sea.

Capt. Jeffries’ concern for the safety of his men was appropriate; however, the Gaskill-made ship proved itself to be more seaworthy than expected. After the collision, the ghost ship was sighted on both sides of the Atlantic over the next two years. It finally came ashore in Ireland, where its cargo was salvaged and it was employed as a fishing vessel. The Twenty One Friends remained in service until 1914.

== Historical significance ==
The Jeffries monument represents not only the life of a sea captain from the Great Egg Harbor River, but also an industry along that river during the 19th century. There are few remaining relics from the marine and shipbuilding industries that mark this region's history during that time.

In addition, the monument has been singled out for its intricate carvings, which helped achieve its NRHP status.

== See also ==
- National Register of Historic Places listings in Atlantic County, New Jersey
- National Historic Preservation Act
