= Diligent River =

Community in Nova Scotia, Canada

- Location in Nova Scotia
- Coordinates: 45°24′46.48″N 64°27′35.21″W
- Country: Canada
- Province: Nova Scotia
- Municipality: Cumberland County
- Time zone: UTC-4 (AST)
- Postal code: B
- Area code: 902

Diligent River is a rural community in Cumberland County, Nova Scotia. West of the town of Parrsboro, it shares its name with a river that makes up its southeast boundary, which itself flows into the Minas Basin. Diligent River is known for its vast blueberry fields that extend from the shoreline into the Cobequid Mountains.

== History ==
Diligent River was founded by United Empire Loyalists in the late 1700s. Among those loyalists was a Lieutenant Elizear Taylor, who along with his family and the other loyalists that had been granted land in the area that would become Diligent River constructed their settlement near the mouth of the Diligent River. In 1785 Governor Parr, the governor of the colony of Nova Scotia, visited the settlement and was impressed by the diligence of the loyalists. Governor Parr then accordingly named the small hamlet Diligent River.
