= Palatine Light =

Apparition in Rhode Island, United States

The Palatine Light is an apparition reported near Block Island, Rhode Island, said to be the ghost ship of a lost 18th-century vessel named the Palatine. The folklore account is based on the historical wreck of the Princess Augusta in 1738, which became known as the Palatine in 19th-century accounts, including John Greenleaf Whittier's poem "The Palatine".

== Historical background ==
The legend is derived from the historical shipwreck of the Princess Augusta at Block Island in 1738. The ship is known from some contemporaneous accounts and from depositions taken from the surviving crew after the wreck, which were discovered in 1925 and reprinted in 1939. The 220-ton British ship Augusta sailed from Rotterdam in August 1738 under Captain George Long and a crew of fourteen, transporting 240 immigrants to English colonies in America. The passengers were German Palatines, natives of the Palatinate region, and as such the ship was described as the "Palatine ship" in contemporaneous documents, which accounts for the later confusion over its name. The ship was heading for Philadelphia; from there, the passengers may have intended to reach a German-owned settlement on the James River in Virginia which attracted some 3,000 of their countrymen.

The Princess Augusta's voyage was beset by terrible luck; the water supply was contaminated, causing a "fever and flux" that killed 200 of the passengers and half the crew, including Captain Long. First mate Andrew Brook took command, as severe storms pushed the ship off course to the north, where the survivors spent three months enduring extreme weather and depleting stores. According to the crew's depositions, Brook forced the passengers to pay for the remaining rations. He evidently tried different routes to Rhode Island and Philadelphia, but the gales pushed the damaged and leaking Augusta to Block Island. It wrecked amid a snowstorm at Sandy Point on the island's northernmost end at 2 p.m. December 27, 1738.

The depositions paint an unsympathetic view of Brook, who rowed to shore with the entire crew while leaving the passengers aboard. The Block Islanders evidently did what they could to help, convincing Brook to let the passengers off the ship the next day and later retrieving their possessions when he left them aboard. They also buried about 20 who died after the wreck; the Block Island Historical Society placed a marker at the site of the "Palatine Graves" in 1947.

The authorities took depositions from the crew, but what happened afterward is unclear. It appears that the crew faced no charges for their actions, and they and most surviving passengers made it to the mainland, after which little is known of them. Two survivors remained on Block Island and settled there. Most accounts indicate that the ship was determined unsalvageable and was pushed out to sea to sink. It may have been set on fire to scuttle it. In some accounts, a woman was driven mad by her suffering, sometimes named as Mary Van Der Line; she was forgotten, according to these accounts, and went down with the ship. However, no remains of the wreck have ever been found, and there is some evidence that the Augusta may have been repaired and sent on to Philadelphia.

Block Island could present a hazard to shipping in the area due to its geography. As a result, it gained a reputation (perhaps undeservedly) as a haven of wreckers who looted wrecked ships. According to some accounts, the locals would go so far as lighting false beacons to encourage wrecks, and even kill the survivors, though the veracity of such stories is debatable.

== Folklore accounts ==
There is a rich oral tradition regarding the event, with many sightings being reported during the late-eighteenth and nineteenth centuries. The legend was immortalized by poet John Greenleaf Whittier in "The Palatine", which faithfully adapts the traditional story in verse. Whittier heard the tale in 1865 from Newport resident Joseph P. Hazard, whose family were key informants for collectors of 19th-century New England folklore. It was printed in the Atlantic Monthly in 1867, appeared in his collection The Tent on the Beach later that year, and became one of his best known works. The popularity of the "Palatine" name is largely due to Whittier's poem.

On the Saturday between Christmas and New Year's Eve, there are still sporadic reports from the locals of seeing a burning ship sail past. Tradition states that a German ship carrying immigrants to Philadelphia ran aground during a snow storm on December 26, 1738 and was stranded near Block Island. Depositions from the remaining crew members reported a loss of half the crew. However, folklorist Michael Bell noted when investigating the legend that two versions of the night's events began to be circulated almost a year after the incident.

The Block Islanders insisted that their citizens had made a valiant effort to rescue the crew, while those on the mainland of New England suspected the islanders of luring the ship toward them in an effort to seize their cargo. Both legends agreed that a female passenger had refused to leave the ship as it sank, and those who claim to witness its reappearances say that her screams are heard from the ship.

Today a marker exists on the spot where the ship is thought to have run aground, by the Mohegan Bluffs, which reads: Palatine Graves - 1738. Some claim that those who died that night lie buried under the soil. However, Charlotte Taylor of the Rhode Island Historical Preservation and Heritage Commission has noted that no physical evidence has ever been found to substantiate that claim, nor the legend itself.

== Popular culture ==
In the 2020 horror film The Block Island Sound, a character speculates that the Palatine shipwreck was caused by the crew being infected by a parasite that drew it in to a sea monster, in the manner of toxoplasmosis and cats.
