= Marcus Octavius =

Marcus Octavius was a name used for men among the gens Octavia. Marcus was one of the four chief praenomina used by the Octavii, the other three being Gaius, Gnaeus and Lucius. The most known member was the tribunus plebis in 133 BC and colleague-turned-opponent of Tiberius Gracchus.

Marcus Octavius also refers to men from several families of the gens Octavia:

Relatives of Augustus, member of the so-called Octavii Rufi:

- Marcus Octavius (tribune of the plebs 133 BC), political opponent of Tiberius Gracchus, possibly son of Gnaeus Octavius, consul in 165 BC;
- Marcus Octavius, tribune of the Plebs in an uncertain year, brought forward a law raising the corn's price;
- Marcus Octavius (aedile 50 BC), possibly grandson of the tribune of the Plebs in an uncertain year, a partisan of Pompey during the Civil War;
- Marcus Octavius, admiral of Mark Antony's fleet at the Battle of Actium in 31 BC.

Members of other families:

- Marcus Octavius Ligur, tribune of the Plebs in 82 BC with his brother, Lucius Octavius Ligur;
- Marcus Octavius Laenas Curtianus, one of the distinguished men who supplicated the judges on behalf of Marcus Aemilius Scaurus, in 54 BC;
- Marcus Octavius Herennius, trader, then the builder of a chapel to Hercules near the Porta Trigemina.
