= Lucius Octavius Balbus =

Ancient Roman jurist

Lucius Octavius Balbus was a jurist of Ancient Rome. He lived in the 1st century BCE. He was a contemporary of the orator Cicero. He was said to have been remarkable for his skill in Roman law, and for his attention to the duties of justice, morality, and religion.

== Ciceronian anecdote ==
There is a notable passage in Cicero in relation to Balbus. In it, Cicero accuses Verres of having directed an issue of fact in such an improper form, that even Lucius Octavius, if he had been appointed to try it, would have been obliged to adjudge the defendant in the cause either to give up an estate of his own to the plaintiff, or to pay pecuniary damages. The perfect acquaintance with Roman law, and the knowledge of his duty which Balbus possessed, would have compelled him to pass an unjust sentence.

To understand the compliment, it is necessary to remark, that in the time of Cicero a judex in a private cause was appointed for the occasion, and that his functions resembled those of a modern English juryman rather than those of a judge. It was his duty to try a given question, and according to his finding on that question, to pronounce the sentence of condemnation or acquittal contained in tho formula directed to him by the praetor. It was not his duty but the praetor's to determine whether the question was material, and whether the sentence was made to depend upon it in a manner consistent with justice.

In the ordinary form of Roman action for the recovery of a thing, as in the English action of detinue, the judgment for the plaintiff was not directly that the thing should be restored, but the defendant was condemned, unless it were restored, to pay damages.

== Death ==
The death of Octavius Balbus is related by writer and historian Valerius Maximus as a memorable example of paternal affection. Proscribed in 42 BC by the Second Triumvirate -- Mark Antony, Lepidus, and Octavian -- Balbus had already made his escape from his house, when a false report reached his ears that soldiers were murdering his son. Balbus returned to his house, and was consoled to see his son's safety, for the violent death to which he thus offered himself.

== Name ==
Some scholars consider the praenomen "Lucius" to be doubtful. Different manuscripts disagree about whether his name was Lucius Octavius Balbus or Publius Octavius Balbus.
