= Lady Lovibond =

Legendary ship

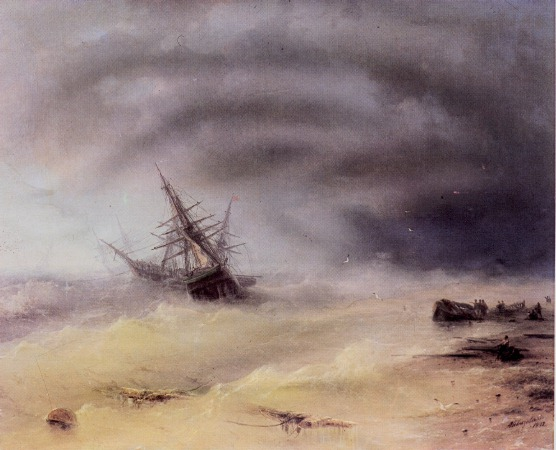
Aivasovsky Ivan Constantinovich storm 1872 IBI

The Lady Lovibond (sometimes spelled Luvibond) is the name given to a legendary schooner that is alleged to have been wrecked on the Goodwin Sands, off the Kent coast of south-east England, on 13 February 1748, and is said to reappear there every fifty years as a ghost ship. No contemporary records of the ship or its supposed sinking have been found.

The story goes that the ship was at sea on 13 February because her captain, Simon Reed (in some accounts named Simon Peel), had just been married, and was celebrating the occasion with a cruise. According to several accounts, the ship was bound for Porto in Portugal. Despite the longstanding sailors' superstition that it was bad luck to bring a woman on board, Reed had brought his bride Annetta with him on the ship.

According to legend, the first mate, John Rivers, a rival for the hand of the captain's young wife, was pacing the decks in jealous anger. While the captain, his wife and their guests were celebrating the marriage below deck, the first mate was seized with a fit of jealous rage. Casually drawing a heavy, club-like belaying pin from the rail, the mate walked softly up behind the crew member at the wheel and felled him to the deck with one crushing blow. Rivers then seized the wheel and steered the ship onto the treacherous Goodwin Sands, killing everyone aboard. A subsequent inquiry into the disaster recorded a verdict of misadventure.

The first supposed sighting of the phantom Lady Lovibond, on 13 February 1798, was reported by at least two ships: the Edenbridge, captained by James Westlake, and a fishing smack. Its alleged 1848 appearance convinced local seamen that a wreck had occurred – they sent out lifeboats from Deal in hopes of rescuing the survivors. Captain Bull Prestwick allegedly sighted her in 1948 and reported that she looked real, but gave off an eerie white glow. There was no reported 1998 sighting.

The Goodwin Sands are England's most fertile grounds for ghost ships, and are also the location of the legendary island of Lomea. The Lady Lovibond shares the area with two other phantom vessels: a liner called the SS Montrose, and the Shrewsbury, a man-of-war.

Researchers George Behe and Michael Goss came to the conclusion that there are no reliable primary sources that mention the Lady Lovibond before a 1924 article in the Daily Chronicle. They speculated that the ship may have been a fabrication from the journalist, or based on a ship that sailed into view between 1914 and 1924. Behe and Goss speculate that stories about the ship may have been invented for Valentine's Day and there were similarities with the story from other fictional ghost stories.
