= Governor Parr =

Historic derelict ship

History
- Name: Governor Parr
- Owner: A.F. Davidson (1918-1920), V.C. Henschell (after 1921)
- Operator: Captain A.D. Richards
- Route: Buenos Ayres, Argentina via Ingramport, Nova Scotia
- Builder: W.R. Huntley & Sons
- Launched: November 30, 1918
- Identification: 141163
- Fate: Ghost ship (ultimate fate unknown)

General characteristics
- Type: Schooner
- Masts: 4
- Signal letters: T N W D
- Tonnage: 912
- Length: 200 ft (61 m)
- Depth: 18.6 ft (5.7 m)

Governor Parr was a four-masted schooner built in Parrsboro, Nova Scotia in 1918. Built by W.R. Huntley & Sons for Archie Davidson and Captain Angus D. Richards, she is claimed to be the "most handsome schooner built in Atlantic Canada" and was also the last schooner built in Parrsboro. She was named after early Governor of Nova Scotia John Parr.

Governor Parr met an unfortunate fate on October 3, 1923, while carrying one million board feet of lumber from Ingramport, NS to Buenos Aires, Argentina. During this voyage she lost her mizzen and spanker in a storm. Captain Angus Richards and one seaman lost their lives during the incident. The remainder of the crew were rescued by S.S. Schodack.

The damage incurred by Governor Parr was significant to the masts and deck of the ship; however, she did not sink. Instead, she remained afloat and drifted throughout the Atlantic. Several attempts were made to either destroy or tow this derelict to shore, but all failed. On January 1, 1924, the American Coast Guard's USCGC Tampa attempted to tow Parr towards Halifax, NS. Parr broke away from the tow line on January 2 in a heavy gale. Tampa had to give up this attempt to return to shore to refuel.

Governor Parr was sighted for many years after her 1923 abandonment but managed to remain afloat and cover large spans of the Atlantic Ocean. She remained a derelict and a "menace to navigation," drifting as far as the Canary Islands. Her ability to make this journey without a captain or a crew demonstrates high-quality shipbuilding. The ultimate fate of Governor Parr is unknown.
