= Zebrina (ship) =

UK three-masted sailing barge (1873-1953)

History

United Kingdom
- Name: Zebrina
- Laid down: 1873
- Fate: Destroyed by fire 1953

General characteristics
- Class & type: schooner-rigged, 3-masted sailing barge
- Tons burthen: 189
- Complement: 5

Zebrina (/zəˈbriːnə/) was a schooner-rigged, three-masted sailing barge, of 189 tons, built in 1873 at Whitstable, Kent, England. She was originally intended to trade on the River Plate in South America. She was discovered aground on the coast of France in October 1917 with her crew missing.

The Zebrina sailed from Falmouth in October 1917, commanded by Captain Martin, with a crew of 5 and cargo of Swansea coal for Saint-Brieuc, France. Two days later, she was found ashore on Rozel Point, south of Cherbourg, without damage except for some disarrangement of her rigging, but without her crew.

At the time, her crew was assumed to have been taken off by a Unterseeboot preparatory to the submarine sinking the vessel by gunfire. The U-boat presumably sighted, or was sighted by, an Allied vessel and departed the scene before she could sink the Zebrina, and was later sunk herself with the crew of the Zebrina aboard. A subsequent investigation, described in When Ships Go Down by David Masters, published in 1932, came to the conclusion the crew of five had been washed overboard in a squall and the craft had sailed on without them.

The case is often referenced in popular books about mysterious disappearances, where her destination is commonly misprinted as Saint Brieux, and she was claimed to have been found adrift.

She was destroyed by fire in 1953 at Velder Creek (an inlet of Langstone Harbour) in Portsmouth.
