= Tai Ching 21 =

Abandoned Taiwanese fishing vessel

The MV Tai Ching 21 (Chinese: 大慶21號) was a Taiwanese fishing vessel which was found empty and gutted by fire on 9 November 2008 near Kiribati. The abandoned 50-ton ship had suffered a fire several days previously, and its lifeboat and three life rafts were missing. No mayday call was received. The date of the last radio transmission from the vessel was 28 October 2008. A search of 21,000 square miles (54,000 km^{2}) of the Pacific Ocean north of Fiji by a U.S. Air Force C-130 Hercules and a New Zealand Air Force P-3 Orion found no trace of the Taiwanese captain Yan Jingang (Chinese: 顏金港; pinyin: Yán Jīn-gǎng) or crew (18 Chinese, 6 Indonesians, and 4 Filipinos).
