= SS Baychimo =

20th century ghost ship

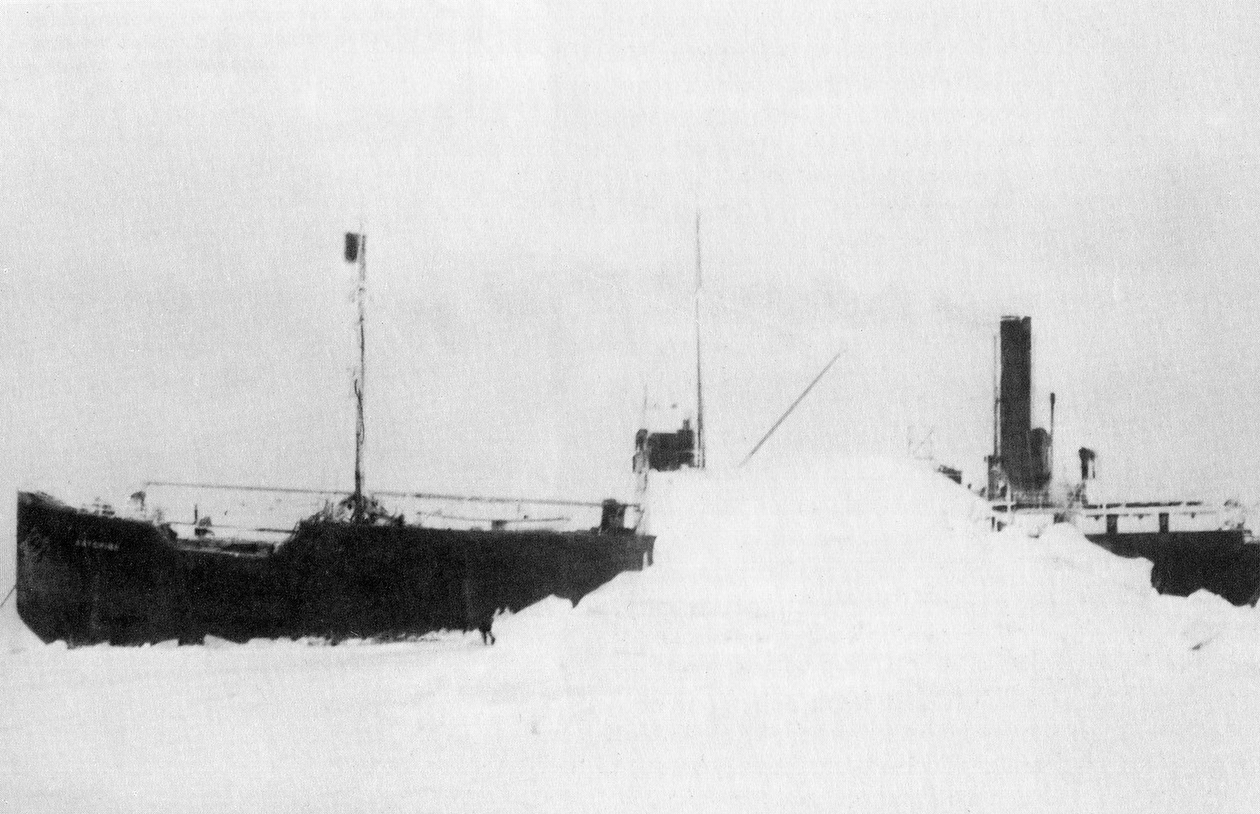
- Baychimo, 1931

History

Germany
- Name: Ångermanelfven
- Owner: Baltische Reederei GmbH, Hamburg
- Builder: Lindholmens Mekaniska Verkstad A/B, Gothenburg, Sweden
- Yard number: 420
- Launched: 1914
- Fate: To the UK as war reparations

History

United Kingdom
- Name: Baychimo
- Owner: Hudson's Bay Company
- Port of registry: London
- Acquired: 1921
- Home port: Ardrossan, Scotland
- Fate: Abandoned and lost at sea, 1931; Last seen, 1969, ultimate fate unknown

General characteristics
- Type: Cargo ship
- Tonnage: 1,322 tons
- Length: 230 ft (70 m)
- Propulsion: Triple expansion steam engine
- Speed: 10 kn (19 km/h; 12 mph)

SS Baychimo was a steel-hulled, 1,322 ton cargo steamer built in 1914 in Sweden and owned by the Hudson's Bay Company, used to trade provisions for pelts in Inuit settlements along the Victoria Island coast of the Northwest Territories of Canada. She became a notable ghost ship along the Alaska coast, being abandoned in 1931 and seen numerous times since then until her last sighting in 1969.

== Early history ==
Baychimo was launched in 1914 as Ångermanelfven by the Lindholmens shipyard (Lindholmens Mekaniska Verkstad A/B) in Gothenburg, Sweden, for the Baltische Reederei GmbH of Hamburg. She was 230 ft (70 m) long, powered by a triple-expansion steam engine and had a speed of 10 kn (19 km/h; 12 mph). Ångermanelfven was used on trade routes between Hamburg and Sweden until the First World War. After the war, she was passed to the United Kingdom as part of the First World War reparations by Germany for shipping losses and acquired by the Hudson's Bay Company in 1921. Renamed Baychimo and based in Ardrossan, Scotland, she completed nine successful voyages along the north coast of Canada, visiting trading posts and collecting pelts.

== Abandonment ==
On October 1, 1931, at the end of a trading run and loaded with a cargo of fur, Baychimo became trapped in pack ice. The crew briefly abandoned the ship, travelling over a 1/2 mi (0.80 km) of ice to the town of Barrow, Alaska (now Utqiagvik) to take shelter for two days, but the ship had broken free of the ice by the time the crew returned. The ship became mired again on October 8, more thoroughly this time, and on October 15, the Hudson's Bay Company sent aircraft to retrieve 22 of the crew. Fifteen of the crew remained behind, intending to wait out the winter if necessary, and constructed a wooden shelter some distance away.

On November 24, a powerful blizzard struck, and after it abated, they found no sign of Baychimo; the skipper concluded that she must have broken up and sunk in the storm. A few days later, however, an Inuk seal hunter informed them that he had seen Baychimo about 45 mi (72 km) away from their position. The 15 men proceeded to track the ship down, and deciding that the ship was unlikely to survive the winter, retrieved the most valuable furs from the hold to transport by air. Baychimo was then abandoned.

== Ghost ship ==
Baychimo did not sink, and over the next several decades, numerous sightings were made of the ship. People managed to board her several times, but each time, they were either unequipped to salvage the ship or driven away by bad weather. The last recorded sighting of Baychimo was by a group of Inuit in 1969, 38 years after she was abandoned. She was stuck fast in the pack ice of the Beaufort Sea between Point Barrow and Icy Cape in the Chukchi Sea off the northwestern Alaskan coast. Baychimo's ultimate fate is unknown, but due to the lack of sighting since 1969 and the fact that the ship's metal would be subjected to temperature cycling every year, she is presumed to have sunk.

== Sightings ==
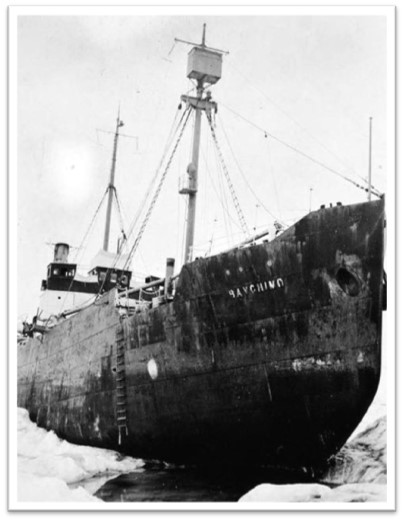
Baychimo in 1933, two years after being abandoned

- A few days after Baychimo disappeared, the ship was found 45 mi (72 km) south of where she was lost, but was again ice-packed.
- After several months, she was spotted again about 300 mi (480 km) to the east.
- In January of the following year, she was seen floating peacefully near the shore by Leslie Melvin, a man travelling to Nome with his dog sled team.
- A few months after that, she was seen by a company of prospectors.
- In March 1933, she was found by a group of Iñupiat, who boarded her and were trapped aboard for 10 days by a freak storm.
- On August 11, 1933, she was sighted 12 mi (19 km) off the settlement of Wainwright, Alaska. She was boarded by local inhabitants, as well as by the crew of the M.S. Trader and their passenger, author and botanist Isobel Wylie Hutchison. A whaleboat, some furniture, and several other items were salvaged.
- In August 1933, the Hudson's Bay Company heard she was still afloat but too far at sea to salvage.
- In July 1934, she was boarded by a group of explorers on a schooner.
- In September 1935, she was spotted off the Alaskan coast.
- In November 1939, she was boarded by Captain Hugh Polson in an attempt to salvage her, but the creeping ice floes intervened and Polson was forced to abandon her.
- She was spotted numerous times over the following years, but always eluded capture.
- In March 1962, she was seen drifting along the Beaufort Sea coast by a group of Inuit.
- She was found frozen in an ice pack in 1969, 38 years after she was abandoned. This is the last recorded sighting of Baychimo.
- In 2006, the Alaskan government began work on a project to solve the mystery of "the Ghost Ship of the Arctic" and locate Baychimo, whether still afloat or on the ocean floor. She has not yet been found.

== In education ==
"Alaska's Phantom Ship", an article about the vessel, was printed in the textbook Galaxies (Houghton Mifflin: Boston, 1971, 1974 p. 180.)
