= MV Alta =

Abandoned ghost ship

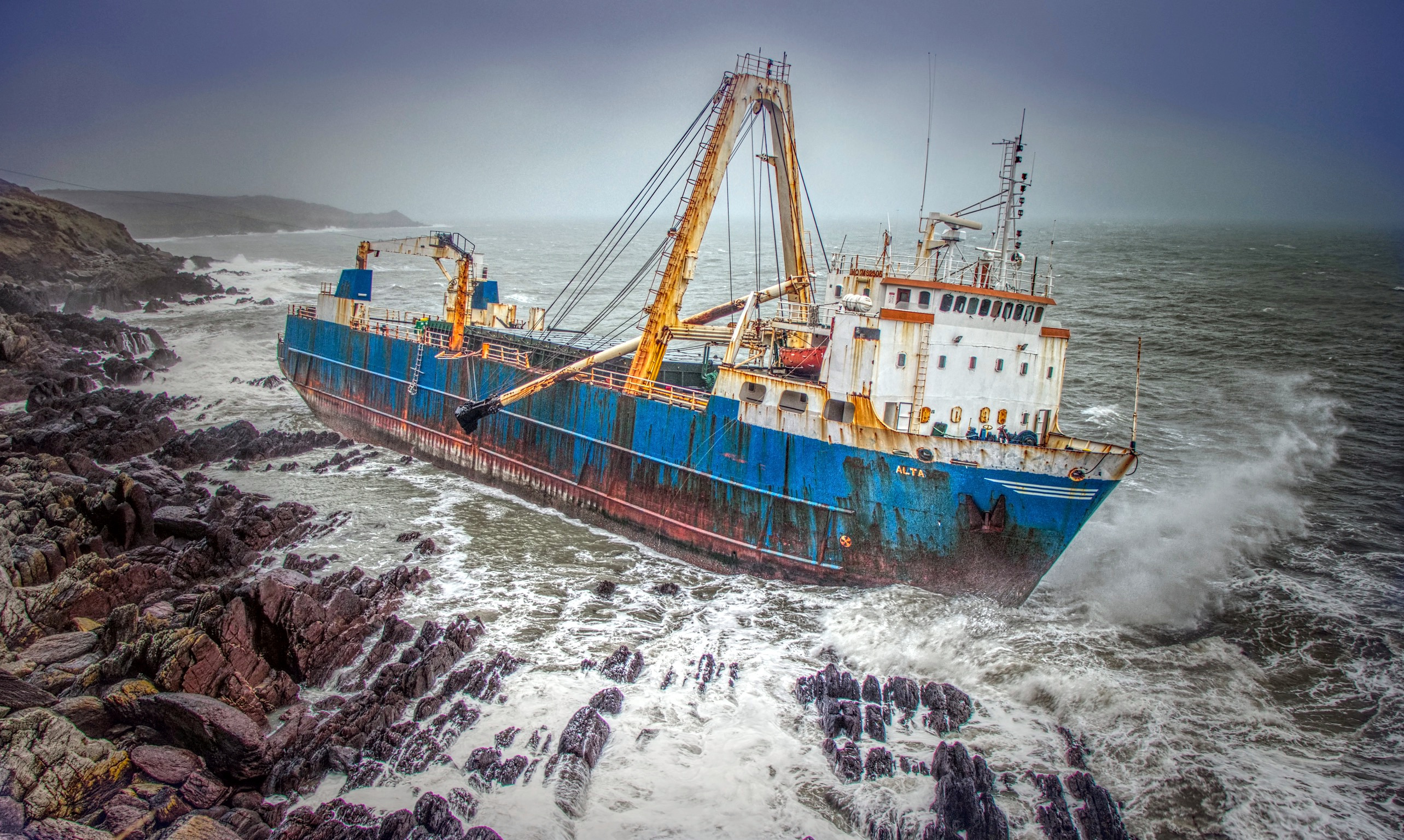
- MV Alta aground at Ballycotton, County Cork

History
- Name: 1976–1990: Tananger; 1990–1993: Pomar Murman; 1993–2000: Polar Trader; 2000–2013: Avantis II; 2013–2015: Avantis I; 2015–2017: Elias; 2017–present: Alta
- Port of registry: Panama or Tanzania
- Launched: 17 March 1976
- Completed: 1976
- Maiden voyage: 1976
- In service: 1976
- Out of service: 2018
- Identification: IMO number: 7432305; Callsign: H3ST
- Fate: Abandoned in October 2018; currently grounded at Ballycotton, County Cork, Ireland

General characteristics
- Tonnage: 2295 t
- Length: 77.32 m (253 ft 8 in)
- Installed power: Diesel
- Speed: 7.2 knots (13.3 km/h; 8.3 mph)
- Capacity: 1640 t DWT

MV Alta is an abandoned merchant vessel currently located in Ireland. Constructed in 1976 with the name Tananger, Alta was abandoned at sea in October 2018 and washed ashore in Ireland in February 2020, where her wreckage remains.

== Career ==
Alta was constructed in 1976 as the Tananger, and has had several other names before becoming the Alta in 2017. By 2015, she was equipped with an Automatic Identification System (AIS) which allowed her movements to be tracked. She periodically switched the AIS on and off as she mostly travelled around the Mediterranean Sea. Deactivating the AIS is unusual, as is the numerous name changes the ship had in her later years, which can indicate involvement in illegal activity.

== Abandonment ==
In October 2018, the ship was on a voyage from Greece to Haiti. Such a long trip is unusual for a ship of this type and size, which typically stays closer to shorelines. The ship's engines failed in the Atlantic Ocean, leaving the crew stranded. The United States Coast Guard rescued the crew about 2,200 km (1,400 mi) south-east of Bermuda, and the ship was abandoned.

After her abandonment, the ship's next moves are uncertain. An unverified report suggested that she was towed to Guyana and possibly hijacked, only to be abandoned a second time. Regardless of what happened, the ghost ship was next sighted by HMS Protector in August or September 2019, near Bermuda. After this sighting, she likely continued to drift at very low speeds before eventually arriving in Ireland. However, the AIS was not functioning after her abandonment, making her course uncertain.

Journey of the MV Alva, compiled from reports.

== Wreckage ==
On 16 February 2020, the Alta ran aground on the Irish coast near Ballycotton, County Cork amid Storm Dennis. The fact of it being a modern-day ghost ship, as well as the length of time it spent floating at sea (18 months), raised notable public interest.

The responsibility of the wreck fell to Irish Minister for the Marine as per the Salvage and Wreck Act 1993, until such time as a receiver of wreck be appointed. Despite efforts to determine the ownership of the ship—so that the Irish state can try to recover costs incurred—as of December 2020 ownership had not been established. Although the ship's commercial scrap value is "low," the cost to the Irish exchequer of removing the wreck could exceed €10 million. Alta had previously been the subject of an ownership dispute, with claims she was once hijacked and towed to Guyana, but efforts have been made to establish where she was last registered. Some reports suggest the ship was sailing under a Panamanian flag when her crew were rescued and she was abandoned in October 2018, while other reports suggest she was registered in Tanzania. Sixty-two full barrels of oil were ultimately removed from the wreck by helicopter. Afterwards, the ship was sealed off and made inaccessible.

By October 2020, the wreckage had deteriorated to the point that the Cork County Council feared that the ship would break apart. The county has requested assistance from other departments of the Irish government in removing the ship. Options including scrapping her, towing her out to sea and scuttling her were considered, however by early 2022 the hull of Alta had split in two following a series of storms. A report announced by the Department of Transport and Cork County Council in February 2023 on how to proceed with the Alta concluded that the risk to the general public had been reduced to medium following mitigation efforts by the authorities and risk to the environment was at acceptable levels.

As of 2024, there are no plans to remove the wreck, as doing so would put salvagers and the local environment at risk.
