= Deriana =

Deriana دريانة
- Town
- Location in Libya
- Coordinates: 32°20′50″N 20°18′32″E
- Country: Libya
- District: Benghazi

Population (2006)
  - Total: 4,532
- Time zone: UTC + 2
- Area code: 625

Deriana or Daryanah (Arabic: دريانة) is a town in the Benghazi District, of the Cyrenaica region in northeastern Libya. It is located 32 km (20 mi) east of Benghazi.

The town's name probably came from the ancient Roman city Hadrianopolis (Ancient Greek: Ἁδριανούπολις), also known as Hadriane (Ancient Greek: Ἀδριανή), which was located near present-day Deriana.
