= Gnaeus Octavius =

Gnaeus Octavius can refer to several politicians of ancient Rome:

- Gnaeus Octavius Rufus, quaestor circa 230 BC
- Gnaeus Octavius (consul 165 BC)
- Gnaeus Octavius (consul 128 BC)
- Gnaeus Octavius (consul 87 BC)
- Gnaeus Octavius (consul 76 BC)

== See also ==
- Octavius (disambiguation)
