= List of sailors =

This list of sailors includes any seagoing person who does not qualify for the list of sea captains. It includes both professional and amateur sailors.

== Actors ==
- Raymond Bailey, American actor, Milburn Drysdale, on The Beverly Hillbillies
- Rupert Davies, British actor, title role on the BBC's Maigret
- Peter Falk, American actor, Columbo
- James Garner, American actor, Jim Rockford on The Rockford Files
- Sterling Hayden, American actor and author, Gen. Jack D. Ripper in Dr. Strangelove
- Jack Lord, American actor, Steve McGarret on Hawaii Five-O
- Carroll O'Connor, American actor, Archie Bunker on All in the Family
- Denver Pyle, American actor, Uncle Jesse Duke on The Dukes of Hazzard
- George Sewell, English actor, Frank Cottam on The Detectives; steward
- Frederick Treves, much loved English character actor with over a hundred credits in theatre, television, and film
- Clint Walker, American actor, Cheyenne Bodie on Cheyenne
- Jack Warden, American actor, Emmy Award-winning, Academy Award-nominated

== Comedians ==
- Dave Broadfoot, Canadian comedian
- George Roper, English stand-up comedian best known for work on television series The Comedians

== Explorers ==
- Erik the Red
- Bjorn Ironside
- Leif Erikson
- Ali ibn al-Hassan Shirazi
- James Cook, sub-Antarctic, Pacific, North America, apprenticed on a Whitby collier
- Ernest Shackleton. Antarctic, was third mate in the Union-Castle Line

== Labor leaders ==
- Joseph Curran, American labor leader
- Richard Henry Dana Jr. (1815–1882), wrote Two Years Before the Mast
- Andrew Furuseth (1854–1938), merchant seaman and labour leader
- Shannon J. Wall, American merchant seaman and labor leader

== Maritime industry ==
- Officers of RMS Titanic
  - Captain Edward Smith
  - Chief Officer Henry Wilde
  - First Officer William Murdoch
  - Second Officer Charles Lightoller
  - Third Officer Herbert Pitman
  - Fourth Officer Joseph Boxhall
  - Fifth Officer Harold Lowe
  - Sixth Officer James Moody
- Captain John Bury, Canadian mariner involved in standardising international buoyage
- Harry McNish, Scottish carpenter on Sir Ernest Shackleton's Imperial Trans-Antarctic Expedition
- Jeremiah O'Brien, captain of the privateer Unity in the first battle of the Revolutionary War
- John Wallace Thomas, Newfoundland captain made Commander of the Order of the British Empire for actions during a Luftwaffe attack
- Louis Ernest Sola, Federal Maritime Commissioner and yachtsman

== Military ==
- Kingsmill Bates, British Distinguished Service Cross recipient
- Philip Bent, Canadian recipient of the Victoria Cross
- David Broadfoot, Scottish recipient of the George Cross
- Lionel Crabb, British Royal Navy frogman who vanished during a reconnaissance mission first in 1956
- Jacques Félix Emmanuel Hamelin, French Baron and rear admiral of the Navy; was a helmsman early in his career
- Peter Horsley, British Air Marshal
- Lawrence Joel, Vietnam War Medal of Honor recipient
- John Paul Jones, American naval officer
- "Yank" Levy, Canadian soldier, military instructor and author of a manual on guerrilla warfare
- Charles Andrew MacGillivary, Canadian Medal of Honor recipient
- Kim Malthe-Bruun, member of the Danish resistance movement
- Thomas McClelland, American naval officer
- George S. Patton, American general
- George H. O'Brien Jr., Medal of Honor recipient in Korean War
- Arthur Phillip, British naval officer, colonial administrator, Governor of New South Wales, and founder of the city of Sydney
- William Sanders, New Zealander recipient of the Victoria Cross
- Miguel Grau Seminario, Peruvian naval officer and hero of the Naval Battle of Angamos
- John Young, naval officer in American Revolutionary War

== Musicians and composers ==
- Ken Colyer, British jazz trumpeter
- Suezenne Fordham, American jazz pianist
- Eric Griffiths, Welsh guitarist in the original lineup of The Quarry Men
- Woody Guthrie, musician and songwriter, wrote "This Land Is Your Land"
- Chick Henderson, English singer in the 1930s and 1940s, "Begin the Beguine"
- Cisco Houston, American folk singer
- Ferlin Husky, American country-pop singer, hit number one with "Wings of a Dove"
- Nelson Riddle, American bandleader, arranger and orchestrator, "C'mon... Get Happy"
- Francisco Gabilondo Soler, Mexican composer of children's songs, "Cri-Cri, El Grillito Cantor"
- Dave Van Ronk, American folk singer nicknamed the "Mayor of MacDougal Street"
- Ted Weems, American bandleader and musician, directed the Merchant Marine Band
- Russ Conway, English pianist

== Notorious ==
- William Colepaugh, Nazi spy in World War II
- George Hennard, American mass murderer who claimed twenty-three victims at Luby's Cafeteria in Killeen, Texas
- Fritz Sauckel, Nazi war criminal
- Duncan Scott-Ford, British merchant seaman hanged for treachery in World War II
- Perry Smith, made famous in Truman Capote's non-fiction novel In Cold Blood

== Politics and activism ==
- April Ashley, transgender rights activist
- Alvin Baldus, former Democratic member of Congress
- Traian Băsescu, President of Romania, inaugurated in 2004
- Gordon Canfield, Republican congressman from New Jersey
- Alfonso J. Cervantes, forty-third Mayor of Saint Louis, Missouri
- Frederick Arthur Cobb, Labour Party politician in the United Kingdom
- Mark Croucher, Director of Communications for the UK Independence Party, pub landlord, journalist, former radio officer
- Arthur Davidson, British Labour Party Member of Parliament
- Jim Folsom, Democratic Governor of the U.S. state of Alabama
- Ian Glachan, Australian politician, member of the New South Wales Legislative Assembly
- Brian Haw, British peace activist
- Harry Haywood, a leading African American member of both the Communist Party of the United States (CPUSA) and the Communist Party of the Soviet Union (CPSU)
- John Horner, British firefighter, trade unionist and politician
- Piet de Jong, Prime Minister of the Netherlands
- Wayne Mapp, New Zealand politician
- Alfred von Niezychowski, Polish noble, German Count, author and lecturer, and American politician
- Jack O'Dell, prominent African-American member of the U.S. civil rights movement
- Albert Owen, Welsh politician, Labour Party MP for Ynys Môn
- John Prescott, British Labour Party politician, Deputy Prime Minister, First Secretary of State and Member of Parliament, a steward and waiter
- Joseph Resnick, Democratic congressman from New York
- Montfort Stokes, Democratic Senator
- John S. Watson, New Jersey politician
- Terry Wynn, retired Labour Party Member of the European Parliament for North West England
- Zoltan Istvan, American journalist, political activist, and futurist

== Producers ==
- John Clark, English actor, director, producer, and ex-husband of Lynn Redgrave
- John Kenley, former American theatrical producer
- Oliver Stone, three-time Academy Award-winning American film director and screenwriter

== Radio industry ==
- Dave Cash, British disk jockey
- James Redmond, pioneer of modern public service broadcasting in the United Kingdom
- Tommy Vance, British pop radio broadcaster

== Science, engineering, and architecture ==
- Patrick Young Alexander, British aeronautical pioneer
- Francis Buchanan-Hamilton, Scottish physician, geographer zoologist and botanist
- Allan V. Cox, American chemist and geologist
- Norman Jaffe, American architect
- D. Holmes Morton, American physician specializing in genetic disorders

== Social scientists ==
- Douglass Cecil North, American economist and Nobel Prize winner

== Sports ==
- Samuel Albrecht, Brazilian swimmer
- Bobby Atherton, Welsh international footballer
- Jim Bagby Jr., major-league baseball pitcher
- Fred Blackburn, English footballer and coach
- Drew Bundini Brown, Muhammad Ali's assistant trainer and cornerman
- Dan Devine, American football coach
- Joe Gold, bodybuilding and fitness guru of Gold's Gym
- Cornelius Johnson, American Olympic medal-winning high jumper
- Charlie Keller, left fielder in Major League Baseball
- Frank Sinkwich, American footballer, won 1942 Heisman Trophy, 1944 NFL MVP
- Agostino Straulino (1914–2004), Olympic champion and Italian admiral
- Jim Thorpe, American Olympic athlete
- Henk de Velde, Dutch seafarer known for his long solo voyages around the world
- Matthew Webb, first person to swim the English Channel without the use of artificial aid

== Visual arts ==
- Richard Avedon, American photographer
- Johnny Craig, American comic book artist
- Paul Gauguin, French Post-Impressionist artist
- Rockwell Kent, American painter
- Joseph Stanley Kozlowski, American AB, portrait and watercolor artist
- James Nachtwey, American photojournalist and war photographer
- George Rodger, British photojournalist noted for work in Africa and death camps at Bergen-Belsen
- Ken Russell, iconoclastic English film director
- Ernie Schroeder, American comic book artist
- Haskell Wexler, American Academy Award-winning cinematographer
- Wally Wood, American comic book writer, artist and independent publisher
- Rek Bell, Canadian illustrator

== Writers and publishers ==
- John Arthur Barry, Australian journalist and author
- Peter Baynham, Welsh screenwriter; Academy Award-nominated; co-writer of Borat
- John Blackburn, British novelist
- Nathaniel Bowditch, author, The American Practical Navigator
- E. S. Campbell, American author, broadcaster and radio officer
- A. Bertram Chandler, Australian science fiction author of over 40 novels and 200 works of short fiction
- Brian Cleeve, English writer and popular TV broadcaster
- E. E. Cowper, English novelist
- Frank Cowper, English yachtsman and author
- Olaudah Equiano, former slave turned abolitionist and writer of African descent
- Clare Francis, British novelist
- Allen Ginsberg, poet, "Howl", "Kaddish"
- David Hackworth, retired United States Army colonel and military journalist
- Richard Henry Dana Jr., American author, Two Years Before the Mast
- John L. Hess, American journalist
- Herbert Huncke, American beat generation figure
- Bob Kaufman, American Beat poet and surrealist
- Nikos Kavvadias, Greek poet
- Jack Kerouac, American author, On The Road
- James Lennox Kerr, Scottish socialist author noted for his children's stories
- Jack London, American author, Call of the Wild
- John Masefield, O.M., LL.D., Poet Laureate, sailing ship apprentice
- Kevin McClory, Irish screenwriter, producer, and director, Never Say Never Again
- Herman Melville, American author, Moby Dick
- Charles Muñoz, American poet, novelist, publisher, and radio officer
- Alun Owen, British screenwriter, wrote The Beatles' film A Hard Day's Night
- Michael Page, British Australian novelist and author of the Encyclopedia of Things That Never Were
- Donn Pearce, author of Cool Hand Luke
- Dudley Pope, British writer of both nautical fiction and history
- Richard Scott Prather, American mystery novelist
- Otto Scott, American journalist and author
- Hubert Selby Jr., American author
- Joshua Slocum (1848–1909?), first single-handed circumnavigation of the world, 1895-1898
- Gary Snyder, American poet
- Lyle Stuart, controversial American publisher
- Derek Turner, Irish magazine editor and freelance journalist
- Mark Twain (born Samuel Clemens), author
- Nedd Willard (1926–2018), writer and journalist
- Charles Williams, writer of hardboiled crime fiction
- Robin Wilson, American science fiction author and university president
- Bernard Wolfe, American fiction writer

== Other ==
- Popeye (created 1929) cartoon fictional character created by Elzie Crisler Segar
- Crispus Attucks (1723–1770), victim of the Boston Massacre
- Peter Blake (1944–2001), winner of the Whitbread Round the World Race, the America's Cup and the Jules Verne Trophy
- Chay Blyth (born 1940), completed the first westward single-handed non-stop circumnavigation of the world, 1971
- Jean-Charles de Borda (1733–1799), scientist and engineer working at sea
- William Harvey Carney (1842–1908), Civil War soldier, previously a sailor
- Russ Chauvenet (1920–2003), one of the founders of science fiction fandom; amateur sailor
- Sir Francis Chichester, completed the first single-handed circumnavigation of the world with just one port of call, 1966-1967
- Granville Conway, public servant, Presidential Medal for Merit recipient
- Harvey Cox, preeminent theologian and professor at Harvard Divinity School
- Donald Crowhurst, lost at sea during the Golden Globe race
- James Dougherty, first husband of Marilyn Monroe
- Michael Eavis, founder of the Glastonbury Festival
- David Fasold, salvage expert, self-proclaimed "arkologist"
- Charles Henry George Howard, 20th Earl of Suffolk, 13th Earl of Berkshire, apprentice on windjammer Mount Stewart
- Robin Knox-Johnston (born 1939), completed the first single-handed non-stop circumnavigation of the world, 1968-1969
- Sadie O. Horton, spent World War II working aboard a coastwise U.S. Merchant Marine barge, and posthumously received official veteran's status for her wartime service, becoming the first recorded female Merchant Marine veteran of World War II
- Samuel Leech (1798–1848), wrote of experiences in both the Royal Navy and US Navy
- Freddie Lennon, father of English musician John Lennon
- Ellen MacArthur, British sailor and round-the-world record holder
- Doris Miller (1919–1943), cook who fought back at Pearl Harbor
- Abdul Awal Mintoo, Bengali businessman and former President of the Federation of Bangladesh Chambers of Commerce and Industry
- Bernard Motissier (1925–1994), French yachtsman and author of books about his voyages and sailing
- Jacob Nagle (1762–1841), well-traveled seaman who wrote a journal
- Altineu Pires (?-?), Brazilian navigation teacher, sailing author
- Jure Šterk (1937–2009), Slovenian round-the-world sailor and author of books about his voyages and sailing
- Joseph D. Stewart, Vice Admiral, Superintendent of the United States Merchant Marine Academy
- Paul Teutul Sr., American television personality
- Jordan Weisman, American game designer
- Devine Lu Linvega, Canadian video game developer and musician

== See also ==
- Notable mariners
- Category:Sailors
- Category:Merchant navy
- Category:Water transport
