= Paranoá, Federal District =

Paranoá
- Administrative region
- Região Administrativa de Paranoá; Administrative Region of Paranoá
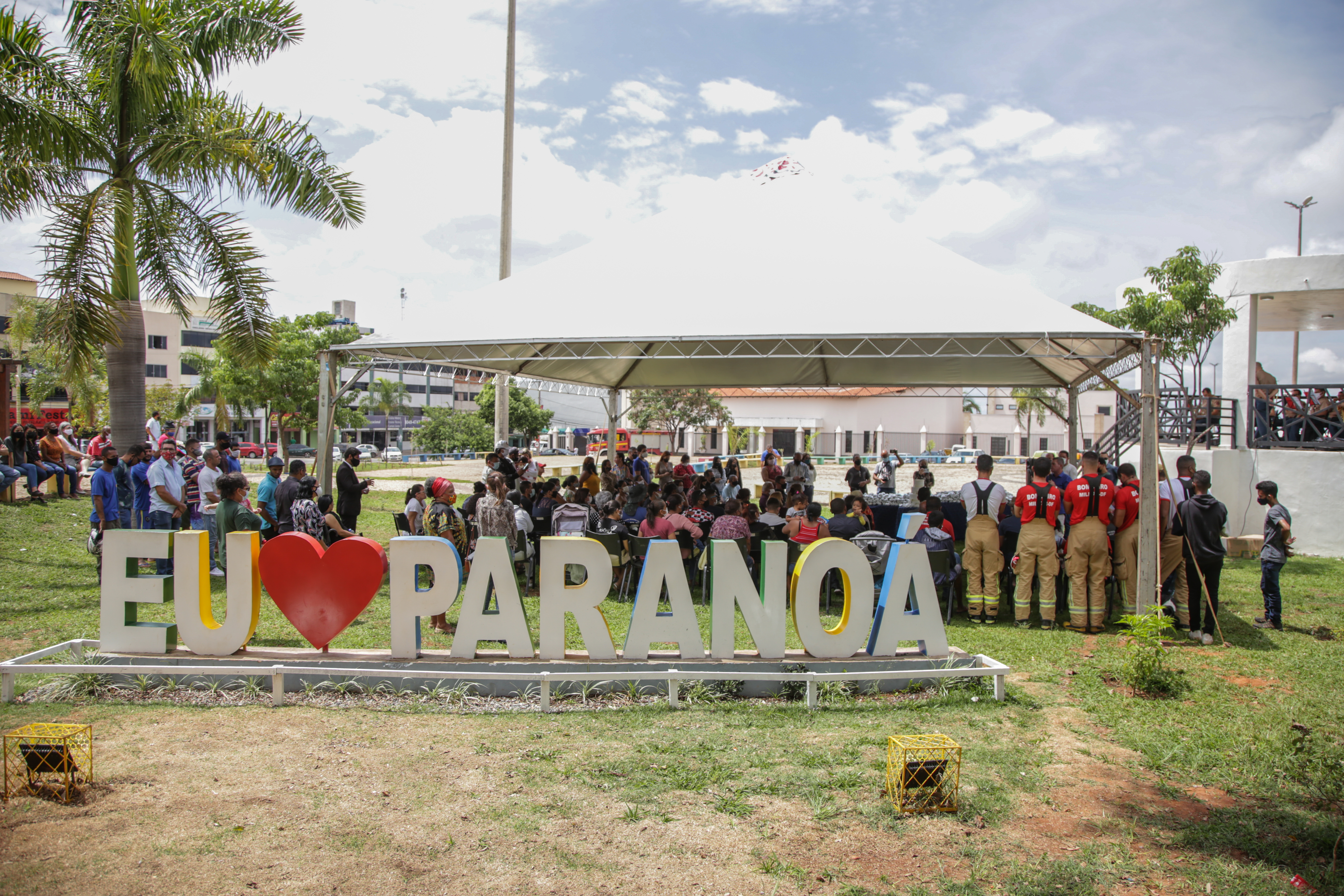
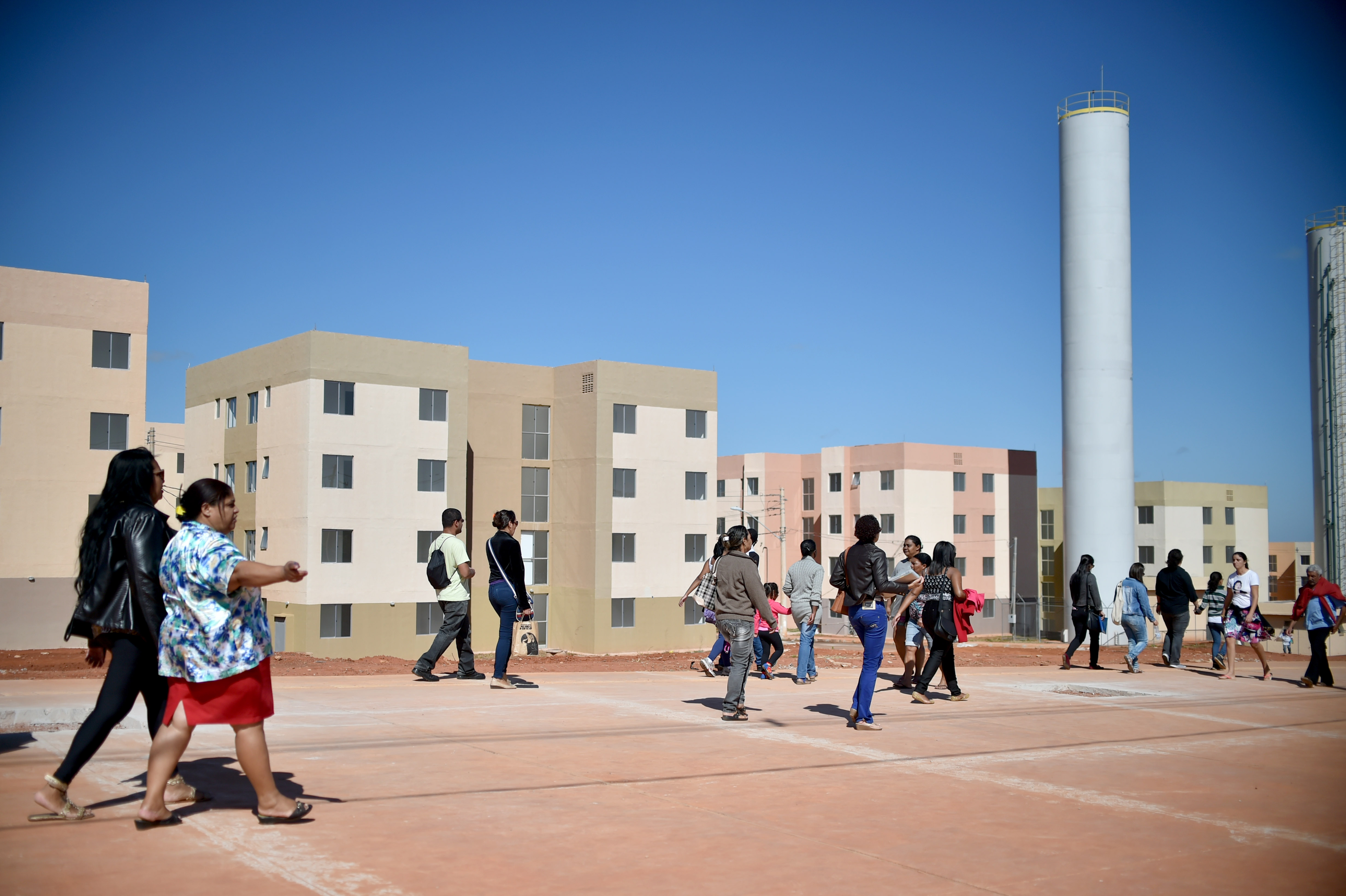
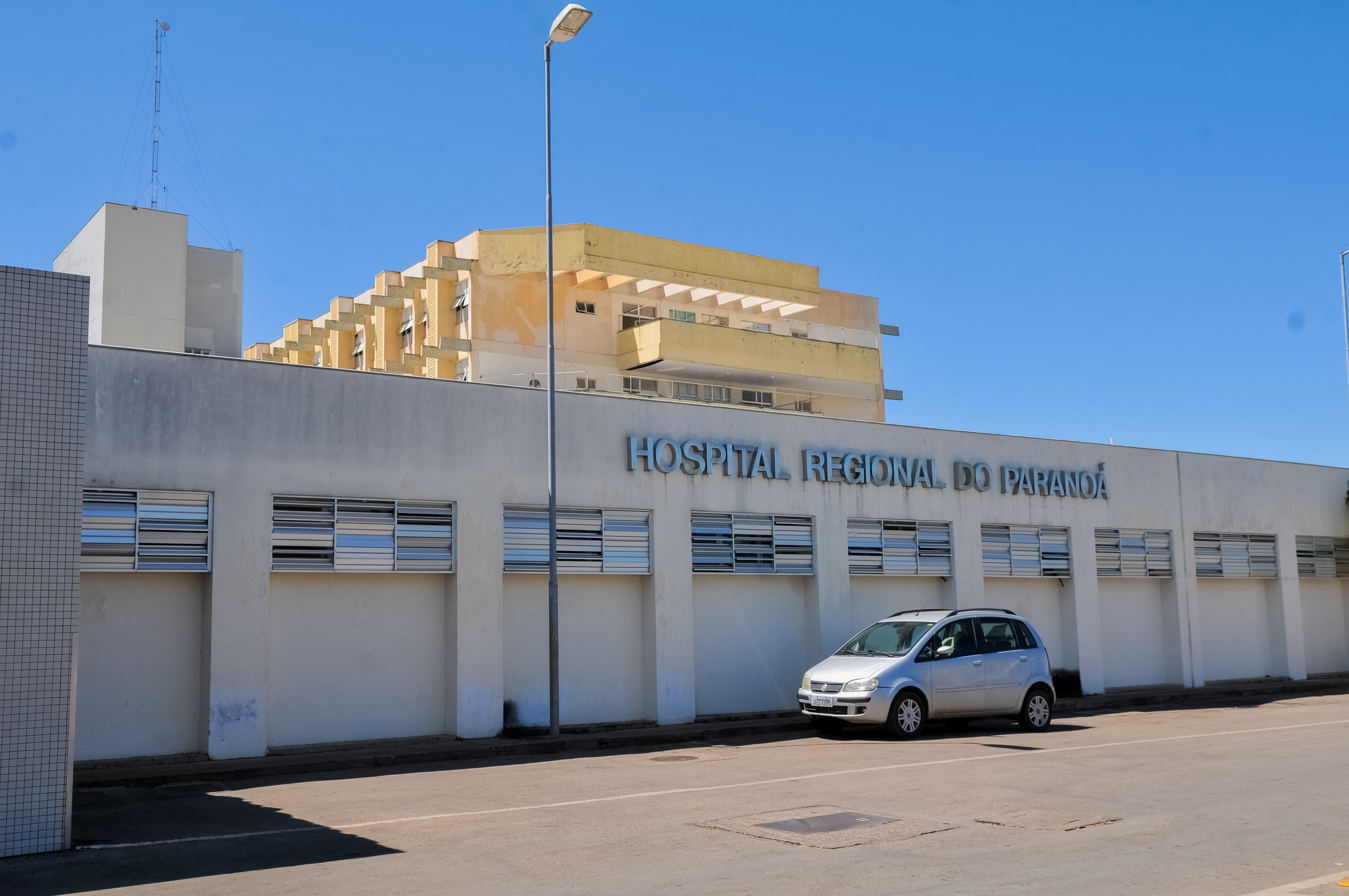
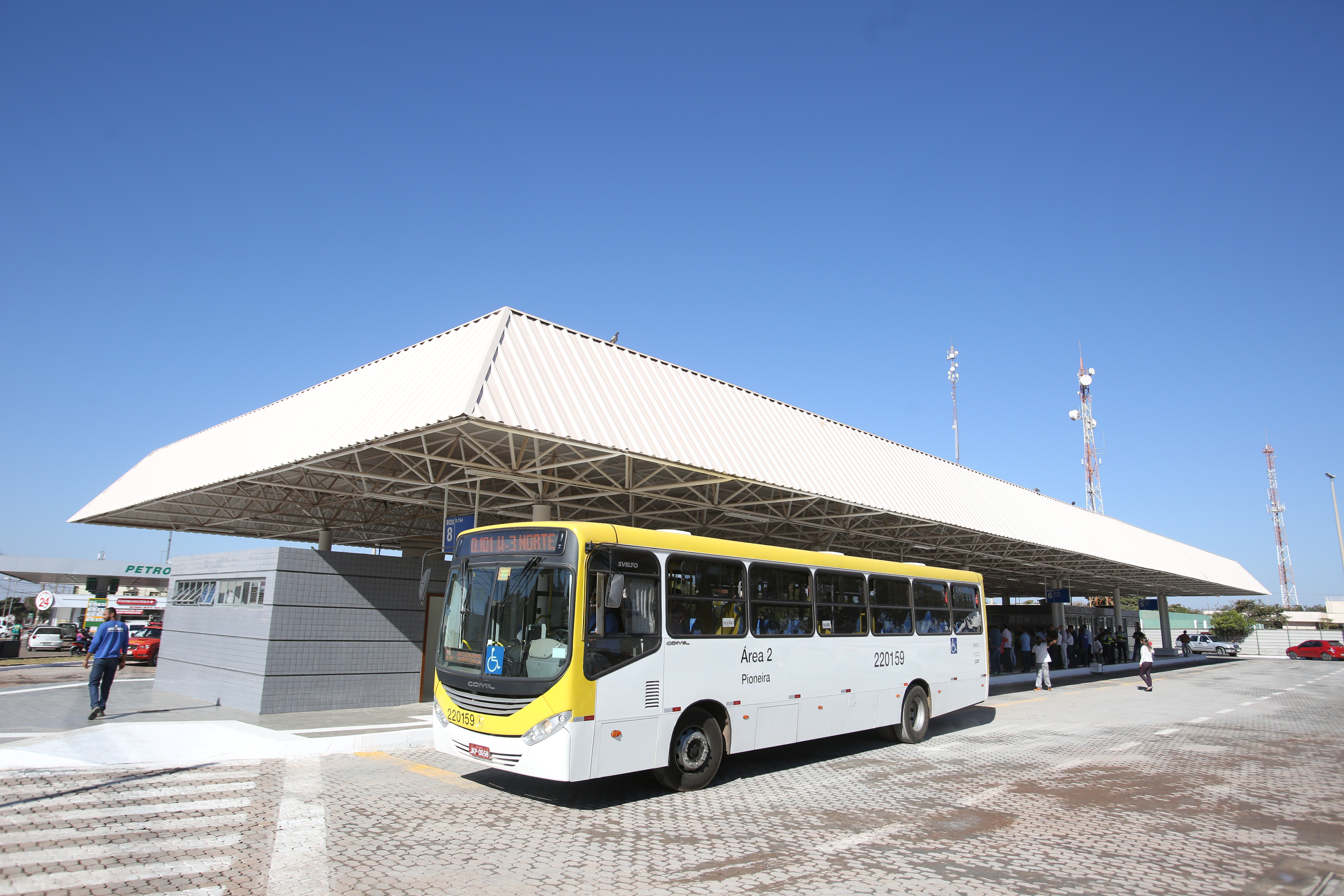
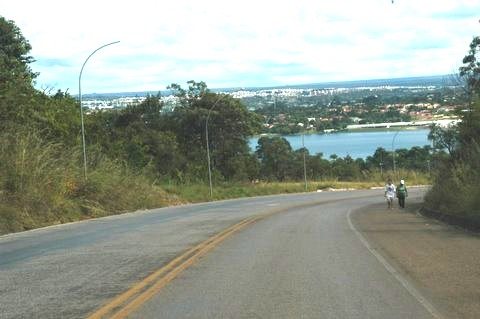
- Clockwise from top: I love Paranoá sign; Paranoá Regional Hospital; Road near Paranoá Lake; Paranoá bus terminal; Paranoá residential block

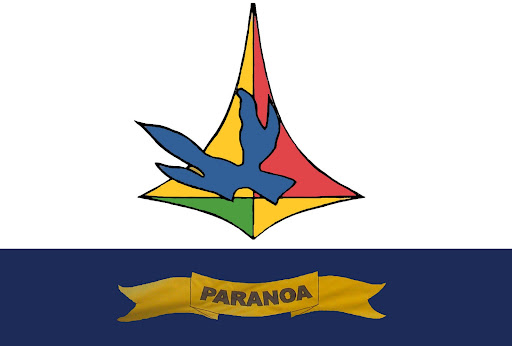
- Flag

- Localization of Paranoá in Federal District
- Coordinates: 15°46′07″S 47°46′47″W
- Country: Brazil
- Region: Central-West
- State: Federal District
- Founded: October 25, 1957; 69 years ago

Government
  - Regional administrator: Sévulo José Filho

Area
  - Total: 853.33 km^{2} (329.47 sq mi)

Population (2010)
  - Total: 46,527
- Time zone: UTC-3 (UTC-3)
  - Summer (DST): UTC-2 (UTC-2)
- Postal Code (CEP): 71570-000
- Area code: +55 61
- Website: www.paranoa.df.gov.br

Paranoá is an administrative region in the Federal District in Brazil. It is located to the east of Paranoá Lake, being bordered by Lago Norte, Itapoã and Planaltina to the north, São Sebastião and Jardim Botânico to the south. It shares a border with Lago Sul and Brasília through Paranoá Lake. Paranoá was founded on October 25, 1957, receiving the status of administrative region, according to Law 4545, of December 10, 1964. As of the 2010 census, it has a population of 46,527.

== Etymology ==
The name Paranoá comes from Paranoá Lake, which the region is located near.

== Sports ==
=== Venues ===
- Estádio JK Paranoá

=== Clubs ===
- Paranoá Esporte Clube
- Capital CF

== See also ==
- List of administrative regions of the Federal District
