= Brasília Digital TV Tower =

Coordinates: 15°41′58″S 47°49′47″W

Brasilia Digital TV Tower
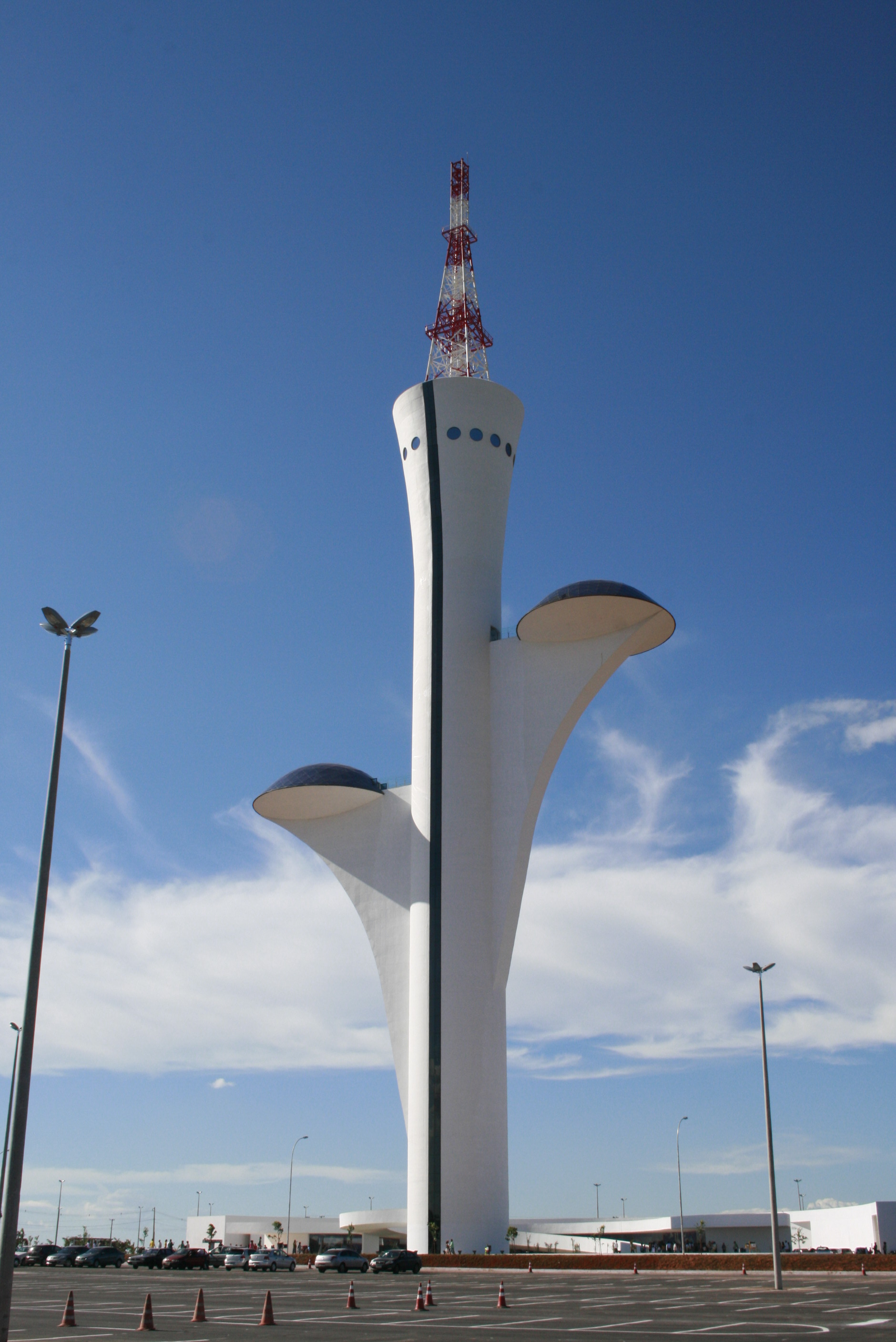
- Brasilia Digital TV Tower is a project of Brazilian architect Oscar Niemeyer, one of the remanescent architects of the modernist architecture movement
- Interactive map of the Brasilia Digital TV Tower area
- Alternative names: Flor do Cerrado (Savannah Flower)

General information
- Status: Completed
- Type: observation, telecommunications, attraction, restaurant
- Location: Lago Norte, DF, Brazil
- Construction started: 2009
- Completed: 2012

Height
- Antenna spire: 180 m (590.6 ft)
- Roof: 120 m (393.7 ft)
- Top floor: 80 m (262.5 ft)

Technical details
- Floor count: 62 (equivalent)

Design and construction
- Architect: Oscar Niemeyer

The Brasília Digital TV Tower (Portuguese: Torre de TV Digital de Brasília) is a broadcast tower which made digital television signal available for the whole Federal District and surroundings. It is also known as the “Flor do Cerrado”, the Cerrado flower. Initially planned to open to the public on April 21, 2010, as a celebration of the 50th anniversary of the City of Brasília, the tower was only inaugurated two years later on April 21, 2012.

The tower was one of the final designs of Brazilian architect Oscar Niemeyer, and cost R$75 million.

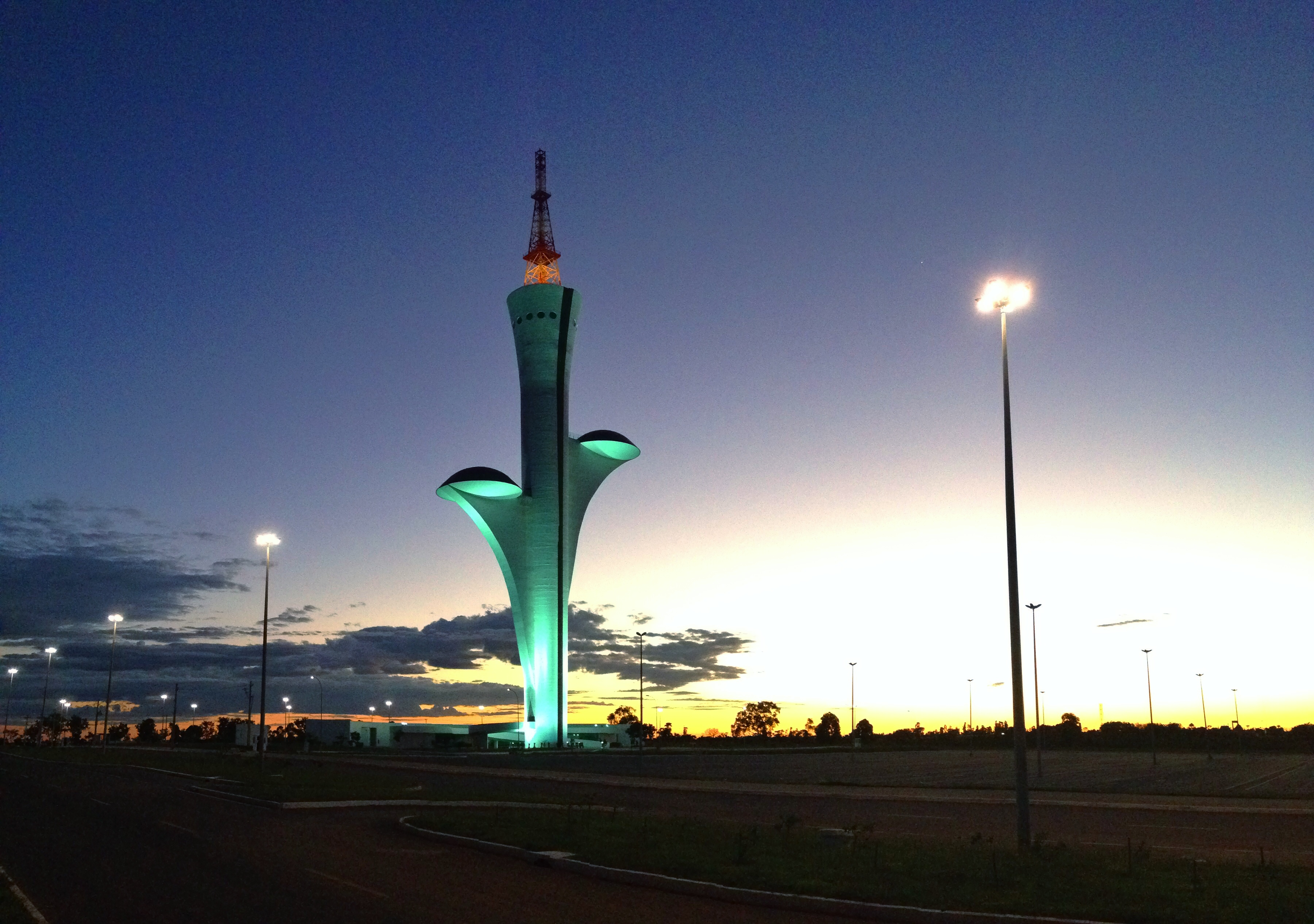
Brasilía digital TV tower at night, 2009

The tower is 182 meters tall to the top of the antenna. The enclosed building is reinforced concrete structure for 120 meters, with 50m of metallic structure above that, topped by a 12m television antenna. The main building contains two observatories. The highest one, 80 meters above the ground, contains a restaurant with a panoramic view. The other one is used as an art gallery.
