= Itapoã, Federal District =

Itapoã
- Administrative region
- Região Administrativa de Itapoã; Administrative Region of Itapoã
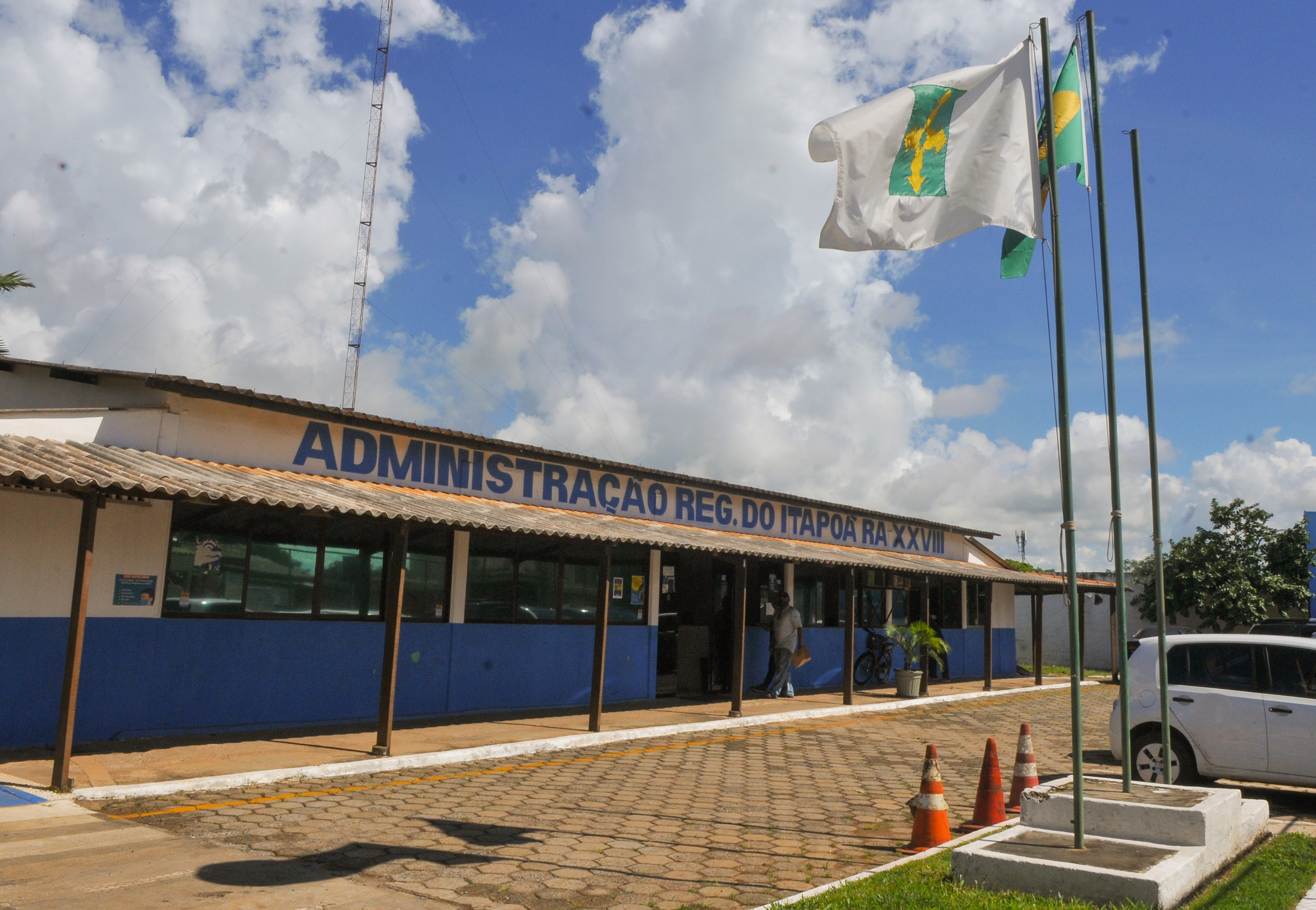
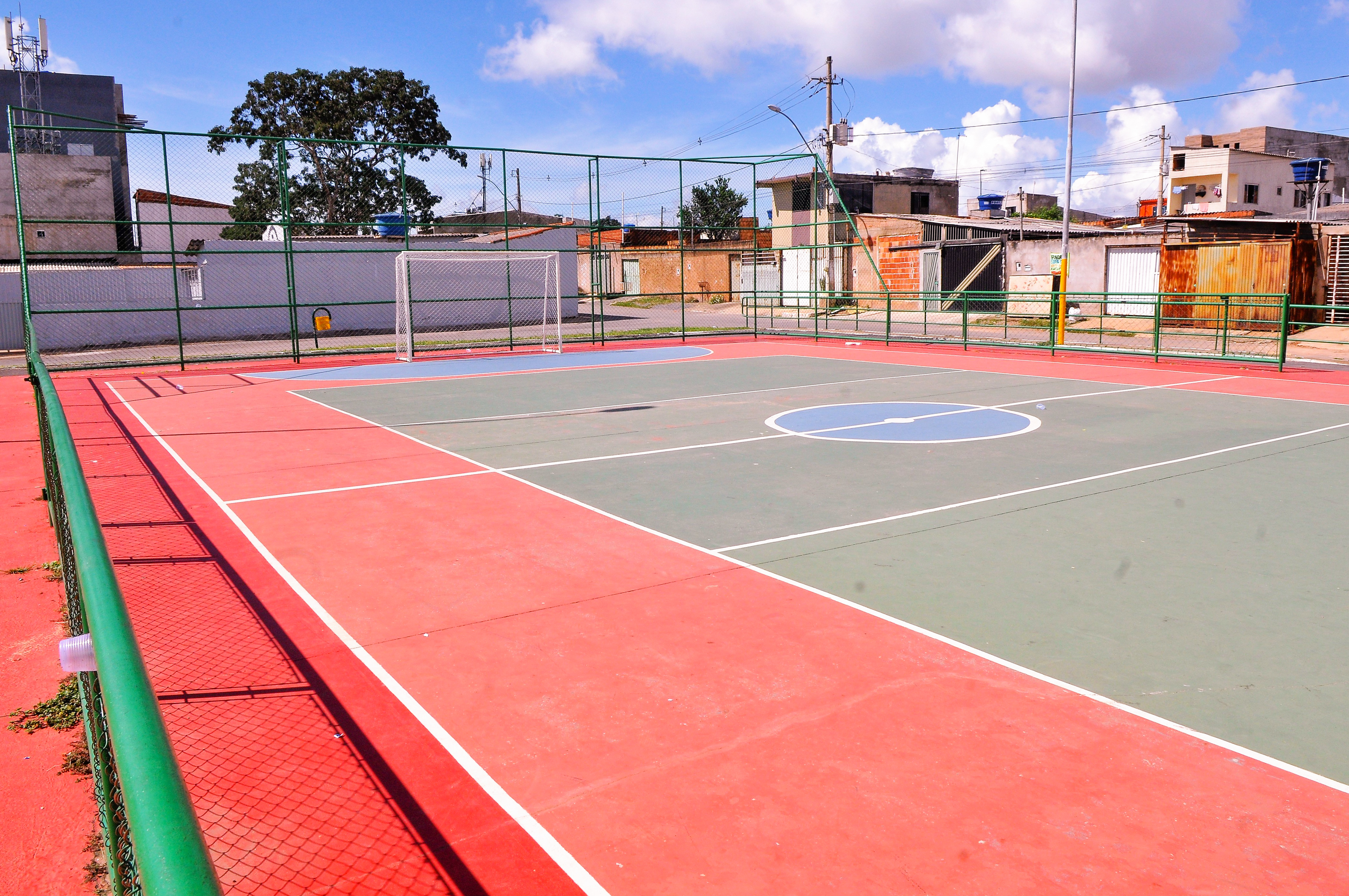
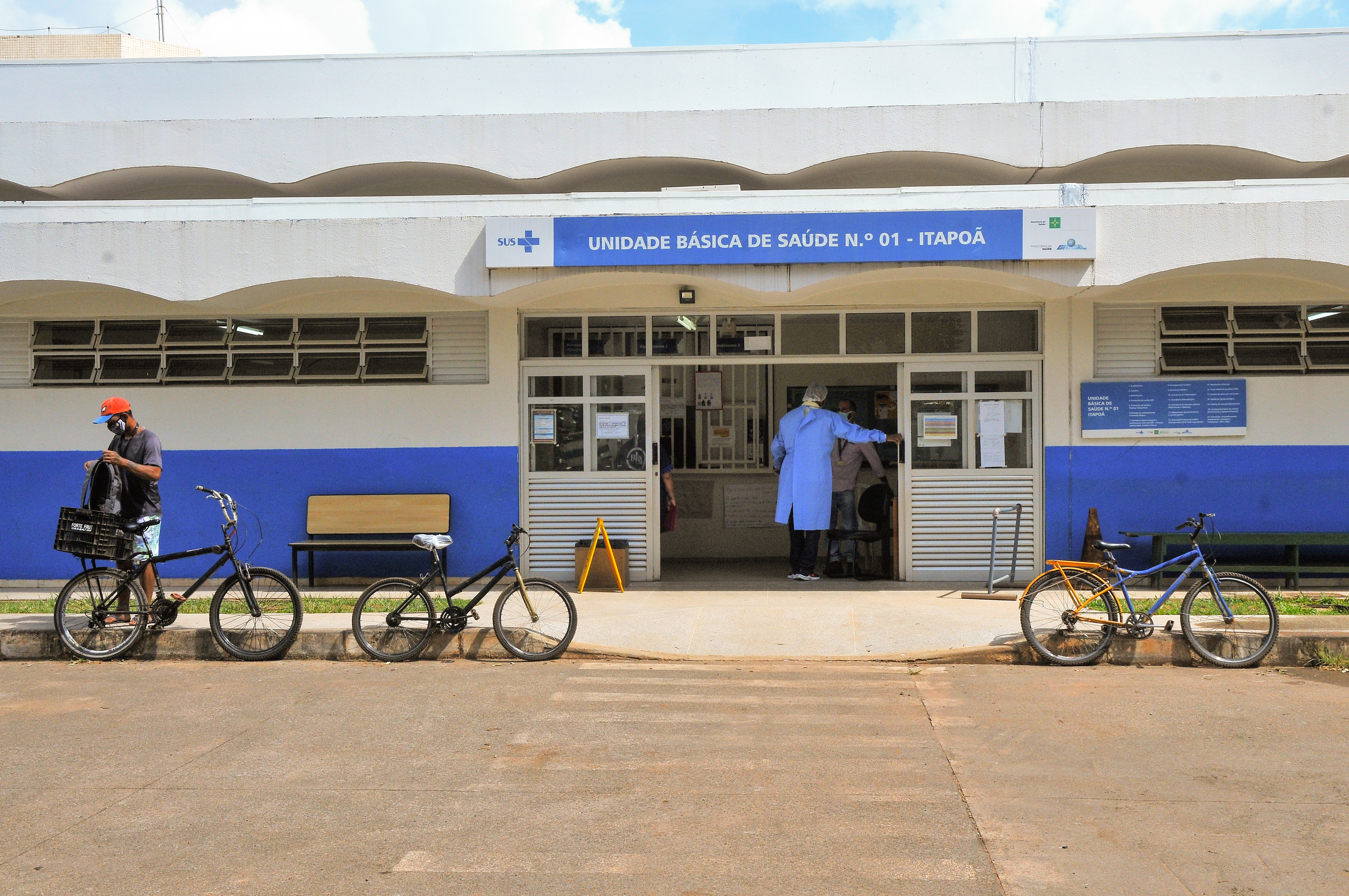
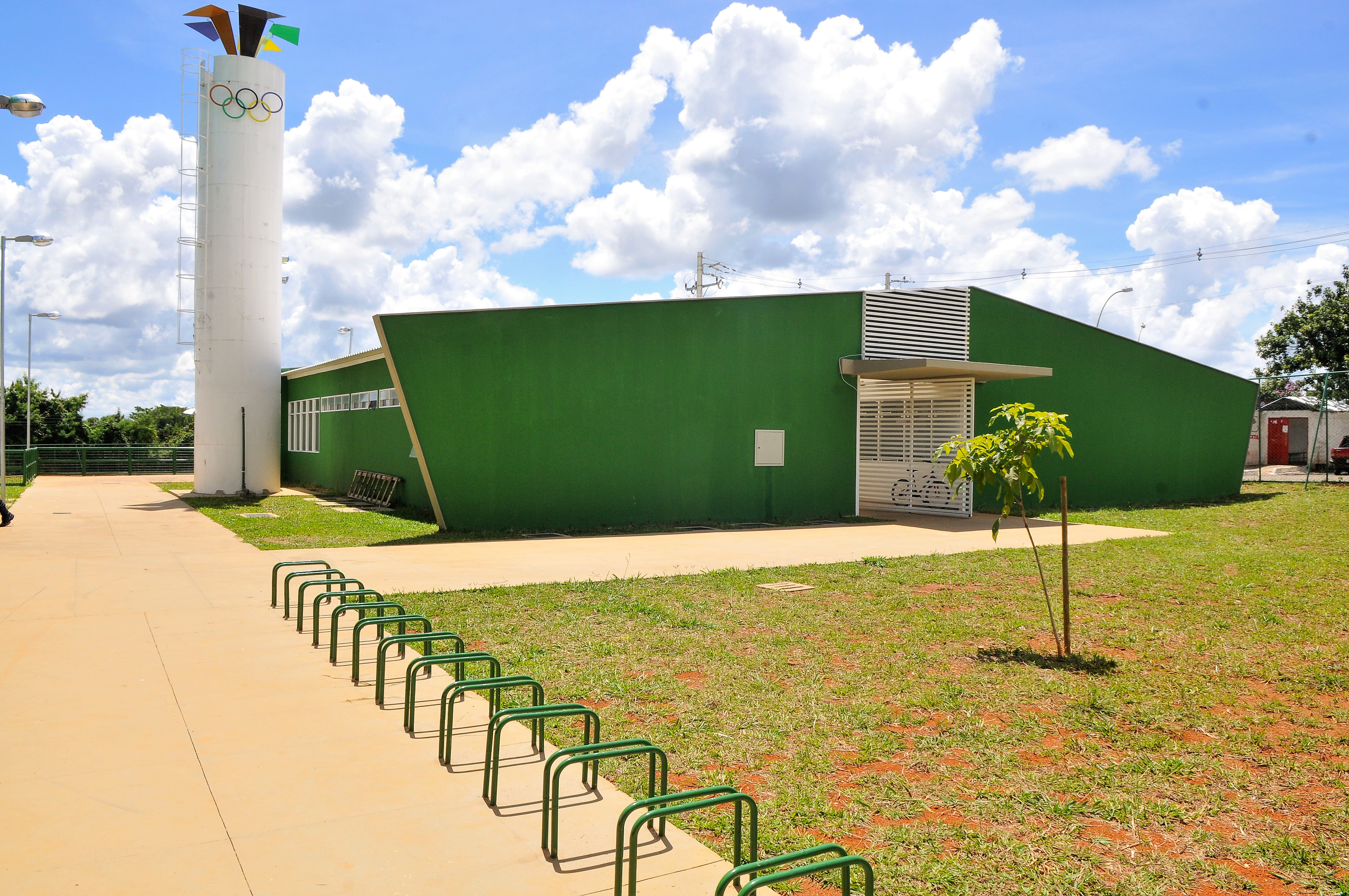
- Clockwise from top: Regional Administration, UBS 1, Olympic Village, 305 Sports Complex

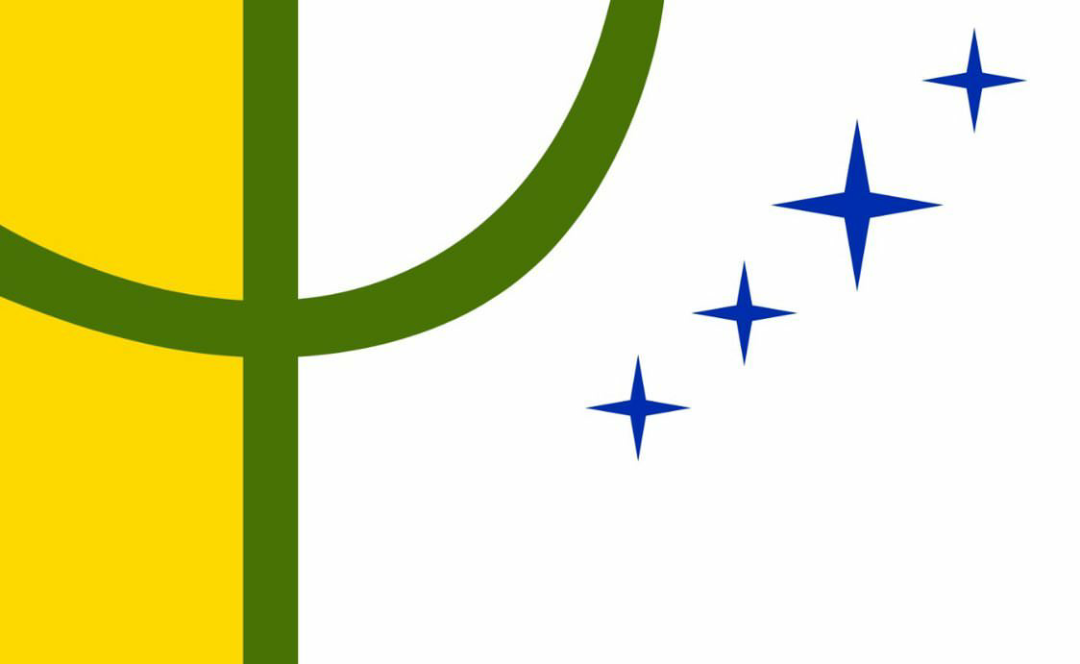
- Flag

- Location of Itapoã in the Federal District
- Coordinates: 15°44′54″S 47°46′08″W
- Country: Brazil
- Region: Central-West
- State: Federal District
- Established: January 3, 2005

Government
  - Regional administrator: Alessander Carregari Capalbo

Population
  - Total: 50,339
- Time zone: UTC−3 (BRT)
- Area code: +55 61
- Website: www.itapoa.df.gov.br

Itapoã (Portuguese pronunciation: [itapoˈɐ̃]) is an administrative region in the Federal District in Brazil. Itapoã was founded on January 3, 2005, receiving the status of administrative region, according to Law 3527, of January 3, 2005. It is bordered by Sobradinho to the north, Paranoá to the south, and Lago Norte to the west.

== See also ==
- List of administrative regions of the Federal District
