= Jure Šterk =

Slovenian long-distance sailor

- Born: 6 January 1937; Zagreb, Kingdom of Yugoslavia (today Croatia)
- Disappeared: January 2009; Indian Ocean
- Status: Lost at sea
- Call sign: S52YS

Jure Šterk (6 January 1937 – c. January 2009) was a Slovenian long-distance sailor, member of the Ocean Cruising Club, circumnavigator and author who disappeared during a sailing trip around the world and is presumed dead.

During his sailing career he crossed the Atlantic Ocean, Indian Ocean and Pacific Ocean. Between 1991 and 1994 he sailed around the world single-handedly.

== Biography ==
=== Early life ===
Šterk was born in Zagreb, which was then part of Yugoslavia. He grew up in Vinica in White Carniola and attended a high school in Črnomelj. He lived in Ljubljana for some time, and received his captain's licence in 1977.

=== Sailing achievements ===
He competed in the Minitransat transatlantic race (Transat 6,50) three times, crossed the Atlantic Ocean eight times, the Indian Ocean twice, and the Pacific Ocean once. Between 1991 and 1994, he single-handedly sailed around the world, in his own 6.5 meter-long boat. He made most of his boats himself.

=== Last journey ===
In December 2007, at age 70, Šterk left Tauranga in New Zealand to sail around the world on his boat Lunatic. He had removed the engine from the boat while living in Tauranga and said he intended to become the oldest sailor to circumnavigate the world non-stop, and in the smallest boat.

He was last heard from by radio on 1 January 2009. He was on his last leg to Tauranga to complete his circumnavigation, and had been 379 days alone at sea. Lunatic was spotted on 26 January, approximately 1,000 nmi (1,900 km) off the coast of Australia. The boat was damaged and there was no sign of Šterk.

Three months later, on 30 April 2009, Lunatic was found adrift by the crew of the science research vessel RV Roger Revelle, 500 miles (800 km) south-eastern on position: 32°18′0″S 91°07′0″E. The sails were torn and there was no one on board. After boarding, it was found that the last log entry was made on 2 January 2009.

== Bibliography ==
- Roulette on Atlantic (1985)
- Dangerous Game (1989)
- Transat 6,50 1989: The Most Dangerous Regatta Across the Big Pond (1990)
- In Wind's Embrace (1996)
- In Blue Infinity (2004)
- The Log of the Last Voyage (2011), in Slov., ed. Igor Šterk, Irena Šterk, publ Jadralni Klub Open sea, ISBN 978-961-269-545-3

== Personal life ==
His son is the Slovenian film director Igor Šterk.

== See also ==
- Ghost ship
- List of people who disappeared mysteriously at sea
- List of sailors
