= 2003 Dartford Borough Council election =

2003 UK local government election

Results of the 2003 Dartford Borough Council election

Elections to Dartford Borough Council were held on 1 May 2003. The whole council was up for election on new boundaries, which reduced the total number of seats from 47 to 44. The election in Longfield, New Barn and Southfleet ward was postponed following the death of Bob Dunn, one of the Conservative candidates. The delayed election returned three Conservative councillors, increasing their number to 21.

Labour lost their majority on the council, putting it into no overall control. The Conservatives and Swanscombe & Greenhithe Residents Association subsequently formed a coalition to control the council.

== Election result ==
Dartford Borough Council Election Result 2003
Party	Seats	Gains	Losses	Net gain/loss	Seats %	Votes %	Votes	+/−
Conservative	18			+4				
Labour	17			-12				
Liberal Democrats	0			0				
Residents	5			+3				
New England	1			+1				
Independent	0			-2				

== Ward results ==
Bean & Darenth (3)
Party	Candidate	Votes	%	±%
Conservative	Simon Roy Bull	750		
Conservative	David Alan Hammock	737		
Conservative	Ian Douglas Armitt	667		
Labour	Thomas William Cook	591		
Labour	Samson Patrick Carey	579		
Labour	Robert Finlay Carson	454		
Liberal Democrats	Tanya Jane O'Rourke	142		
UKIP	David John Kent	74		
Turnout			35.17%	

Brent (3)
Party	Candidate	Votes	%	±%
Conservative	Kenneth James Fickling	800		
Conservative	Sarah Karamuth	781		
Conservative	Nancy Catherine Wightman	779		
Labour	Michael George Dando	712		
Labour	Margaret Anne Eaton	679		
Labour	Rosemary Bryant	678		
UKIP	Peter Kenneth Overy	205		
Turnout			36.2%	

Castle (1)
Party	Candidate	Votes	%	±%
Conservative	Sheila East	130		
Liberal Democrats	Andrew Reeves	127		
Labour	Joyce Wise	57		
Turnout			31.1%	

Greenhithe (3)
Party	Candidate	Votes	%	±%
Residents	Martin Murphy	329		
Residents	Brian Barry Fitzpatrick	322		
Conservative	Conrad Broadley	316		
Residents	Vic Openshaw	290		
Conservative	Jan Michael Ozog	234		
Conservative	Rebecca Florence Storey	232		
Labour	Brian Robert Francis	196		
Labour	Michael Leonard Mahy	190		
Labour	Charles Prior	190		
UKIP	Sara Reed	43		
UKIP	Amanda Tracey Jane Fullagar	23		
Turnout			25.7%	

Heath (3)
Party	Candidate	Votes	%	±%
Conservative	Terence Charles Harry Smith	874		
Conservative	Kenneth Frank Martin Leadbeater	847		
Conservative	Patricia Anne Thurlow	788		
Labour	Patrick Kelly	486		
Labour	Marilyn Sharon May	481		
Labour	Jonathan Victor Kingston	449		
UKIP	Robert Charles Howell	261		
Liberal Democrats	Pauline Yvonne Cherek	225		
Liberal Democrats	Matthew William John Keane	224		
Turnout			35.6%	

Joyce Green (2)
Party	Candidate	Votes	%	±%
Labour	Ann Muckle	321		
Labour	Matthew James Bryant	303		
UKIP	Raymond Peter Day	191		
UKIP	Mark Christopher Croucher	177		
Conservative	Brian Garden	90		
Conservative	Amy Elizabeth Peters	87		
Turnout			24.9%	

Joydens Wood (3)
Party	Candidate	Votes	%	±%
Conservative	Ann Dorothy Allen	1,060		
Conservative	Marilyn Iris Peters	1,056		
Conservative	Jennifer Ann Rickwood	1,050		
Labour	Valerie Maddison	398		
Labour	Stephen John Sherrell	367		
Labour	Julian Timothy Bryant	362		
UKIP	Arnold Edwin Tarling	126		
Turnout			34.6%	

Littlebrook (2)
Party	Candidate	Votes	%	±%
Labour	John Ivan Muckle	321		
New England	Michael Terrence Tibby	276		
Labour	Stephen Robert David de Winton	271		
Conservative	Terrence Raymond Martin	131		
Conservative	David Matthew Pickersgill	123		
UKIP	Edward Llewellyn	117		
UKIP	Gordon Thomas Patrick Mayell	88		
Turnout			25.9%	

Newtown (3)
Party	Candidate	Votes	%	±%
Labour	David John Baker	661		
Labour	Austen Raymond Brooker	614		
Labour	Graham Christopher David Steele	536		
Conservative	Robert John Etheridge	432		
Conservative	Andrew Ronald Lloyd	415		
Conservative	Avtar Singh Sandhu	399		
UKIP	Quentin Williamson	157		
Turnout			24.8%	

Princes (3)
Party	Candidate	Votes	%	±%
Labour	David Edward May	661		
Labour	Margaret Anne Stock	614		
Labour	Victor William Stock	595		
Conservative	Susan Elizabeth Martin	284		
Conservative	David Alistair Strachan	267		
Conservative	Edna May Oborne	252		
UKIP	Michael Robert Wiltshire	221		
UKIP	Suzanne Louise Wiltshire	205		
Turnout			25.4%	

Stone (3)
Party	Candidate	Votes	%	±%
Labour	Ivor Thomas Noel Jones	601		
Labour	Derek Ernest Lawson	540		
Labour	Bryan Jones	517		
Conservative	Barbara Gladys May Bell	223		
Conservative	Doreen Edna Coleman	197		
Conservative	Sheree Gail Mary Cox	191		
UKIP	Jeffrey William Robert Reed	100		
Turnout			20.3%	

Sutton-at-Hone and Hawley (2)
Party	Candidate	Votes	%	±%
Conservative	Patrick Francis Coleman	875		
Conservative	Anthony Robert Martin	789		
Labour	Anne Elizabeth Burke	266		
Labour	Jacqueline Lineham	247		
Turnout			35.7%	

Swanscombe (3)
Party	Candidate	Votes	%	±%
Residents	Bryan Ernest Read	628		
Residents	Leslie James Bobby	528		
Residents	John Alfred Hayes	473		
Labour	Howard Graham Dold	455		
Independent (politician)	Michael Arthur Crosby	419		
Labour	Derek Alexander Hills	312		
Labour	Angela Margaret Mahy	290		
Conservative	Richard Stewart Mortimer Green	71		
Conservative	Joyce Edna Kite	68		
Conservative	Murdo Macleod	59		
Turnout			27.5%	

Town (2)
Party	Candidate	Votes	%	±%
Labour	Dharma Ramdass Appadoo	244		
Labour	Trevor Alan Rogers	239		
Conservative	Christopher Jon Shippam	239		
Conservative	Gary Leigh Shippam	176		
Liberal Democrats	Anthony Easto	127		
UKIP	Alan John Rice	75		
Turnout			23.2%	

West Hill (3)
Party	Candidate	Votes	%	±%
Labour	Deborah Jane Stoate	736		
Labour	Geoffrey Truscott Prout	714		
Labour	Francis Gerald Byrne	706		
Conservative	Matthew John Davis	673		
Conservative	Josephine Anne Shippam	657		
Conservative	Teresa Wells	637		
Liberal Democrats	Sonia Elizabeth Keane	413		
Liberal Democrats	Frida Melillo	394		
Liberal Democrats	Adam Keith Gebbett	388		
UKIP	Thomas Geoffrey Roach	77		
Turnout			46.6%	

Wilmington (2)
Party	Candidate	Votes	%	±%
Conservative	Derek Edward Hunnisett	870		
Conservative	Edward John Lampkin	809		
Labour	Thomas Anthony Maddison	564		
Labour	Christine Settle	536		
Turnout			46.5%	
