= Lago Norte =

- Administrative region
- Região Administrativa de Lago Norte; Administrative Region of Lago Norte
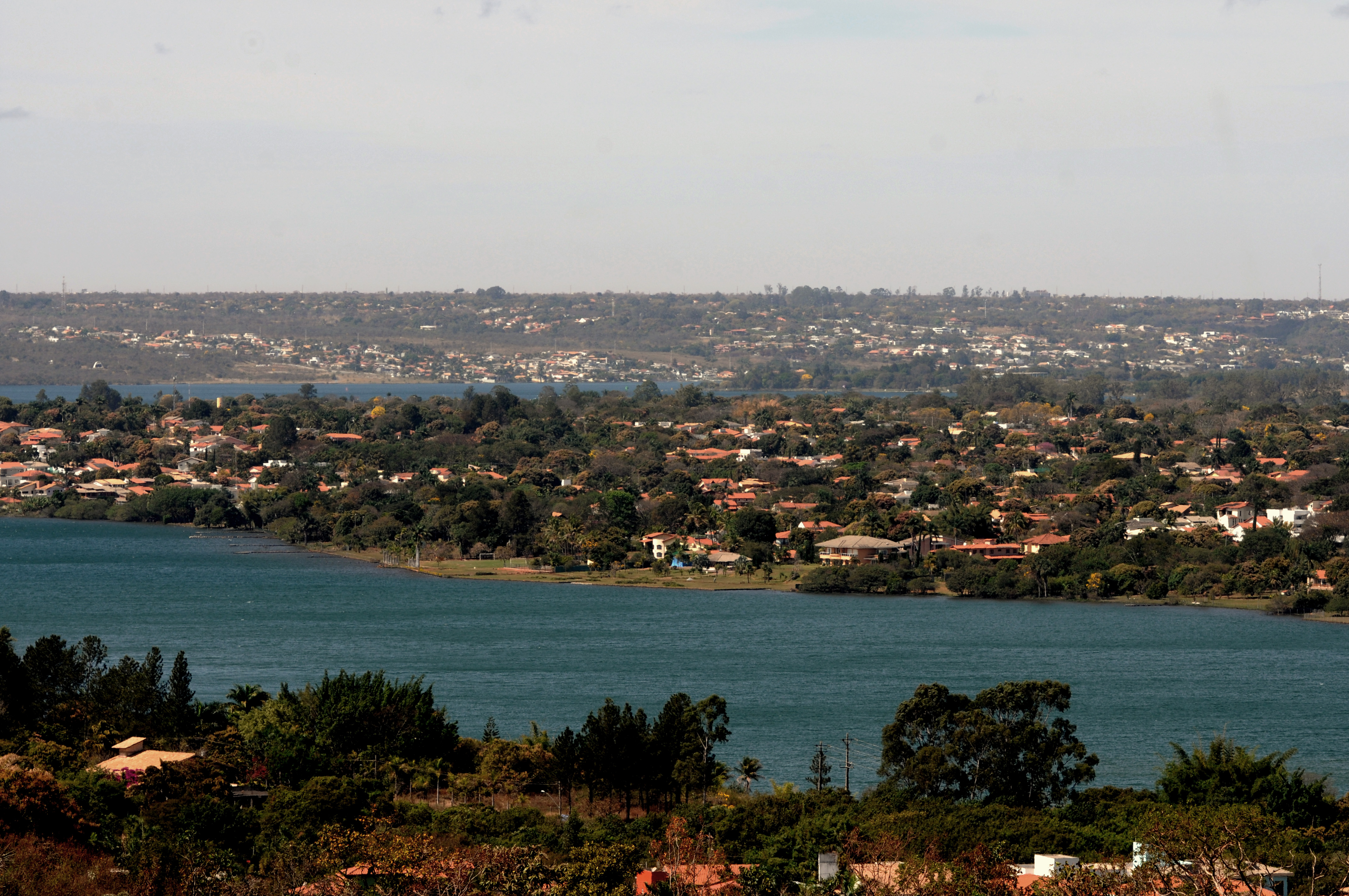
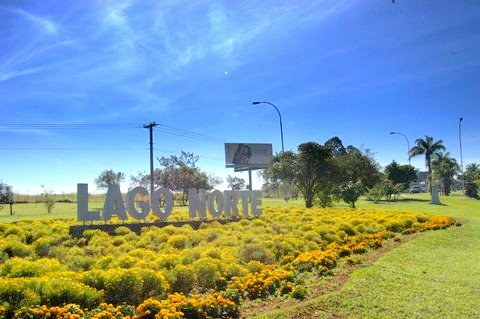
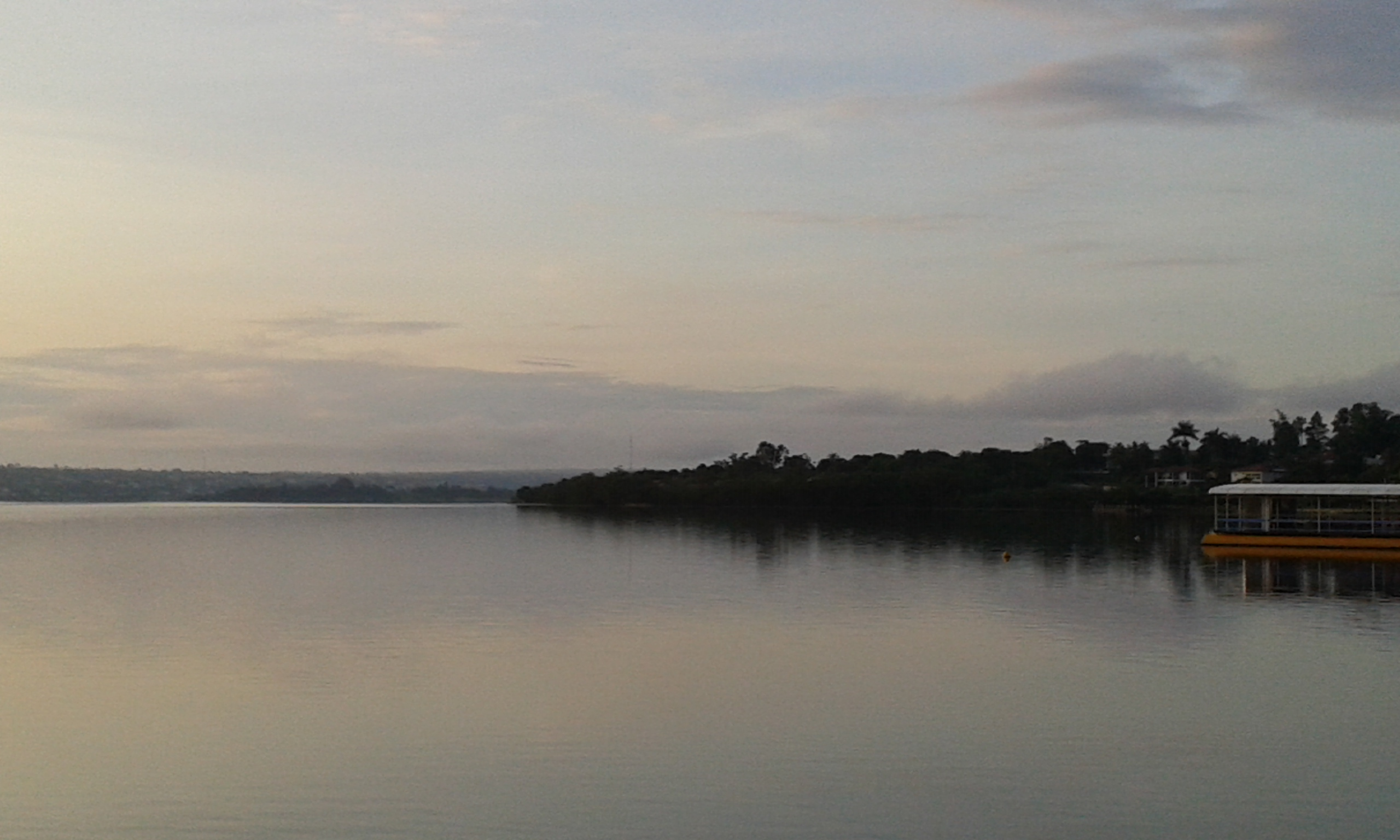
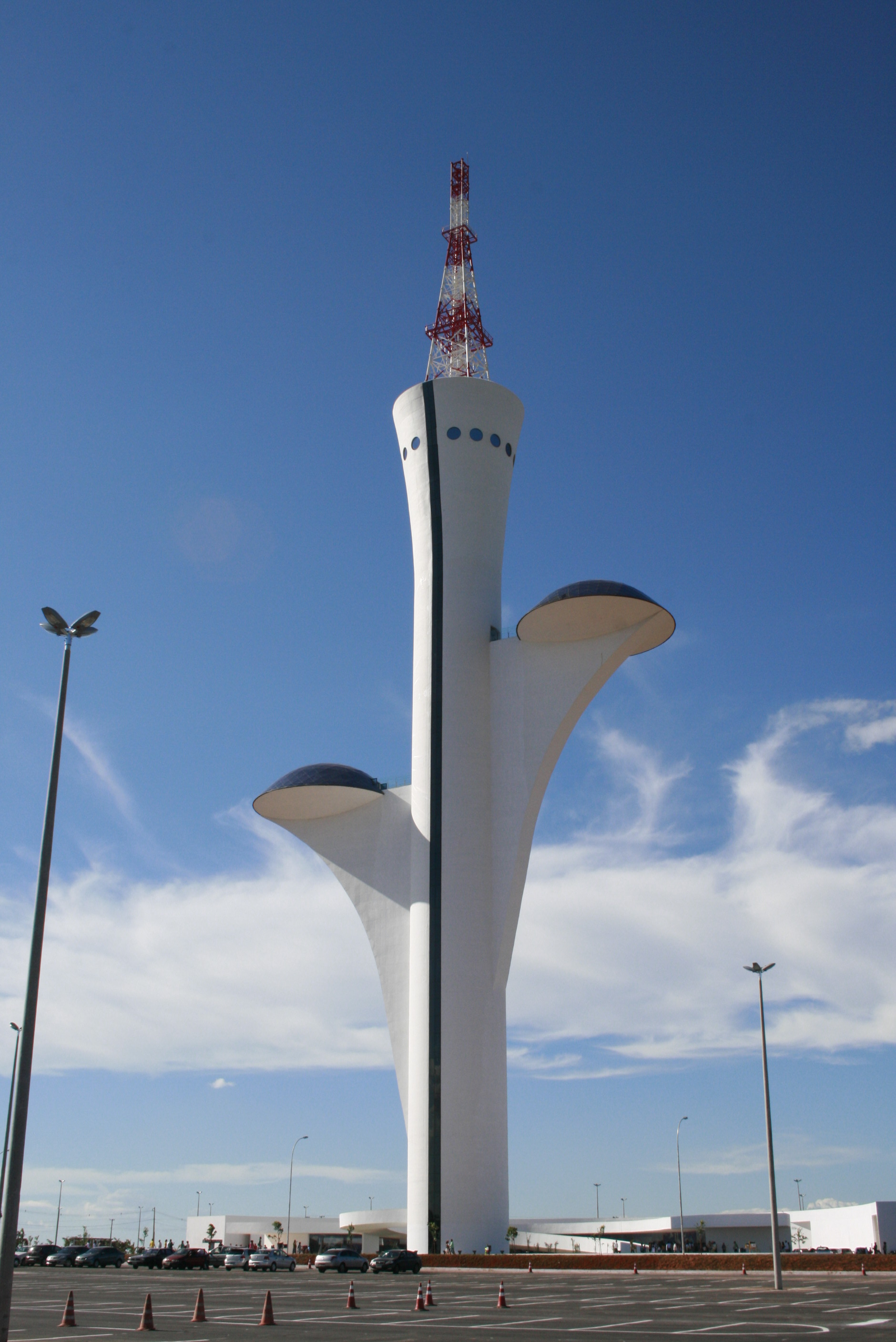
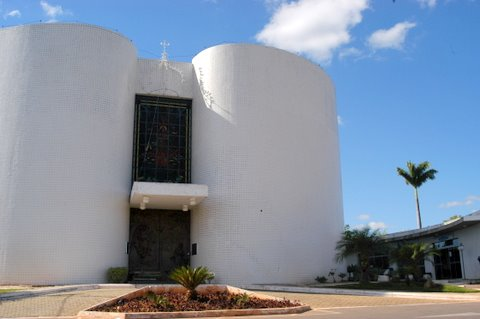
- Clockwise from top: Lago Norte; Paranoá Lake; Nossa Senhora do Rosário Church; Brasília Digital TV Tower; Entrance to Lago Norte

- Location in the Federal District
- Coordinates: 15°44′19″S 47°51′34″W
- Country: Brazil
- Region: Central-West
- State: Federal District
- Established: January 10, 1960

Area
  - Total: 6,608 km^{2} (2,551 sq mi)

Population (2010)
  - Total: 41,627
- Time zone: UTC−3 (BRT)
- Area code: +55 61
- Website: www.lagonorte.df.gov.br

Lago Norte (Portuguese pronunciation: [laɡu nɔʁtʃi]; lit. North Lake) is an administrative region in the Federal District in Brazil. Located to the north side of Paranoá Lake, it is bordered by Brasília, Sobradinho II, and Sobradinho to the north, Itapoã and Paranoá to the east. Lago Norte shares a maritime border with Lago Sul, Paranoá, and Brasília through the Paranoá Lake. It completely surrounds the administrative region of Varjão. Most of its inhabited area is located on a peninsula of Lake Paranoá. Lago Norte is home to the Brasília Digital TV Tower. Lago Norte was founded on January 10, 1960, receiving the status of administrative region, according to Law 641, of January 10, 1994. In a 2010 report, its population was 41,627. Its current administrator is Marcelo Ferreira da Silva.

== Transport ==
Lago Norte has the third largest network of bike lanes in the Federal District, having 35,1km of bike lanes.

== See also ==
- List of administrative regions of the Federal District
