= Altineu Pires =

Altineu Miguens Pires
- Occupations: Teacher of navigation, Author
- Known for: Books on sailing, Navigation assistance

Altineu Miguens Pires was a teacher of navigation. He wrote many books on the art of sailing and also assisted the Navy of Brazil in preparing various charts, among them Lake Paranoá. He was commander of the Oceanographic Ship Alvaro Alberto, which at the time had just been incorporated into the Navy of Brazil. This ship served in Antarctica, under his able command.
