= Mark Croucher =

British journalist (born 1966)

Personal details
- Born: 13 March 1966 (age 60) Greenwich, Connecticut, US
- Occupation: Political consultant, journalist

Mark Christopher Croucher (born 13 March 1966, Greenwich, Connecticut, US), is a freelance journalist and political consultant particularly associated with the UK Independence Party (UKIP). In January 2015 he was elected president of the Chartered Institute of Journalists, having previously been elected to the institute's governing council from 2003 to 2007 and from 2013 to 2015. He was president of the institute from 2016 to 2018.

== Early life ==
Croucher was born in Greenwich, Connecticut, US to British parents. His father Peter John Croucher was an engineer, and his mother Mary Florence (née Dunn) was a legal secretary. His parents re-emigrated back to the United Kingdom in 1971, when Croucher was five years old. He has a younger brother, Paul Stephen Croucher (born 1970). He was educated at St Paulinus Church of England Primary School, Crayford, Kent, and then at the City of London School, London, which he attended on a scholarship as a chorister at the Temple Church under choirmaster Sir George Thalben-Ball, appearing on two records made by the choir during his time there. He had previously sung in the St Paulinus Church choir, Crayford, and the Westminster Abbey Special Choir.

On leaving school at the age of 16, he attended Erith College (now Bexley College) for a year before enlisting in the United States Air Force at the age of 17, where he served for three years as a radio operator before taking an early discharge and returning to the UK to attend Merchant Navy College (formerly the Thames Nautical Training College), Greenhithe, Kent, qualifying as a Radio Officer in 1989. He first became involved in politics during this period, leading the ultimately unsuccessful campaign to prevent the closure of the college in 1989.

Working mainly for Dutch shipping companies, he volunteered for service in the First Gulf War and served on an ammunition transport as a Chief Radio Officer. During this period he continued his studies using distance learning, gaining a degree in electronics engineering, and also worked as a freelance journalist.

== Political career ==
In 2001, he was employed by UKIP as its sole press officer and de facto Director of Communications, with him adopting the formal title in 2002 under new leader Roger Knapman as the party expanded. At the 2001 general election he contested the Dartford parliamentary constituency for UKIP, coming fourth with 989 votes.

In 2003, Croucher led the party's decision to contest local elections, writing its first local election manifesto – which still forms the backbone of the current manifesto. He himself stood in the staunchly Labour Joyce Green ward for Dartford Borough Council in 2003, polling 31% of the vote in the multiseat ward.

In 2004, he was in charge of media strategy for the party's 2004 European election campaign which saw the party break through from its existing three MEP seats to 12, gaining 16.8% of the national vote and beating the Liberal Democrats into fourth place. By focussing on large set-piece events with a central theme, and by carefully deploying high-profile candidates (including Robert Kilroy-Silk) and supporters, he generated significant media interest in the campaign, which represented a break from previous UKIP efforts. Throughout this period he worked closely with Clive Page (at that time a consultant, and later deputy director of communications), with external advice from PR guru Max Clifford, who had declared his support for UKIP early in the campaign. Page was a former Head of News for ITV Tyne Tees television. Croucher also worked closely with UKIP Head of Strategy Dick Morris, who joined the campaign team in late 2003.

Following the election, he was appointed editor of UKIPs internal magazine, Independence News, updating the style and content of the magazine as its circulation reached a peak of 29,000. He remained editor until 2007.

Croucher stood down as director of communications in 2007, but returned in 2009 as a consultant for the European election campaign of that year. After UKIP came second, he was appointed as Head of Media for UKIP's new grouping in the European Parliament, the Europe of Freedom and Democracy Group, in which position he continued until 2011. Since then, he has worked as a consultant for several of the party's MEPs.

=== Chartered Institute of Journalists ===
In January 2015, Croucher was elected vice president of the Chartered Institute of Journalists in an election caused by the elevation of previous vice president Paul Leighton to the presidency following the death in office in January 2014 of President Charlie Harris. Croucher assumed the presidency in January 2016 after a shortened vice presidency of one year and is currently the immediate past president. Croucher had contested the first elections for the national council of the Chartered Institute of Journalists in 2003 and was elected. He defended his position in 2005, but did not seek re-election in 2007. He successfully stood for election to council in February 2013.

== Notes ==
- Gardner, Dr Peter (2006): Hard Pounding: the story of the UK Independence Party, June Press
