= Lake Paranoá =

Lake Paranoa
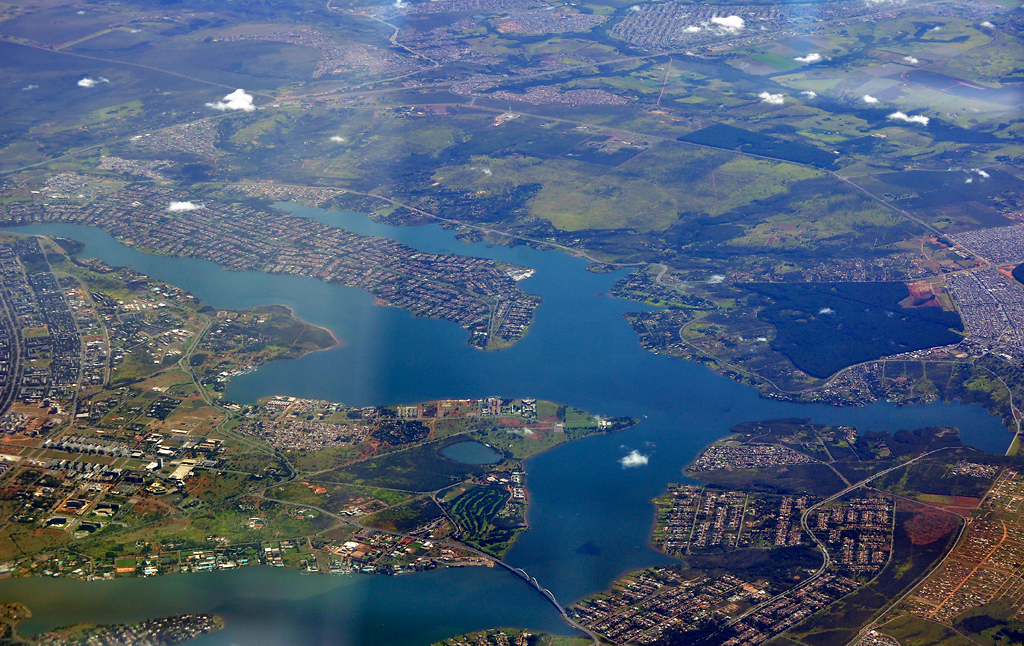
- Aerial view, the Juscelino Kubitschek bridge can be seen at the far bottom

- Location within Brazil
- Interactive map of Lake Paranoa
- Location: Brasília
- Coordinates: 15°46′50″S 47°49′21″W
- Type: artificial lake
- Primary inflows: Ribeirão do Torto, Ribeirão do Gama, Ribeirão Riacho Fundo, Ribeirão Bananal
- Basin countries: Brazil
- Surface area: 48 km^{2} (19 sq mi)
- Average depth: 12 m (39 ft)
- Max. depth: 38 m (125 ft)
- Shore length^{1}: 80 km (50 mi)
- Surface elevation: 1,000 metres (3,300 ft)
- Islands: Ilha do Paranoá; Ilha do Retiro; Ilha dos Clubes
- ^{1} Shore length is not a well-defined measure.

Lake Paranoá (Portuguese: Lago Paranoá, pronounced [ˈlagu paɾɐnuˈa, -no-]) is an artificial lake in Brasília, the capital of Brazil. During construction of the city, the Paranoá River was dammed to form the lake. It is at an altitude of 1,000 metres (3,300 ft) and has a circumference of 80 km (50 mi). On its shores are embassies and consulates, sports clubs, restaurants, the residential areas of Lago Sul and Lago Norte, the University of Brasília, the Olympic Center, and the Palácio da Alvorada, the official residence of the president of Brazil.

== Etymology ==
"Paranoá" is a word of Tupi origin. It means "sea cove", from the combination of the terms paranã ("sea") and kûá ("cove").

== Islands ==
The lake has three islands which are ecological reserves:

English name	Portuguese name	Image	Location	Approx. Size	Coordinates
Paranoá Island	Ilha do Paranoá		Near Trechos 4 & 5 of the Lago Norte neighborhood	1.54 hectares	15°44′33″S 47°49′57″W
Retiro Island	Ilha do Retiro		Near Trecho 7 of the Lago Norte neighborhood	1.0 hectare	15°45′32″S 47°49′15″W
Clubes Island	Ilha dos Clubes		Near the Juscelino Kubitschek Bridge	6m²	15°49′14″S 47°49′56″W

== Sport ==
Paranoá was set to be host to the 2024 World Aquatics High Diving World Cup, but the event was cancelled due to safety concerns.

== See also ==
- Altineu Pires, prepared Lake Paranoá charts for Brazilian Navy
- Lake Burley Griffin, artificial lake of Canberra, Australia's capital
