= Hundred Rabbits =

Two-person art collective

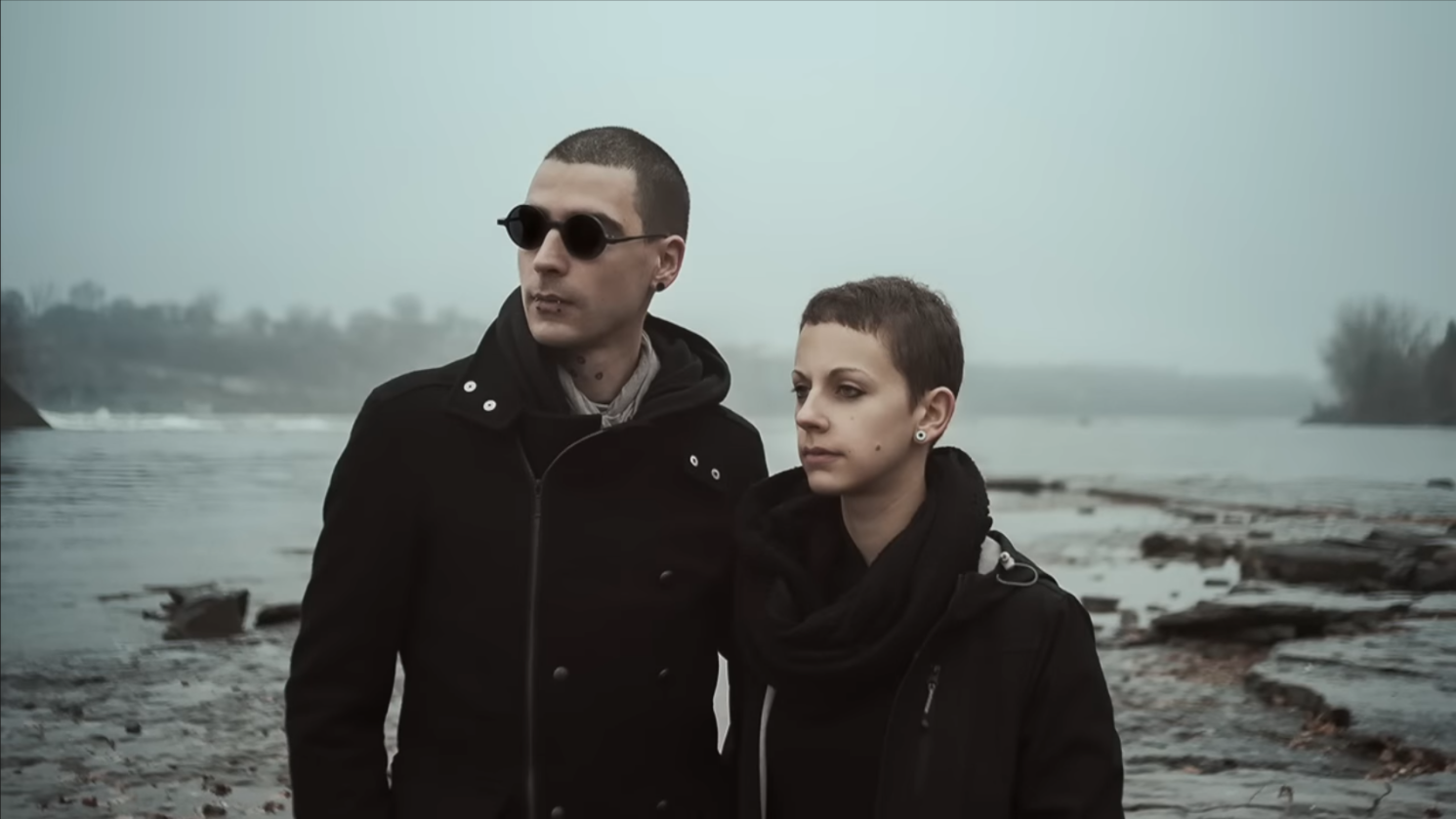
- Devine Lu Linvega (left) and Rek Bell (right)
- Occupations: Video game development, software development, illustration
- Years active: 2014–present
- Notable work: Oquonie; Uxn/Varvara
- Website: 100r.ca xxiivv.com (Linvega) kokorobot.ca (Bell)

Hundred Rabbits, also stylized as 100 Rabbits or 100R, is a two-person art collective of Devine Lu Linvega and Rek Bell, creating video games and software. Within the collective, Linvega is a programmer and musician, and Bell is an illustrator. Hundred Rabbits is known for living and working from a sailboat in the northern Pacific Ocean and their projects which have been designed to work within the limitations of living at sea.

Among their projects includes the Uxn/Varvara personal computing stack based on a small virtual machine used to build portable software in the assembly language Uxntal.

== Background ==
Hundred Rabbits is a two-person art collective of Devine Lu Linvega and Rek Bell. Both Linvega and Bell are Canadian in origin. Prior to 2015, Linvega and Bell lived in Japan, where they first met. Linvega was living in Japan on a work visa at the time, for which they (Note: Both Linvega and Bell use singular they pronouns.) were denied renewal that year. After losing their visa, Linvega and Bell decided to return to their hometown of Montreal. Linvega and Bell are a couple.

=== Devine Lu Linvega ===
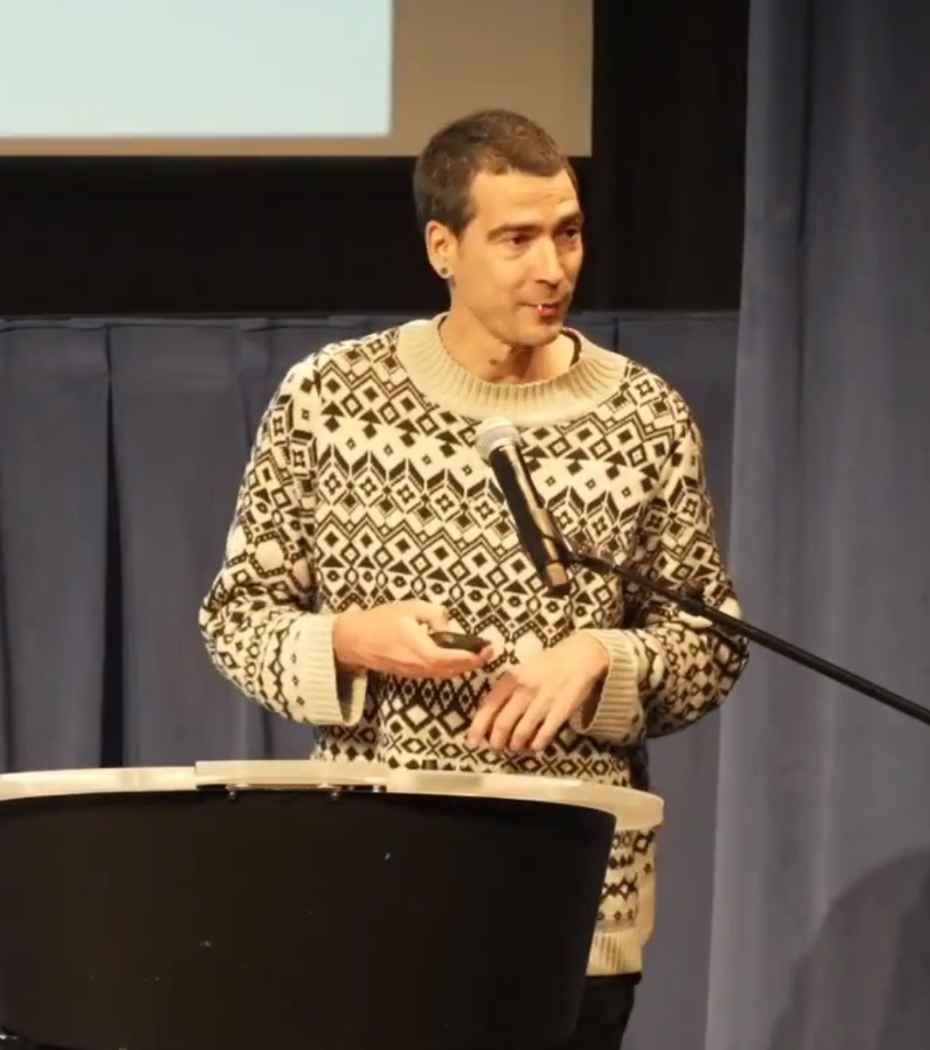
Devine Lu Linvega giving a talk in 2022

Linvega was a web developer and works as a video game developer as a part of Hundred Rabbits. Outside their work in software, Linvega also creates music under the name "Aliceffekt".

=== Rek Bell ===
Bell is an illustrator and a writer. They are non-binary.

== History ==
In January 2016, Linvega and Bell left their apartment in Montreal to move onto a liveaboard sailboat docked in Victoria, British Columbia. They decided to document their lives and work in hopes of inspiring others to find ways to practice resiliency in their lives. They named their sailboat "Pino" after the cyberpunk character of the same name from the anime Ergo Proxy. Pino is a 10-meter, fiberglass, 1982 Yamaha sailboat, costing $38,000 at purchase. Linvega and Bell each took out a bank loan to cover the purchase of the boat. At the time, Hundred Rabbits was being financed by 170 supporters on Patreon.

Hundred Rabbits has said their decision to move offshore was inspired by watching liveaboard videos online and their desire to live more sustainably, using little electricity. Linvega has also said they wanted to find a way to live a mobile and minimalist lifestyle following their frustration with living a sedentary life, the need to relocate their belongings and to go through the process of acquiring and renewing visas during travels.

After buying Pino, they sought to remove any technology they were concerned they would be unable to repair mid-journey, including their refrigerator and hot water tank. Neither Linvega or Bell had experience as sailors prior to them moving onto Pino.

During the first six months of their travels they sailed around the Canadian Pacific coast near British Columbia. They had planned a four-week trip to Hawaii starting Canada Day, however, after a storm complicated their plans they decided to travel south to San Francisco and then Mexico. They later travelled to French Polynesia, Japan, and then back to the Canadian Pacific coast.

In 2017, Hundred Rabbits shifted to find new approaches for their work after their struggle to download the latest version of Xcode, an integrated development environment required for developing software for Apple platforms. While the update was 10GB, each SIM card they owned only offered them 5GB of cellular data. To get the download to work, they needed to put their phone in a plastic bag and hoist it up onto the mast, effectively using their boat as a large antenna. To complete the whole download, they would lower their phone from the mast, swap out the SIM card with a replacement, and hoist it up again to resume downloading. This process was fragile and time-consuming, as any errors would force them to start over.

Hundred Rabbits initially considered building on the Nintendo Entertainment System as a simple and offline-first platform which could be emulated on modern computers, before creating the Uxn virtual platform and Varvara portable computing system. Uxn attracted a small community of developers seeking to use it to create tools and games, citing the platform's simplicity and accessibility.

By 2020, Hundred Rabbits had travelled to California, Mexico and Japan by sailboat. As of 2025 the collective continued to live off-shore, generally around the north Pacific.

== Projects ==
=== Oquonie ===
Oquonie was the first video game that Linvega and Bell created together. First released on 14 February 2014 as an iOS app, Oquonie is an isometric game where you explore a non-Euclidean maze controlling a character who can change shape in order to access new spaces. The other characters the player meets speak in a fictional symbolic language called Camilare. The game was illustrated by Bell.

=== Markl ===
Markl is a turn-based puzzle platformer. The game, which was inspired by Linvega and Bell's experience trying to understand the Japanese manual that came with Pino, uses a fictional language that the player has to try to interpret using context clues.

=== Uxn and Varvara ===
Uxn is a simple virtual machine and Varvara is a portable computing system built on top of it. Uxn can run on old and low-powered devices, such as the Nintendo DS, Game Boy Advance and Raspberry Pi Pico

Programs for Uxn work like video game ROMs and are written in an assembly language known as Uxntal, or TAL. The build of the Uxn desktop emulator distributed by Hundred Rabbits ships with several programs including tools for writing, sketching, and music creation. Additional programs have been developed by the Uxn community.

=== Orca ===
Orca is an experimental audio sequencer. Developed by Linvega, the project was initially created to suit their particular needs as a musician.

== Style and philosophy ==
Hundred Rabbits creates games based on their experiences as seafarers. Their work has an emphasis on storytelling, particularly through illustrations created by Bell.

=== Low technology ===
Their video games are low-tech, which manifests in their use of colour and music. Additionally, all their games require no internet-access as they run entirely offline.

Their use of technology is informed by the limitations of living at sea. This has motivated their use of solar energy, small batteries and donated, second-hand hardware. Hundred Rabbits has argued that the technologies with the greatest longevity are those that rely on common, portable, low-technology. They believe building on simple virtual machines serves these criteria because they are easy to port to new devices. Hundred Rabbits also believes using open-source software is preferable for living within limits due to the availability of documentation and for how it enables individuals to troubleshoot and solve problems on their own. Linvega has said they have an appreciation of both minimalism and open-source software.

=== Artificial intelligence ===
Linvega described AI as the end result of "human-centric" programming, where the computer acts in service of the desire of the human programmer, rather than the human programmer working to meet the needs of the computer. They identify this as a problem in the context of computer efficiency; the decrease in demand for skills in low-level programming will increase demand for computer resources to support the abstractions required to do high-level programming.
